= Expedition to Kolding =

Part of the Torstenson War

- Part of the Torstenson War
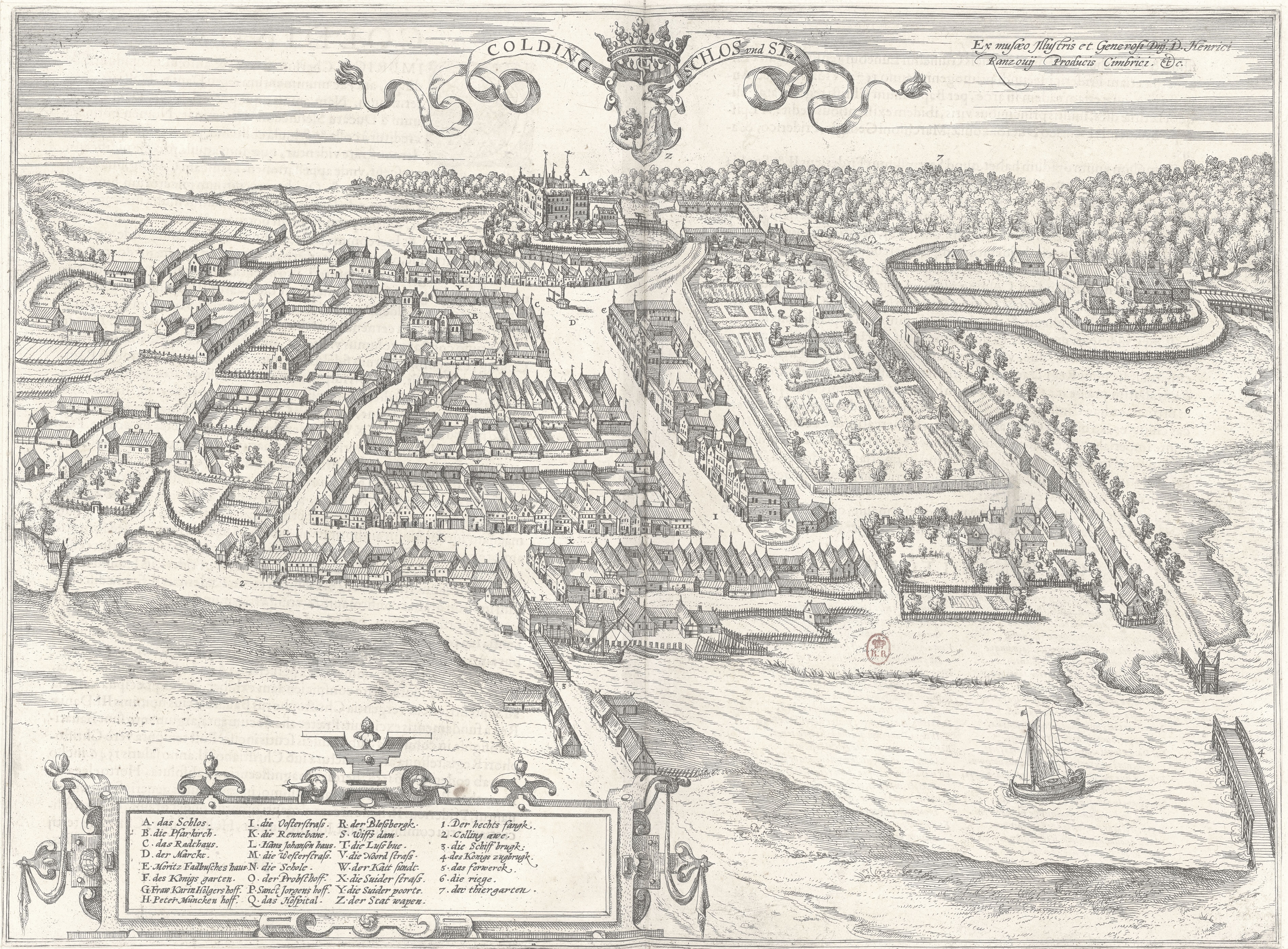
- Depiction of Kolding in 1640 by Peter von Brachel, published in Cologne
Date	1–2 May 1644
Location	Kolding, Denmark–Norway (present-day Denmark) 55°29′30″N 9°30′0″E
Result	Danish victory
Territorial changes	Kolding is captured by Danish forces

Belligerents
Denmark–Norway	(yes) Swedish Empire

Commanders and leaders
Anders Bille	(yes) Plettenberg †

Units involved
Unknown	(yes) Kolding garrison

Strength
c. 900 men A couple of warships	1,000 men

Casualties and losses
Insignificant	Troop casualties disputed (Note: See § Swedish casualties.); Many vessels destroyed One barge captured Several skutor captured

The expedition to Kolding occurred from 1 to 2 May 1644 during the Torstenson War between Denmark and Sweden.

In January 1644, a Swedish force took both the town of Kolding and its castle, Koldinghus. On 1 May, following an attack on Aabenraa in March, a Danish force of some 900 men and a couple of warships departed from Middelfart, reaching Kolding during the night. Guided by local peasants, the Danes advanced along Kolding Fjord and through the forests near the shore, surprising the Swedish garrison in Kolding. Advancing toward Koldinghus, the Danes also killed Colonel Plettenberg.

Following the main attack on Kolding, the Danes burned and captured several vessels in Kolding Fjord that were intended for use in a Swedish landing on Funen.

== Background ==
On 13 December 1643, after months of preparation by Axel Oxenstierna, a Swedish army of 16,000 men invaded Holstein under the command of Lennart Torstensson, sparking the eponymous Torstenson War between Denmark and Sweden.

On 9 January 1644, Swedish cavalry led by Robert Douglas defeated a cavalry force of 1,400 to 1,900 Danes led by Friedrich von Buchwald in the battle of Kolding. Buchwald was captured. Kolding and Koldinghus were also captured by the Swedes, the latter via a storming.

=== Prelude ===
In a night attack on 15 or 25 March, a Danish force of a few hundred men crossed the Little Belt between Funen and Jutland and attacked Aabenraa. The attack surprised the Swedish garrison inside, most of it being killed. The attack on Aabenraa served as a prelude to Bille's attack on Kolding in May.

== Expedition ==
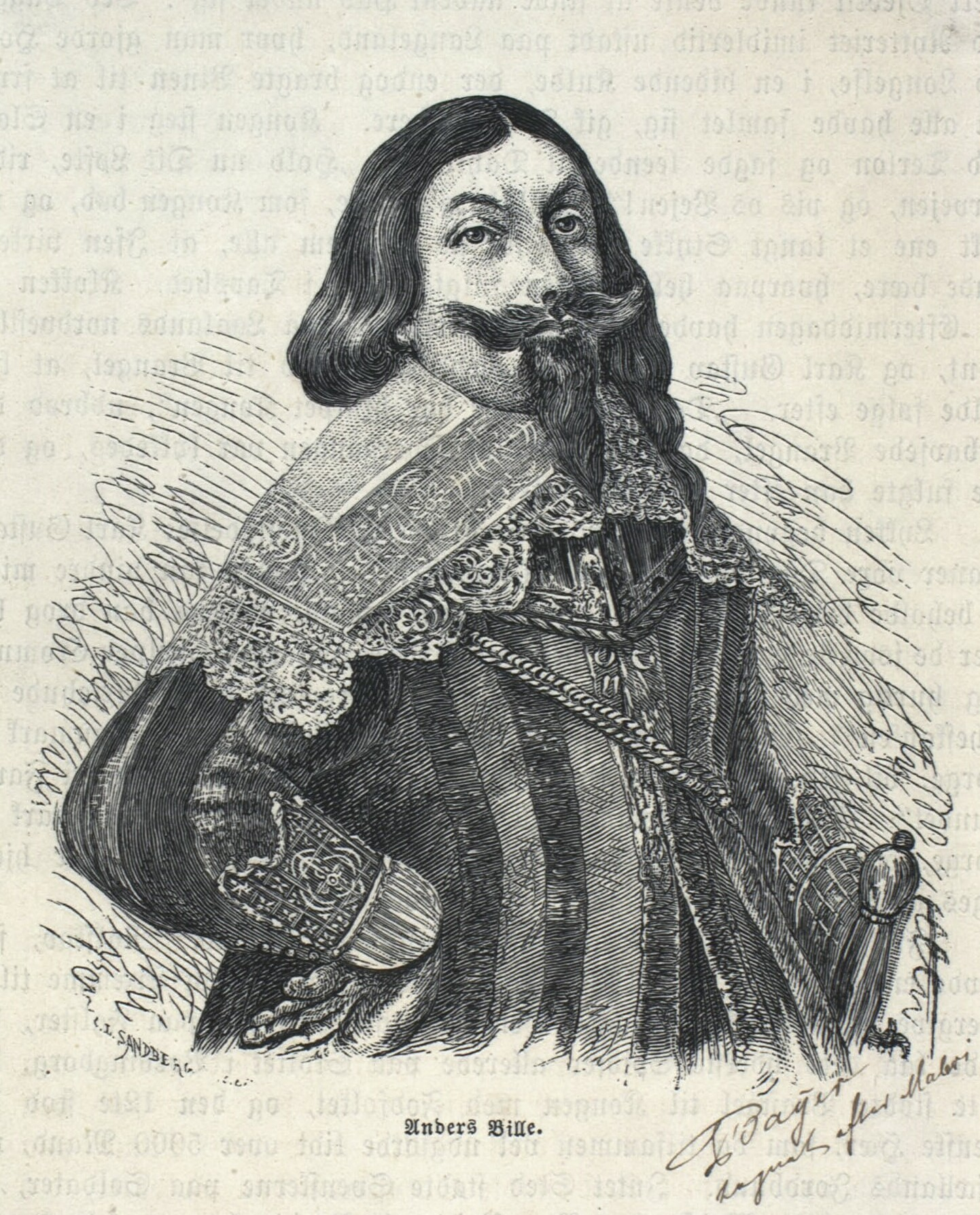
19th-century copperplate engraving of Bille by Carl Leonard Sandberg

On 1 May, Anders Bille embarked from Middelfart with some 900 infantry and cavalry. He arrived at Kolding during the night with an escort by a couple of warships. The Danes, guided by local peasants, advanced partly up Kolding Fjord and partly through the forests on the shore. The advance took the Swedish garrison of 1,000 men by surprise. In a letter from Torstensson, he claims that the Danes arrived on 2 May around 3 to 4 a.m., entered the town, and plundered it for three hours.

A large number of the soldiers in the garrison were killed, the number of which the French magazine La Gazette put at 21. Advancing toward Koldinghus, the Danes also killed Colonel Plettenberg. The Danes continued toward Kolding Fjord, where they burned a large number of boats alongside a larger vessel intended to be used for a Swedish amphibious landing on Funen. A large barge intended to transport horses, and some skutor (small transport vessels), were captured by the Danes. Danish casualties during the expedition were insignificant.

== Aftermath ==
Following the expedition, Bille returned to Funen. A few days later, he returned to Jutland and attacked Snoghøj, which was held by a Swedish garrison following a siege a few months prior. The Swedish garrison was killed, and the guns inside Snoghøj were brought back to Funen.

=== Swedish casualties ===
Accounts of Swedish casualties differ. According to the Danish chronicle Compendium Cosmographicum, Bille had defeated four Swedish regiments, taken several hundred prisoners, and burned all the boats and ships in Kolding's harbor. However, according to La Gazette, the Swedes lost one colonel, two lieutenant colonels, and one major. The casualties given by La Gazette were shared by Swedish historian Arnold Munthe.

Danish historian Axel Liljefalk gave a different account. According to him, the Swedes lost two captains, one major, one lieutenant colonel, nine other officers, and a large number of non-commissioned officers and regular troops. He also estimated that 200 Swedes, five regimental colors, thousands of muskets, several cannons, and large quantities of ammunition were captured. Danish historian Frederik Barfod estimates the same number of men captured.

== See also ==
- Helmut Wrangel's reconquest of Jutland – Swedish invasion of Jutland 1644–1645
