= Kolding =

- City
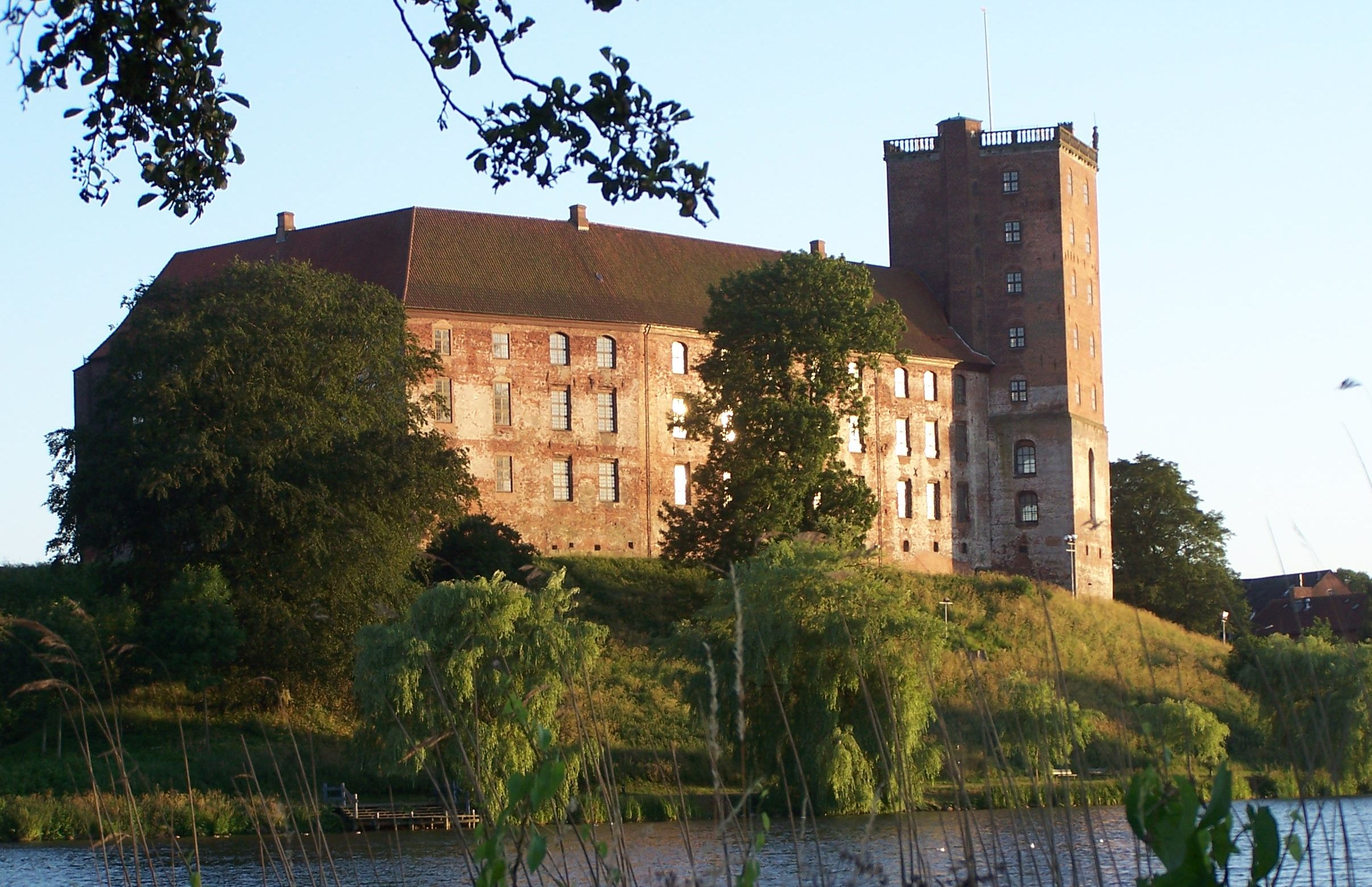
- Jutland's last royal castle (Koldinghus) located in the city centre of Kolding

- Coat of arms

- Kolding (left center) in Denmark Kolding (Region of Southern Denmark)
- Coordinates: 55°29′30″N 9°30′0″E
- Country: Denmark
- Region: Southern Denmark
- Municipality: Kolding
- First documented: 1231

Government
  - Mayor: Jakob Ville

Area
  - Urban: 38.6 km^{2} (14.9 sq mi)
- Elevation: 50 m (160 ft)

Population (2026)
  - Urban: 63,664
  - Urban density: 1,650/km^{2} (4,270/sq mi)
  - Gender: 31,475 males and 32,189 females
- Demonym(s): Koldingenser, Koldinger
- Time zone: UTC+1 (CET)
  - Summer (DST): UTC+2 (CEST)
- Postal code: 6000
- Area code: (+45) 7
- Website: kolding.dk

Kolding (Danish pronunciation: [ˈkʰʌle̝ŋ]) is a Danish seaport city located at the head of Kolding Fjord in southeast Jutland. It is the seat of Kolding Municipality. It is a transportation, commercial, and manufacturing centre and has numerous industrial companies, principally geared towards shipbuilding. The manufacturing of machinery and textiles and livestock export are other economically significant activities.

With a population of 96,214 (1 January 2026), the Kolding municipality is the eleventh most populous in Denmark. The city itself has a population of 63,664 (1 January 2026) and is the eighth largest city in Denmark.

The city is part of the Triangle Region, which includes the neighbouring cities of Fredericia and Vejle. The city was recognized as a "Design City" by UNESCO in 2017.

== History ==
Koldinghus would be besieged and presumably occupied by Holstein in 1369.

On 9 January 1644, a battle was fought at Kolding during the Torstenson War between Danish and Swedish forces.

On 1 May 1644, Kolding was captured in a naval expedition by Danish forces led by Anders Bille.

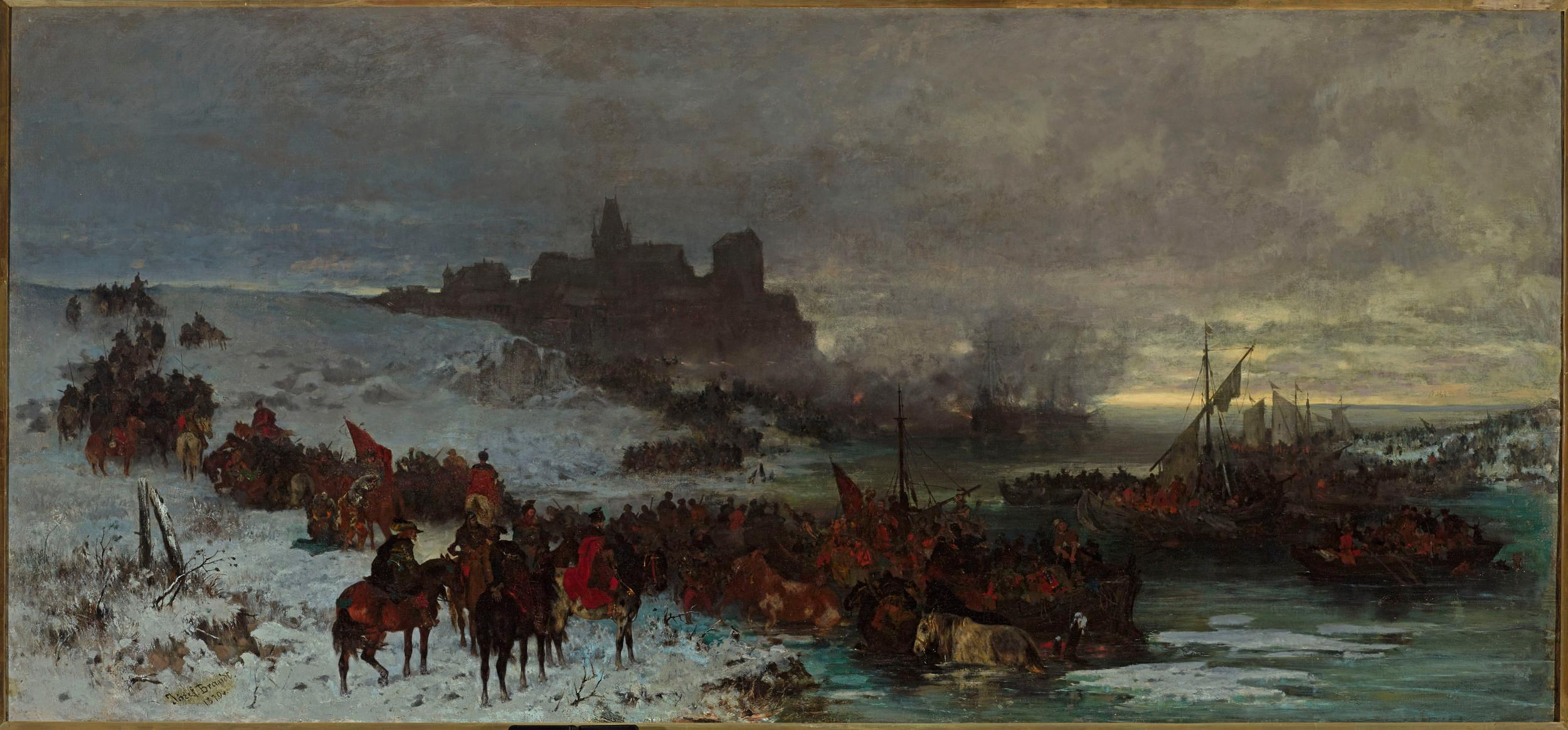
Battle of Kolding, 1658

In the Battle of Kolding, fought on 25 December 1658, the allied Polish and Danish forces under hetman Stefan Czarniecki defeated the Swedish forces of Charles X Gustav of Sweden.

A battle between German and Danish forces took place near the town on 23 April 1849 during the First War of Schleswig.

On 9 September 1955, Kolding was impacted by a high-end F2/T5 Tornado that displaced a car 20 meters into a yard.

On 3 November 2004, the N. P. Johnsen's Fireworks Factory in the suburb of Seest exploded. One firefighter died, 85 people were injured, around 2,000 people were evacuated, and some of them lost their homes during this disaster.

== Overview ==
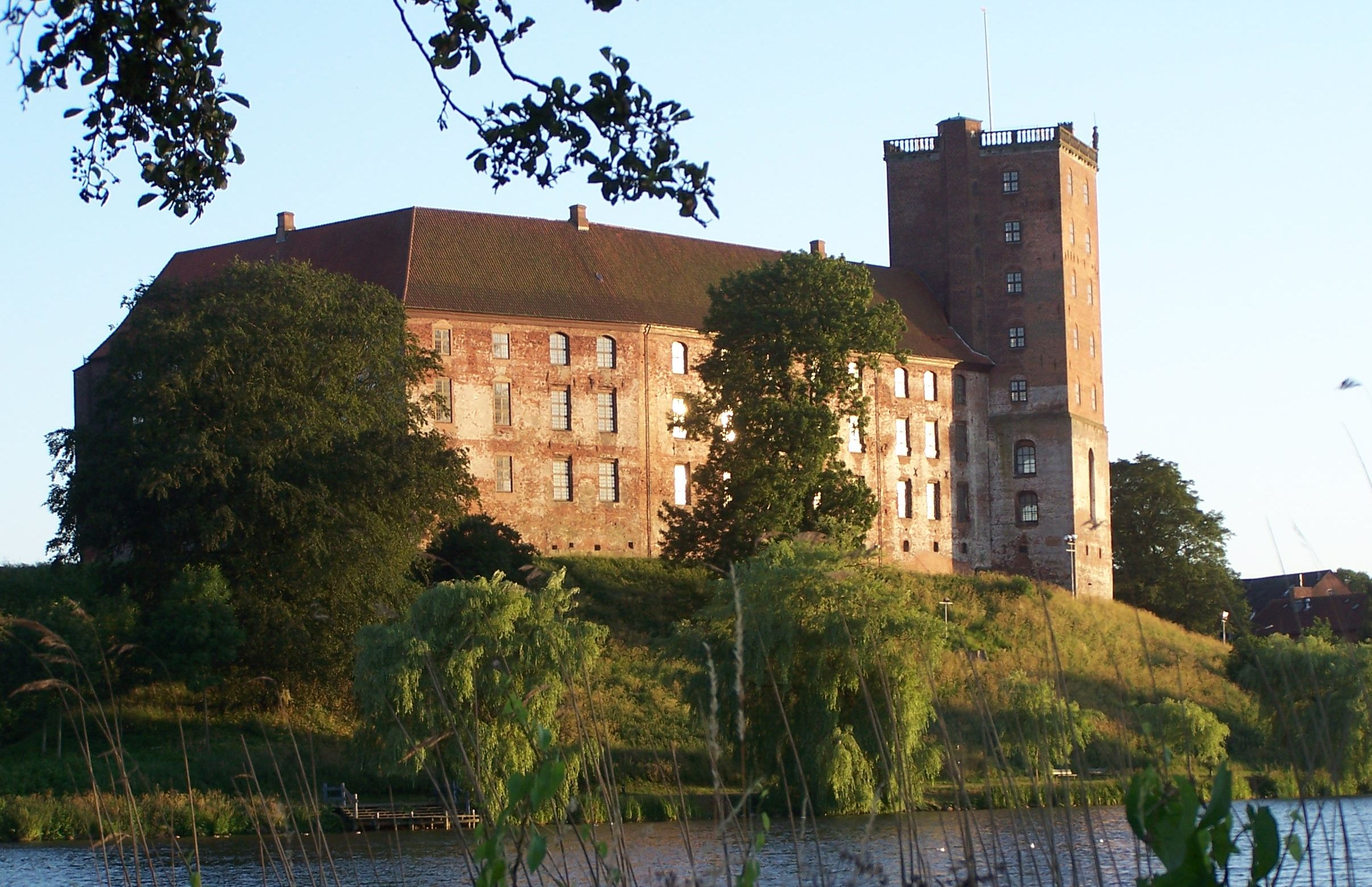
Kolding Castle

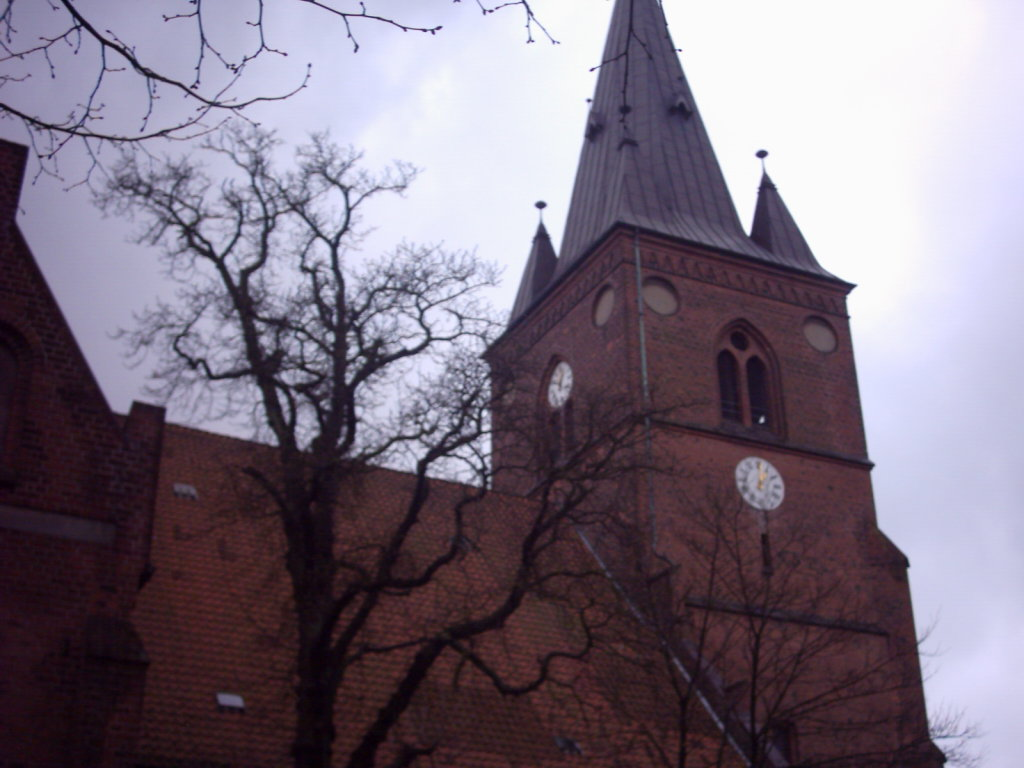
Evangelical Lutheran church in Kolding

Located in Kolding is the former royal castle of Koldinghus. This was built in the 13th century by King Eric Klipping and is a museum with certain parts of the castle, including its chapel and hall, being used for governmental ceremonial events. It was the last royal residence in Jutland. Another notable site is the 13th century stone Church of Saint Nicholas (Danish: Sankt Nicolai), which is one of the oldest in Denmark.

=== Main sights ===
The municipal museum, the Museet på Koldinghus, is located in the castle and former royal palace. It has a collection of Danish art from the late Middle Ages to the 1940s, miscellaneous artefacts of local interest, and an extensive collection of items in gold and silver.

The Trapholt art museum features many pieces primarily by Danish artists in its collections of arts from 1900 onwards and a smaller number of non-Danish exhibits. It also features a large collection of chairs.

Botanical garden Geografisk Have is a 14 hectares large park with more than 2,000 different trees, bushes, and plants organised in geographical areas.

Also Kolding houses the Danish Museum of Nurses (Danish: Dansk Sygeplejemuseum), which is situated in the reception building of the former tuberculosis sanatorium for children. The exhibition also include this past of the buildings. The main part of the sanatorium is now a hotel, situated in a minor forest and overlooking the water. The building itself is very beautiful and built to resemble a palace.

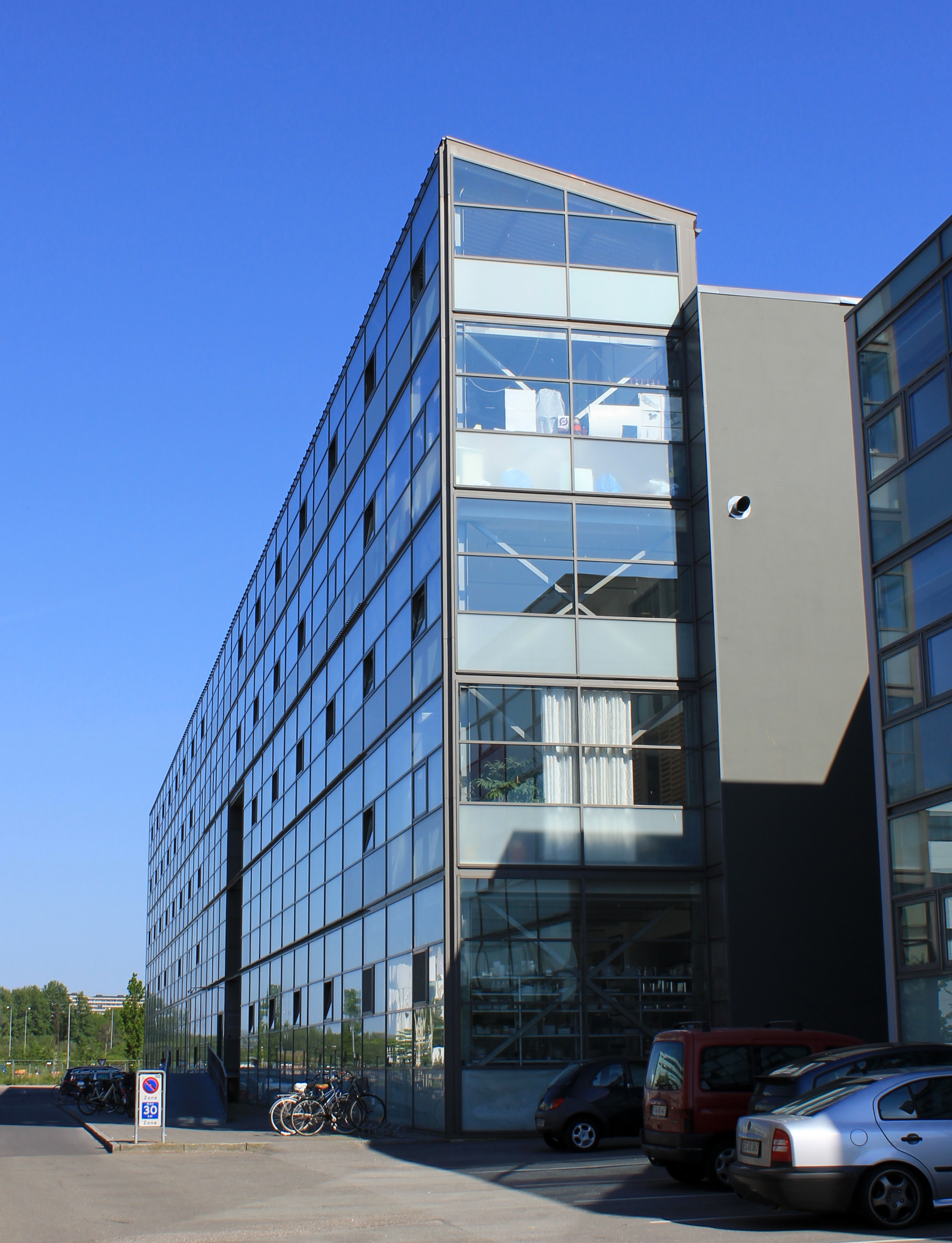
Design School Kolding

== Education ==
A branch of University College South (Danish: University College Syd) can be found in Kolding.

A branch campus of University of Southern Denmark (Danish: Syddansk Universitet) is located in the former hospital which was closed in 1975. The new Campus Kolding opened downtown in 2014. The new building of University of Southern Denmark will be built further to the east at Grønborggrunden in central Kolding.

Kolding is also home to Design School Kolding (Designskolen Kolding), a university design school, which was established in 1967 to provide undergraduate and postgraduate degrees in the areas of fashion, graphic design and textiles.

== Sister cities ==
Kolding is twinned with the following towns.

City	Region	Country	Year
Anjō	Aichi Prefecture	Japan	1997
Delmenhorst	Lower Saxony	Germany	1979
Drammen	Buskerud	Norway	1946
Huéscar	Granada	Spain	1982
Lappeenranta	South Karelia	Finland	1947
Nanortalik	Kujalleq	Greenland	2007
Örebro	Närke	Sweden	1946
Panevėžys	Panevėžys County	Lithuania	2000
Pisa	Tuscany	Italy	2007
Stykkishólmur	(Iceland) Western Region	Iceland	1979
Szombathely	Vas County	Hungary	1991

== Transportation ==
=== Rail ===
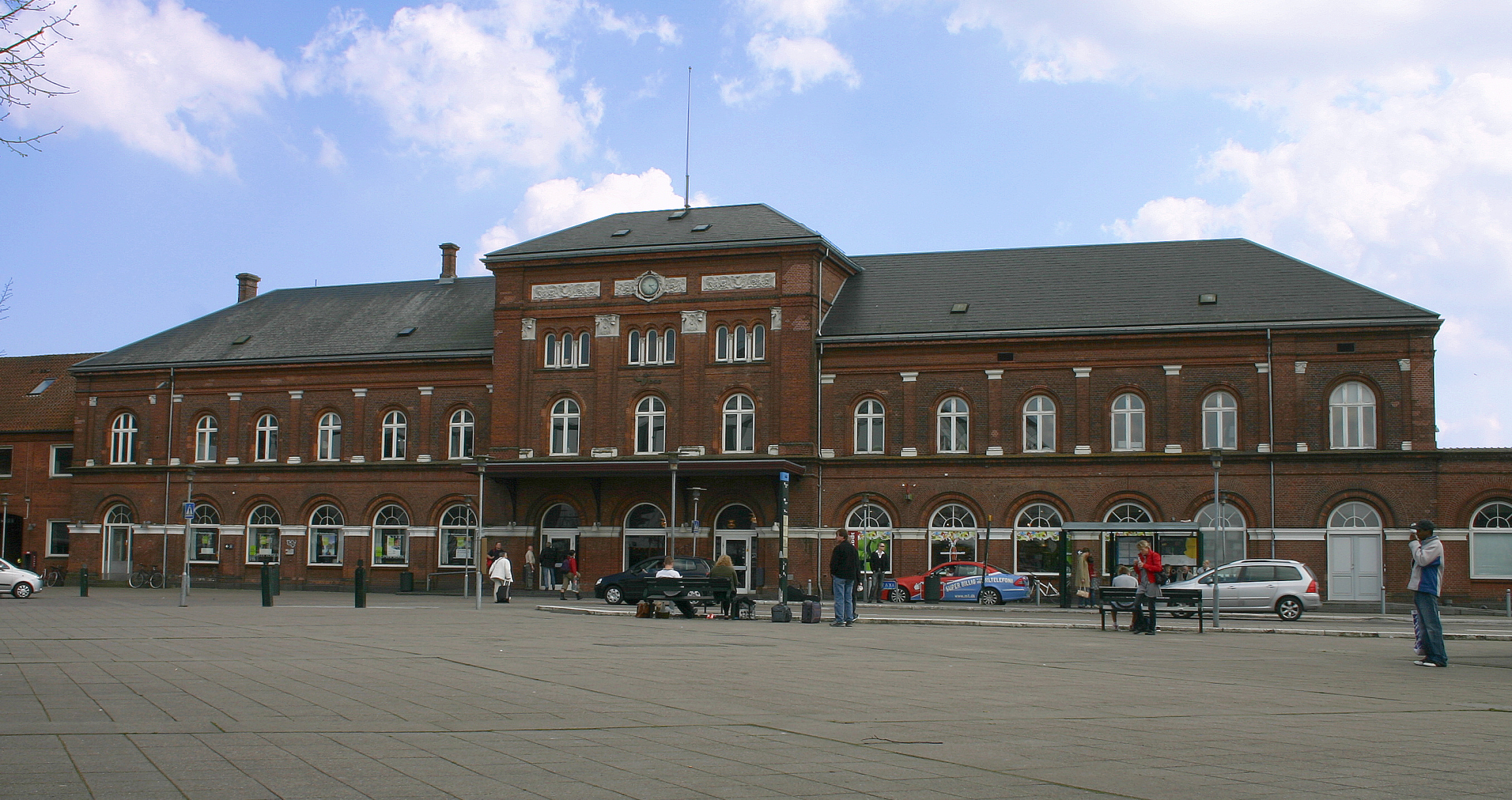
Front facade of Kolding railway station

Kolding is served by Kolding railway station. It is located on the Fredericia-Flensburg railway line and offers direct InterCity services to Copenhagen, Hamburg, Sønderborg, Aarhus and Esbjerg as well as regional train services to Fredericia and Esbjerg.

=== Air ===
The city doesn't have it own airport. Residents in the city would use Billund Airport which provides direct routes to other parts of Denmark and Europe. It located 46 km (29 mi) which is 40 minutes drive north west of Kolding.

== Notable people ==
=== Public service and public thinking ===
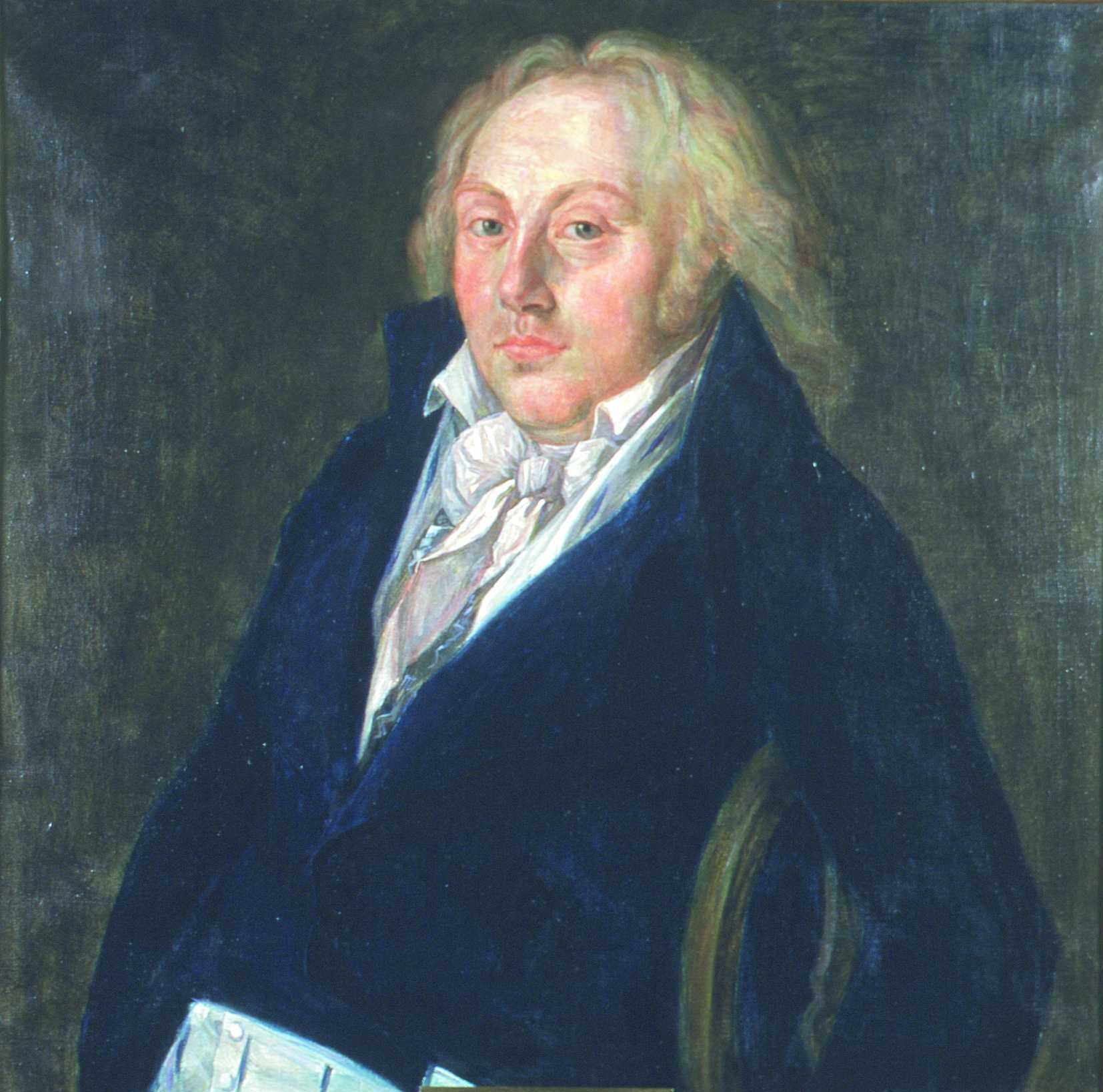
Mathias Sommerhielm, 1814

- Princess Dorothea of Denmark (1546 in Kolding – 1617), Duchess of Brunswick-Lüneburg 1561–1592
- Mathias Sommerhielm (1764 in Kolding – 1827) a Norwegian Prime Minister
- Evald Tang Kristensen (1843 in Nørre Bjert near Kolding – 1929) a folklore collector and author
- Christian Peder Kryssing (1891 in Kolding – 1976) a collaborator with Nazi Germany in WWII
- Svend Petersen (1911 in Kolding – 1992) political researcher in the US, analyst and author
- Bente Hansen (born 1940 in Kolding) a Danish women's rights activist, writer and editor
- Uffe Haagerup (1949 in Kolding – 2015), mathematician
- Jørn Dohrmann (born 1969 in Kolding) a Danish politician and MEP
- Bjarne Corydon (born 1973 in Kolding), former politician, management consultant and business newspaper editor
- Karina Adsbøl (born 1976 in Kolding), politician, MP since 2011
- Steffen Larsen (born 1983 in Kolding), politician, MP since 2022

=== Arts and entertainment ===
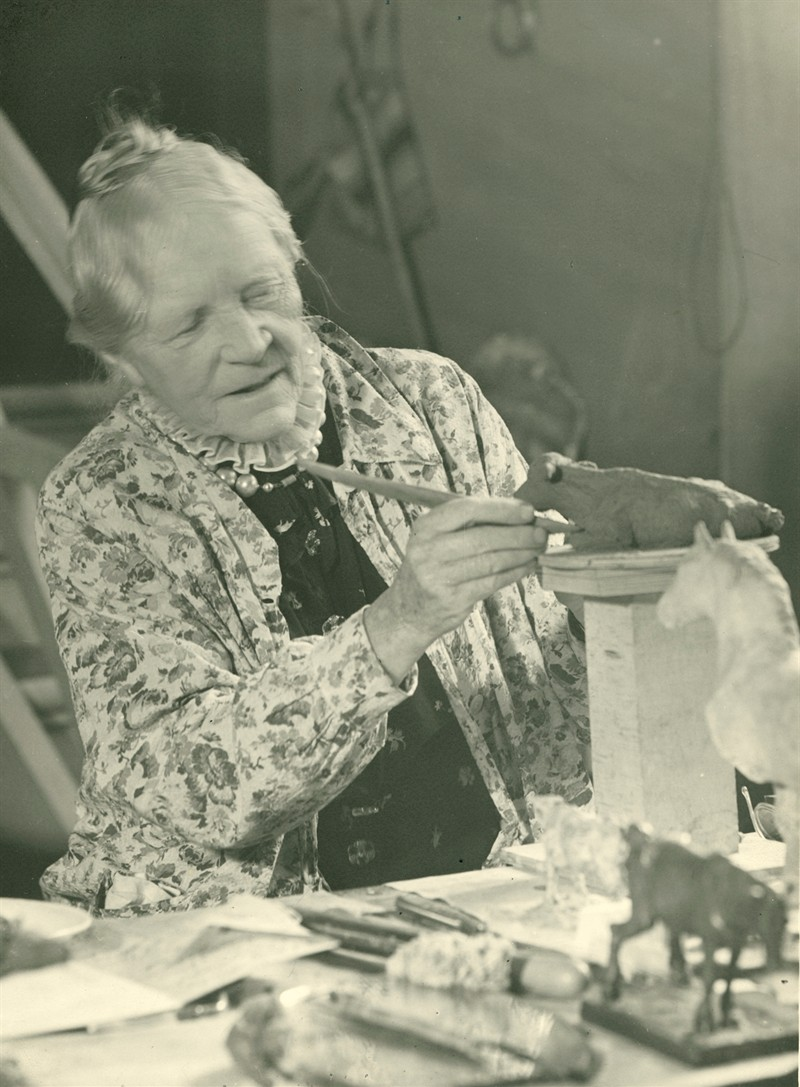
Anne Marie Carl-Nielsen

- Catharine Wernicke (1789 in Kolding – 1862) a Danish pianist, the first Danish woman to perform publicly as a pianist
- Anne Marie Carl-Nielsen (1863 in South Stenderup, near Kolding – 1945) a Danish sculptor
- Thorkild Roose (1874 in Kolding – 1961) a Danish actor and theatre director
- Christian Daugaard (1901 in Kolding – 1993) was a Danish painter
- Karl Gustav Hansen (1914–2002), silversmith
- Lars Bo (1924 in Kolding – 1999), artist and author
- Erik Paaske (1933 in Kolding – 1992), actor and singer
- Bent Faurby (born 1937 in Kolding) an author of children's literature and schoolteacher
- Ole Søltoft (1941 in Kolding – 1999) a Danish actor
- Karl Aage Rasmussen (born 1947 in Kolding) a composer and writer.
- Merete Van Kamp (born 1961 in Kolding) a model turned actress and singer
- Charlotte Eskildsen (born 1975 in Kolding) a Danish fashion designer.
- Susanne Georgi (born 1976 in Sjølund) a Danish singer, lives and works in Andorra

=== Sport ===
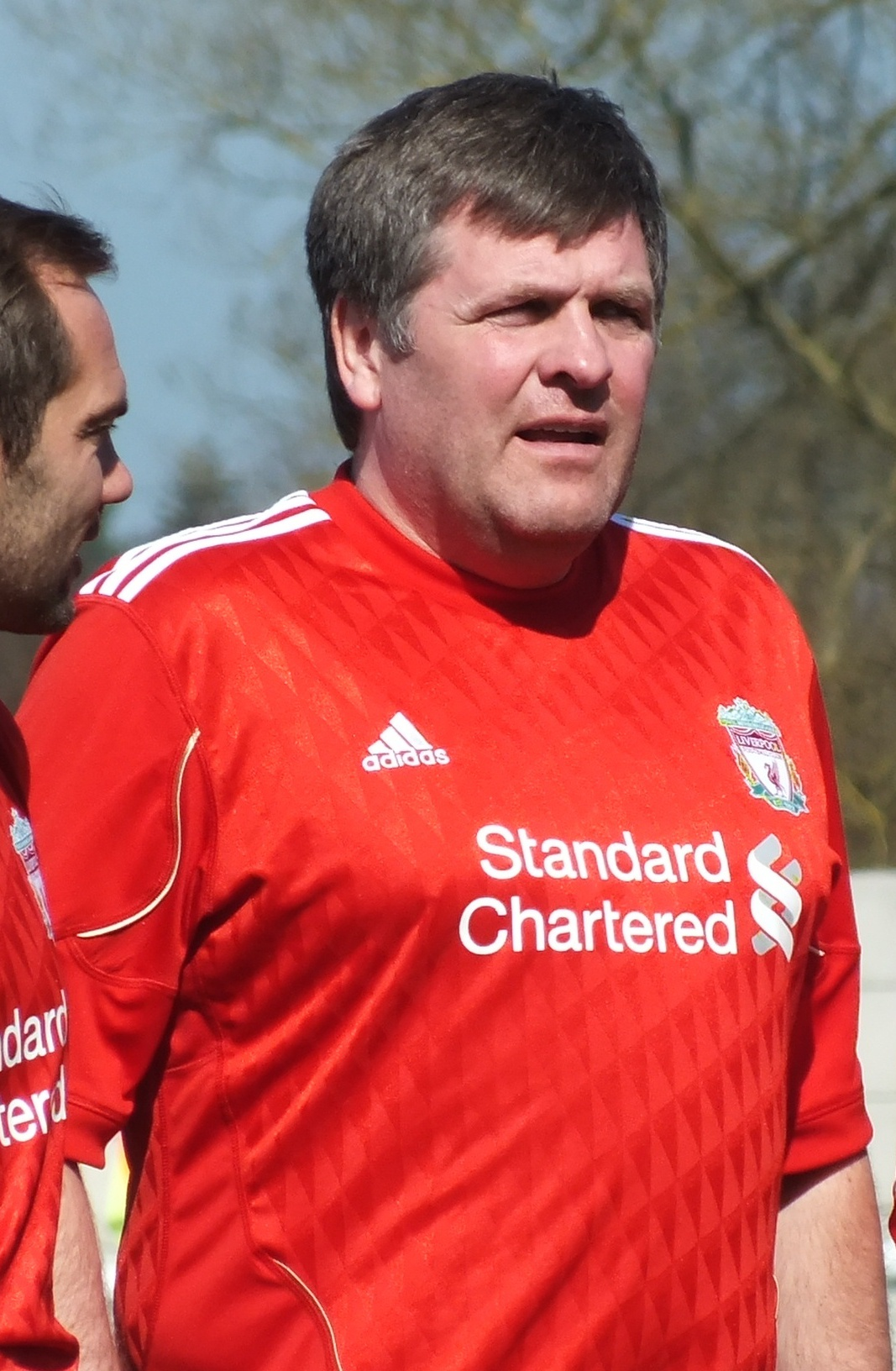
Jan Mølby, 2012

- Søren Petersen (1894 in Kolding – 1945), heavyweight boxer, silver medalist in both the 1920 and 1924 Summer Olympics
- Harald Christensen (1907 in Kolding – 1994) a cyclist, bronze medalist at the 1932 Summer Olympics
- Jan Mølby (born 1963 in Kolding), football player and coach; 364 club caps and 33 for Denmark
- Johnny Mølby (born 1969 in Kolding) a football manager and former player, over 350 club caps
- Tina Bøttzau (born 1971 in Kolding), handball player, twice team gold medalist at 1996 and 2000 Summer Olympics
- Martin Lundgaard Hansen (born 1972 in Kolding) a successful Danish badminton player
- Allan K. Jepsen (born 1977 in Kolding) former professional footballer, over 300 club caps
- Louise Spellerberg (born 1982 in Kolding), handball player
- Jonas Lössl (born 1989 in Kolding), soccer goalkeeper
- Kasper Asgreen (born 1995 in Kolding), professional cyclist
- Bastian Buus (born 2003 in Kolding), racing driver

== See also ==
- Kolding Municipality
- Chronicle of the Expulsion of the Grayfriars#Chapter 6 Concerning the Friary in Kolding

== Works cited ==
- Englund, Peter (1993). Ofredsår: om den Svenska Stormaktstiden och en man i dess mitt [Years of unrest: about the Swedish Empire and a man in its midst] (in Swedish). Stockholm: Atlantis. ISBN 9789174863499.
- Munthe, Arnold [in Swedish] (1908). Klas Fleming, Karl Gustaf Wrangel, Martin Thijsen Anckarhielm, Danska kriget 1643–1645: Omfattande tiden till Juli 1644 [Klas Fleming, Carl Gustaf Wrangel, Martin Thijsen Anckarhielm, the Danish war 1643–1645: Covering the period until July 1644] (PDF). Svenska sjöhjältar (in Swedish). Vol. 5:1. Stockholm: P. A. Norstedt & Söners förlag.
