= Torstensson's Jutland campaign =

Swedish invasion of Jutland 1643–1644

- Part of the Torstenson War
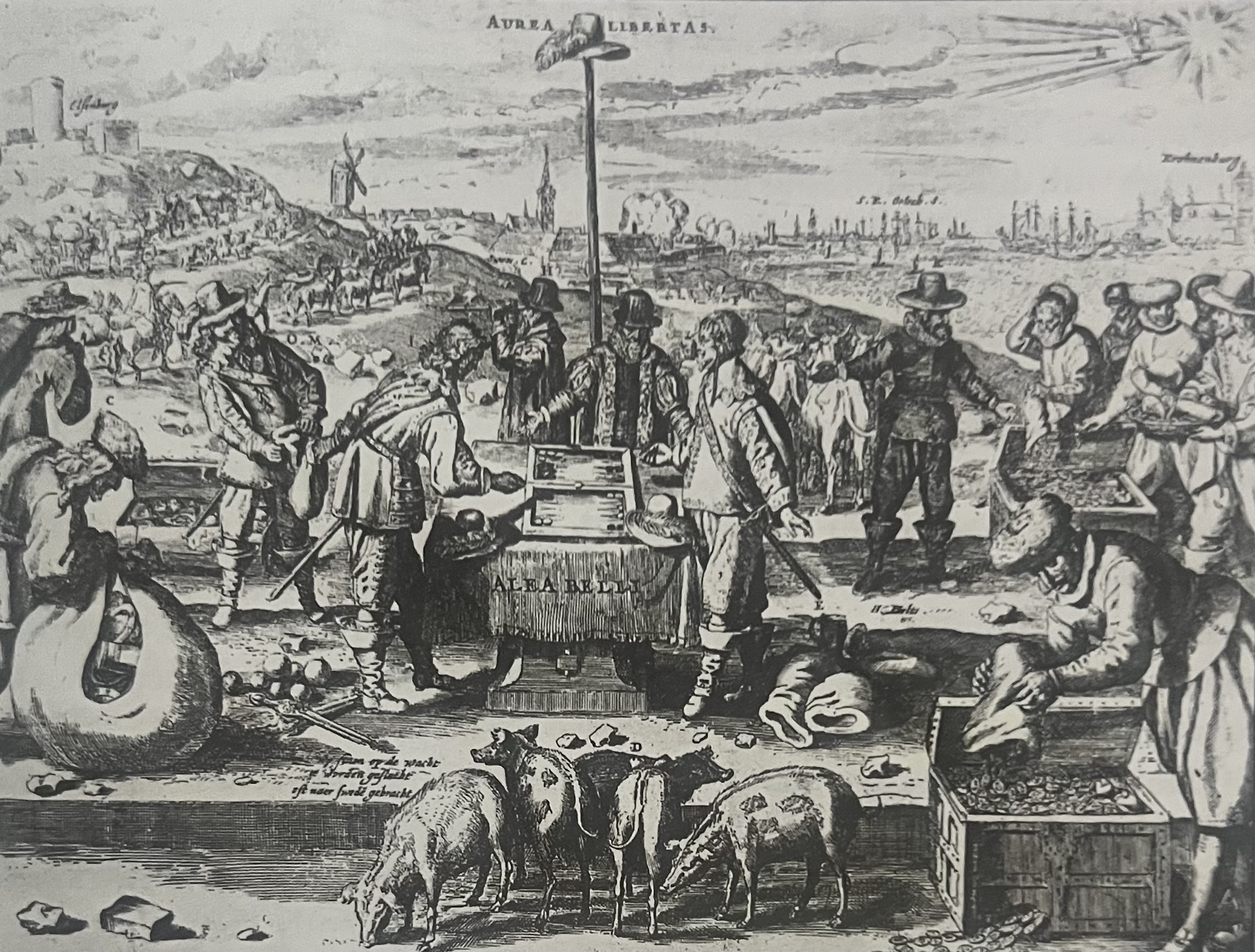
- 1644 print; Lennart Torstensson (left), Christian IV (right)
Date	13 December 1643 – 20 January 1644
Location	Jutland & Holstein, Denmark–Norway (present-day Denmark)
Result	Swedish victory
Territorial changes	Most of Holstein and all of Jutland is occupied by Swedish forces

Belligerents
(yes) Swedish Empire	Denmark–Norway

Commanders and leaders
(yes) Lennart Torstensson (yes) Robert Douglas (yes) Carl Gustaf Wrangel (yes) Mortaigne de Potelles (yes) Arvid Wittenberg (yes) Torsten Stålhandske	Anders Bille; Axel Urup (POW); Friedrich von Buchwald (POW)

Strength
16,000 men	6,100 men

Torstensson's Jutland campaign (Note: Swedish: Torstenssons fälttåg på Jutska halvön) began in December 1643 when Lennart Torstensson and 16,000 men invaded Holstein and Jutland. In January 1644, his subordinate Torsten Stålhandske defeated a Danish cavalry force under Friedrich von Buchwald, capturing Kolding and later Snoghøj.

== Background ==
In May 1643, Axel Oxenstierna, Sweden's Chancellor, had had enough of Danish disruption of Swedish activities, such as blockading Hamburg. It was also in response to reports of a Danish mobilization of the navy and army, and Danish emissaries had been agitating peasants on the border. Additionally, there were also reports of Danish negotiations with the Holy Roman Empire and planning an anti-Swedish coalition between it, the Polish–Lithuanian Commonwealth, and the Tsardom of Russia. Another issue were the Sound Dues, where Christian IV had been taxing Swedish export ships, despite the Swedish exemption as said by the old Treaty of Knäred.

=== Swedish plan ===
In his plan, Oxenstierna wanted to neutralize the Danish threat to Sweden, and he outlined it according to the campaign strategy Gustavus Adolphus made in Stettin in 1630.

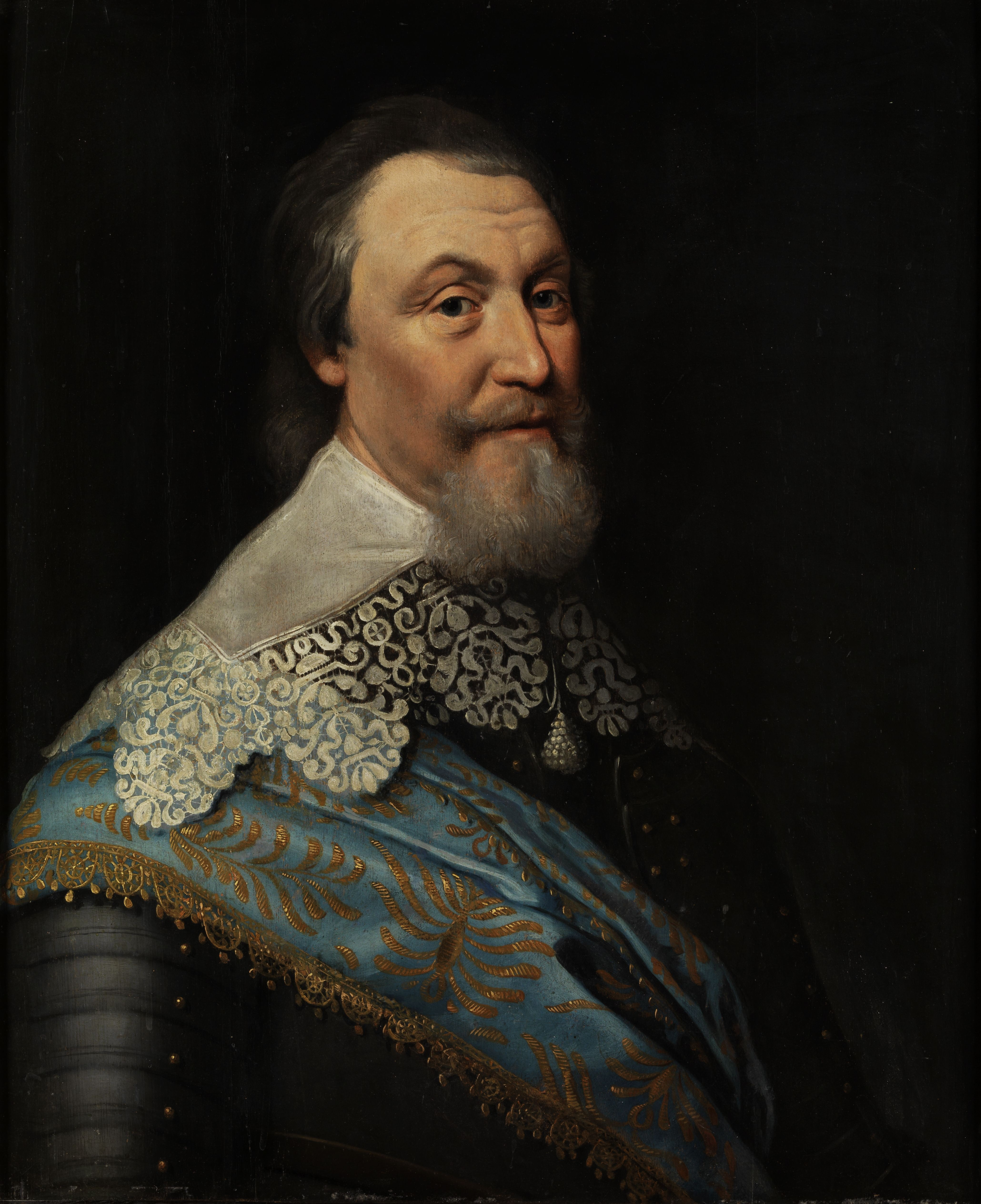
Portrait of Axel Oxenstierna by an unknown author after Michiel Janszoon

The plan has been noted by historian Michael Fredholm von Essen as being "well ahead of its time". In short, Torstensson would lead an attack through Germany, conquering Jutland and subsequently transporting his army over to the Danish islands, attacking Copenhagen once he had crossed all of them. At the same time, a corps of 2,200 men (2,000 infantry and 200 cavalry) under the command of Colonel Erik Hansson Ulfsparre would attack southern Zealand. Along with this, Field Marshal Gustav Horn would invade Scania, after which he would ship his troops over to Copenhagen and unite with Torstensson, forcing Christian IV to surrender. Envoys were also sent to the Netherlands to negotiate with Louis de Geer to send a fleet to Denmark to use as transport over to the Danish islands.

The Swedish plan was intended as a surprise attack, with one historian referring to it as a "true Blitzkrieg plan". However, the contemporary communication lines were not be quick enough for such planned coordination.

=== Prelude ===
After receiving the order to attack Denmark in early October, Torstensson quickly prepared defences on the Bohemian and Moravian borders, and marched towards the north-west, refraining from informing his officers of their destination. The army Torstensson brought consisted of around 12,000 national troops, and adding the officers and underofficers, it had a total strength of around 16,000 experienced men. Along with the army, Torstensson brought with him three generals, Carl Gustaf Wrangel, Mortaigne de Potelles, and Arvid Wittenberg, each commanding their own column in the Swedish march. Torstensson's officers were only notified of his intention once arrived at Havelberg on 6 December, allowing him to take the Danes by surprise.

Swedish intelligence suggested that the garrison in Glückstadt had a strength of 500 men, while there were only 5,000 men in all of Holstein, Jutland, and the Danish islands combined. However, in reality, there was some 6,100 men in Jutland alone.

== Invasion ==
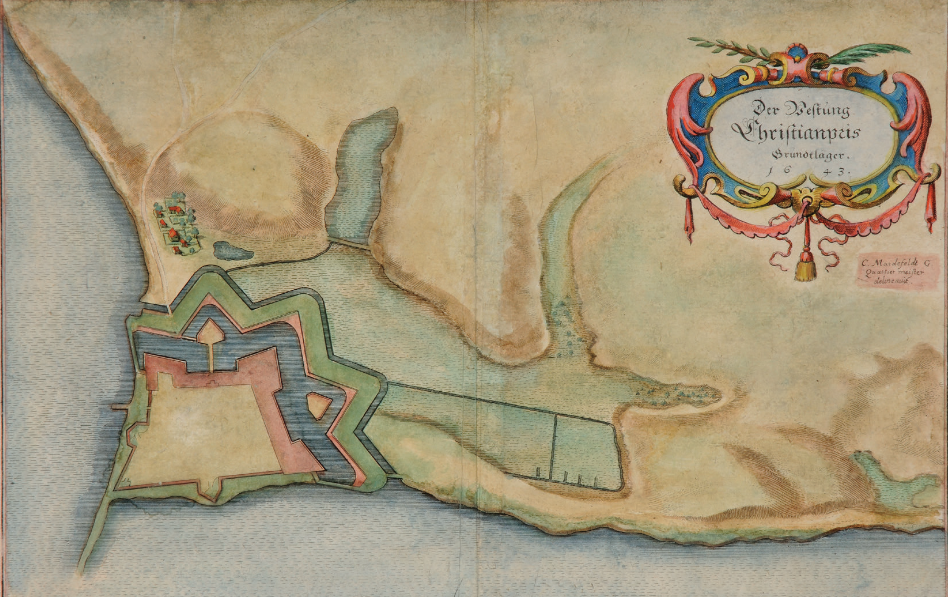
Contemporary map of Christianspris by Conrad Mardefelt

The Swedish army assembled at Ratzeburg on 11 December, invading Holstein two days later. Segelburg was captured on 14 December, Itzehoe, Kiel, and Breitenburg following suit soon after. Christianspris was successfully stormed on 18 December 1644, Axel Urup being taken captive. Following the fall of Christianspris, the Swedes captured a large amount of valuables and occupied Holstein. Several fortresses also surrendered without a fight due to Torstensson not taking any prisoners. Only Krempe and Glückstadt refused to surrender. From these fortresses, several raiding groups were consistently sent out to harass the Swedes. Additionally, nobles abandoned their castles, and burghers their cities, choosing to escape into the fortifications or to Copenhagen.

The invasion came as a shock to Christian IV; however, the Swedes claimed they were only seeking winter quarters. Torstensson seemingly intended to collect ships in Kiel to use in a landing on Fyn. However, with the approaching cold, he abandoned the plan.

After war was confirmed, Christian quickly initiated recruitments. This increased the Danish forces from only around 13,600 men to more than 26,000, placing these under the command of Anders Bille. Bille was ordered by Christian to assemble these troops in Snoghøj in order to stop the Swedish invasion as much as possible. In the battle of Kolding on 9 January, Torstensson encountered a 1,400-strong Danish free cavalry corps under Friedrich von Buchwald, with these being quickly dispersed by Robert Douglas. During the fighting, Buchwald himself was captured.

The remaining Danes fled into the nearby Snoghøj. After capturing Kolding, Torstensson moved against Snoghøj. The commander in the city, Anders Bille evacuated everyone he could over to Fyn before the city capitulated. The remaining troops, some 4,500 men, were all captured. Those who were not peasant troops joined Swedish service.

Afterwards, the rest of the Danish Jutland army surrendered. By 20 January, most of Holstein and all of Jutland were in Swedish hands. Some peasants tried to resist the Swedish advance, but were dispersed or killed.

== Aftermath ==
After the successful invasion, Torstensson made attempts to cross over to Fyn, but these failed. The war eventually ended a year later with the Second Treaty of Brömsebro in 1645, where the stipulations included the cession of Jämtland, Härjedalen, Gotland, Ösel, and Halland to Sweden, and Denmark and thus been replaced by Sweden as the dominant power in the Baltic Sea.

== Sources ==
- Essen, Michael Fredholm von (2020). The Lion from the North: The Swedish Army during the Thirty Years War 1632-48. Vol. 2. Helion & Company. ISBN 9781913118839.
- Englund, Peter (1993). Ofredsår: om den Svenska Stormaktstiden och en man i dess mitt [Years of unrest: about the Swedish Empire and a man in its midst] (in Swedish). Stockholm: Atlantis. ISBN 9789174863499.
- Sundberg, Ulf (2010). Sveriges krig 1630-1814 [Sweden's wars 1630–1814] (in Swedish). Svenskt militärhistoriskt bibliotek. ISBN 9789185789634.
- Palmstierna, Carl-Fredrik; Zeeh, Erik (1944). Slaget vid Femern [Battle of Fehrmarn] (PDF) (in Swedish). Gothenburg: Sjöhistoriska samfundet.
- Walde, O. (1916). Storhetstidens litterära krigsbyten [The Literary War Booty of the Age of Greatness] (PDF) (in Swedish). Almqvist & Wiksells.
- Wolke, Lars Ericson (2018). "Lennart Torstensson: Fader till det svenska artilleriet". Sveriges tio främsta fältherrar [Sweden's ten greatest generals] (in Swedish). Svenskt militärhistoriskt bibliotek. ISBN 9789188053787.
- Gullberg, Tom (2008). Lejonet vaknar 1611-1660 [The Lion Awakes 1611–1660]. Krigen kring Östersjön (in Swedish). Helsinki: Schildts. ISBN 9789515018229.
- Bain, Robert Nisbet (1905). Scandinavia: A Political History of Denmark, Norway, and Sweden from 1513 to 1900. Cambridge University Press.
