= Helmut Wrangel's reconquest of Jutland =

Swedish invasion of Jutland 1644–1645

- Part of the Torstenson War
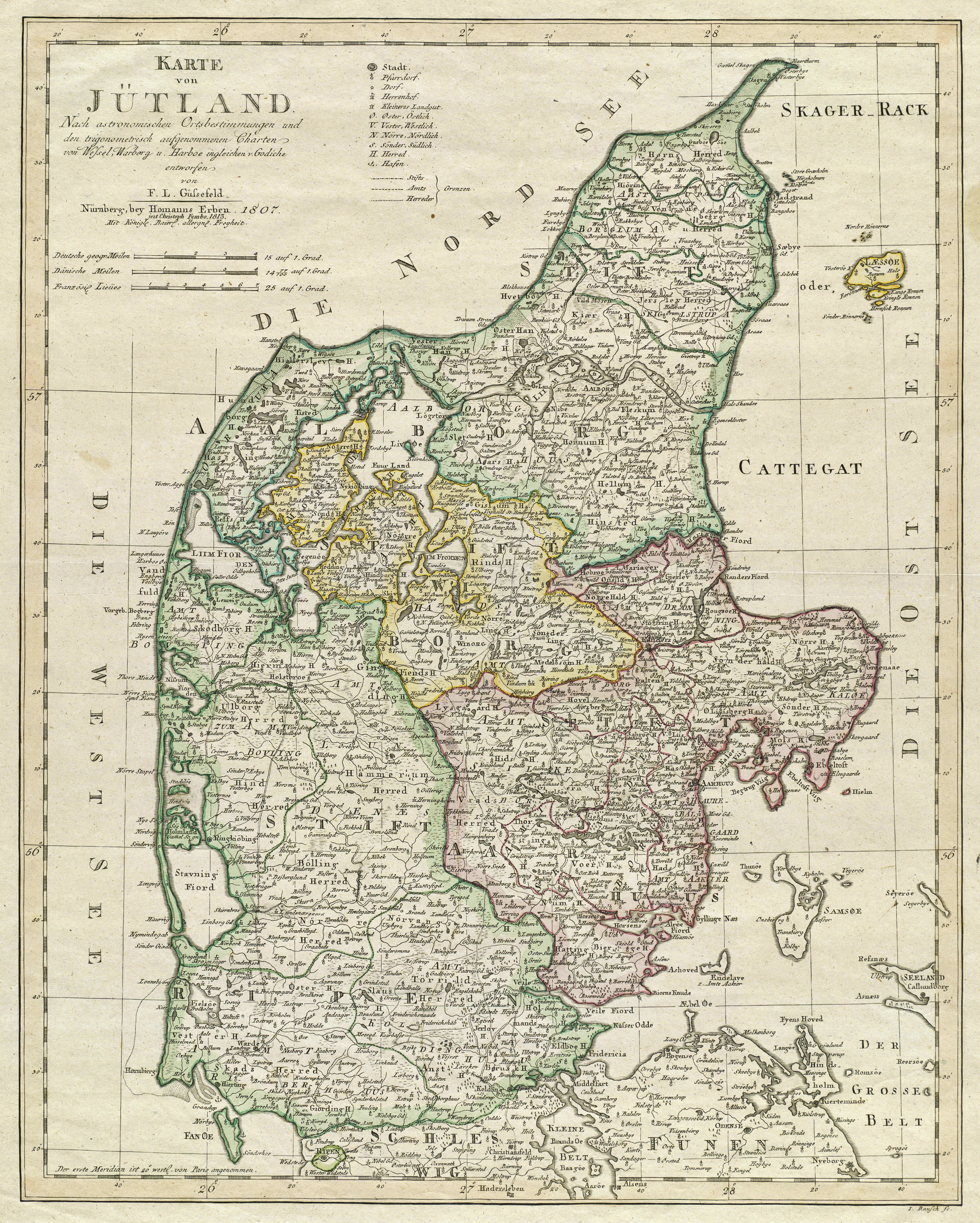
- Map of Jutland from 1871 by Wessel Warberg
Date	September 1644 – January 1645
Location	Jutland, Denmark
Result	Swedish victory
Territorial changes	Sweden regains control over Jutland

Belligerents
(yes) Swedish Empire	Denmark–Norway

Commanders and leaders
(yes) Helmut Wrangel	Prince Frederick; Friedrich von Buchwald; Claus von Ahlefeldt

Units involved
Unknown	Unknown

Strength
4,000–5,600 men	5,000 men

Casualties and losses
Unknown	11 cavalry companies annihilated

Helmut Wrangel's reconquest of Jutland occurred from September 1644 to January 1645 during the Torstenson War, when Lennart Torstensson sent a detachment of 4,000, 5,000, or 5,600 men under Helmut Wrangel to retake control of Jutland and Holstein which had been for the most part retaken by Denmark after the previous Swedish invasion.

== Background ==
After the Swedish army withdrew from Holstein after Lennart Torstensson invaded Jutland, a medal was struck with the inscription "What Gallas has accomplished in Holstein can briefly be read on the other side." with the other side being blank. This notion was the prevailing one at the time, but Gallas would likely have been defeated even more thoroughly by the Swedes than he was in the later battle of Jankau.

However, despite this, Gallas ensured that the Swedes evacuated almost the entirety of Jutland and Holstein, which was a significant relief for the Danes. The Swedish leadership believed that Torstensson's campaign in Jutland had not gone according to plan, and given the situation, had to "oppose the Emperor" and continue the war in Germany.

After Torstensson's withdrawal, the Jutlanders requested assistance from the government to help them organize "landets defension" among "Crown and demesne peasants, trade towns, and common men." Christian IV responded to this request with words of encouragement and suggested that they recruit volunteers and organize defences on their own. Initially, he did not promise immediate assistance, but three weeks later, he ordered muskets and cannons to be distributed for an "expedition" into Jutland. By late August, most of Jutland was back in Danish control.

== Reconquest ==
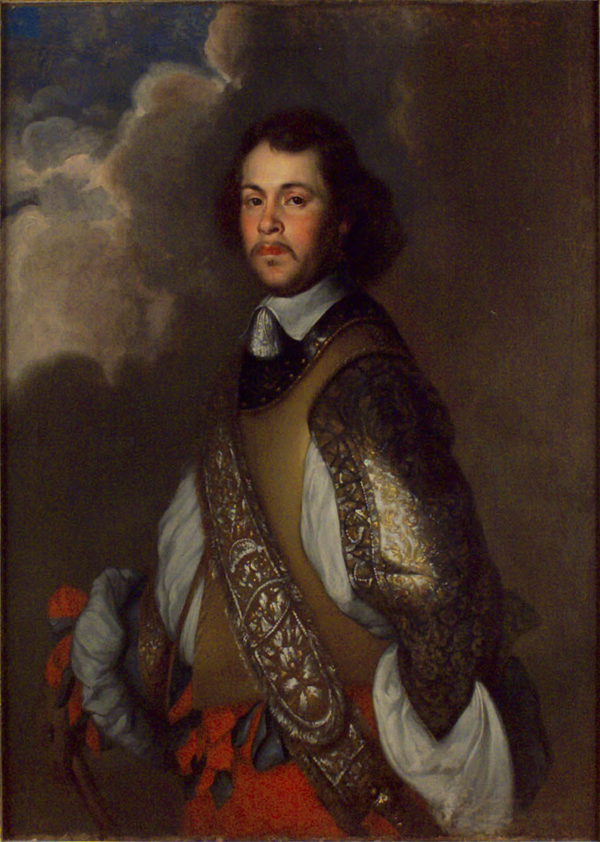
Portrait of Wrangel by Matthäus Merian the Elder

However, the "great source of strength that the Jutland Peninsula represented for Denmark" would not be left "undisturbed". In early September of 1644, before Torstensson went back to Germany, he sent a force estimated at 4,000, 5,000, or 5,600, altogether 16 regiments, under the command of Colonel Helmut Wrangel to Jutland and Holstein. His objective was to deprive the Danes the ability to utilize the resources in Jutland and Holstein as much as possible.

The Danish forces in Jutland were primarily under the command of Archbishop of Bremen, Prince Fredrik, who had a force totaling 5,000 men, composing of 3,000 infantry and 2,000 cavalry that were stationed in Holstein. Bitter disputes prevented decisive action between Fredrik and Anders Bille on Fyn, who were supposed to co-ordinate.

As he invaded, Wrangel swiftly retook Itzehoe, Flensburg, Haderslev, Kolding, Kiel, and Ribe, along with creating a fortified camp at Randers, from which his troops roamed the countryside. At Ribe, he also defeated General Buchwald. He also relieved Pinnenberg which was being besieged by the Danes on 4 September. He tried to do the same at Breitenberg, which failed. At Elmsporen, he annihilated 11 companies of cavalry under the command of General Ahlefeld, and stormed Krog and Stenborg. At Steinburger sconce, a battle took place in which the Swedish defenders sallied out and attacked the "Moorbauren" who then asked Count Penz for military support. Another battle took place outside of Itzehoe, where around 800 men, of which 400 were dragoons, and the rest of the Snapphane, fought with Wrangel's troops, but were eventually repelled. In January 1645, he momentarily left for Hamburg, bringing with him reinforcements and supplies before returning to ravage Danish territories.

== Aftermath ==
After these successes, Frederick began withdrawing to Kolding, subsequently being ordered to return to Glückstadt by Christian IV, leaving Wrangel supreme in Jutland.

== See also ==
- Torstensson's Jutland campaign – Swedish invasion of Jutland 1643–1644

== Works cited ==
- Palmstierna, Carl-Fredrik; Zeeh, Erik (1944). Slaget vid Femern [Battle of Fehrmarn] (PDF) (in Swedish). Gothenburg: Sjöhistoriska samfundet.
- Anderson, Roger Charles (1969). Naval Wars in the Baltic. London: Francis Edwards Limited. ISBN 9785879554090.
- Stenbock, R. (1928). Östgötta kavalleriregemente, 1618-1699 [Östgötta Cavalry Regiment, 1618-1699] (in Swedish). Haeggströms boktryckeri.
- Bäckström, Olli (2018). Snapphanar and Power States: Insurgency and the Transformation of War in Sweden and Denmark 1643–1645 (PhD thesis). Joensuu: University of Eastern Finland. ISBN 9789526129020.
