= Siege of Snoghøj =

Part of the Torstenson War

- Part of the Torstenson War
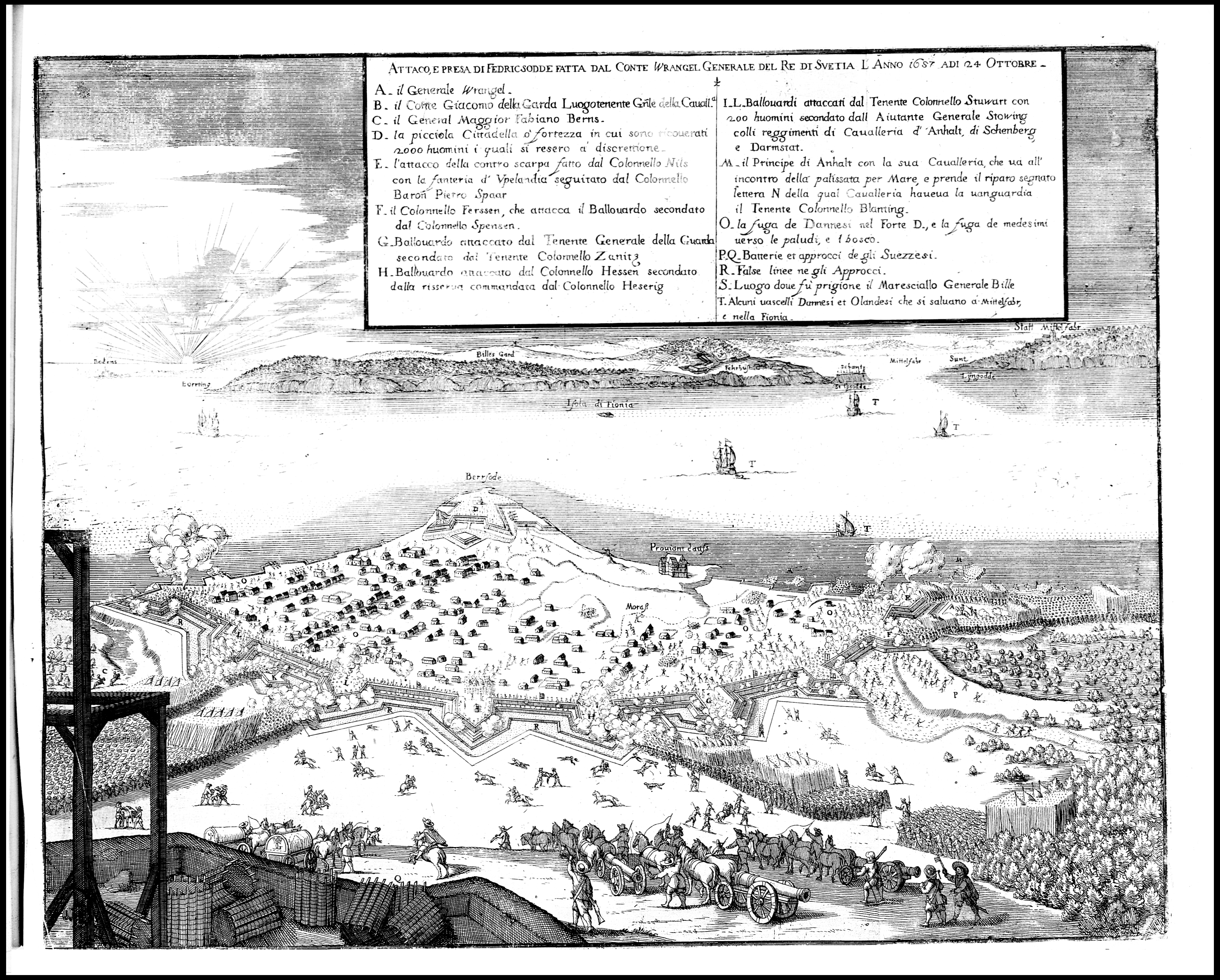
- 1670 depiction of Frederiksodde near Snoghøj by Galeazzo Gualdo Priorato
Date	11–14 January 1644
Location	Snoghøj, Denmark–Norway (present-day Denmark) 55°31′25″N 9°43′05″E
Result	Swedish victory
Territorial changes	Snoghøj is captured by Swedish forces

Belligerents
(yes) Swedish Empire	Denmark–Norway

Commanders and leaders
(yes) Lennart Torstensson	Anders Bille

Units involved
Unknown	Snoghøj garrison

Strength
Unknown	4,500 men

Casualties and losses
Unknown	4,500 captured

The siege of Snoghøj occurred from 11 to 14 January 1644 during the Torstenson War between Denmark–Norway and Sweden.

After Sweden went to war with Denmark in 1643, a Swedish army led by Lennart Torstensson invaded Jutland. The Swedes quickly captured multiple towns, and after an assault on Christianspris, the Swedish army moved toward the Danish fortification of Snoghøj, which was near its intended crossing point to Funen.

After three days of Danish resistance, the Swedish army formed up outside Snoghøj, and the Danish garrison, some 4,500 men in total, capitulated to the Swedes. The fortifications commander, Anders Bille, had evacuated to Funen before it fell.

== Background ==
Frustrated by perceived Danish disruptions of Swedish activities in the Thirty Years' War, Axel Oxenstierna, the chancellor of Sweden, began planning a preemptive war with Denmark in May 1643. According to his plan, a Swedish army under the command of Lennart Torstensson was to invade Jutland from Germany and then be transported to the Danish islands. Another army under the command of Gustav Horn would invade Scania.

=== Prelude ===
After being ordered to attack Denmark in October 1643, Torstensson prepared defenses on the borders of Bohemia and Moravia before marching northwest. He led about 15,000 or 16,000 men in total, 12,000 of whom were national troops. Only after arriving at Havelberg on 6 December were Torstensson's officers informed of the attack on Denmark.

The Swedish army assembled at Ratzeburg on 11 December and invaded Holstein on 13 December. They captured Segelburg, Itzehoe, Kiel, and Breitenburg, and then moved toward Christianspris. Christianspris would be captured on 19 December, after which Swedish forces defeated a Danish force at Kolding. Following the victory at Kolding, Swedish forces moved against Snoghøj.

== Siege ==
After reaching Snoghøj, which was near the location where the Swedes intended to cross to Funen, Torstensson ordered a bombardment of the unfinished fortification. The size of the garrison at Snoghøj is disputed. According to La Gazette, it numbered 15,000 men, while other sources estimate 9,000 or 7,000–8,000 men. K. R. Böhme and Peter Englund give a lower estimate of about 4,500 men, of which 1,000 were soldiers, and the rest were peasants.

On 14 January, after three days of resistance from the Danish garrison, the Swedish army formed up in front of the Danish earthworks. Once the Swedes began advancing toward the Danish positions, the Danish troops inside laid down their weapons and surrendered to the Swedes without a fight. Prior to the surrender, Anders Bille had evacuated to Funen with officers, regimental colors, and as many soldiers as possible, with Swedish historian Arnold Munthe specifying 1,000 soldiers being evacuated.

== Aftermath ==
After Snoghøj capitulated, around 4,500 Danes were captured by the Swedes, and the 1,000 professional soldiers were forced to enter Swedish service. The peasants were sent home after swearing an oath not to fight in the war again.

== See also ==
- Storming of Christianspris – Part of the Torstenson War
- Siege of Hammershus – Part of the Torstenson War
