= Torsten Stålhandske =

17th-century Swedish professional soldier (1593–1644)

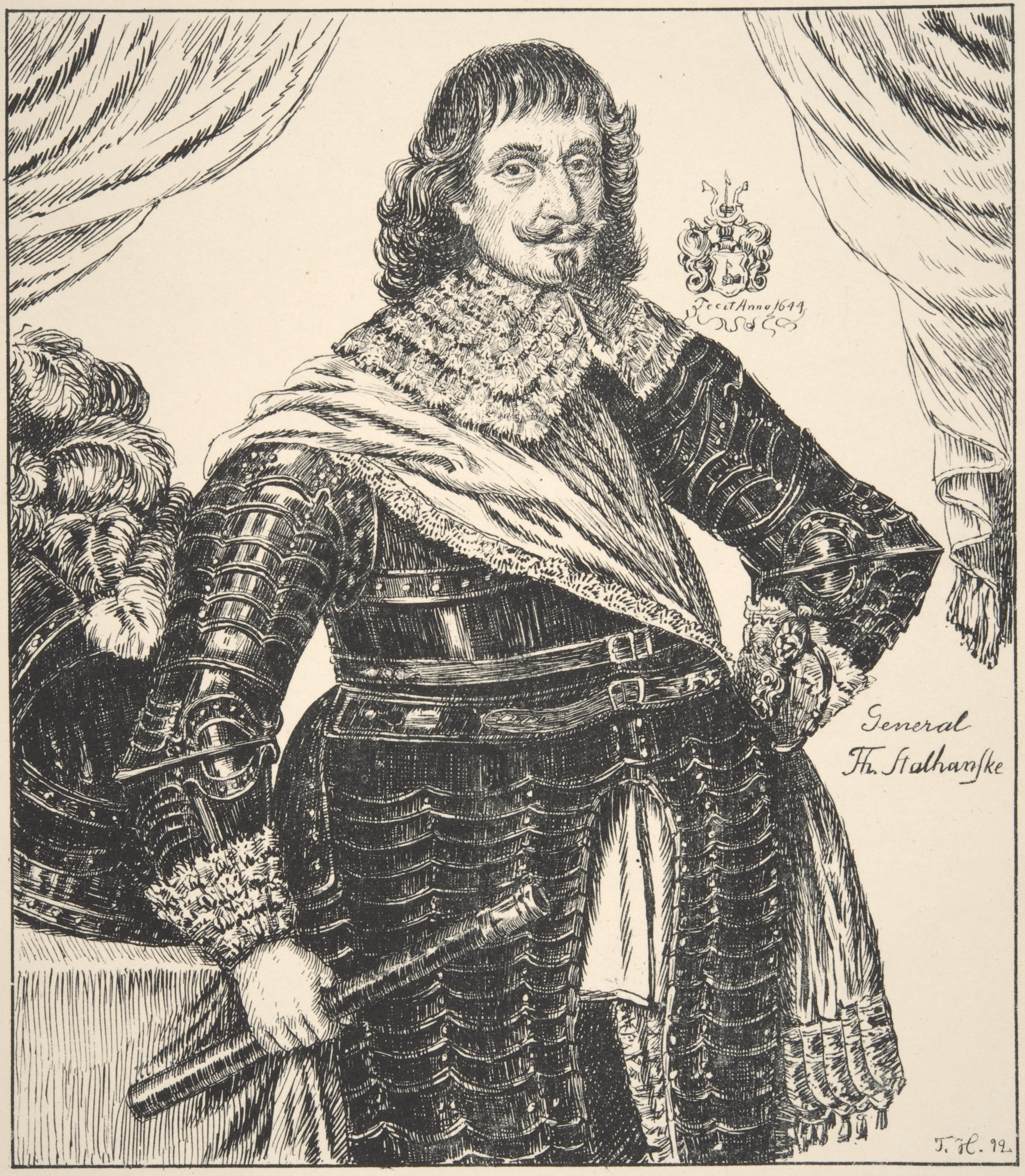
- Torsten Stålhandske, 19th century reproduction of 1644 original
- Born: 1 September 1593; Porvoo, Finland
- Died: 21 April 1644 (aged 50) Haderslev, Denmark
- Buried: Turku Cathedral
- Allegiance: (yes) Swedish Empire
- Conflicts: Ingrian War; Polish–Swedish War (1621–1625); Polish–Swedish War (1626–1629); Thirty Years War; First Breitenfeld; Siege of Nuremberg; Battle of Oldendorf (WIA); Siege of Magdeburg (1636); Battle of Wittstock; Battle of Chemnitz; Second Breitenfeld; Torstenson War; Battle of Kolding (1644)

Torsten Stålhandske (Note: Also Stalhansk) (1 September 1593 – 21 April 1644) was a professional soldier from Porvoo in Finland, who served in the Swedish army during the Thirty Years' War. An able cavalry commander and leader of Finnish Hakkapeliitta troops, he was promoted to general in 1643.

He died of illness while on campaign in Jutland, shortly after the outbreak of the Torstenson War.

== Personal details ==
Torsten Stålhandske was born 1 September 1593 in Porvoo, Finland. His father, Torsten Svensson Stålhandske, was a recently ennobled peasant from Västergötland, who married Carin Lydiksdotter Jägerhorn. His father was killed in the battle of Stångebro, and his mother remarried Major Robert Guthrie (1560-1637), a Scot serving in the Swedish Army. He had a half sister, Catherine, from this relationship.

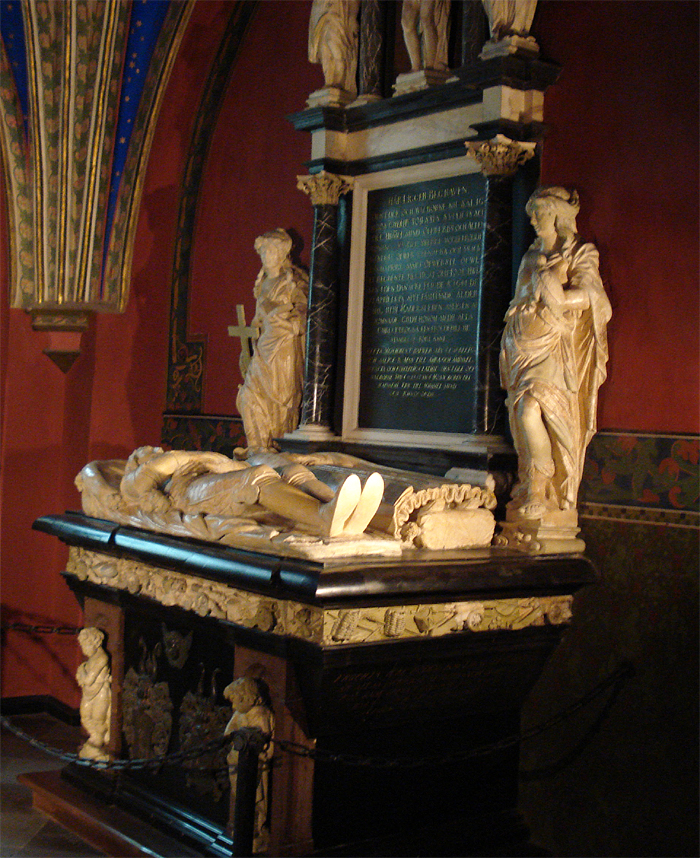
Stålhandske's tomb in Turku Cathedral

In April 1643, he married Kristina Horn (1604-1673), daughter of his former commander Arvid, in 1643, but they had no children prior to his death a year later. Their tomb can be seen in Turku Cathedral.

== Career ==
During the first half of the 17th century, Sweden fought a series of expansionist wars against its neighbours. This created a huge demand for soldiers from across Europe, including many Scots like Guthrie, through whom Stålhandske gained a post as page to another Scot in Swedish service, Patrick Ruthven. He served with the latter in Russia during the Ingrian War, and in 1614 accompanied him on a recruiting trip to Scotland.

Stålhandske participated in the Polish–Swedish War (1621–1625), most of which took place in Livonia. When fighting restarted in 1626, he was a major in an infantry regiment commanded by Arvid Horn. Reforms enacted by Gustavus Adolphus included significant upgrades in the quality and numbers of the Swedish horse. As part of this process, in 1627 Stålhandske transferred to a cavalry unit led by Åke Henriksson Tott.

Key locations in text

When Sweden entered the Thirty Years' War under Gustavus Adolphus in 1630, Stålhandske was lieutenant-colonel in a regiment of Hakkapeliitta light cavalry. He fought at First Breitenfield in November 1631, became colonel in 1632, and took part in the siege of Nuremberg. His charges helped the Swedes win a narrow victory at Lützen in November 1632, despite the death of Gustavus Adolphus.

In July 1633, Stålhandske was slightly wounded in the Swedish victory at Oldendorf. In September, he moved to Liège to support a Dutch assault on Brabant, but his unpaid troops mutinied and were quickly returned to Swedish control.

At the beginning of the following year, he transferred to Livonia as major-general of cavalry, in preparation for a new campaign against Poland. When this failed to take place, he returned to the main army in Germany led by Johan Banér. Over the next few years, he took part in numerous battles, including Wittstock, Chemnitz, and the capture of Mělník.

Stålhandske was rewarded in August 1639 with an appointment as commander of Swedish troops in Silesia. Despite shortages of both men and supplies, he maintained his position against Imperial troops until April 1642, when his 5,000 men were joined on the Oder by the main army under Lennart Torstenson. Following a successful campaign in Silesia, their combined forces won a significant victory at Second Breitenfeld, where Stålhandske was seriously wounded leading a series of charges that broke the Imperial left wing.

The next few months were spent recuperating in Stettin, where he married Katherine Horn in April 1643. Promoted to general and overall commander of Swedish cavalry in Germany, Stålhandske rejoined Torstensson in May to campaign in Moravia. He was assigned to the surprise attack on Denmark in November, and on 9 January 1644 defeated a Danish force in Jutland at Kolding. He became ill shortly afterwards, and died in Haderslev on 21 April 1644.

== Sources ==
- Janzon, Kaj (2024). "Torsten Stålhandske" (in Swedish). Swedish Biographical Dictionary.
- Murdoch, Steve (2006). Scottish Kin, Commercial and Covert Associations in Northern Europe, 1603-1746. Brill.
- Syrjö, Veli-Matti. "Stålhandske, Torsten (1594 - 1644)". National Biography of Finland.
- Williamson, Mitch (13 December 2024). "The Military Revolution—Dutch and Swedish Reforms I". WarHistory.org.
- Wilson, Peter H. (2009). Europe's Tragedy: A History of the Thirty Years War. Allen Lane. ISBN 978-0-7139-9592-3.
