= Invasion of Courland (1658) =

Swedish invasion of Courland in 1658

- Part of Second Northern War
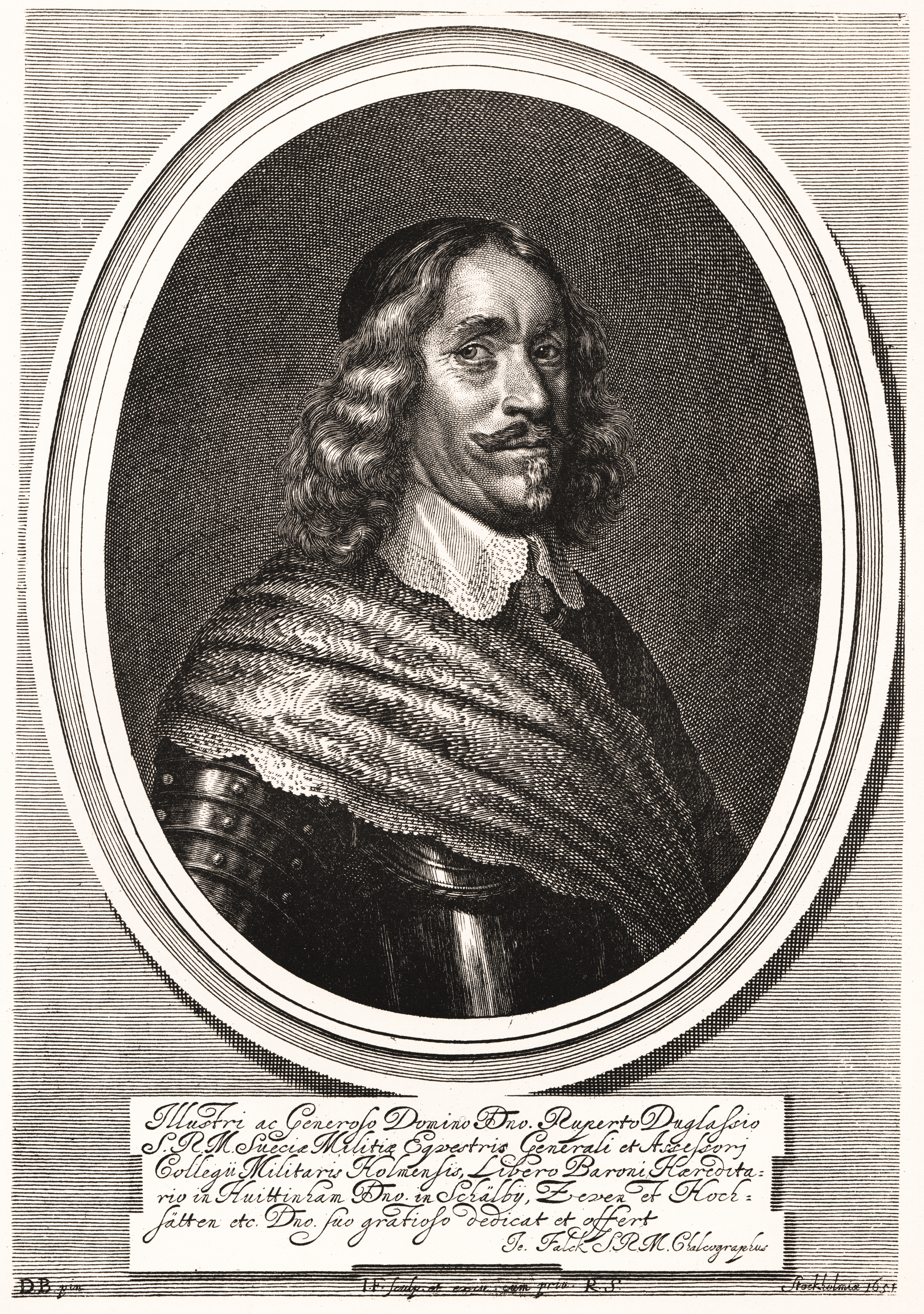
- Engraving of Robert Douglas
Date	27 August / Early September – 10 October 1658
Location	Courland
Result	Swedish victory
Territorial changes	Courland and Mitau are occupied by Swedish forces Tobago occupied by the Dutch.

Belligerents
(Swedish Empire) Sweden	Duchy of Courland

Commanders and leaders
(Swedish Empire) Robert Douglas (Swedish Empire) Nils Bååt (Swedish Empire) Jakob von Yxkull (Swedish Empire) Otto Wilhelm von Fersen	(Courland) Jacob Kettler (POW)

Strength
1,652–1,700 infantry 2,800–3,721 cavalry Several River barges	14,000

The Invasion of Courland (1658) (Swedish: Invasionen av Kurland) was a Swedish campaign against the Duchy of Courland in 1658. It was led by Robert Douglas and resulted in the Swedes occupying Courland, capturing Mitau and the Duke of Courland. The initial invasion only lasted a few months, however the Swedes remained in Courland for 2 years.

== Background ==
In the spring of 1658, Swedish attention turned towards Courland. The Swedish king, Charles X Gustav, no longer wanted to use diplomacy and Robert Douglas was ordered to conquer the Duchy. Before the invasion of Courland began, the Swedes retook the Livonian fortresses that were still under Lithuanian occupation. A reason for King Charles wanting Robert Douglas in Livonia was the need to deal with Courland. The Duke of Courland, Jacob Kettler, was an efficient entrepreneur who had managed to establish colonies and tried to stay neutral in the war between Sweden and Poland–Lithuania, assembling an army of 14,000 troops in order to make its neighbors respect its neutrality. The ports of Courland were also a part of Charles' plan to take control of the entire Baltic shore.

=== Swedish plan ===
The Swedish plan went as follows: The Swedes would invade Courland, and force the Duke to hand over Mitau and Bauske. If the Duke were to refuse, he was to be arrested and all Courlandish ships were to be captured. When this was done, the entirety of Courland was to be quickly occupied, the Swedish army was also to be supplied by the countryside.

== Invasion ==
In late August or early September, Robert Douglas began his march into Courland with 1,652–1,700 infantry and 2,800–3,721 cavalry. The invasion involved deception, since at first Douglas informed the Duke that they were only marching through his territory on an expedition to northern Lithuania. The duke, suspicious but not in a position to protest, admitted entry to the Swedish army. Because of the Duke's vigilance, Douglas had to temporarily postpone the attack on Courland's capital, Mitau. Instead, Douglas continued deceiving the Duke, and marched his army into Lithuania, soon afterwards, however, the Swedes returned into Courland. This time, they marched straight towards Mitau. To alleviate any worries that the Duke may have had, Douglas began negotiations for supply deliveries to his army and the Riga garrison. His entry into Mitau to negotiate allowed him and several officers to survey its defenses.

The town itself seemingly did not pose any particular problem, but to capture the castle, the Swedes needed further preparations. Realizing that more infantry was needed to capture the castle, Douglas again postponed his attack. The negotiations between Sweden and Courland continued. The duke found himself forced to accept Swedish security guarantees in exchange for Sweden's acceptance of Courland's neutrality. Meanwhile, Douglas continued final preparations for the surprise assault on Mitau, all while he claimed that Lithuania was the real target. Because of heavy rain and high water levels, preparations took longer than expected. Claiming that a number of his soldiers were sick and had to be sent to Riga, Douglas borrowed several river barges from the Duke.

On the 9th of October, the Swedes finally moved on Mitau, Major General Nils Bååt with a force of 500 musketeers embarked on the fleet of barges. The barges would float with the stream so to avoid any unnecessary noises. When they reached their destination, the men would disembark and carry out a surprise attack at night on Mitau Castle. Simultaneously, Colonel Jacob von Yxkull would lead 400 soldiers in an assault on the town gates. He would also block enemy reinforcements from reaching them. Colonel Otto Wilhelm von Fersen would also bring a small cavalry force to eliminate the observation post which the Duke had deployed outside the town.

The Swedish assault was successful, Courlandian opposition was minimal, and Jacob's 14,000 untrained peasant troops were unable to defeat the well trained Swedish army. In the morning of 10 October, all of Mitau had been occupied by Sweden, and the Duke was placed under arrest alongside his family, and court.

== Aftermath ==
Soon after the assault, Douglas also occupied the Courlandian towns of Bauske, and Doblen. After a few weeks, the Duke was sent to Riga. After intense international pressure and negotiations, Sweden finally agreed to withdraw from Courland in return for the island of Rüno and some territory on the Daugava. Prince Jacob Kettler was in captivity for two years, and was released only after the conclusion of peace between the Polish–Lithuanian Commonwealth and Sweden in 1660.
