= Battle of Kolding (1644) =

Part the Torstenson War

- Part of the Torstenson War
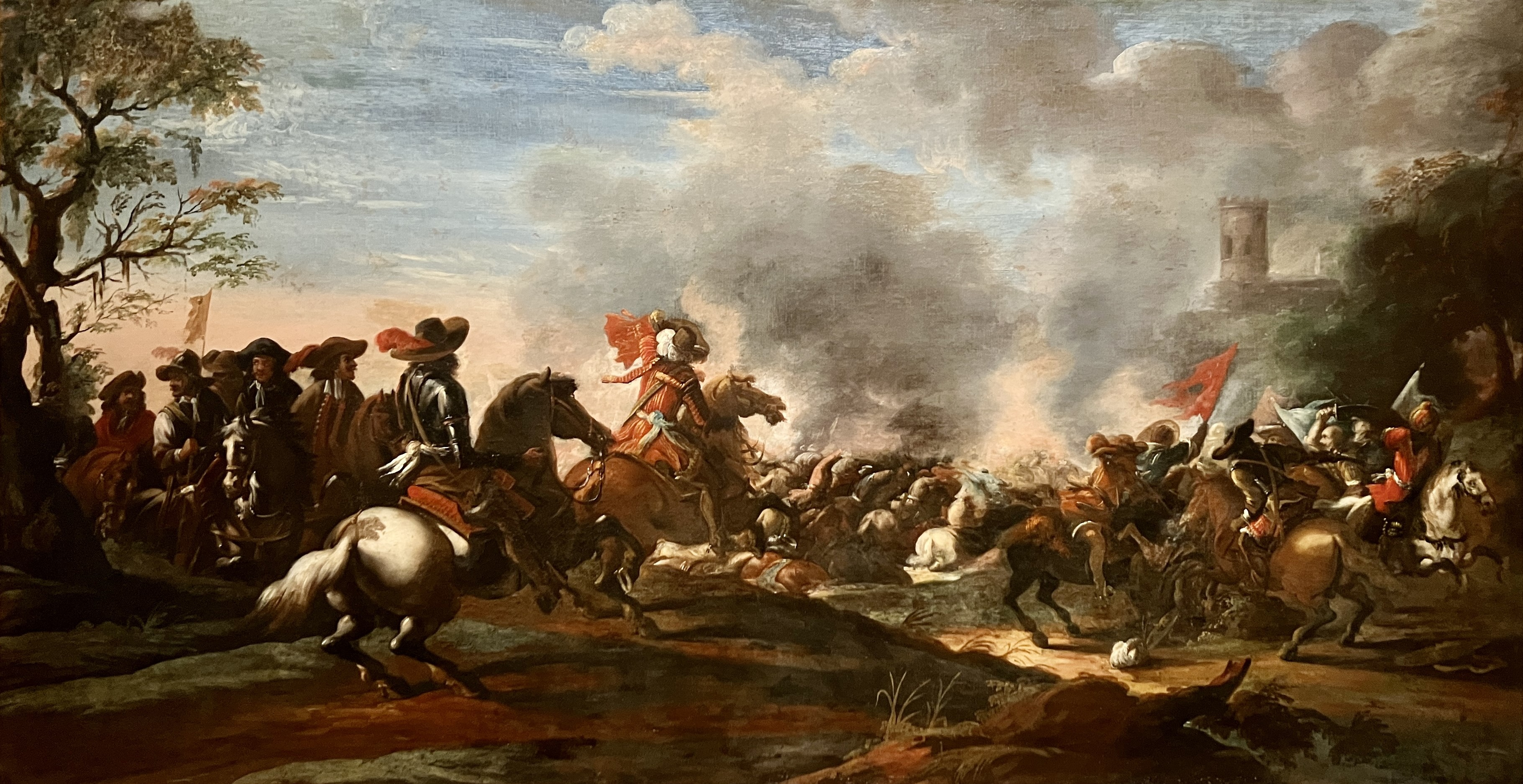
- Swedish cavalry engagement
Date	January 9, 1644
Location	Kolding, Denmark
Result	Swedish victory

Belligerents
(yes) Swedish Empire	Denmark-Norway

Commanders and leaders
(yes) Torsten Stålhandske (yes) Robert Douglas	Friedrich von Buchwald (POW)

Strength
7,000	1,400–1,900 cavalry

Casualties and losses
Insignificant	Insignificant

The battle of Kolding (Note: Danish: slaget ved Kolding) took place on 9 January 1644 outside Kolding in Jutland. In the opening engagement of the Torstenson War, a Swedish cavalry force under Torsten Stålhandske scattered a Danish detachment led by Frederik von Buchwald.

== Background ==
Long-standing competitors in the Baltic Sea, Swedish intervention in the Thirty Years' War led to increasing tension with Denmark. Concern over attempts by Christian IV to influence negotiations to end the war, combined with increases in tolls levied by Denmark on Baltic trade, Swedish Chancellor Axel Oxenstierna decided to initiate the Torstensson War. In December 1643, Swedish troops occupied the Danish territories of Halland and Blekinge, while Torsten Stålhandske advanced into Jutland.

== Battle ==
Stålhandske was besieging Kolding in eastern Jutland, when on 9 January 1644 his troops were confronted by 1,400 to 1,900 cavalry under Friedrich von Buchwald, whose family owned large estates in the area. The Danes were hastily assembled and poorly trained, while their opponents were experienced veterans of the Thirty Years' War. The Swedes, under Robert Douglas, charged their opponents, who retreated after some short but heavy fighting. However, Buchwald was captured.

== Aftermath ==
The Danes fled north to Snoghøj, which surrendered on 14 January. Kolding was pillaged by the Swedes and the road north was open. The battle was, as mentioned, mainly a cavalry battle so most of the Dano-Norwegian soldiers escaped without injury and the casualties on both side were quite small.

== Sources ==
- Wilson, Peter H. (2009). Europe's Tragedy: A History of the Thirty Years War. Allen Lane. ISBN 978-0-7139-9592-3.
- Englund, Peter (1993). Ofredsår: om den Svenska Stormaktstiden och en man i dess mitt [Years of unrest: about the Swedish Empire and a man in its midst] (in Swedish). Stockholm: Atlantis. ISBN 9789174863499.
- von Essen, Michael Fredholm (2020). The Lion from the North: The Swedish Army during the Thirty Years War 1632-48. Vol. 2. Helion & Company. ISBN 9781913118839.

== Related reading ==
- Sundberg, Ulf (1998) Swedish Wars, 1521-1814 (Stockholm : Hjalmarson & Högberg) ISBN 9189080149
- Stiles, Andrina (1992) Sweden and the Baltic, 1523–1721 (Hodder & Stoughton) 1992 ISBN 0-340-54644-1
- Lisk, Jill (1967) The Struggle for Supremacy in the Baltic: 1600–1725 (New York City: Funk & Wagnalls)
- Frost, Robert I. (2000) The Northern Wars, 1558–1721 (Longman: Harlow Publication) ISBN 0-582-06429-5
