= Robert Douglas, Count of Skenninge =

Scottish professional soldier (1611-1662)

Robert Douglas
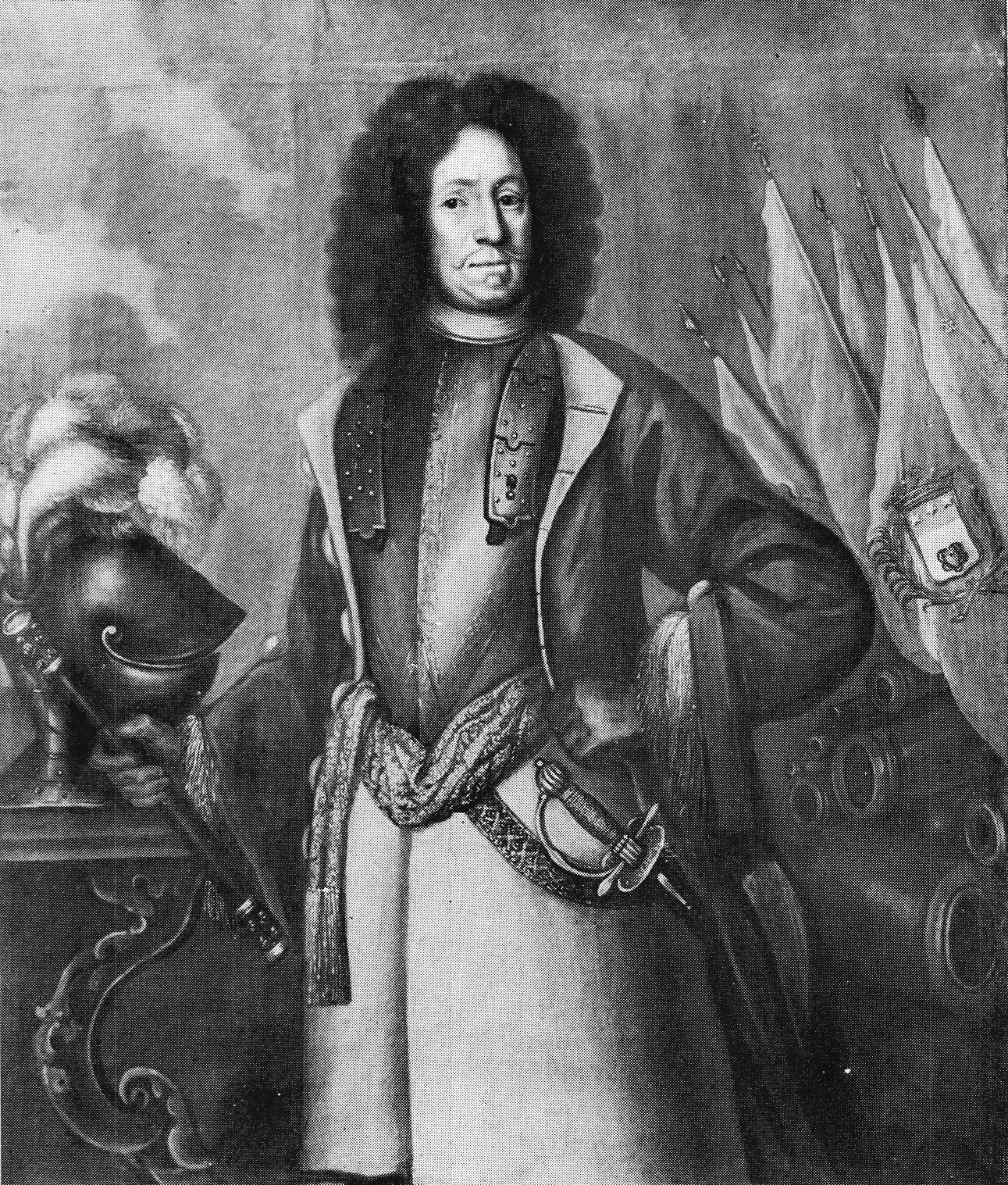
- Robert Douglas
- Born: 17 March 1611; Standingstone, East Lothian, Scotland
- Died: 28 May 1662 (aged 51); Stockholm
- Military career
- Rank: Field marshal
- Conflicts: Thirty Years' War; Battle of Wittstock; Battle of Chemnitz; Second Battle of Breitenfeld; Battle of Jankau; Torstensson War; Torstensson's Jutland campaign; Battle of Kolding (1644); Second Northern War; Siege of Warsaw; Invasion of Courland

Robert Douglas (17 March 1611 – 28 May 1662), was a professional soldier from East Lothian in Scotland. He spent his career in the Swedish Army and became a field marshal in 1657. He settled in Sweden, where the Douglas family remains prominent.

== Personal details ==
Douglas was born at Standingstone, near Garvald, East Lothian. His father, Patrick Douglas of Standingstone (d. 1626), was a son of William Douglas of Whittinghame (d. 1595) by his spouse Elizabeth, daughter of Sir Richard Maitland of Lethington.

== Career ==
Many Scottish soldiers, infantry and cavalry, found themselves engaged in the various wars that are collectively called the Thirty Years' War, and Douglas was one of these. In 1627, he was received as a page in Swedish service under John Casimir, Count Palatine of Kleeburg, castellan of Stegeborg Castle and brother-in-law of King Gustav II Adolf.

In 1630, when Sweden joined the Thirty Years' War, Douglas followed the main army into Germany (where he joined the German literary society Der Fruchtbringenden Gesellschaft). Although a competent military commander, he only began to earn some notoriety in the aftermath of the Peace of Prague (1635). Then serving as a lieutenant colonel, Douglas had been tasked with the defence of Egeln in Saxony, and so was left very much within the territory of the newly hostile Elector Johan Georg, who had defected to the Empire. Douglas spectacularly broke out rather than change sides and managed to return with most of his men through hostile lines to Swedish-controlled territory He participated in the Battle of Wittstock the following year, now with the rank of full colonel and actually in command of two cavalry regiments. With these, he participated in the famous flanking charge led by Lieutenant General James King, the senior cavalry commander in Alexander Leslie's Army of the Weser.

Unlike many of his countrymen who opted to return to Scotland to participate in the Bishops' Wars against Charles I, Douglas chose or was selected to remain behind in Swedish service. In March 1638, he was campaigning in the region of Delitzsch in the army of Johan Banér, getting complaints from the town for his alleged 'deprivations'. Within days, units under Major General Adam von Pfuel pressed into Thuringia, with Douglas's regiment among them. It was during this period that the Scot captured the Imperial Fälttygmästare (master of ordinance) Salis and his regiments, who were heading towards Eger (Cheb) in Bohemia. He pressed the captured troops into his service and participated with them at the Swedish victory at battle of Chemnitz.

By 1642, Douglas served in the army of Field Marshal Lennart Torstensson – under whom he campaigned in Silesia before participating at the battle of Leipzig, where he was accredited with playing a significant part in the victory. He also participated in Torstensson's invasion into Jutland, achieving a victory at Kolding in 1644. For this and other services, Douglas was promoted to major general, though not without protest from some of his German co-commanders. Nevertheless, his reputation continued to grow. At the battle of Jankowitz in 1645, Douglas commanded the left wing of the Swedish army, with some twenty-three out of forty-seven of the cavalry units on the field under his control.

In December 1646, Douglas received instructions to travel to Ulm as one of Sweden's representatives to negotiate a ceasefire with Maximillian of Bavaria. This was eventually agreed on 14 March 1647. However, when Douglas returned to Sweden in June to brief the Riksråd on the progress of negotiations, he delivered the news that the Bavarian truce had effectively expired. For his good offices as both soldier and negotiator, Douglas was promoted to the rank of lieutenant general, at which station he saw out the remainder of the war, seeing his last main action at Zusmarshausen in May 1648. On the conclusion of hostilities, Douglas was tasked with the reduction and dismissal of the troops around Ulm and Schwaben.

Queen Christina of Sweden ennobled him as a baron in 1651, and on 28 May 1654, she made him a count. In 1652, she made him the kingdom's Lord Master of the Horse. In the Polish Wars, Douglas was in the service of King Charles X. He was with the king at the battle of Warsaw in 1656. On 13 May 1657, the king promoted him to field marshal.

He served between 1658 and 1661 as military governor of Estonia and Livonia. In 1660, he and the Swedes took Jacob, Duke of Courland, as their prisoner. He also led the Swedish forces in the conquests of Valmiera and Mitau.

Douglas was rewarded with numerous properties and fiefs in Sweden, such as Skänninge, Skälby, Zewen and Sannegården near Göteborg.

== Family ==
In 1646, Douglas married Hedvig Mörner, who bore him six sons (of whom four lived to adulthood) and a daughter. Three sons became officers and died without issue. The daughter married an Oxenstierna.

The remaining son, Gustaf, was the first of the Swedish-born noble line of Douglas. He became a colonel and Governor of Västerbotten. The Swedish noble family of Douglas descends from him.

His grandson, Count Gustav Otto Douglas, was captured by the Russians during the Battle of Poltava, entered Russian service, and in 1717 was made Peter the Great's Governor General over Finland. In the 1890s, the then head of the family, Count Ludvig Douglas, was the Swedish foreign minister and Marshal of the Realm. His father, Count Carl Israel Douglas (1824–1898), had married a morganatic daughter of Louis I, Grand Duke of Baden – who inherited Langenstein Castle and Gondelsheim Castle – and became thus the first count of the Douglas family in the nobility of Baden in 1848. Ludvig Douglas' son, General Archibald Douglas-Stjernorp, was the Chief of the Swedish Army during World War II.

Robert Douglas is buried in the Douglas chapel at the church of Vreta Abbey.

== Sources ==
- C. Conermann, Die Mitglieder Der Fruchtbringenden Gesellschaft 1617-1650 (Weinheim, 1985), III, no.420, pp. 502–503.
- Archibald Douglas, Robert Douglas: en krigaregestalt från vår storhetstid (Stockholm, 1957)
- Alexia Grosjean, 'A century of Scottish Governorship in the Swedish Empire, 1574-1700' in A. Mackillop and Steve Murdoch, Military Governors and Imperial Frontiers, 1600-1800: A Study of Scotland and Empires (Brill, Leiden, 2003), pp. 53–78.
- Steve Murdoch and Alexia Grosjean, Alexander Leslie and the Scottish Generals of the Thirty Years' War, 1618-1648 (London, 2014).
- Atina Nihtinen, 'Field Marshal James Keith: Governor of Ukraine and Finland, 1740-1745' in A. Mackillop and Steve Murdoch, Military Governors and Imperial Frontiers, 1600-1800: A Study of Scotland and Empires (Brill, Leiden, 2003), p. 99.

== Primary Sources ==
- Swedish Riksarkiv, Adolf Johans Arkiv i Stegeborgssamlingen: 81 letters of Robert Douglas to Duke Adolf Johan, 1652–1661;
- Swedish Krigsarkiv, Muster Roll, 1631/22-24; 1659/13, 1660/4, 11, 17
