= Anders Bille =

Danish general (1600–1657)

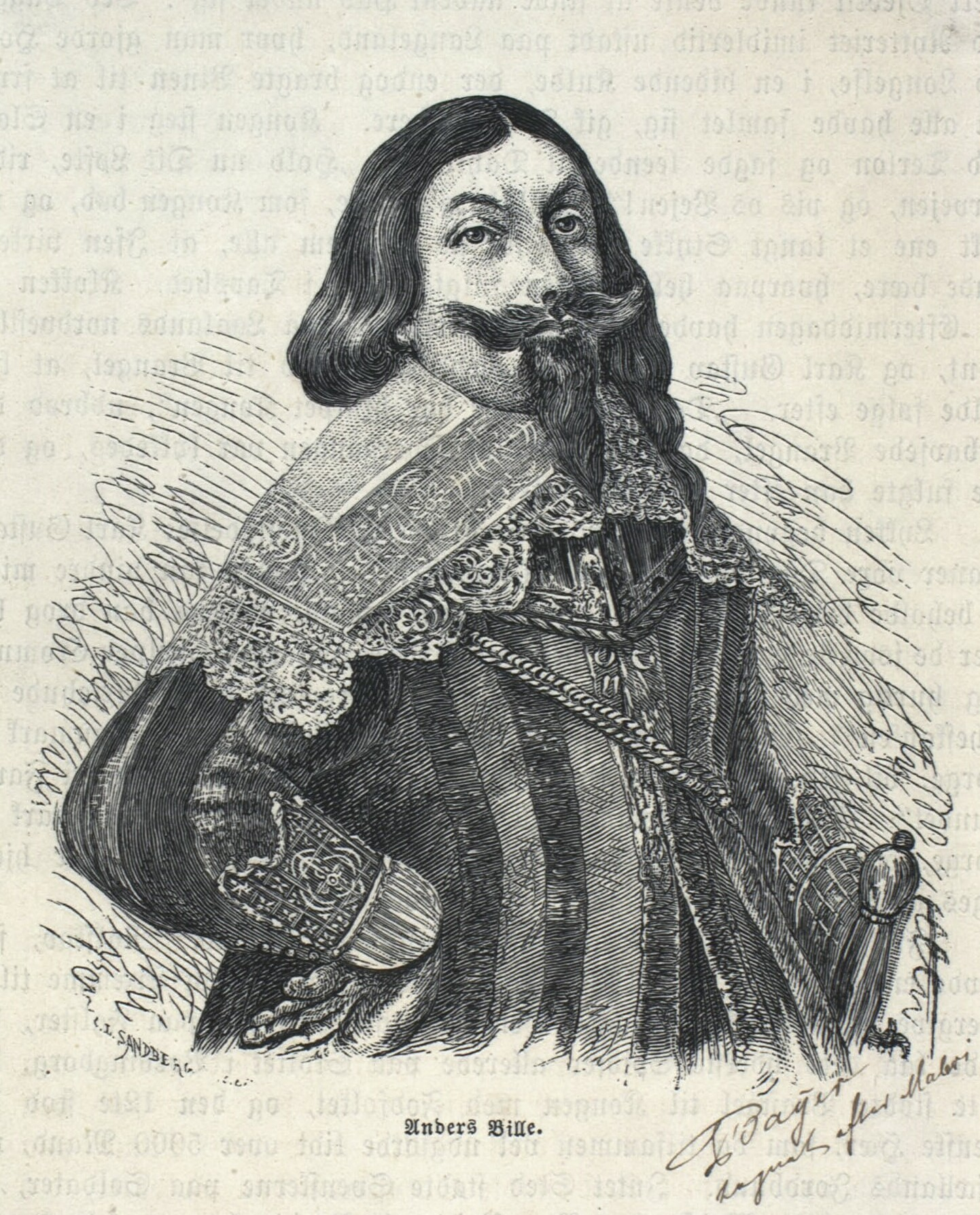
Anders Bille

Anders Bille (19 March 1600 – 10 November 1657) was the Danish Rigsmarsk, the officer leading the entire armed forces of Denmark, from 1642.

From 1635 to 1643, Bille was the Governor of Ösel (Saaremaa). In 1644 during the Torstenson War, he briefly led the Danish garrison at Snoghøj when it was being besieged by Lennart Torstensson, but he evacuated before it fell. On 1 May of the same year, he recaptured Kolding which had previously been occupied by a Swedish garrison.

Bille was mortally wounded in the defence of Fredriksodde during the Northern Wars against Sweden, and died after a few days in captivity. He was a member of the Bille family.

== Works cited ==
- Englund, Peter (1993). Ofredsår: om den Svenska Stormaktstiden och en man i dess mitt [Years of unrest: about the Swedish Empire and a man in its midst] (in Swedish). Stockholm: Atlantis. ISBN 9789174863499.
- Munthe, Arnold [in Swedish] (1908). Klas Fleming, Karl Gustaf Wrangel, Martin Thijsen Anckarhielm, Danska kriget 1643–1645: Omfattande tiden till Juli 1644 [Klas Fleming, Carl Gustaf Wrangel, Martin Thijsen Anckarhielm, the Danish war 1643–1645: Covering the period until July 1644] (PDF). Svenska sjöhjältar (in Swedish). Vol. 5:1. Stockholm: P. A. Norstedt & Söners förlag.
