= Torstenson War =

Conflict between Sweden and Denmark–Norway from 1643 to 1645

- Part of Dano-Swedish Wars and Thirty Years' War
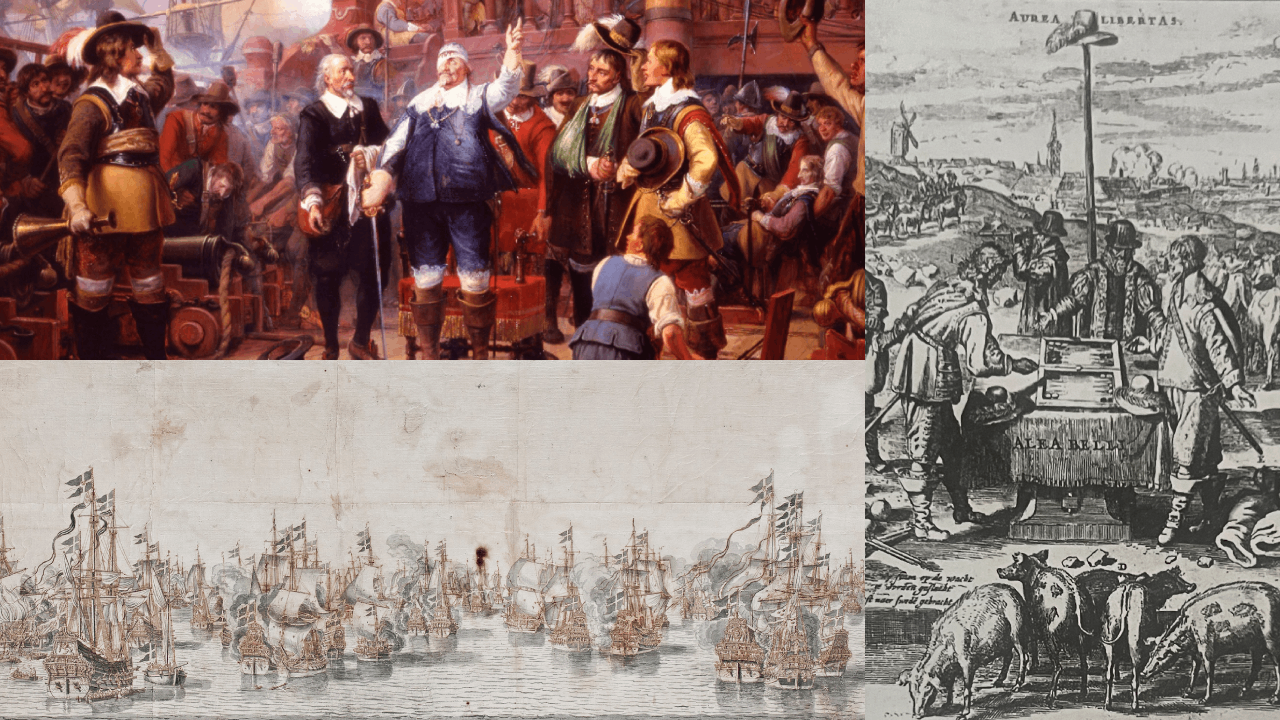
- Clockwise from top: Battle of Colberger Heide; Battle of Fehmarn; The Game of War by Crispijn van de Passe the Younger (1644).
Date	1643–1645 (Note: Hostilities briefly resumed in 1646)
Location	Northern Europe
Result	Swedish victory
Territorial changes	Jämtland, Härjedalen, Idre, Särna, Gotland, and Ösel become Swedish territories. Halland ceded to Sweden for a period of 30 years as a guarantee.

Belligerents
(yes) Swedish Empire	Denmark–Norway

Commanders and leaders
(Swedish Empire) Christina (Swedish Empire) Axel Oxenstierna (Swedish Empire) Lennart Torstenson (Swedish Empire) Gustav Horn (Swedish Empire) Carl Gustaf Wrangel (Swedish Empire) Helmut Wrangel (Swedish Empire) Mårten Anckarhielm (Swedish Empire) Lars Kagg	Christian IV; Hannibal Sehested; Anders Bille; Ebbe Ulfeldt; Jacob Ulfeldt (Denmark–Norway) Henrik Bjelke (Denmark–Norway) Pros Mund † (Holy Roman Empire) Matthias Gallas

The Torstenson War, (Note: Danish: Torstenssonfejden; Swedish: Torstensonska kriget. Also known as the Dano-Swedish War of 1643–1645 and the Hannibal controversy or Hannibal War (Norwegian: Hannibalfeiden) after governor-general of Norway, Hannibal Sehested.) 1643 to 1645, was fought between Sweden and Denmark–Norway. The name derives from Swedish general Lennart Torstenson, and it is considered a related conflict of the Thirty Years' War.

Denmark–Norway had withdrawn from the Thirty Years' War in the 1629 Treaty of Lübeck. After its victories in the war, Sweden felt it had to attack Denmark–Norway due to its advantageous geographical position in relation to Sweden. Sweden invaded in a short two-year war. In the Second Treaty of Brömsebro (1645), which concluded the war, Denmark–Norway had to make huge territorial concessions and exempt Sweden from the Sound Dues, de facto acknowledging the end of the Danish-Norwegian, and the start of the Swedish, dominium maris baltici. Dano–Norwegian efforts to reverse this result in the Second Northern, Scanian and Great Northern wars failed.

== Background ==
Sweden had been highly successful in the Thirty Years' War, having defeated Imperial armies in Germany and seen substantial victories under Gustavus Adolphus and after his death, under the leadership of Count Axel Oxenstierna, Lord High Chancellor of Sweden. At the same time, Sweden was continually threatened by Denmark–Norway, which almost completely encircled Sweden from the south (Blekinge, Scania and Halland), the west (Bohuslän) and the north-west (Jämtland and Härjedalen). The Danish Sound Dues were also a continuing source of irritation and a contributing factor to the war. In the spring of 1643 the Swedish Privy Council determined that their military strength made territorial gains at the expense of Denmark–Norway feasible. The Council drew up the plan for war and directed a surprise multi-front attack on Denmark in May.

== War ==
=== Denmark ===
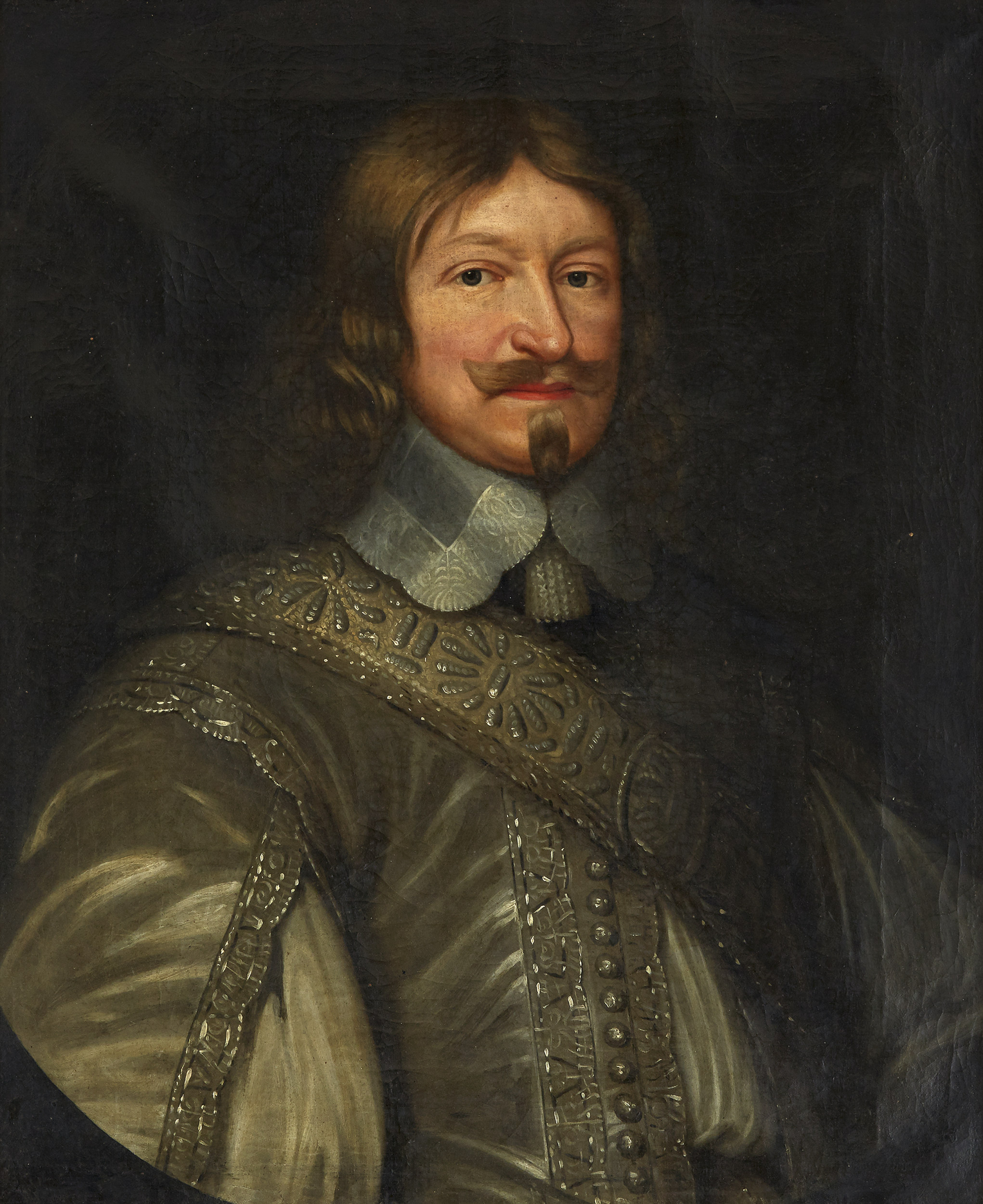
Lennart Torstenson, commander of the Swedish forces

Engagements in Denmark

Swedish Field Marshal Lennart Torstensson was ordered by Oxenstierna to march against Denmark. Proceeding from Moravia, his forces entered Danish territory in Holstein on 12 December and by the end of January 1644 the Jutland peninsula was in his possession. It was not until late December 1643 that news of Torstensson's rapid advance arrived in Copenhagen.

In February 1644, the recently released Swedish Field Marshal Gustav Horn with an army of 10,600 men occupied most of the Danish provinces of Scania, Halland and Blekinge, except for the fortress towns of Malmø and Kristianstad. Horn would also face resistance from the local Danish Snapphane in Scania.

This attack caught Denmark–Norway unaware and poorly prepared but King Christian IV retained his presence of mind. He placed his confidence in the fleet to protect the home islands, just winning the Battle of Colberger Heide on 1 July 1644 but Pros Mund suffering a decisive defeat in the Battle of Fehmarn on 13 October 1644 against the Swedish fleet, including leased Dutch ships under Mårten Anckarhielm (previously Maerten Thijssen). He also counted on the forces of Norway to relieve the pressures on Danish provinces in Scania by attacking Sweden along the Norwegian–Swedish border.

=== Norway ===
Norway, governed by Christian's son-in-law, Governor-General Hannibal Sehested, was a reluctant participant. The Norwegian populace opposed an attack on Sweden, which would only leave them open to counter-attack. Their opposition to Statholder Sehested's direction grew bitter and the war was lampooned as the "Hannibal War." The Danes cared little for Norwegian public sentiment when Denmark was threatened and Jacob Ulfeldt initiated an attack into Sweden from Norwegian Jemtland. He was driven back and Swedish troops temporarily occupied Jemtland and advanced into the Norwegian Østerdal.

In May 1644, Ulfeldt invaded Jemtland, successfully ousting the Swedes from the province after his forces captured Mörsils sconce and later Frösö sconce.

Sehested had made preparations to advance with his own army and a similar army under Henrik Bjelke into Swedish Värmland but was ordered to relieve the King in the Danish attack on Gothenburg. When Sehested arrived the King joined his fleet and performed heroically, even though wounded, preventing Torstensson's army from moving onto the Danish islands. In 1645, Lars Kagg invaded Bohuslän and bombarded Bohus Fortress. On the Norwegian front, Sehested attacked and destroyed the new Swedish city of Vänersborg. He also sent Norwegian troops under the command of Georg Reichwein Sr. across the border from Vinger and Eidskog and troops under Henrik Bjelke into Swedish Dalsland.

== Aftermath ==
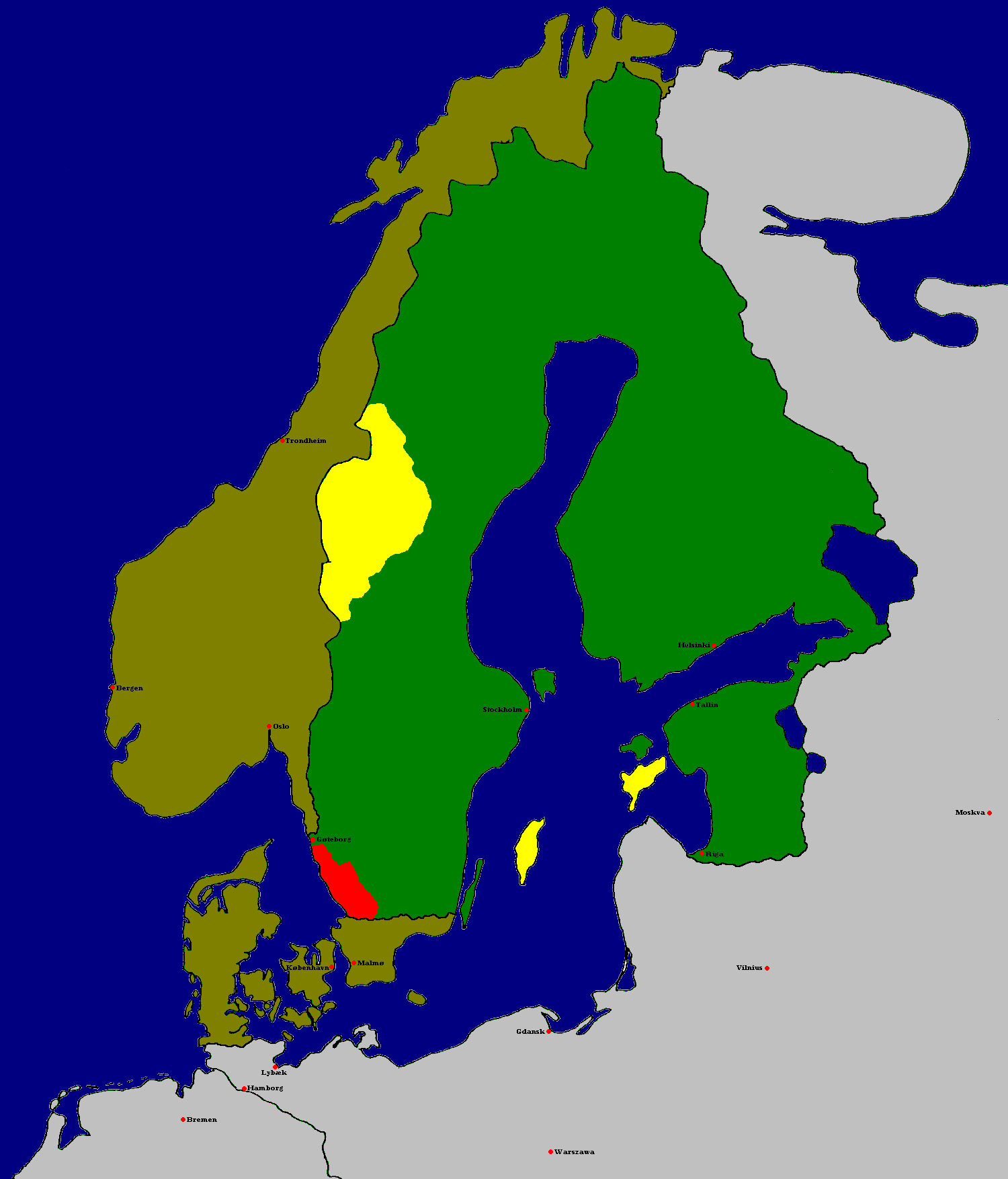
The Treaty of Brömsebro in 1645. Brown: Denmark–Norway; Green: Sweden; Yellow: the provinces of Jämtland and Härjedalen plus Idre and Särna, and the Baltic Sea islands of Gotland and Ösel, which were ceded to Sweden; Red: the province of Halland, ceded for 30 years

Christian's Danish forces were so exhausted that he was forced to accept the mediation of France and the United Provinces in suing for peace. The Peace of Brömsebro was signed on 13 August 1645, a humiliating disaster to Denmark–Norway. The Swedes were exempted from the Sound Dues, the toll for passing through Danish territory into the Baltic Sea. Denmark–Norway ceded to Sweden the Norwegian provinces of Jemtland, Herjedalen together with the towns of Idre and Serna and the strategically valuable Danish islands of Gotland (Valdemar Atterdag of Denmark had conquered the island from Sweden in 1361) in the center of the Baltic and Øsel in the Baltic Sea. In Dalarna the landshövding (chief of the land i.e. governor) raised a host of 200 dalecarlian farmers who seized the region of Särna, making it de facto Swedish territory.

Sweden occupied the Danish province of Halland as well as other territories for 30 years as a guarantee of the treaty. The heir to the thrones of Denmark–Norway, Frederick II, Administrator of the Prince-Bishopric of Verden (1634–1645) and of the Prince-Archbishopric of Bremen (1635–1645), had to resign, with the two prince-bishoprics being occupied by the Swedes. According to the Peace of Westphalia both prince-bishoprics became a fief of the Holy Roman Empire to the Swedish crown in 1648.

In 1646, hostilities briefly resumed as Sweden recaptured Bremervörde.

== Later events ==
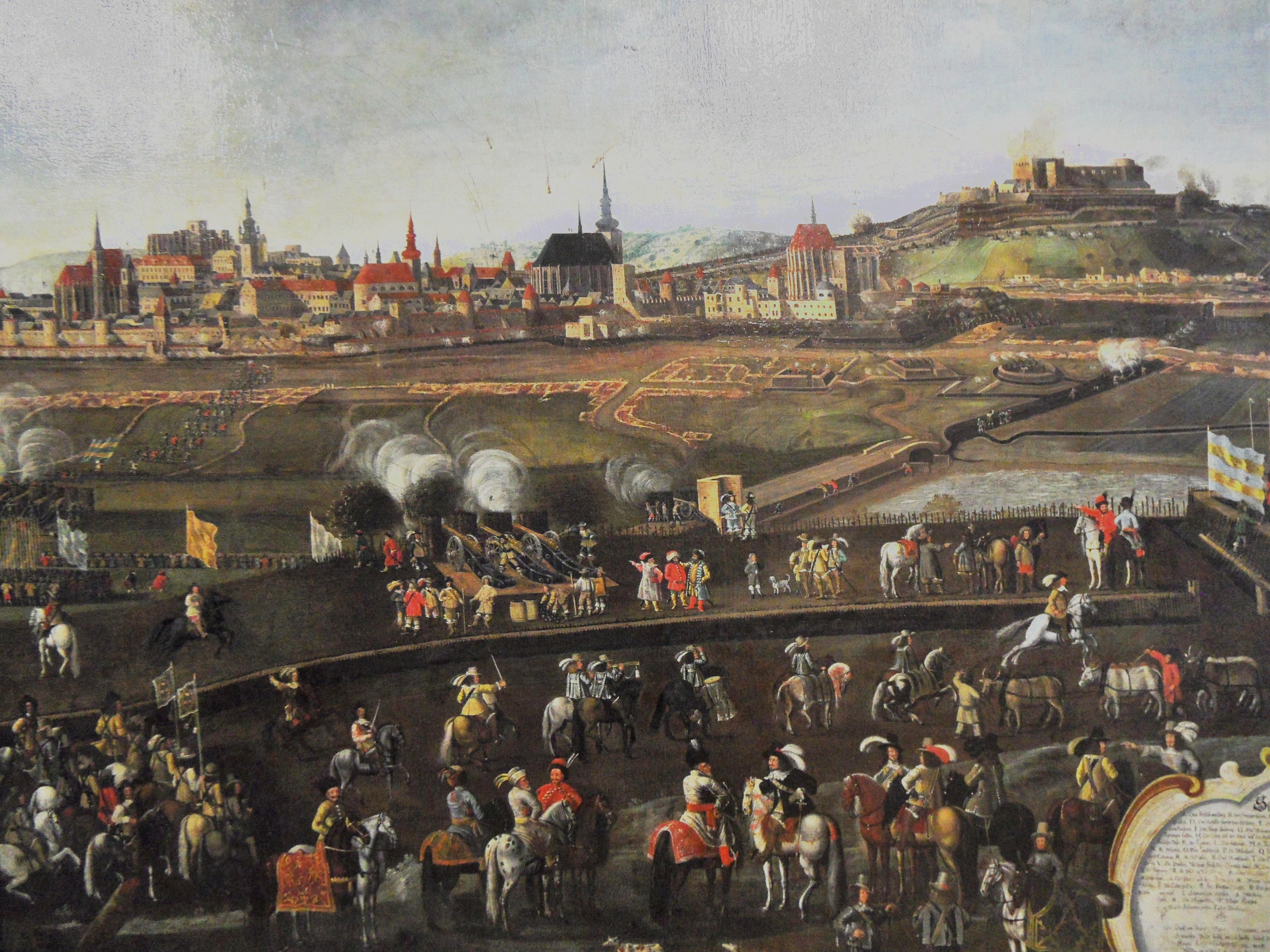
The siege of Brno in 1645, by Swedish and Transylvanian forces led by Torstenson

The defeat of Denmark–Norway reversed the historic balance of power in the Baltic. Sweden gained domination of the Baltic, unrestricted access to the North Sea and was no longer encircled by Denmark–Norway. The surprise attack assured that Denmark–Norway now looked for an opportunity to recoup their losses, while Sweden looked for opportunities to expand further, setting the stage for continued conflict on the Baltic over the next century.

With Denmark–Norway out of the war, Torstensson then pursued the Imperial army under Gallas from Jutland in Denmark south to Bohemia. At the Battle of Jankau near Prague, the Swedish army defeated the Imperial army under Gallas and could occupy Bohemian lands and threaten Prague, as well as Vienna.

== See also ==
- Dano-Swedish War (1657–1658)
- Treaty of Roskilde (1658)

== Sources ==
- Lockhart, Paul Douglas (1996). Denmark in the Thirty Years' War, 1618-1648. Susquehanna University Press. ISBN 9780945636762.
- Stiles, Andrina (1992). Sweden and the Baltic, 1523–1721. Hodder & Stoughton. ISBN 0-340-54644-1.
- Steckzén, Birger (1928). "Striden om Jämtland 1644—1645". Jämtländska Studier: Festskrift till Eric Festin (in Swedish). 3 (1) 16. Östersund: Heimbygdas Förlag: 263–294. ISSN 0347-5131. OCLC 488042179.
- Bäckström, Olli (2018). Katajala, Kimmo; Hirvonen, Helena (eds.). Snapphanar and Power States: Insurgency and the Transformation of War in Sweden and Denmark 1643–1645. Joensuu: University of Eastern Finland. ISBN 9789526129020.
