= Battle of Visseltofta =

Part of the Torstenson War

- Part of the Torstenson War
- Anonymous pencil drawing of Visseltofta church, mid-19th-century
Date	26 September 1644
Location	Visseltofta, Denmark–Norway (present-day Sweden) 56°25′36″N 13°51′15″E
Result	Swedish victory

Belligerents
(yes) Swedish Empire	Denmark–Norway

Commanders and leaders
(yes) Per Törneson (yes) Lars Nilsson	Unknown Captain †

Units involved
Unknown	Two watch units

Strength
At least 130–140 men (Note: The force consisted of 30–40 cavalry led by Törneros and 100 dragoons led by Lars Nilsson. It also had a number of peasants, though the number was not specified.)	c. 100 men

Casualties and losses
2 killed	78 killed 2 captured

The battle of Visseltofta (Note: Swedish: striden vid Visseltofta, spelled Vitseltofta in older Swedish.) occurred on 26 September 1644 during the Torstenson War between Denmark and Sweden.

In September 1644, eight farms were burned by Snapphane fighters, sparking Swedish retaliation. A force of 2,000 men was assembled, with its vanguard commanded by Lieutenant Per Törneros and Inspector Lars Nilsson. The vanguard, consisting of 30 to 40 cavalry, 100 dragoons, and some peasants, crossed into Visseltofta parish on 26 September.

On a high hill, the Swedes encountered two Danish watch units, in total around 100 men. Initially, the Danes advanced on a Swedish reconnaissance unit led by Törneros, though they withdrew once they spotted the rest of the Swedish vanguard. Soon after, the Swedes encircled the hill and attacked the Danes. Only some 20 Danes managed to escape across the Helgeå, while 78 were killed, including their captain.

== Background ==
In February 1644, a Swedish army of 10,600 or 10,800 men led by Gustav Horn invaded Scania. The invasion coincided with a Swedish invasion of Holstein and Jutland that began in December of the previous year, led by Lennart Torstensson. These invasions were part of a preemptive war plan designed by Axel Oxenstierna to neutralize the perceived Danish threat to Sweden.

=== Prelude ===
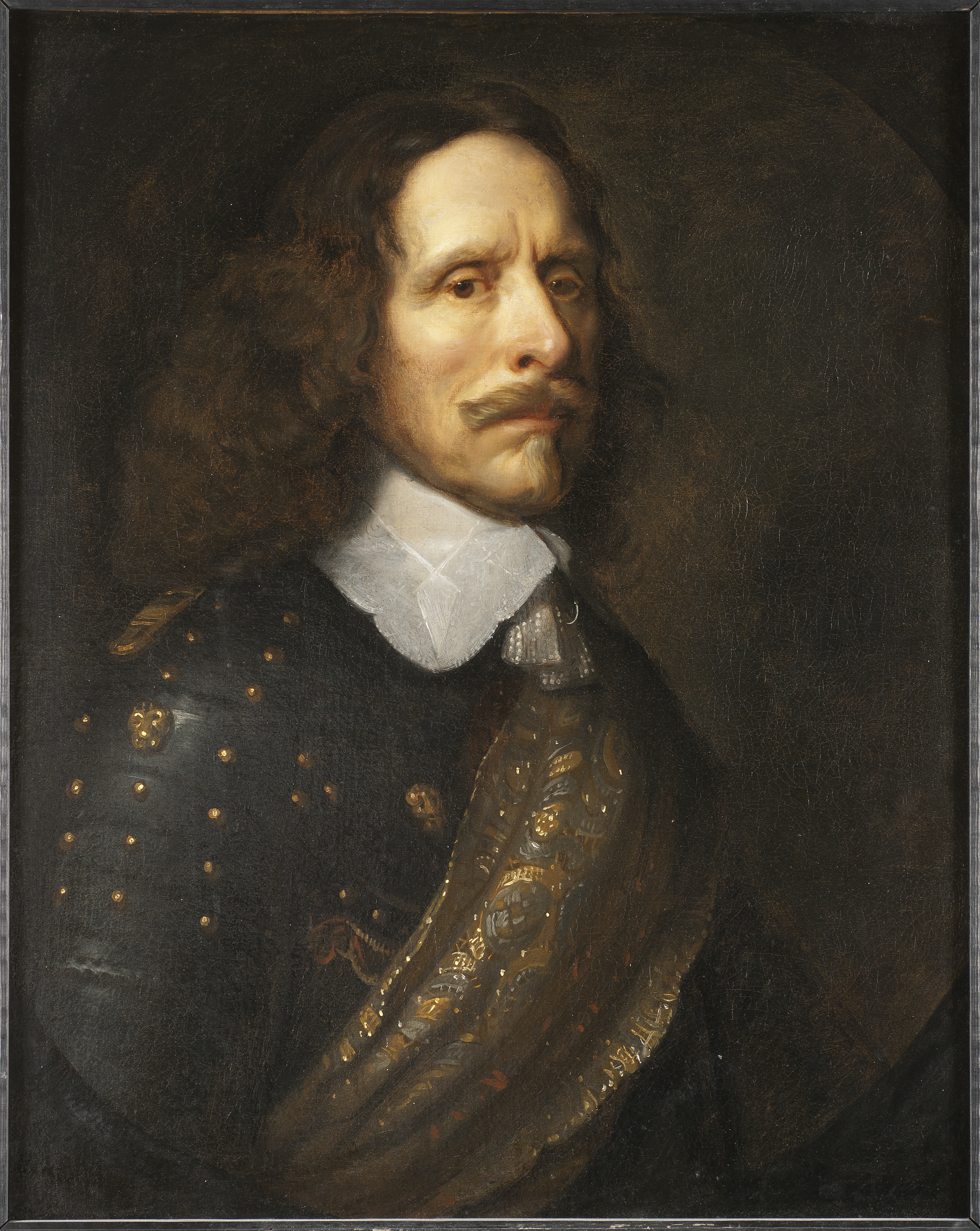
17th-century portrait of Horn by David Beck

Horn's army met essentially zero resistance as he invaded Scania, capturing Helsingborg six days after the start of the invasion. Later, he also captured the undefended Lund, and later besieged both Landskrona and Laholm.

In September 1644, Snapphane guerrilla fighters burned eight farms, sparking retaliation from the Swedes, who began assembling a force of cavalrymen, dragoons, soldiers, and peasants, totaling 2,000 men. The vanguard of this force was to be led by Lieutenant Per Törneros and Inspector Lars Nilsson.

== Battle ==
On 26 September, Törneson and Nilsson crossed into Visseltofta parish. Their force consisted of some 30 to 40 cavalry led by Törneros and 100 dragoons, along with some peasants, led by Nilsson. On a high hill inside a beech forest, they encountered a Danish border guard of around 100 peasants divided into two watch-units. Riding ahead to reconnoiter with 12 men, Törneros was attacked by the Danes who began descending the hill.

During their advance, the Danes shouted at the Swedes to come closer, calling the Swedes scoundrels and traitors. Once they spotted the remainder of the cavalry and Nilsson's force approaching, they stopped their advance and withdrew back up the hill. However, they did not stop shouting at the Swedes.

Encircling the hill, the Swedes proceeded to attack the Danes. During the fighting, 78 Danes were killed, including the Danish captain, with two others being captured. The rest of the Danes fled across the Helgeå. Only two Swedes were killed.

== Aftermath ==
Following the battle, the Swedish force returned across the border, and did not plunder the parish as it had already paid tribute.
