= Storming of Christianspris =

Part of the Torstenson War

Coordinates: 54°23′29″N 10°11′10″E

- Part of the Torstenson War
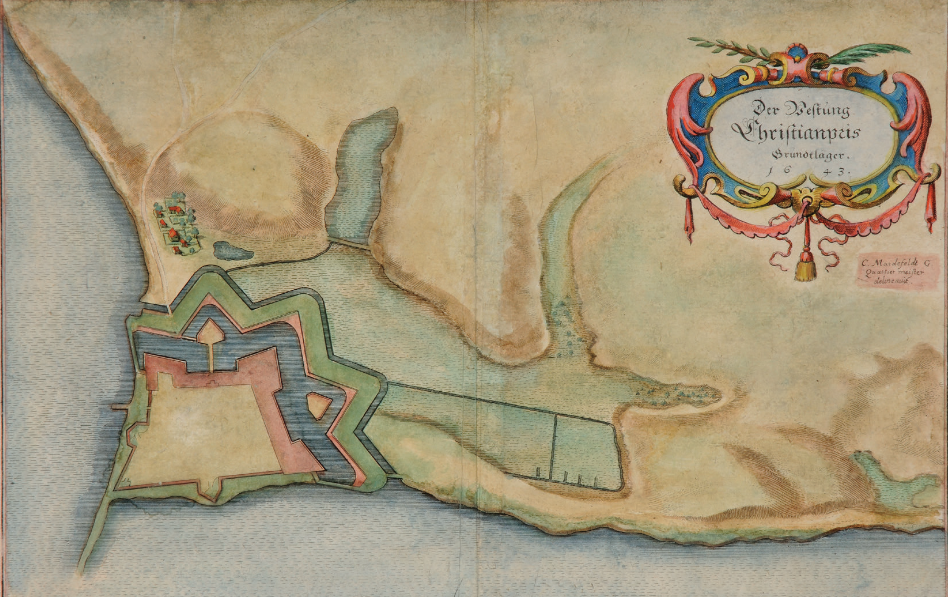
- Contemporary map of Christianspris by Conrad Mardefelt
Date	18–19 December 1643
Location	Christianspris, Denmark–Norway (present-day Friedrichsort, Germany)
Result	Swedish victory
Territorial changes	Christianspris is captured by Swedish forces

Belligerents
(yes) Swedish Empire	Denmark–Norway

Commanders and leaders
(yes) Lennart Torstensson	Axel Urup (POW)

Units involved
(yes) Two regiments	Christianspris garrison

Strength
Unknown, but more than the Danes	50–60 men

Casualties and losses
Unknown	Everyone but one killed

The storming of Christianspris occurred on 18 and 19 December 1643 during the Torstenson War between Denmark and Sweden.

After Sweden went to war with Denmark in 1643, a Swedish army under the command of Lennart Torstensson invaded Jutland, quickly capturing multiple towns before moving toward the fortress of Christianspris, which had a garrison of 50 to 60 men led by Axel Urup.

After a failed storming on 18 December, the Swedes attacked once more on 19 December in a two-pronged attack. One regiment went overland toward the fortress's ramparts while another regiment crossed toward the fortress using confiscated boats. The Swedes managed to overwhelm the outnumbered Danish garrison, killing all of them except Urup, who was made a prisoner of war.

== Background ==
Frustrated by perceived Danish disruptions of Swedish activities in the Thirty Years' War, Axel Oxenstierna, the chancellor of Sweden, began planning a preemptive war with Denmark in May 1643. According to his plan, a Swedish army under the command of Lennart Torstensson was to invade Jutland from Germany, and then be transported to the Danish islands. Another army under the command of Gustav Horn would invade Scania.

=== Prelude ===
After being ordered to attack Denmark in October 1643, Torstensson prepared defenses on the borders of Bohemia and Moravia before marching northwest. He led about 15,000 or 16,000 men in total, 12,000 of whom were national troops. Only after arriving at Havelberg on 6 December were Torstensson's officers informed of the attack on Denmark.

The Swedish army assembled at Ratzeburg on 11 December and invaded Holstein on 13 December. They captured Segelburg, Itzehoe, Kiel, and Breitenburg, and then moved toward Christianspris.

== Storming ==
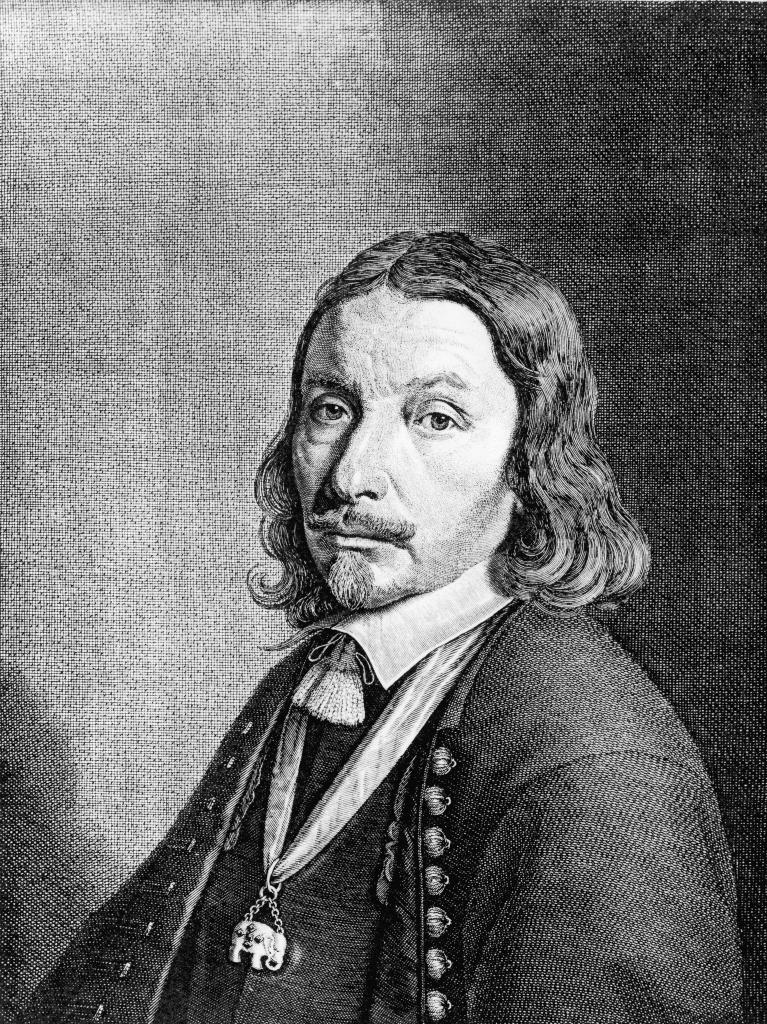
Portrait of Axel Urup by Albert Haelwegh from the 1660s

Christianspris, a bastion fort around a mile north of Kiel, had a garrison of between 50 to 60 men under the command of Axel Urup. Additionally, the fortress was well maintained, difficult to reach, and equipped with artillery. On 16 December, Conrad Mardefelt, the quartermaster general was sent to the fortress to negotiate its surrender. However, all demands to surrender were refused by the Danes. Nevertheless, Mardefelt had a good view of the Danish defenses and drew up a plan for the ensuing siege. On 17 December, the Swedes began bombarding Christianspris from Kiel.

Unwilling to wait, Torstensson stormed Christianspris on 18 December. However, the attack was repelled. On 19 December, the Swedes attacked once again with two regiments. One force marched overland against the fortress's ramparts, while another crossed over to Christianspris in confiscated boats that had been armed with guns. The Swedes surprised the Danish defenders, swarming towards the fortress in the dark. The Danish defenses on the sandbank consisted only of palisades and chevaux-de-frise.

The Danish defenders were quickly overwhelmed by the larger Swedish force, and were all killed except Urup, who was captured.

== Aftermath ==
After capturing the fortress, the Swedes took money, materiel, and artillery. Additionally, they renamed the fortress as Kristinapris, after Christina, Queen of Sweden.

As rumors of the storming spread, the fortress of Rendsburg capitulated to the Swedes without a fight. Other towns also surrendered. By the end of the year, the entirety of Holstein, excluding Glückstadt and Krempe, was under Swedish occupation.

== See also ==
- Siege of Laholm Castle – Part of the Torstenson War
- Siege of Hammershus – Part of the Torstenson War
