= Battle of Rinnebäck Ravine =

Part of the Torstenson War

- Part of the Torstenson War
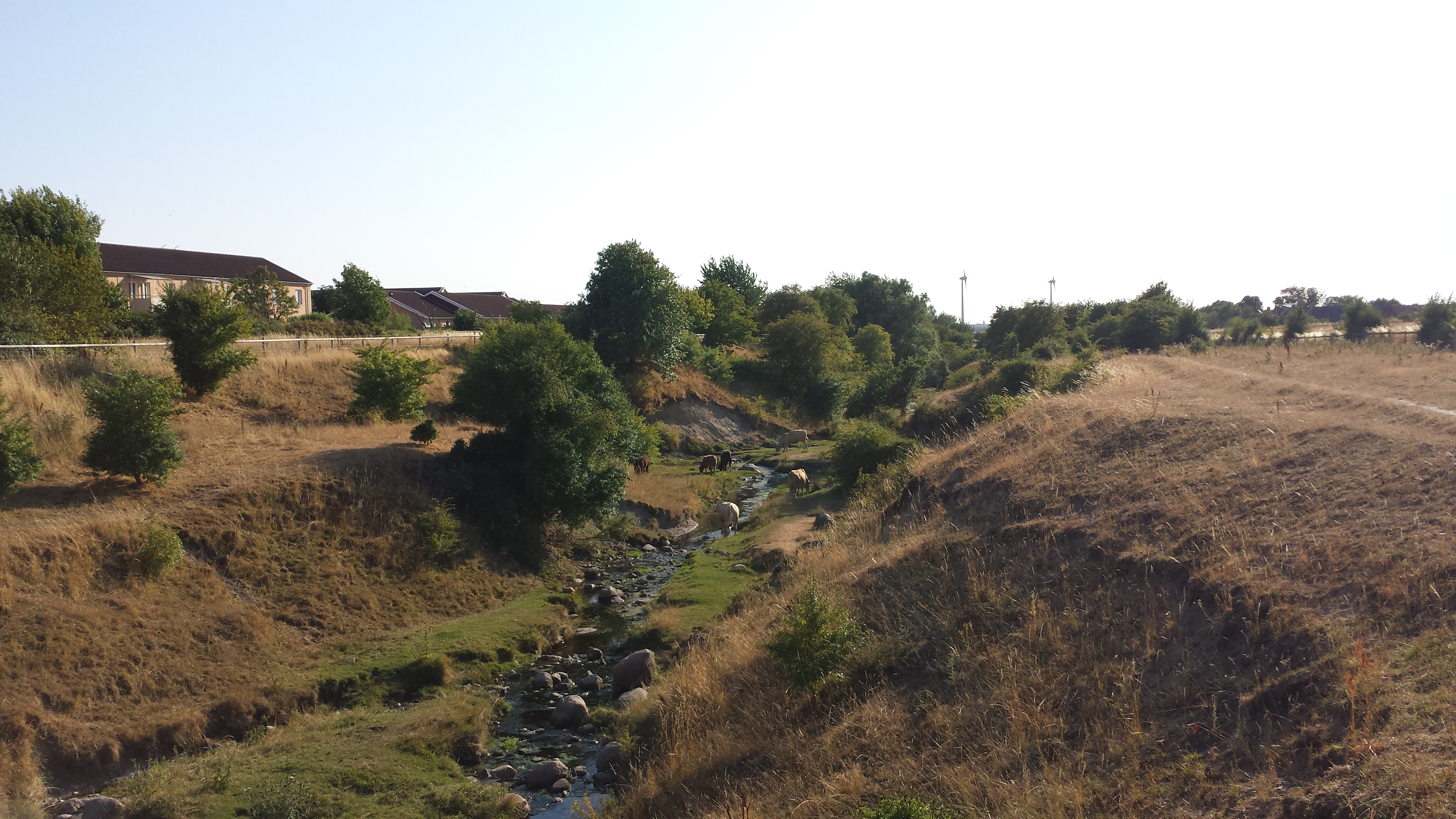
- Photo of Rinnebäck Ravine taken in 2018
| Date | 17 October 1644 |
| Location | Rinnebäck Ravine, Värpinge, Scania 55°42′24″N 13°09′09″E |
| Result | Swedish victory |

Belligerents
| (yes) Swedish Empire | Denmark–Norway |

Commanders and leaders
| (yes) Gustav Horn | Christian IV; Hindrich Anefeld; Johan de Wahl |

Units involved
| (yes) One cavalry detachment | At least three cavalry squadrons German mercenary regiment |

Strength
| Several hundred infantry Unknown amount of cavalry | 2,000 German infantry (Note: In the rear guard); Unknown amount of cavalry 24 guns |

Casualties and losses
| Unknown | 400 killed or drowned Many captured |

The battle of Rinnebäck Ravine occurred on 17 October 1644 during the Torstenson War, when a Swedish force under the command of Gustav Horn defeated a Danish force under Christian IV while the Danish force was crossing Rinnebäck Ravine in Scania.

The Torstenson War broke out between Denmark and Sweden in 1643, and a Swedish army under Gustav Horn invaded Scania. He began besieging Malmö in June 1644, but his position became difficult in September, and he withdrew to Uppåkra. He was followed by the Danish King, Christian IV, who established a position at Alrup.

On 17 October, the Danish army broke camp, moving toward Lund. It was pursued by Horn, and while the Danish army was crossing Rinnebäck Ravine, Horn attacked the Danish rearguard. The rearguard fell into disarray, and 400 Danes were killed or drowned. A German mercenary regiment of 2,000 men defended itself behind earthworks.

== Background ==
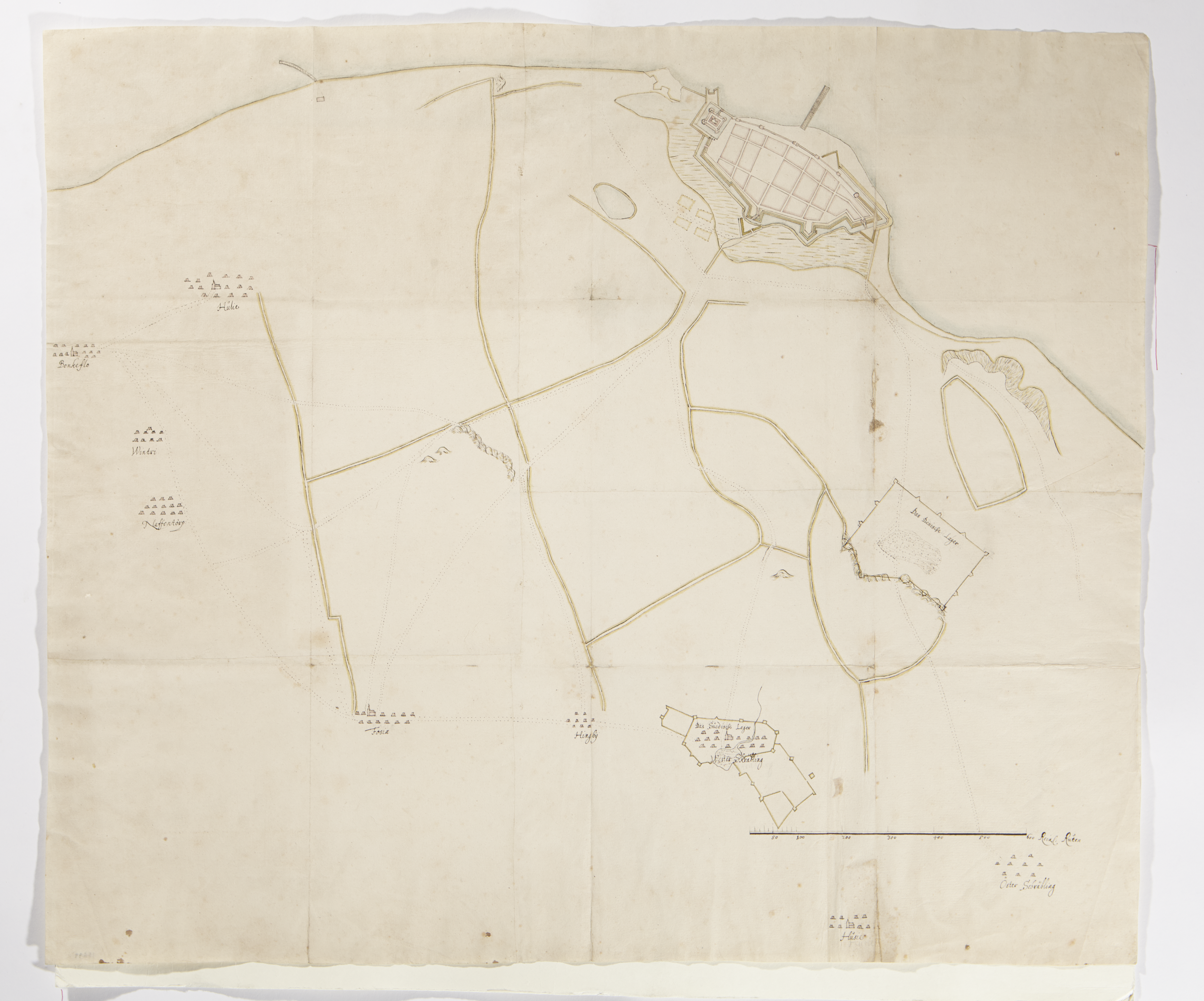
Map of Malmö and its surroundings from 1644

In 1643, the Torstenson War broke out between Denmark and Sweden, fueled by Swedish frustrations over Danish actions during the Thirty Years' War. Gustav Horn led the invasion of Scania, beginning on 14 February 1644. He began besieging Malmö in June 1644, establishing a position at Skräflinge.

By September, his position outside Malmö had become difficult from sickness, and on 27 September, he set fire to his camp and withdrew in battle formation to Uppåkra. King Christian IV followed him, refraining from attacking the Swedes, and only some skirmishes took place. Christian IV established a position at Alrup across from Uppåkra, close to the Øresund. The two armies remained largely inactive, except for two occasions. On 11 and 12 October, Danish troops under Rantzau and Nils Wind respectively attacked the Swedish camp, but were repelled both times.

== Battle ==
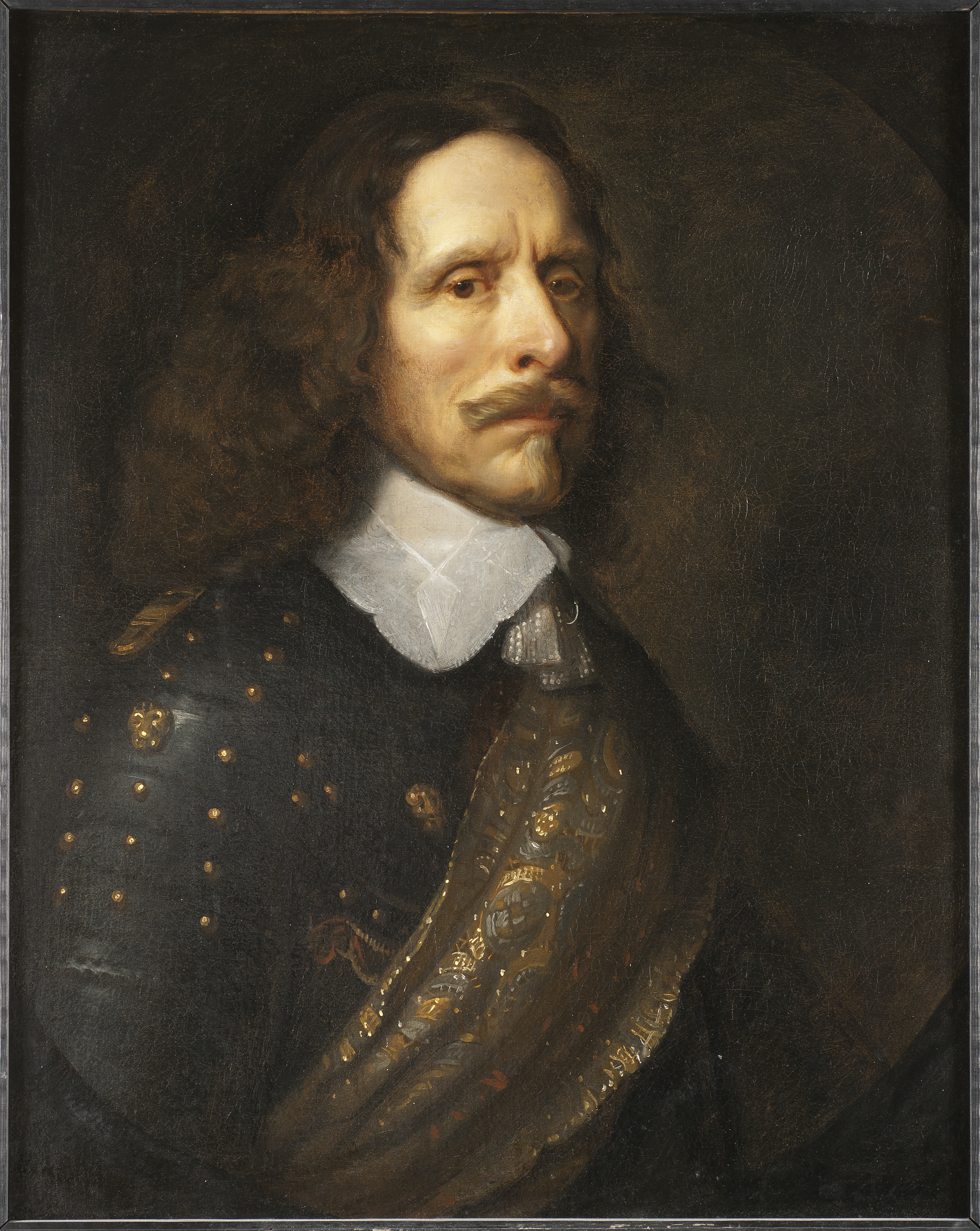
Painting of Gustav Horn by David Beck

On 17 October, Christian IV broke camp and withdrew to Rinnebäck Ravine in an attempt to cover his advance toward Lund, most likely to cut off Horn's connection with Landskrona. The Danes initially did not know whether Horn would remain at Uppåkra or cross the river, but when Christian began crossing the ravine, Horn pursued him with a detachment of cavalry and a several hundred infantry.

By the time Horn arrived, Christian had already crossed with the vanguard, most of the infantry, and the artillery. The Danish artillery, 24 guns in total, had been turned toward the Swedes to defend the Danish forces yet to cross the ravine.

Horn attacked the Danish rearguard, consisting of three cavalry squadrons commanded by Lieutenant Colonel Hindrich Anefeld and Johan de Wahl. The Danish cavalry fell into disarray, with some being driven into the river, where approximately 400 were killed or drowned. The Swedes also captured three officers and two standards. A 2,000-man German mercenary regiment took position behind earthworks and stone fences near the ravine, protecting themselves from the Swedish cavalry.

== Aftermath ==
Of the two standards captured by the Swedes, one bore the Three Crowns, which Horn called "a good omen", as the Swedish regiment responsible for taking it also bore the Three Crowns. On the night of 17 October, Horn took a separate route towards Landskrona, as Danish forces stood between him and the bridge at Kävlinge. On 18 October, he broke camp and crossed the Höje River, marching toward Landskrona. On 16 November, when news of the battle reached Hamburg, the Danish casualties were exaggerated to 2,000 killed.

== See also ==
- Siege of Landskrona Citadel – Part of the Torstenson War
- Siege of Laholm Castle – Part of the Torstenson War
