= Siege of Hammershus =

Part of the Torstenson War

- Part of the Torstenson War
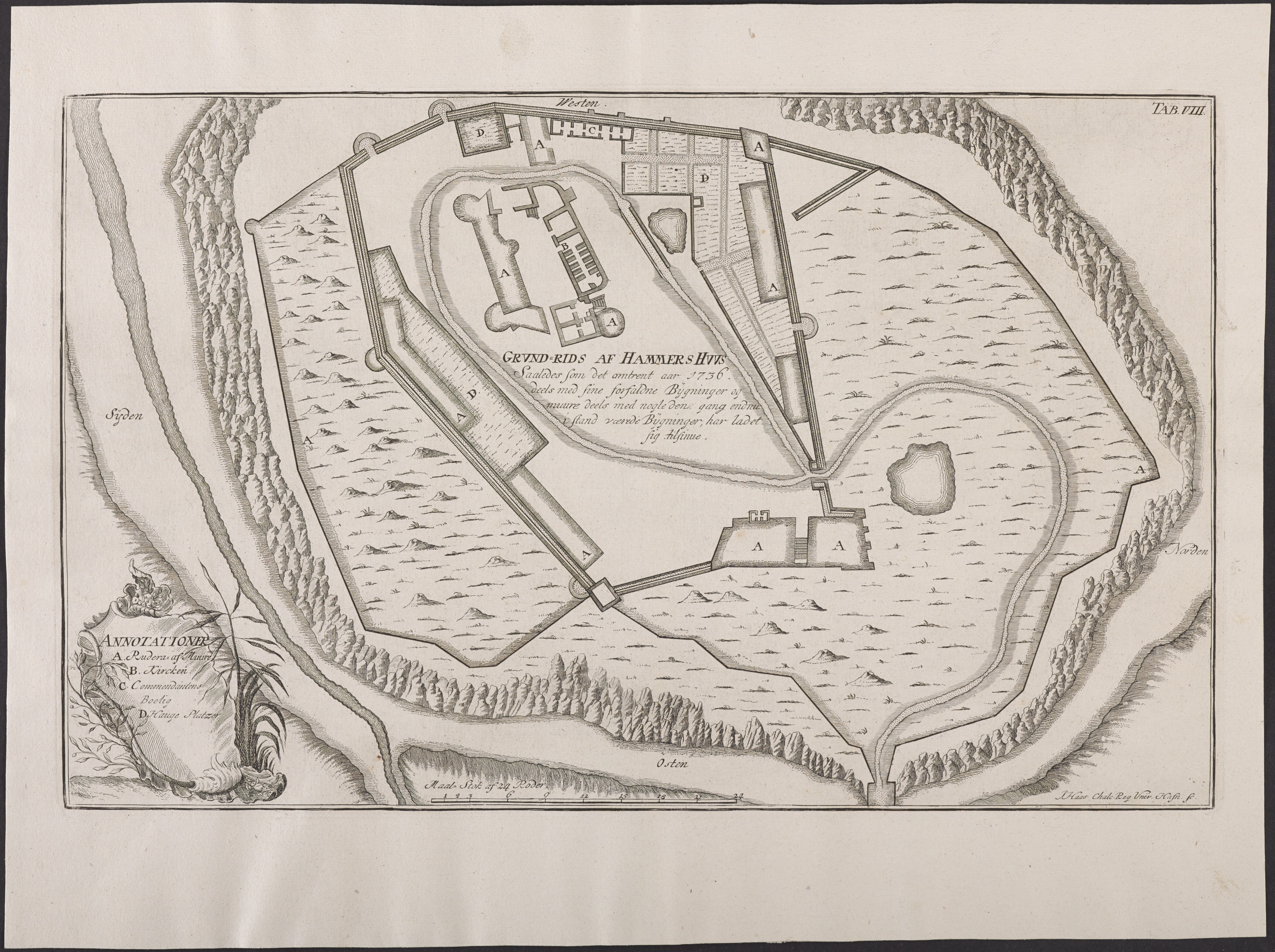
- Plan of Hammershus as it appeared in c.1736 by Jonas Haas
Date	16–17 June 1645
Location	Hammershus, Bornholm 55°16′15″N 14°45′18″E
Result	Swedish victory
Territorial changes	Hammershus is captured by Swedish forces

Belligerents
(yes) Swedish Empire	Denmark–Norway

Commanders and leaders
(yes) Carl Gustaf Wrangel	Holger Rosencrantz

Units involved
Unknown	Hammershus garrison

Strength
900 men 4 guns	8–9 men At least 3 guns

Casualties and losses
Unknown	1 wounded

The siege of Hammershus occurred from 16 to 17 June 1645 during the Torstenson War between Sweden and Denmark–Norway.

On 8 June, a Swedish force of 900 men under Carl Gustaf Wrangel landed at Nexø, where they repelled the Danish defenders. While some of the defenders surrendered, many fled to Hammershus under Holger Rosencrantz. After learning that the Danish fleet had returned to Copenhagen, Wrangel decided to proceed with the previously postponed capture of Hammershus.

On 16 June, the Swedes landed at Sandvig and immediately established a redoubt on Nøddebo Hill. Despite initial resistance from the small Danish garrison of 8–9 men, Rosencrantz ultimately capitulated in exchange for safe passage.

== Background ==
In 1643, the Torstenson War broke out between Denmark and Sweden. Sweden invaded Jutland and Scania at once, with Lennart Torstensson leading the campaign in Jutland and Gustav Horn in Scania.

=== Situation on Bornholm ===
When the war broke out, Holger Rosencrantz was the commander of Bornholm. Previous requests to reinforce the island had gone unanswered by the Danish government. The island's fortress, Hammershus, was also in terrible condition. The island had several redoubts and artillery batteries along its shore, as well as a militia. The exact number of men the militia could muster is difficult to estimate. According to M.K. Zahrtmann, the militia consisted of 3,000 men, 2,400 of whom were capable of combat.

Rosencrantz ordered that the shore be guarded day and night, and it was agreed that each parish on the island would send mounted peasants in the event of an emergency.

=== Prelude ===
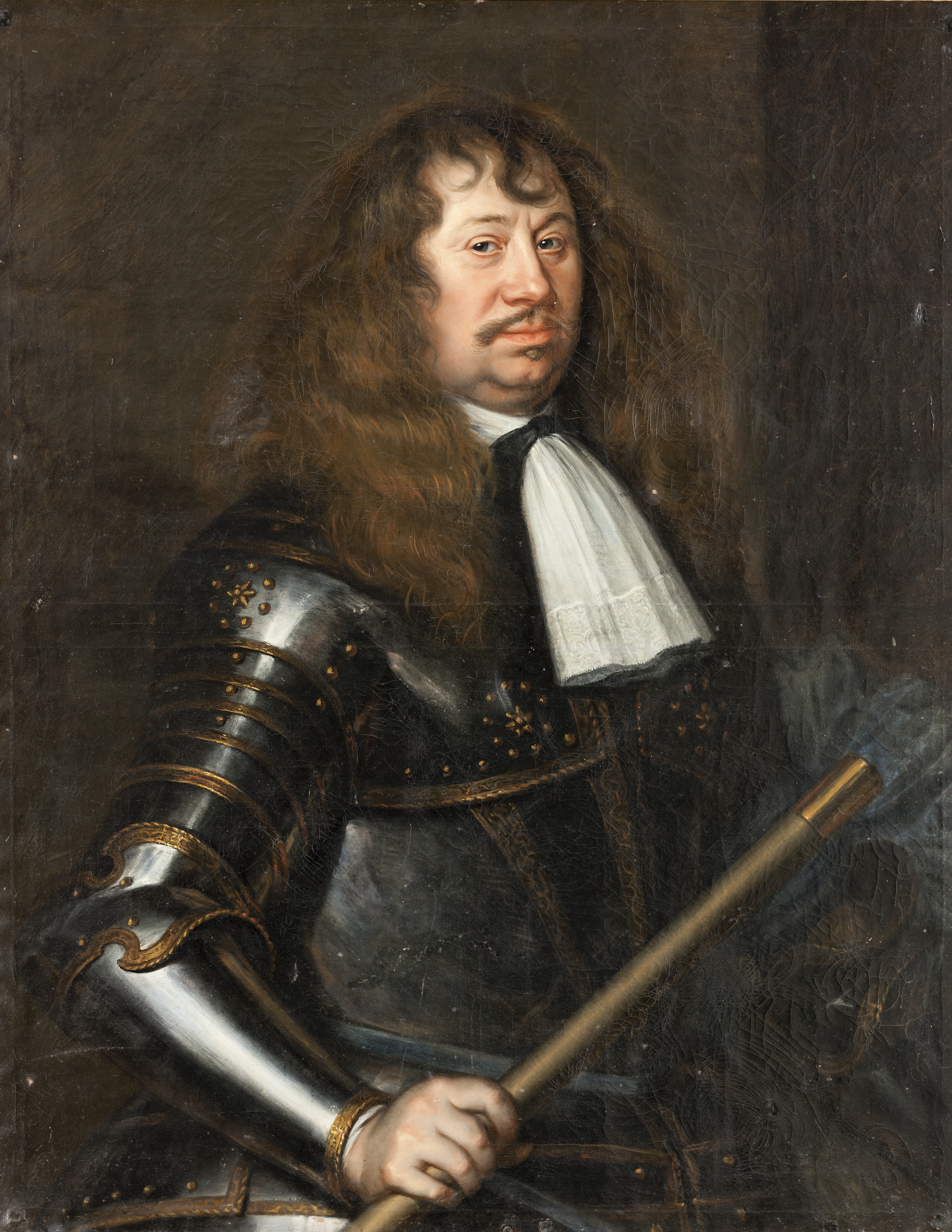
Portrait of Wrangel from 1662 by Matthäus Merian

On 25 May, orders from Stockholm for Carl Gustaf Wrangel to depart from Wismar arrived on board the ships Apollo and Enhorn, which also carried 300 sailors. In total, Wrangel had 19 ships, along with one fireship and a few smaller vessels. On 31 May, he departed from Wismar, setting course for Dornbusch, where he planned to rendezvous with Erik Ryning. Outside Darsserort on 1 June, two ships from Ryning's fleet, Rekompens and Västervik, notified him that Ryning would soon arrive at Dornbusch.

Accordingly, Wrangel waited off the shore of Rügen for the first week of June, awaiting Ryning's arrival. However, he soon learned of a failed Danish expedition to Gothenburg and that the Danish fleet had returned to Copenhagen. As the Danish fleet was no longer a threat, and not having heard anything from Ryning, Wrangel decided to conquer Bornholm.

==== Landing on Bornholm ====
On 8 June, Wrangel departed from Jasmund, arriving off Nexø in the evening with his fleet, now some 29 ships strong and carrying 900 men. The Danes had established artillery batteries near the shore, though these failed to hold the Swedes back as they landed on 9 June. Immediately after landing, Wrangel issued a proclamation to the island's inhabitants, promising protection to those who did not take up arms, although they were still forced to pay a contribution to the Swedes. Some surrendered, while others fled to Hammershus. The Swedes also plundered the countryside.

== Siege ==
Fearing an encounter with the Danish fleet, Wrangel postponed any attacks on Hammershus. Instead, he prepared for a siege, receiving two mortars and possibly other guns from Gustav Horn, with whom he had established contact upon arriving off Nexø. Wrangel sent ships toward Øresund, so he would be warned in case the Danish fleet appeared. On 11 June, the Swedes were told by a Dutch merchant fleet that the Danish fleet was sailing between Møn and Rügen.

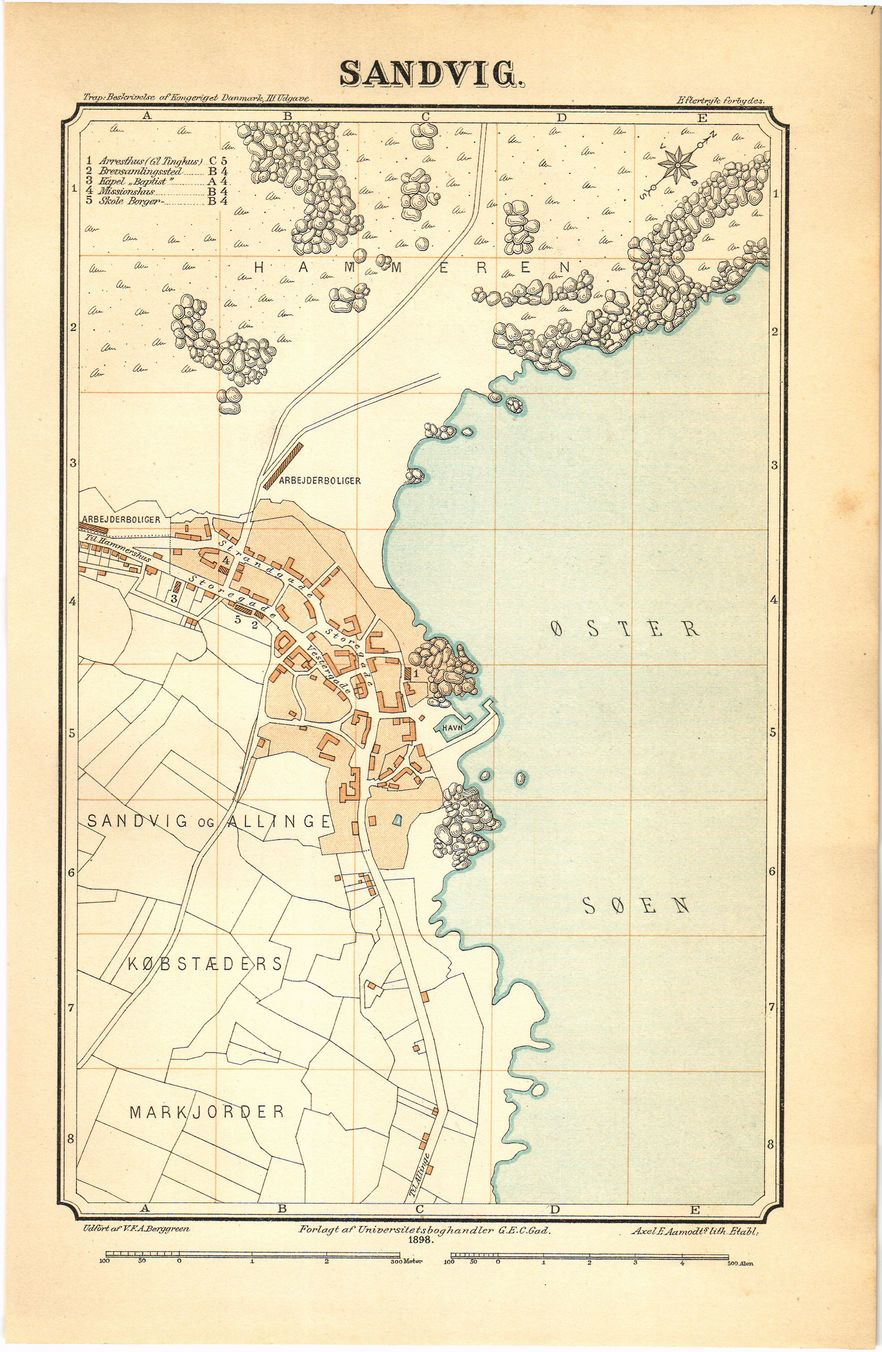
Map of Sandvig from 1898 by V.F.A. Berggreen

A few days later, the Swedes were notified by a Dutch galiot that the Danish fleet had returned to Copenhagen. Thus, Wrangel no longer feared an encounter with it and decided to sail to Sandvig in northern Bornholm and disembark his troops for a bombardment of Hammershus. The size of the Hammershus garrison was originally 60 men, but it was reduced to 8 to 9 men after most of them defected after collecting their pay. Additionally, the castle had three eight-pounder guns and some smaller pieces.

On the evening of 16 June, the Swedes landed, and during nighttime they set up two twelve-pounder guns near the castle. The two guns were situated in a redoubt at Nøddebo Hill, some 500 meters from Hammershus. The Swedes began bombarding Hammershus from both land and sea. Initially, Rosencrantz offered resistance, during which a master gunner was wounded in the thigh, and Rosencrantz's own servants manned the cannons. However, Holger Rosencrantz surrendered on 17 June in exchange for free departure for the garrison, their families, and their property.

== Aftermath ==
From the castle, the Swedes seized 39 guns, four or five of them dated to Erik XIV's reign (1560–1568). These guns were transferred aboard the Swedish ships. The Swedes had suffered 3 killed and 7 wounded during the conquest of Bornholm.

After the island was conquered, Wrangel secured an oath of allegiance from the people of Bornholm on 22 June at Hammershus. He also appointed John Burdon as both commandant of the fortress and governor of the island. To garrison the fortress, Gustav Horn sent 50 men and a captain, and the fleet contributed a similar number of men.

== See also ==
- Siege of Laholm Castle – Part of the Torstenson War
- Battle of Rinnebäck Ravine – Part of the Torstenson War
