= Axel Urup =

Danish military engineer and commander

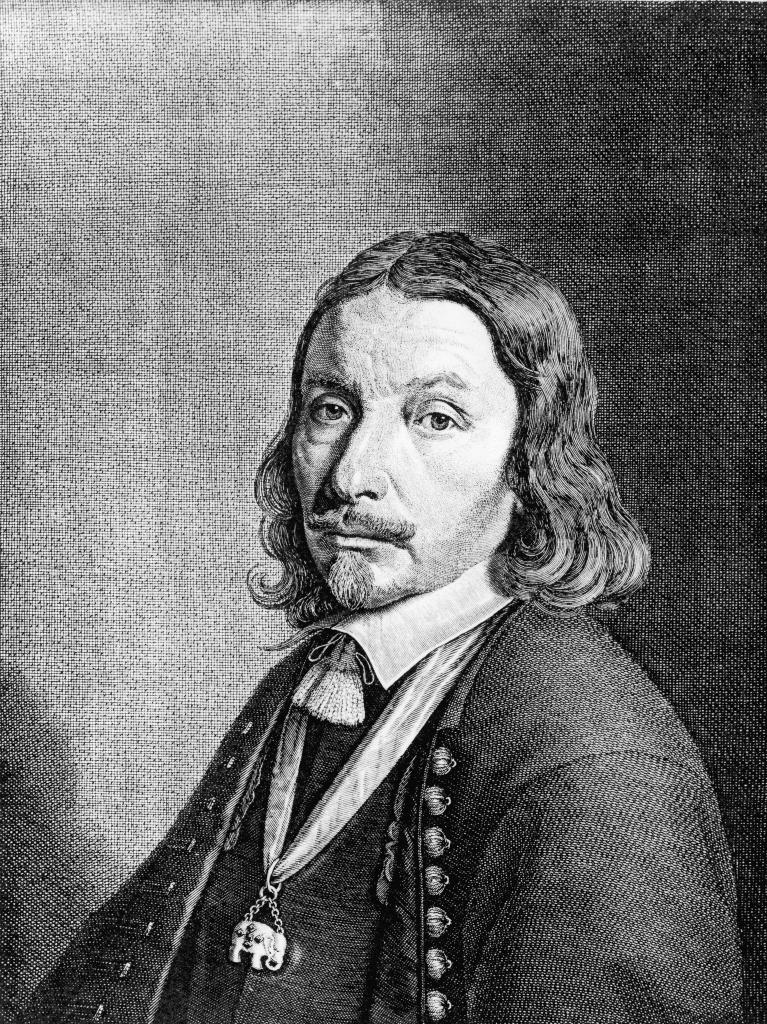
- Axel Urup

Danish rigsråd
- In office 1658–1660
- Monarch: Frederick III
- Preceded by: Anders Bille
- Succeeded by: Johan Christoffer von Kørbitz

Personal details
- Born: September 13, 1601 Denmark
- Died: March 15, 1671 (aged 69) Copenhagen, Denmark
- Profession: Military officer, justice
- Awards: Knight of the Elephant (1648)

Axel Urup (13 September 1601 – 15 March 1671) was a Danish military engineer and commander, Rigsråd and Supreme Court justice.

== Biography ==
In 1621 he travelled abroad and served in the Dutch defence of Bergen op Zoom. Later he continued to England, France and Italy before returning home where he served as an ensign under Enevold Kruse in the Danish branch of the Thirty Years' War in 1625 and 1626. He was taken as a prisoner of war by Tilly at Battle of Lutter on 27 August 1626 but was part of an exchange of prisoners on 10 December.

In 1627 he was engaged as a military engineer but returned to the Netherlands in 1629 where he from 1 October participated in the Siege of 's-Hertogenbosch and was promoted to lieutenant colonel in Holger Parsberg's Danish regiment.

In 1630 he was charged with the fortification of various strategic localities in Jutland. In 1631 he founded the fortress of Christianspris just north of Kiel and was in 1635 granted it as a fief with title of Governor and Engineer of the Realm. On 7 April 1638 he was promoted to colonel and ordered to establish a regiment of German soldiers. In December 1643, at the outbreak of the Torstenson War, he was taken prisoner when Lennart Torstenson captured Christianspris but later set free at Lübeck. From 1645 and until the fortress was abandoned in 1648, he served once again as governor of Christianspris. In 1647 he was in Copenhagen where he worked on the fortifications and completed the rebuilding of Christian IV's Arsenal.

On 25 November 1648 he was created Knight of the Order of the Elephant and granted Christianopel as a fief and in 1651 also the Fief of Copenhagen.

1653 he became commander of an infantry regiment on Zealand. During the plague of 1654 he remained in Copenhagen and governed the city in the absence of Joachim Gersdorff.

On 3 August 1655 he became a member of the Privy Council and that same year received large fiefs in return for the Fief of Copenhagen. He accompanied Crown Prince Christian to Hyldingen in Norway.

On 22 January 1657 he became commander of the Danish army in Scania during the Scanian War (Oberst og Chef for skaanske Reg. Sogneryttere.

On 12 April 1657 he was granted the Fief of Malmø, 25 maj Generalissimus of the Danish troops in Scania. In 1658 he succeeded Anders Bille as Rigsmarsk.

On 13 January he became a member of the new War Council and participated in the defence of the Copenhagen during the siege and was at the king's side during the Assault on Copenhagen on 11 February 1659. The following year he took part in the negotiations which led to the Treaty of Copenhagen. From 1661 to 1670 he was a justice in the new Supreme Court.

In 1659 and 1550 respectively, he was granted Dalum Abbey (until 1662) and St. Canute's Abbey, both on the island of Funen.

== See also ==
- Danish nobility

== Works cited ==
- Englund, Peter (1993). Ofredsår: om den Svenska Stormaktstiden och en man i dess mitt [Years of unrest: about the Swedish Empire and a man in its midst] (in Swedish). Stockholm: Atlantis. ISBN 9789174863499.
