= Vang, Bornholm =

Vang
- Village
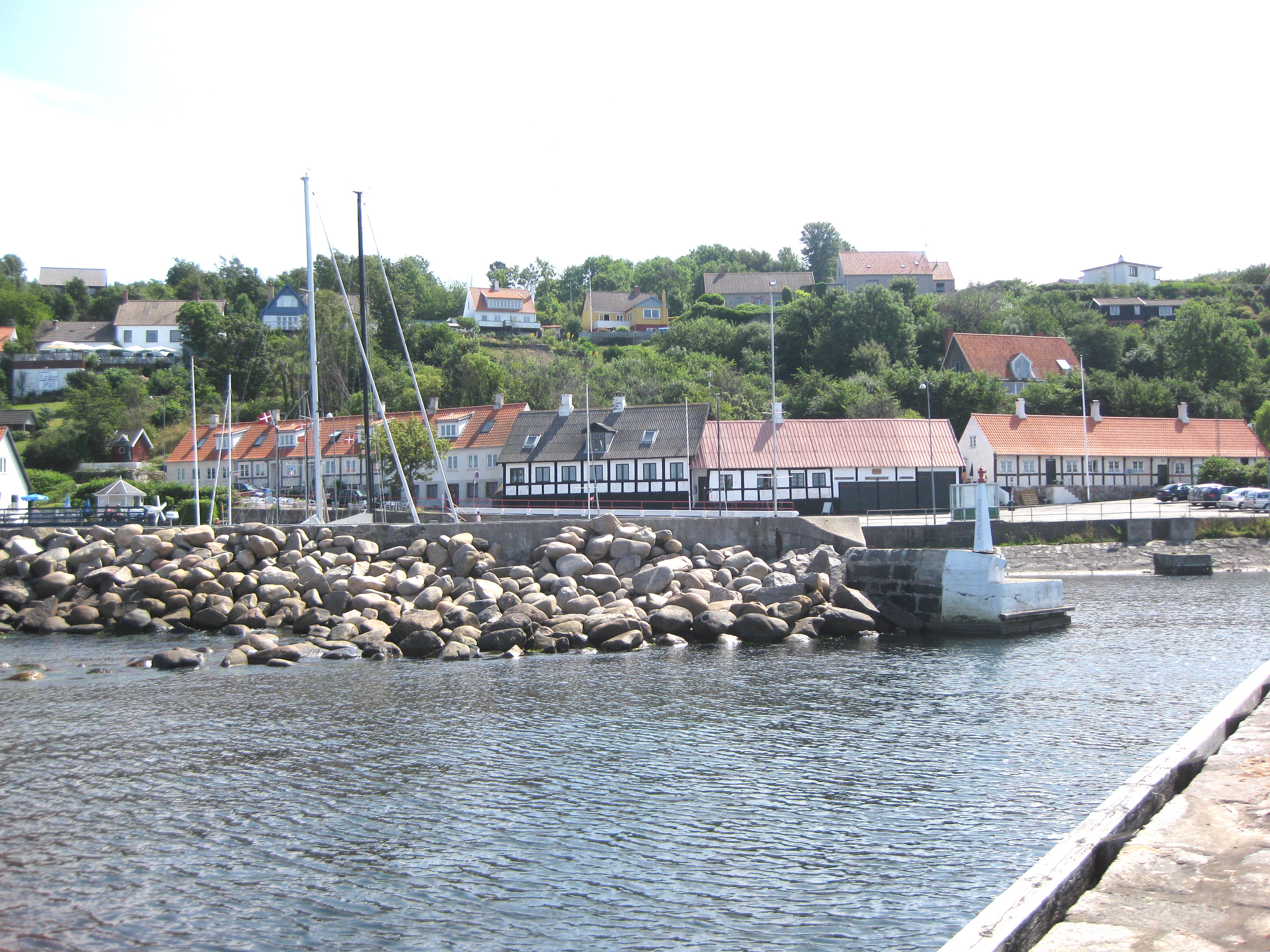
- Vang Harbour, Bornholm

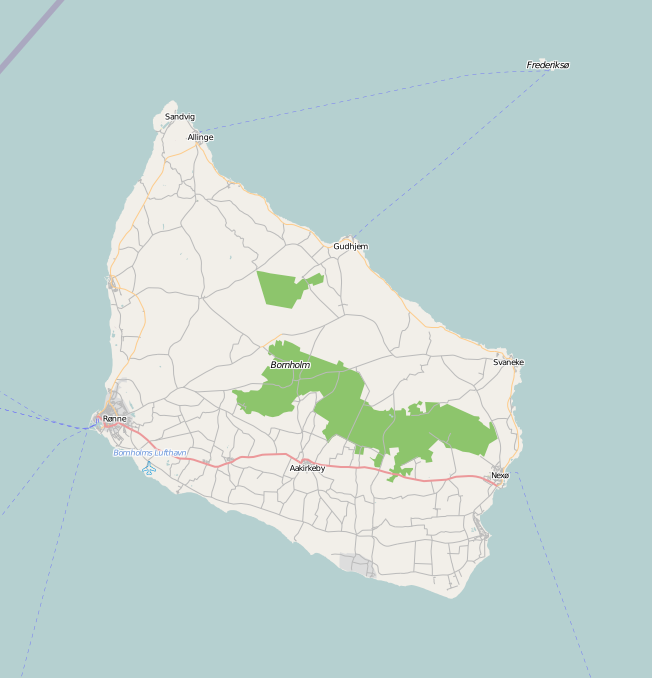
- Location on Bornholm
- Coordinates: 55°14′48″N 14°44′23″E
- Country: Denmark
- Region: Capital (Hovedstaden)
- Municipality: Bornholm

Population (2009)
  - Total: 92
- Time zone: UTC+1 (CET)
  - Summer (DST): UTC+2 (CEST)

Vang is a little fishing village on the northwest coast of the Danish island of Bornholm, 7 kilometres (4.3 mi) north of Hasle. From the late 19th century, it prospered as a result of its granite-quarrying activities. As of 2009, the locality has 92 inhabitants, 17 more than in 2004.

== History ==
The first historical reference to Vang is from 1570 but there is evidence of a settlement there in the Iron Age and the Viking period. Hammers Map from 1750 shows about half a dozen houses with small gardens around Vang harbour. A description of the area written by U. Salchow in 1814 mentions the extremely steep hill down to the harbour where there were seven houses and nine fishing boats. The existence of watermills and at least one windmill at the time is also documented.

Fishing dates back to the community's beginnings when fishing boats were apparently pulled up on the shore next to the earliest cottages. It was only in 1870 that the fishing harbour was developed as a result of Vang's place as one of the island's main fishing ports.

== Landmarks ==
Granite quarry

Vang granite is considered to be of particularly high quality. The quarry just south of the village appears to have its origins in a small enterprise run by Jacob Mogensen from Nylars who first produced gravestones before opening a stone masonry in Rønne employing a workforce of 50. In 1896, Mogensen bought some 2 hectares (4.9 acres) of land behind Hullegård in Rutsker which he developed into a quarry. By 1905, Mogensen had opened a track into an area known as Klondyke, just south of Vang and north of Blåskinsdalen as he believed the stone there was of a better quality. At the time, his stone masonry was supplying Copenhagen for building the city hall and related structures. By the 1930s, some 200 were working in the quarry, encouraging the development of housing in Vang. The harbour was enlarged on several occasions, the southwestern pier being constructed in 1944. In 1965, ship loading facilities were constructed south of Vang's harbour which could again serve fishing boats and pleasure craft.

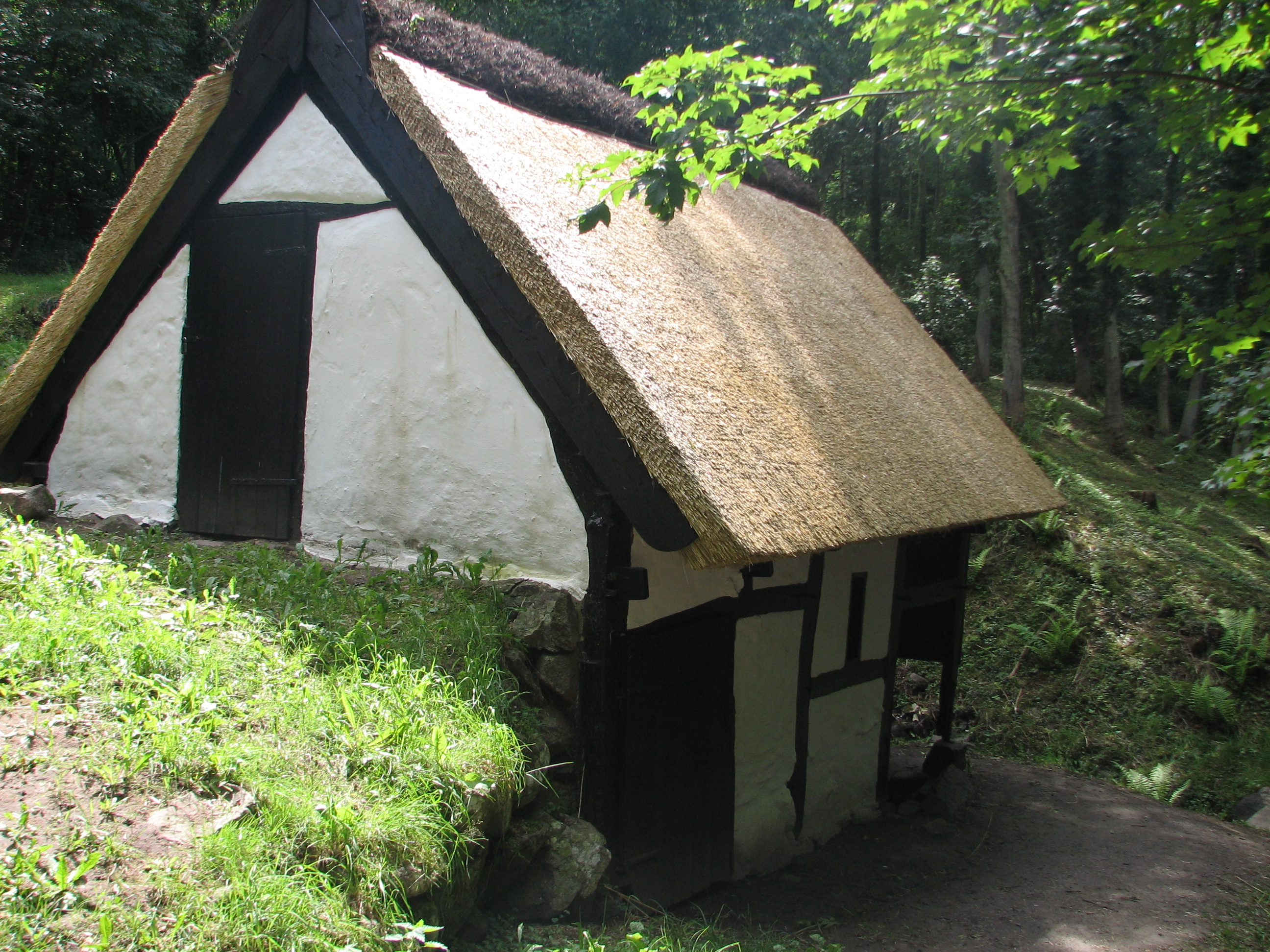
Vang Watermill

Watermill

On the stream known as Ringebækken, there is a restored watermill, Vang Vandmølle, the only listed watermill on the island. Built by Bornholmer Poul Hansen in 1811, it appears to have been in use until the very beginning of the 20th century when it was abandoned in favour of the Dutch windmill, Bymøllen, constructed in 1874 (now demolished).

Harbor

Two breakwaters form the harbor, which can handle vessels up to 10 metres (33 ft). Approximately 0.3 miles (0.48 km) to the southwest, there is a 150 metres (490 ft) long pier which is used by vessels for granite-loading. The pier berths have depths that range from 5.6–7.5 metres (18–25 ft).

== Tourism ==
The village is also popular with tourists, commanding fine views of Hammershus to the north and Ringbakkerne to the south. The harbour is open to pleasure craft. There are also well-signposted walks in the area.
