= Hammershus =

Ruins off Bornholm

Coordinates: 55°16′15″N 14°45′18″E

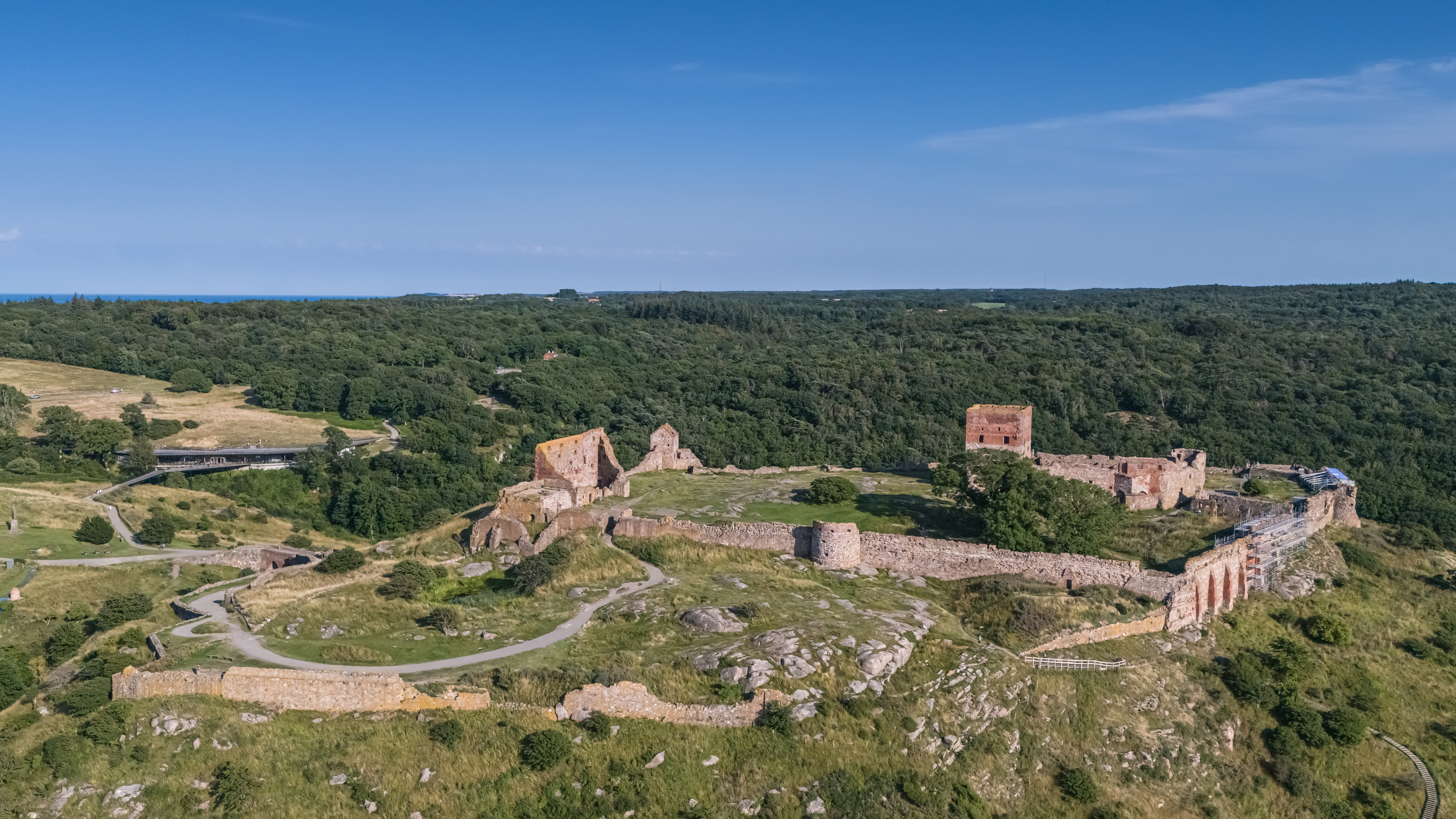
Hammershus

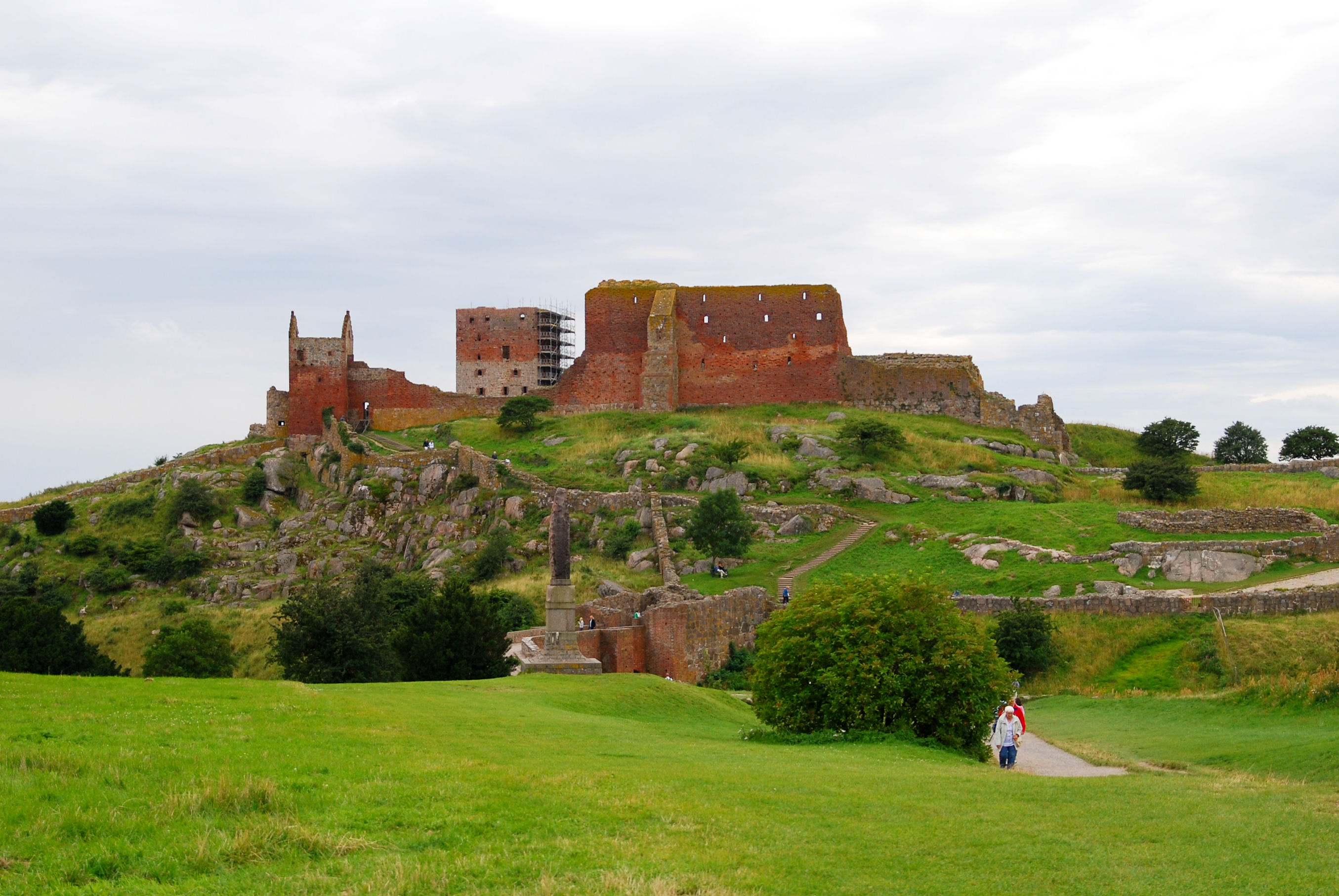
Hammershus

Hammershus is a medieval era fortification at Hammeren on the northern tip of the Danish island of Bornholm. The fortress was partially demolished around 1750 and is now a ruin. It was partially restored around 1900.

== History ==
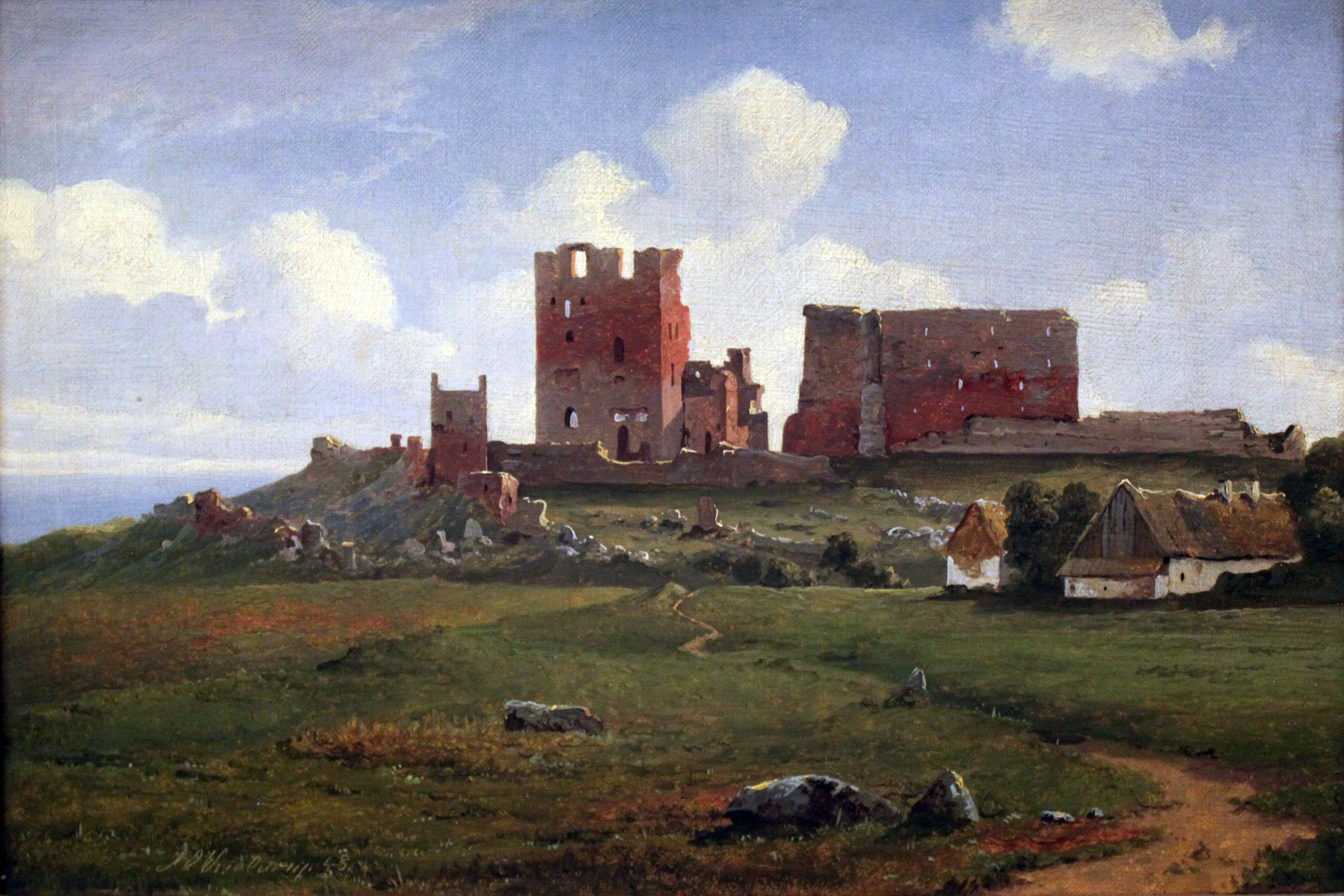
Ruins of Hammershus Anton Eduard Kieldrup (1848)

Hammershus was Scandinavia's largest medieval fortification and is one of the larger medieval fortifications of Northern Europe. It is situated in the Baltic Sea 74 metres (243 ft) above sea level. The fortification was erected in the 13th century and consists of the base castle residence and features a grand tower called the "mantel" tower. Hammershus Fortress features a 750-metre-long (2,460 ft) perimeter wall around the castle grounds.

Initially built by the local distinct Islanders for their own determination of purposes and was later the site of many wars. During a number of successive struggles between the kings of Denmark versus the Archbishopric, the fortress was invaded and used to be a refuge for the Archbishops including Bishop Jens Grand. It was later conquered by the king's army on a number of occasions, e.g. 1259, 1265, 1319, and 1325. In 1521, it was taken by king Christian II, who used it to imprison Bishop Jens Andersen Beldenak of Funen. The fortress was conquered by forces of Lübeck the same year. In June 1645 during the Torstenson War, Swedish forces led by Carl Gustaf Wrangel captured the fortress.

In 1658, Hammershus was occupied by Swedish forces, but a rebellion on the island terminated the Swedish rule. The rebels, led by Jens Pedersen Kofoed, shot the Swedish commandant Johan Printzenskiöld, and the Danish peasants traveled to Copenhagen to return the island to the king of Denmark.

Corfitz Ulfeldt and his wife Leonora Christina were imprisoned in Hammershus 1660–1661.

Johann Conrad Dippel the German Pietist theologian, physician, alchemist and occultist was held imprisoned there from 1719 to 1724 at Hammershus.

In 1743 Hammershus was abandoned as a stronghold. The remains were preserved in 1822. Since the major excavation and restoration work in the late 1800s, there has been a continuous maintenance of the ruins.

== Description ==
Visitors to Hammershus have views of the coastline and the sea surrounding Bornholm. South of the castle is a deep valley, water filled hollows, and dense forest. There are a number points before arriving at castle where enemies could be stopped. The castle was built with box-like rooms surrounded by rings of fortifications. Each provided an additional layer of protection from invaders. Two natural spring ponds provided fresh drinking water on the side of the castle.

== Art ==
Because of the unusual light on Bornholm, and because it has only four hours of darkness in summer, many of Denmark's earliest artists chose to paint views of Hammershus. One of the most notable is by Anton Eduard Kieldrup from 1848, which is on display at the Bornholm Art Museum.

== Gallery ==
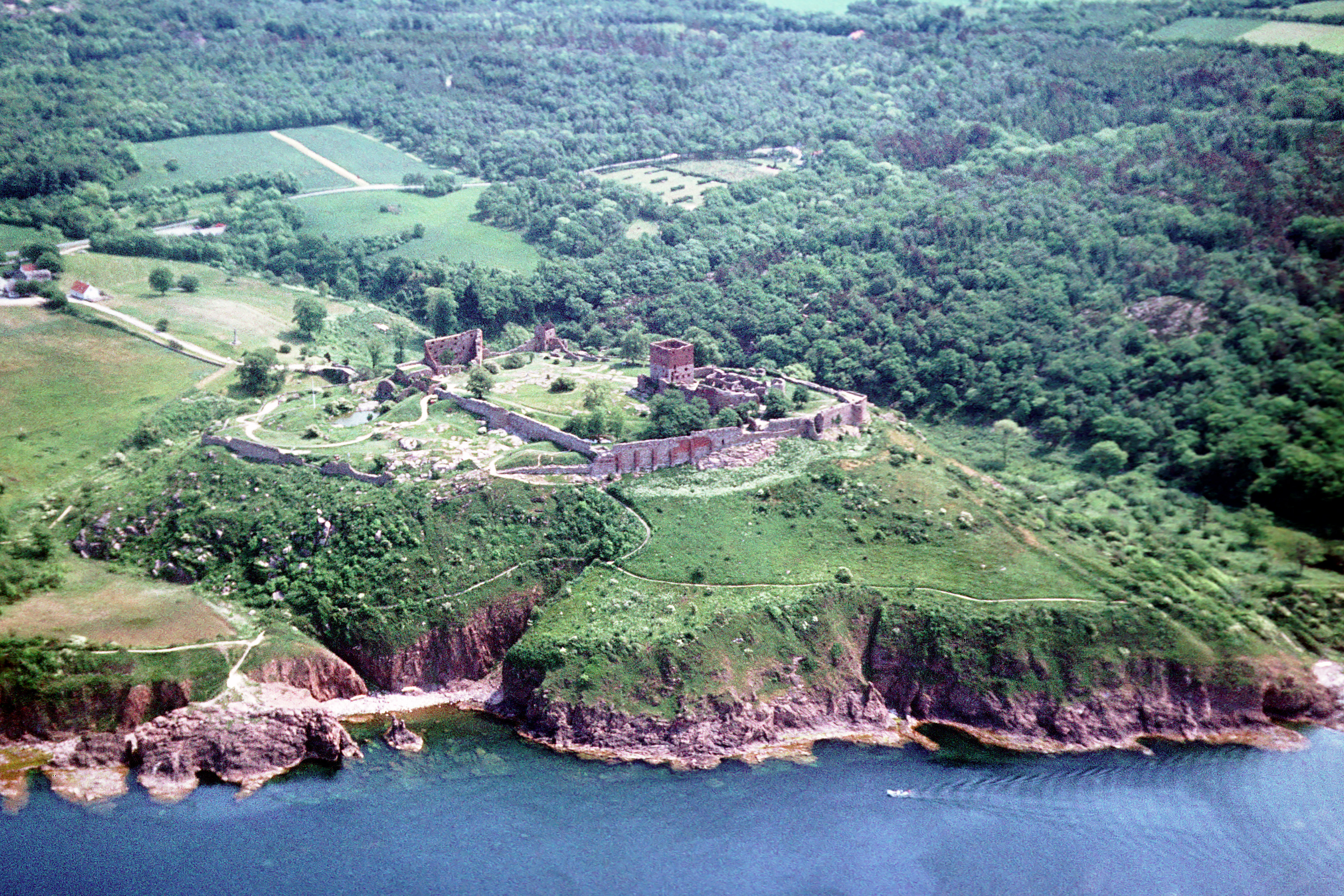
Hammershus (aerial view)

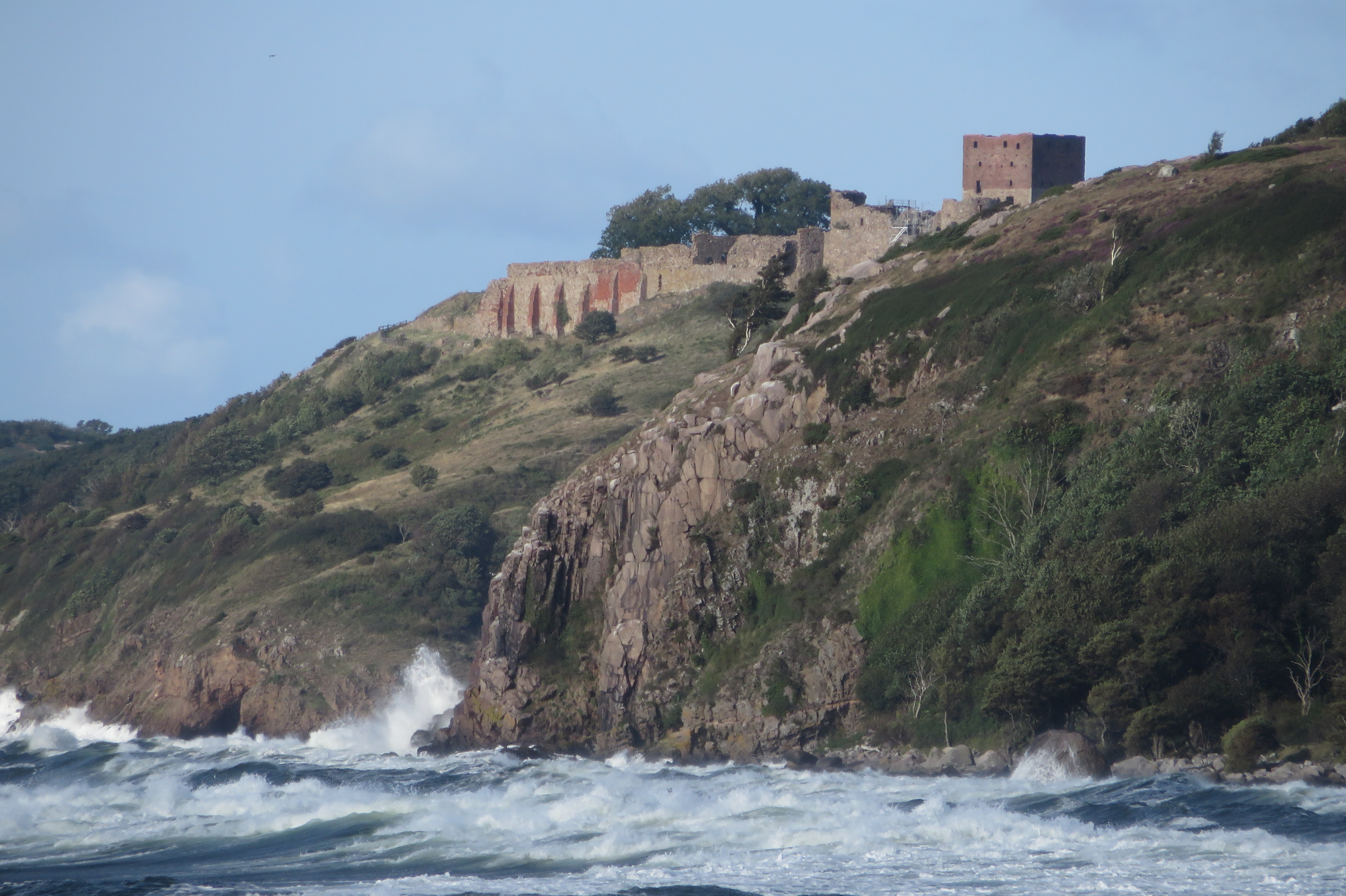
Hammershus from Vang

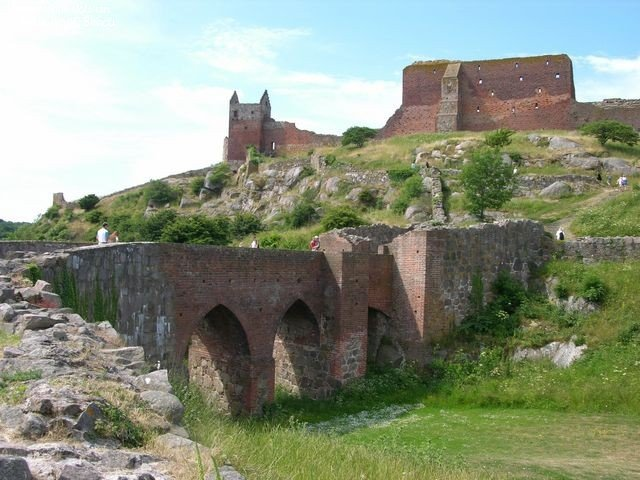
The ruins of Hammershus

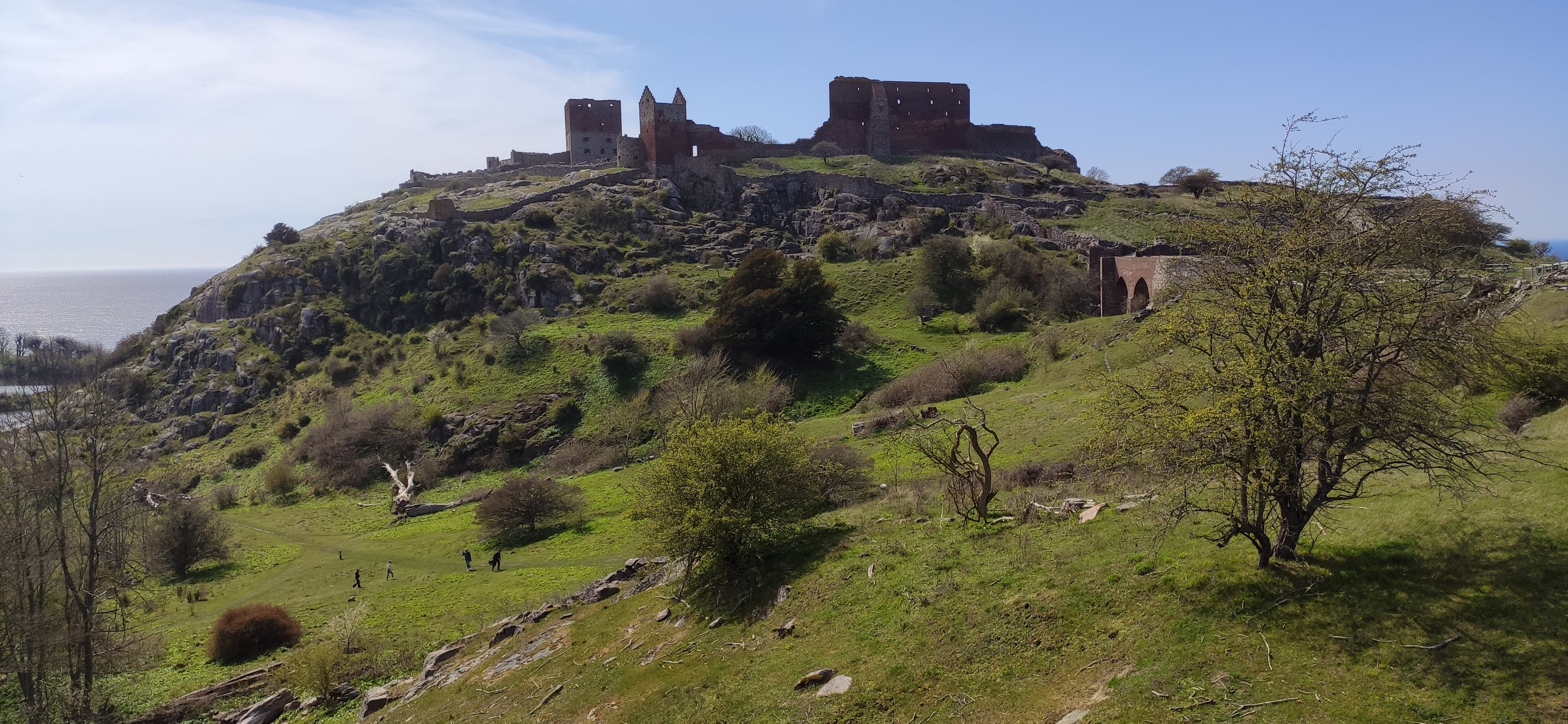
Hammershus, seen from the east

== Other sources ==
- Bornholm Tourist Guide; personal visits of author to Hammershus and the "Kunstmuseum".
- This article is partially based on the corresponding articles on the Swedish and German Wikipedias, accessed on July 20, 2006.

== Works cited ==
- Munthe, Arnold (1910). Klas Fleming, Karl Gustaf Wrangel, Martin Thijsen Anckarhielm, danska kriget 1643—1645: Omfattande tiden från början af år 1645 till och med fredsslutet den 13 augusti. Svenska sjöhjältar (in Swedish). Vol. 5:3. Stockholm: P. A. Norstedt & Söners Förlag. OCLC 479751867.
