= Battle of Wenden (1626) =

1626 battle

- Part of the Polish–Swedish War (1626–1629)
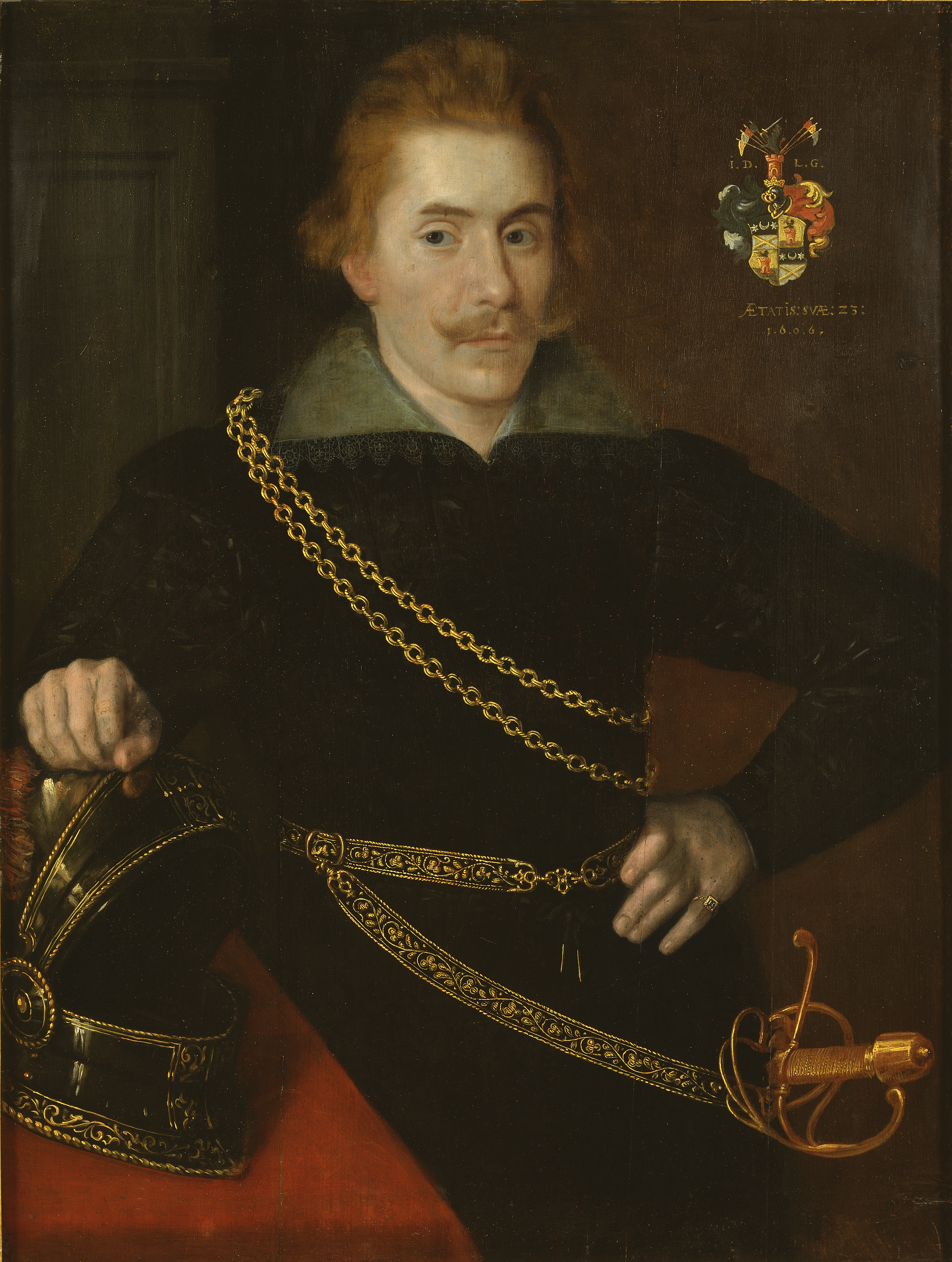
- Portrait of count Jacob de la Gardie - Nationalmuseum - 19206
Date	December 3, 1626
Location	Wenden, Livonia (Cēsis, Latvia) 57°18′48″N 25°16′12″E
Result	Swedish victory

Belligerents
Swedish Empire	Polish–Lithuanian Commonwealth

Commanders and leaders
(Swedish Empire) Gustav Horn	(Polish–Lithuanian Commonwealth) Aleksander Gosiewski

Strength
1,900 (infantry); 1,780 (cavalry); 4 artillery guns	1,500 (mainly cavalry)

Casualties and losses
Unknown, but relatively small	400 killed 40 captured

Battle of Wenden (also known as Battle of Kieś) was fought during the Polish–Swedish War (1626–1629), between Sweden and the Polish–Lithuanian Commonwealth on December 3, 1626, at Wenden (Cēsis, Kiesia) in present-day Latvia. Swedish forces were led by Gustav Horn and Hans Wrangel. Lithuanian forces were led by Aleksander Gosiewski. The Swedes won the battle.

== Opposing forces ==
The Swedish army of 1,900 infantry (mainly musketeers) and 1,780 cavalry under the command of Gustav Horn had reached Drobbusch late on December 2, and there decided to establish a camp for the troops to rest. However, as there were not enough houses for the whole army, only the infantry was quartered within the village, and the cavalry instead rested in nearby woods. During this time, unbeknownst to the Swedes, the Polish field marshal Aleksander Gosiewski approached in their direction with his army of 1500. Gosiewski's aim was to evict the Swedish troops from the village via a surprise attack. At dawn of the next day, November 3, Gosiewski reached the village and executed the attack.

== Battle ==
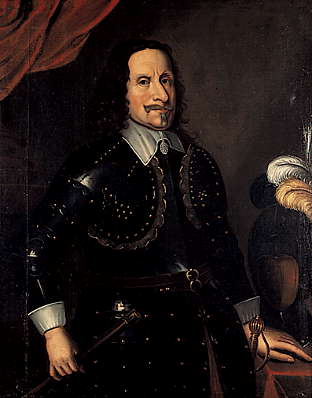
Gustaf Horn, the Swedish military commander at the battle.

The Lithuanians tried to sweep through the entrances of the roads leading to the village, but were repulsed by Swedish sentry detachments long enough for further Swedish support to arrive from the village. Meanwhile, two banners of Cossack (Kozacy) cavalry attempted to cross through the woods in order to outflank the Swedes but were engaged and stopped by a detachment of musketeers. After some fierce fighting in hand-to-hand combat the Lithuanian infantry was repulsed after having suffered several killed and captured.

Horn, then took the initiative and with some musketeers, forced the Lithuanian cavalry away from their advantageous position which had been preventing the Swedish cavalry from participate in the battle. Then, being able to deploy, one Swedish squadron of Finnish cavalry managed to charge and rout, according to letters of Swedish generals, five squadrons of Lithuanian hussars who lost four banners. After a short but fierce fighting the remains of the Lithuanian army were defeated. The Swedish casualties of the battle were light. The Lithuanians however, lost 400 men dead, 40 captured and eight banners.

== Aftermath ==
After the battle the Swedes remained at Drobbusch for two days in order to gather supplies before moving south to push Gosiewski out of Livonia and into Courland. After Gosiewski crossed the Düna river at Yxkull De la Gardie and Horn had to halt their pursuit due to the lack of winter clothing which caused a lot of casualties among the troops from sickness and frostbite. Horn assembled a small force of some 300 cavalry and 200 musketeers, with which he intended to clear out the Lithuanian positions west of the river Ewst.

On the march there, the Swedish cavalry encountered a force of 3 banners of cossack style cavalry who were escorting the Lithuanian baggage and artillery train which had been left behind at Laudon. A fierce action followed in which the "cossacks" fought with great bravery, though losing some 70 men they were able to push their way through with the baggage train but had to leave the cannon behind due to the bad roads. Horn continued his operation and was able to take Berson but Laudon proved to strong from him which effectively ended the winter campaign of 1626–1627.

== Sources ==
- Based on a description made by Swedish expert Daniel Staberg about the battle. The sources include Sveriges Krig 1611-1632 by staff historians, two letters sent to Axel Oxenstierna, written by Gustav Horn respective Gabriel De la Gardie.
- Polish book Wojna inflancka 1625-1629, Henryk Wisner.
