= Christianspris =

Danish fortification

Coordinates: 54.3914°N 10.1861°E

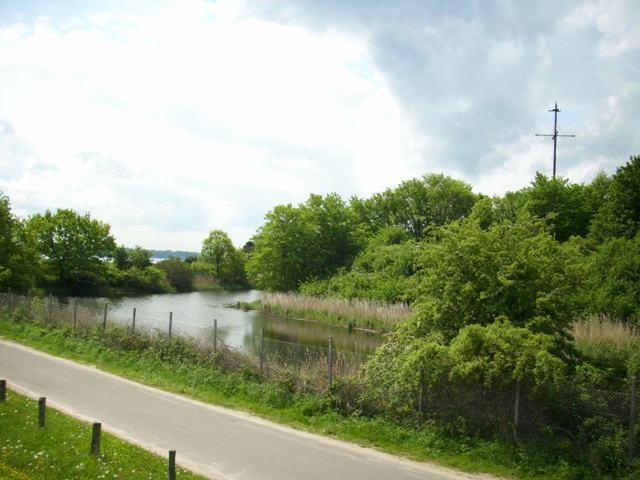
Christianspris

Christianspris or Frederiksort was a Danish fortification somewhat north of the then Danish city of Kiel. In 1632 the Danish king Christian IV initiated the works of making a fortification on a land tongue on the West shore of the Kielerfiord on the Jernved peninsula. The purpose was to secure this land against German troops during the 30-years War. However, the town was short lived. Christian IV founded many towns and cities. The town is notable for being stormed by the Swedes during the Torstenson War during the Jutland Campaign in December 1643.

== Works cited ==
- Englund, Peter (1993). Ofredsår: om den Svenska Stormaktstiden och en man i dess mitt [Years of unrest: about the Swedish Empire and a man in its midst] (in Swedish). Stockholm: Atlantis. ISBN 9789174863499.
