= Gustav Horn =

Swedish military officer (1592–1657)

Count Gustav Horn
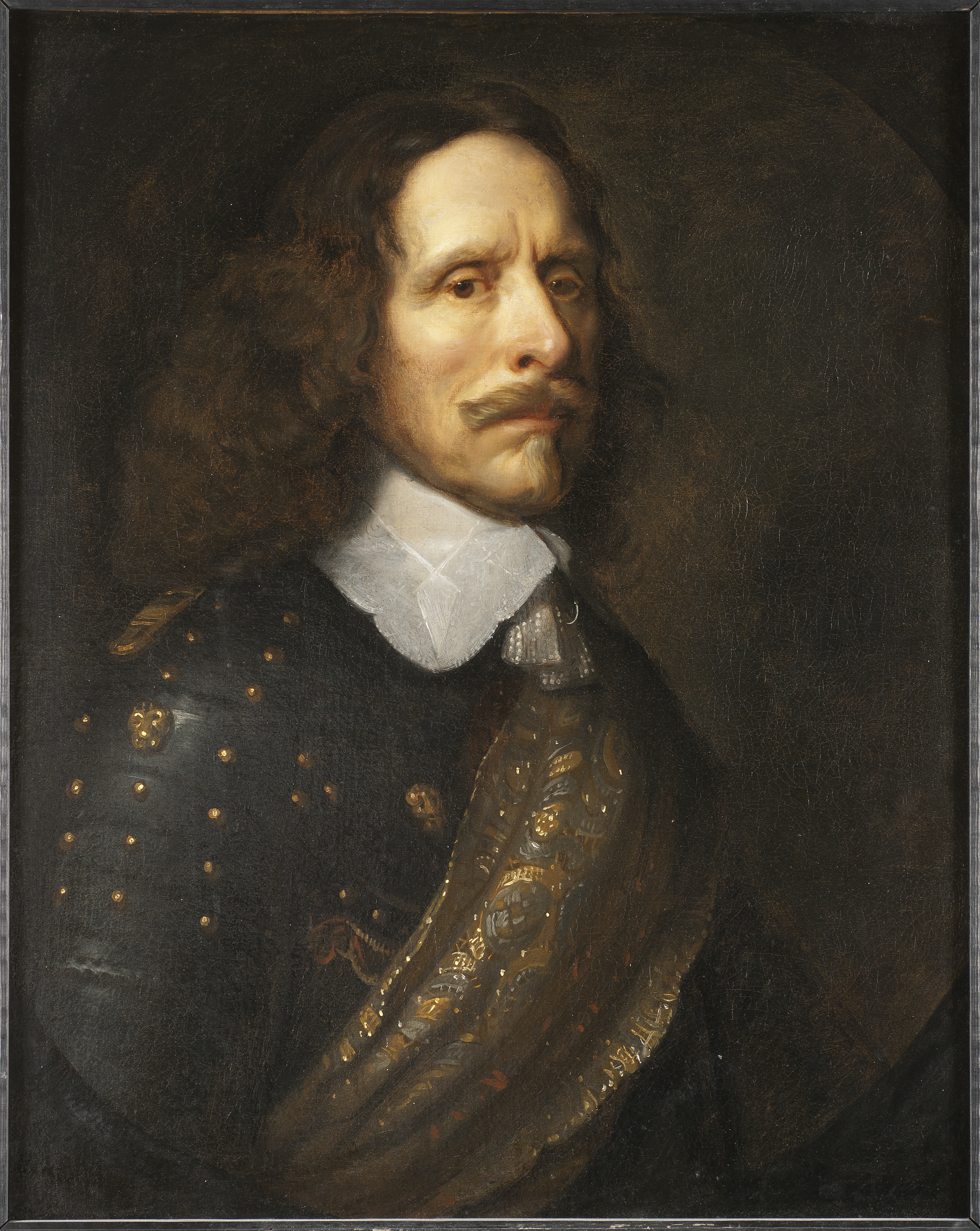
- Portrait by David Beck
- Born: October 22, 1592; Örbyhus Castle, Uppland
- Died: May 10, 1657 (aged 65)
- Allegiance: Sweden
- Rank: Field Marshal
- Conflicts: Ingrian War; Polish–Swedish War (1621–1625); Siege of Riga; Polish–Swedish War (1626–1629); Conquest of Dorpat; Battle of Wallhof; Battle of Wenden; Thirty Years' War; Battle of Falkenberg; Battle of Breitenfeld; Battle of Bamberg; Relief of Konstanz; Battle of Nördlingen (POW); Torstenson War; Siege of Landskrona Citadel; Siege of Laholm Castle; Battle of Rinnebäck Ravine

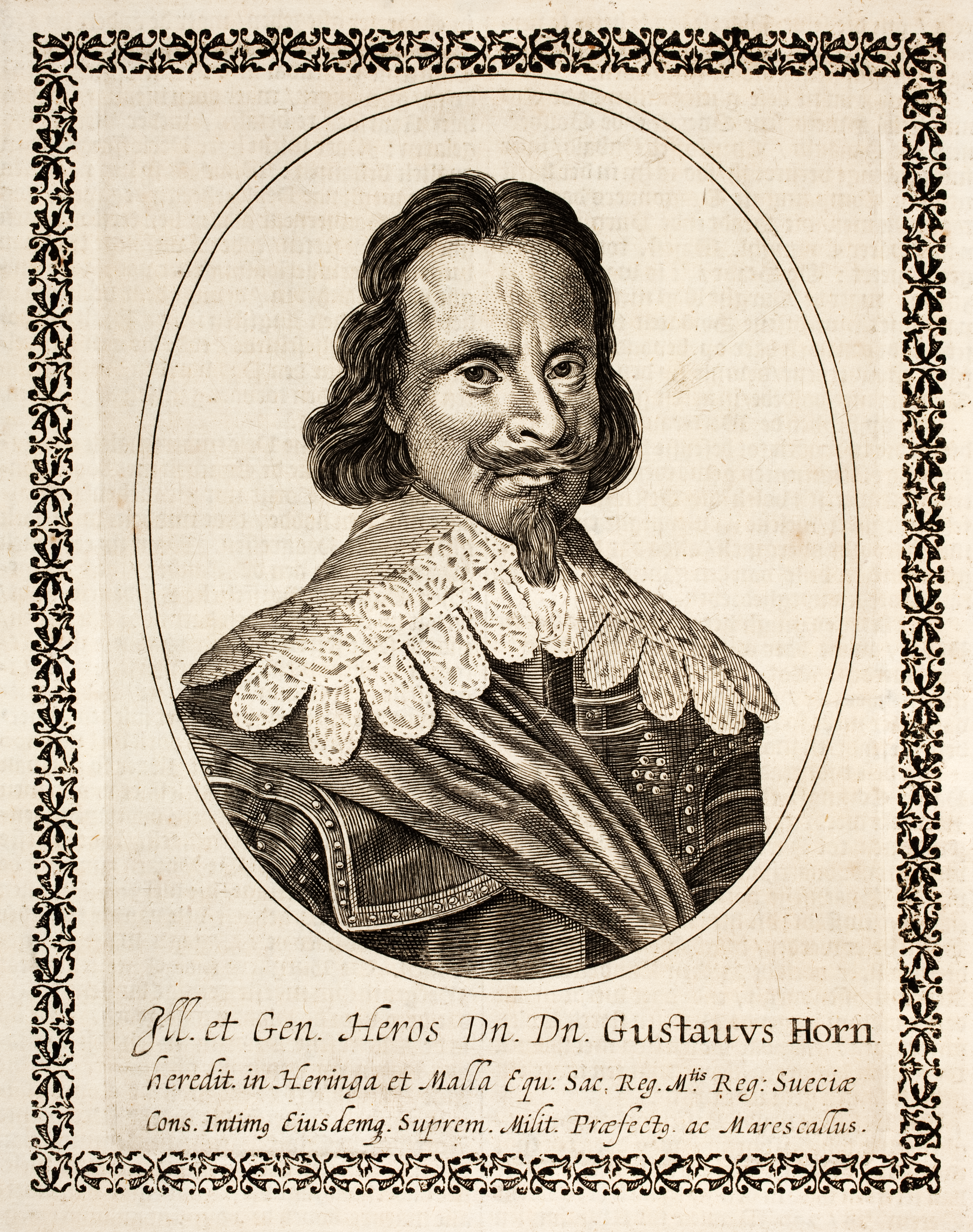
Engraving of Gustav Horn

Count Gustav Horn (October 22, 1592 – May 10, 1657) was a Swedish nobleman, military officer, and Governor-General. He was appointed member of the Royal Council in 1625, Field Marshal in 1628, Governor General of Livonia in 1652 and Lord High Constable since 1653. In the Thirty Years' War (1618–1648), he was instrumental as a commander in securing victory at the Battle of Breitenfeld, in 1631. He was High Councillor of the realm in 1625, elevated to the rank of field marshal in 1628, and sometimes commander-in-chief of Swedish forces in Germany during Thirty Years' War. After the war, he served as Governor-General of Livonia 1652, President of War department and Lord High Constable in 1653. In 1651, Queen Christina created him Count of Björneborg (Horn af Björneborg).

== Biography ==
=== Background ===
Gustav Horn was born on October 22, 1592 at Örbyhus in Uppsala County, Sweden. He was the youngest son of Field Marshal Karl Henriksson Horn and Agneta von Dellwig. He was born while his father was imprisoned in Örbyhus Castle at Tierp. He was born into the Swedish noble family Horn af Kankas and was educated extensively in European universities. He studied military sciences under prince Maurice of Orange in the Netherlands. He participated in the Ingrian War against Russia under the leadership of Evert Horn for two years.

As a colonel, Gustav Horn took part in the siege of Riga in 1621 and was seriously wounded. In 1625, he was knighted, appointed to the Privy Council, made supreme commander of the Finnish troops, and named lagman of northern Finland. He led troops which conquered Dorpat in Livonian Estonia. With Count Jakob De la Gardie, he led the defense of Livonia against Poland in the late 1620s. At age 35, he was elevated to the rank of Field Marshal by King Gustav II Adolf. He also led troops in the Battle of Wallhof and the Batte of Wenden in 1626.

=== Command of Swedish forces ===
When King Gustav II Adolf decided to join the war in Germany (1630), he appointed Gustav Horn as his second in command. At the Battle of Breitenfeld in 1631, Horn prevented the Imperial force under Tilly from flanking the main body of the Swedish army, after their Saxon allies had fled the field. After this Horn led troops in Upper (southern) Franconia and conquered among others, Mergentheim, the town of the Teutonic Order and the bishopric of Bamberg). He then went to Bavaria with the king. Horn was sent to lead troops in the Rhineland, where he occupied Koblenz and Trier, and continued to Swabia.

After the death of King Gustav II Adolf at Lützen in November 1632, Field Marshal Horn and General John Banér were appointed to the overall command of Swedish forces in Germany. Gustav Horn's father-in-law, the Chancellor Oxenstierna, took the leadership of the civil government. When Horn was ordered to combine his troops with those of Bernhard of Weimar, the two men found themselves unable to work together, and they were given separate commands. After Wallenstein's murder in 1634, Horn took some areas in Swabia: in the spring of that year, his troops unsuccessfully laid siege to the imperial city of Überlingen, which would have been a rich and valuable prize. In early September 1634, his forces, and those of Bernard of Saxony, were crushed at the Battle of Nördlingen by combined Habsburg and Spanish forces. Horn was taken prisoner and held by the Roman Catholic army in Burghausen Castle until 1642. He was exchanged for three imperial generals.

=== Later career ===
Following his exchange, Horn was appointed Vice President of the War Department. During the war against Denmark-Norway in 1644, Horn led the attack on Scania and conquered the whole province, except the towns of Malmö and Kristianstad. During the campaign, he successfully besieged Landskrona Citadel and in May he successfully besieged Laholm Castle as well. On October 17 1644, he defeated a Danish force at Rinnebäck Ravine. Malmö's siege lasted until the Treaty of Brömsebro brought the war to an end.

In 1651, Horn received Pori (Björneborg) on the west coast of Finland. His estate at Alūksne in Livonia (Marienborg) was made into a barony. Horn then served as Governor-General in Livonia, and as Lord High Constable of the empire, becoming Lord President of the War Department. When the war against the Polish–Lithuanian Commonwealth broke out in 1655, Horn directed the defense of Sweden against possible Polish invasion.

Gustav Horn was one of the most capable of Gustav II Adolf's military commanders, and also an able administrator. His particular skills were in arranging defenses for several sorts of situations. He also maintained relatively strict discipline, so his troops did not plunder and pillage as much as others.

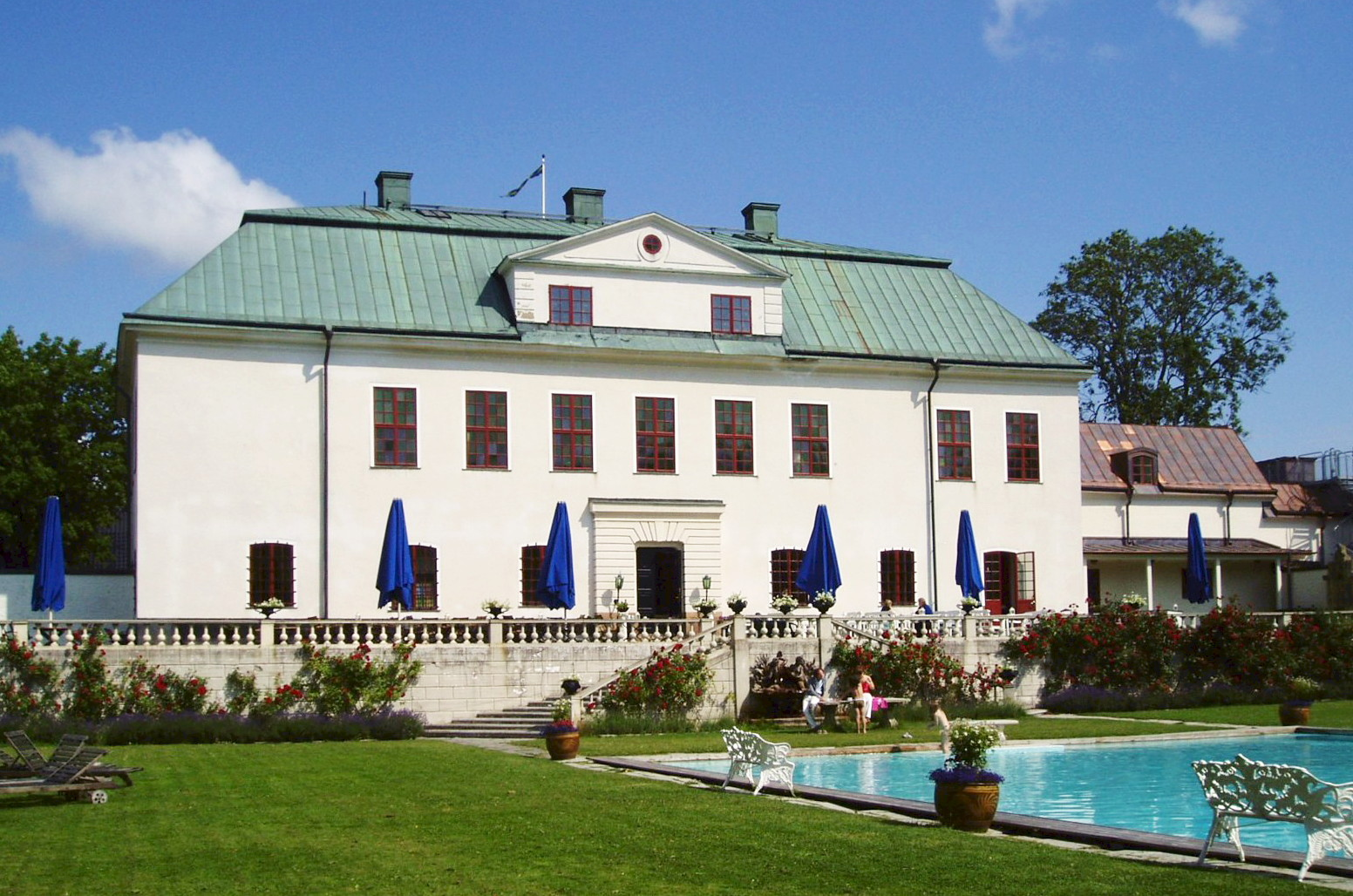
Häringe Manor (Häringe slott)

== Häringe Manor ==
Gustav Horn acquired Häringe Manor (Häringe slott) at Västerhaninge parish in Södermanland during 1625. The estate was received as a gift from King Gustav II Adolf. The main building was built on the initiative of Gustav Horn and was completed in 1657. After the death of Gustav Horn on May 10, 1657, the estate was inherited by his daughter Agneta Horn (1629–1672), by her daughter Brita Cruus, by her daughter Agneta Wrede, by her daughter Hedvig Catharina Lillie (1695–1745) in 1730 and then by Carl Julius De la Gardie (1729–1786) in 1745.

== Family ==
In 1628, Horn was married first to Kristina Oxenstierna (1612–1631), a daughter of the Count and Chancellor Axel Oxenstierna. They had two children in just two years:

1. Agneta Horn (1629–1672), who married baron Lars Cruus of Gudhem, Lord of Harviala.
2. Axel Horn (1630–1631), who died in infancy.

Kristina Horn died of the plague in Stettin in 1631, aged only 19. In 1643, Horn, remarried, to Sigrid Bielke (1620–1679); they had nine children in just 12 years, of which only two survived to adulthood:

1. Anna Katarina Horn (born and died in 1644)
2. Kristina Horn (born and died in 1646), twin of Ebba
3. Ebba Sigrid Horn (born and died in 1646), twin of Kristina
4. Helena Horn (1647–1648), who died in infancy.
5. Maria Eleonora Horn (1648–1652), who died in childhood.
6. Gustav Karl Horn (1650–1654), who died in childhood.
7. Evert Horn (1652–1654), who died in childhood.
8. Eva Horn (1653–1740), who married Nils Bielke.
9. Hedvig Lovisa Horn (1655– c. 1715), who married firstly Ture Karlsson Sparre and secondly Bernhard von Liewen.

== See also ==
- Horn family

== Works cited ==
- Vessberg, Vilhelm [in Swedish] (1895). Gustaf Horns fälttåg [Gustaf Horn's campaign]. Bidrag till historien om Sveriges krig med Danmark 1643–1645 (in Swedish). Vol. 1. Stockholm: Ivar Hæggströms Boktryckeri.
