= Siege of Laholm Castle =

Part of the Torstenson War

- Part of the Torstenson War
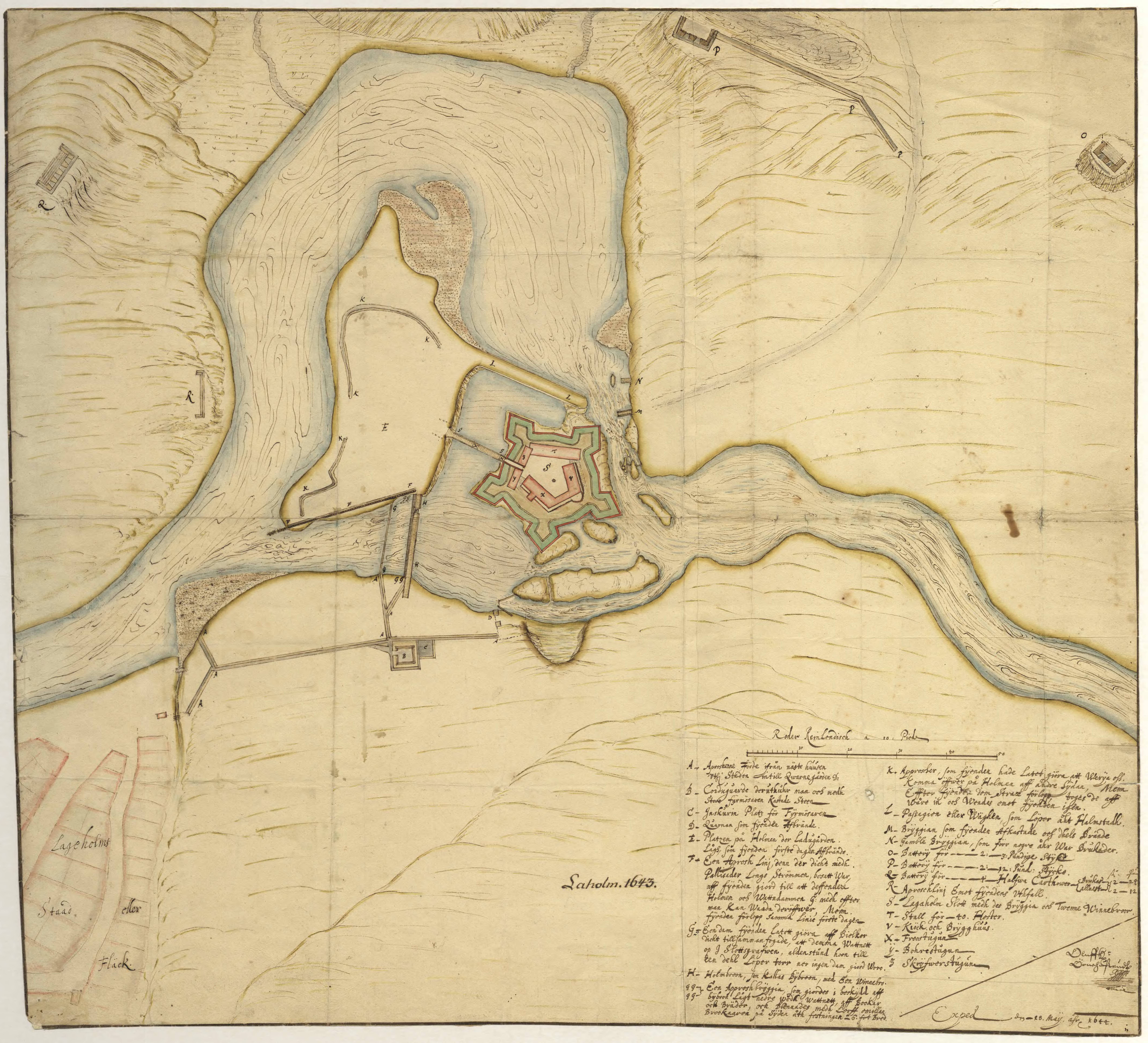
- Map of the Swedish siege by Olof Örnehufvud
Date	2–15 May 1644
Location	Lagaholm Castle (Laholm), Halland 56°31′N 13°02′E
Result	Swedish victory
Territorial changes	Lagaholm Castle is captured by Swedish forces

Belligerents
(yes) Swedish Empire	Denmark–Norway

Commanders and leaders
(yes) Gustav Horn (yes) Olof Örnehufvud	Björn Ulfeld

Units involved
Unknown	Lagaholm garrison

Strength
Unknown	Garrison; 150 men Kristian Sinckler's force 500 cavalry

Casualties and losses
9 killed 16 wounded	Unknown

The siege of Laholm Castle (Swedish: belägringen av Laholm slott) occurred from 2 to 15 May 1644 during Gustav Horn's invasion of Scania, as part of the Torstenson War.

After Sweden went to war with Denmark in 1643, two Swedish armies invaded Denmark. One, under the command of Lennart Torstensson, invaded Jutland, while the other, led by Gustav Horn, invaded Scania. After capturing Lund, Helsingborg, and Landskrona, Horn moved against Laholm.

After occupying the town of Laholm on 2 May, Horn besieged the castle, where a garrison of 150 men under the command of Björn Ulfeld was holed up. After days of mutual bombardment and failed demands for capitulation, the two sides eventually opened negotiations, which finalized on 14 May. The Danes marched out and surrendered the castle to the Swedes on 15 May.

== Background ==
Frustrated with Danish actions during the Thirty Years' War, including blockading Hamburg, agitating peasants on the Dano-Swedish border, and rumours of negotiations with the Holy Roman Empire, Swedish Chancellor Axel Oxenstierna began planning a preemptive war with Denmark in May 1643.

A Swedish army commanded by Lennart Torstensson was to invade Denmark via Jutland, secure the peninsula, and then transported to the Danish islands for an attack on Copenhagen. The plan also outlined an invasion of Scania by Gustav Horn, who would then join forces with Torstensson to launch a joint attack on Copenhagen. By January 1644, Torstensson had crossed the border into Jutland.

=== Prelude ===
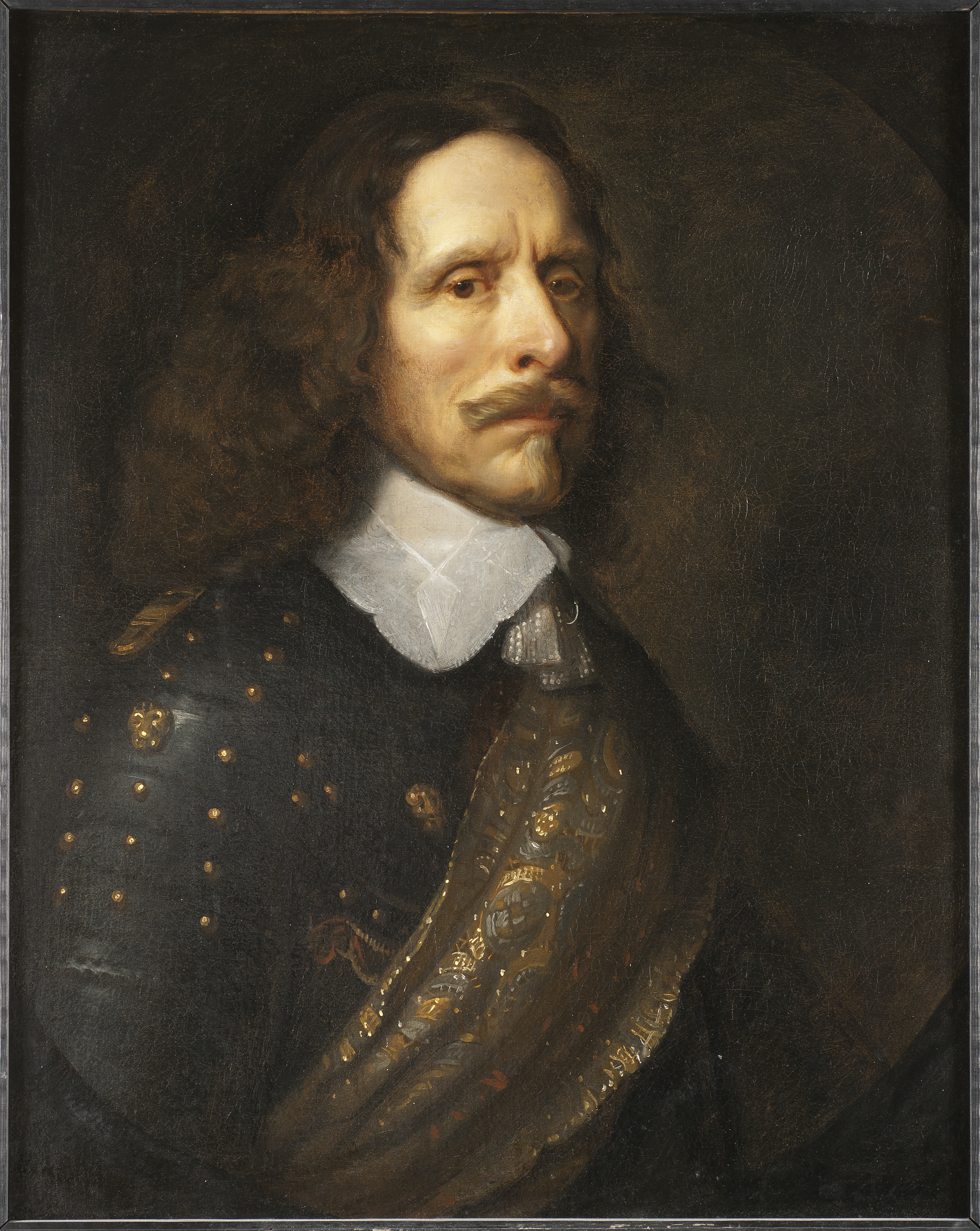
17th-century portrait portrait of Gustav Horn by Dutch painter David Beck

By October 1643, preparations for the Swedish invasion of Scania were underway, with Lars Kagg placed in charge. Gustav Horn was ordered to muster an army of 7,700 infantry and 3,100 cavalry and to cross the border by February 1644, while avoiding unnecessary sieges. By mid-February, Horn had assembled a force of 7,700 infantry, 2,900 cavalry, six 12-pounder guns, 22 3-pounder guns, and two mortars. He crossed the border south of Markaryd on 14 February.

Six days after crossing the border, Horn seized Helsingborg before capturing Lund. Due to a lack of siege artillery, he could not move against Malmö. However, once the artillery arrived in mid-March, he moved against Landskrona on 30 March. Landskrona fell to the Swedes on 7 April, and Horn moved towards Laholm.

After crossing the Lagan River, Horn dispersed a group of 100 men, capturing several prisoners as he continued towards Laholm. Major Kristian Sinckler fled into Laholm with 500 cavalry, as he did not dare withdraw to Kristianstad.

==== Situation in Lagaholm ====
Horn occupied the town of Laholm on 2 May, which had been abandoned by the Danes. Laholm castle, also called Lagaholm, was northeast of the town and situated on a large islet in the Lagan. Next to Lagaholm was another islet containing the castle’s farm buildings. Despite its position and thick walls, the castle had not been properly maintained and was dilapidated. The garrison consisted of 150 men under the command of Björn Ulfeld.

== Siege ==
Immediately after occupying the town, Horn began digging trenches and constructing batteries. These batteries, whose construction was led by Olof Örnehufvud, included three that were situated on the northern bank of the Lagan and another with a mortar on the southern side of the bridgehead. The Danes evacuated the farm islet and burned the buildings there, although the redoubts were in good condition. The Swedes slowly advanced towards the castle under the command of Örnehufvud from both the town and the farm islet, and they built a trestle bridge which was covered with turf to protect against the castle's bombardment.

The Danes also remained passive, rarely fired on the Swedes and did not sortie. However, on 9 May, they began bombarding the Swedes more heavily, and a fire destroyed a quarter of the town. Additionally, heavy cannons and a large mortar arrived from Jönköping on the same day, and were brought to the Swedish batteries before opening fire on 10 May. Horn sent a trumpeter to demand that the castle capitulate after two rounds had been fired from the heavy guns, but this was met with musket fire. As a result, Horn ordered every battery to bombard the castle.

On 11 May, a drunk officer on night watch opened communication with the garrison, contrary to orders. Horn initially reacted negatively, but then sent a second officer to demand that the castle surrender. A ceasefire was called, and Ulfeld was given until the morning to consider. He also apologized for the Swedish trumpeter being fired upon, saying it had happened without his knowledge. During the ceasefire, Horn studied the terrain around the castle, and Swedish troops were even allowed to cross onto the islet. On 12 May, Horn once again demanded that the castle surrender, but this was rejected by Ulfeld, saying that Horn, who was a "sensible high-ranking military officer", would understand that the castle could not be surrendered.

After his demand for capitulation was rejected, Horn immediately began bombarding the castle, and the Swedes occupied the trenches that the Danes had built on the farm islet. The Swedish bombardment continued on 12 and 13 May. On the evening of 13 May, the Danes requested negotiations, and on 14 May, the negotiations concluded, with the Danish garrison marching out on 15 May.

== Aftermath ==
Under the terms, the Danish garrison marched out with flying banners and music, heading towards Halmstad. They were allowed to bring their children, wives, servants, and household members, along with their horses and baggage. The troops who were not part of the garrison were initially prisoners of war. An exception to this was Sinckler’s own company, 150 men in total, who were also allowed to leave under the same terms as the garrison, though they instead went to Kristianstad. However, the remaining men in Sinckler's force were sent home after they surrendered their weapons. The Swedes, who had suffered 9 killed and 16 wounded during the siege, seized all land registers and treasury records, which provided information about the revenue of the surrounding province. They also took provisions, ammunition, and cannons as spoils of war. The capture of the castle meant that the Swedes had severed Danish communications between Scania and Halland.

== See also ==
- Siege of Landskrona Citadel – Part of the Torstenson War
- Torstensson's Jutland campaign – Swedish invasion of Jutland 1643–1644
