= Siege of Landskrona Citadel =

Part of the Torstenson War

- Part of the Torstenson War
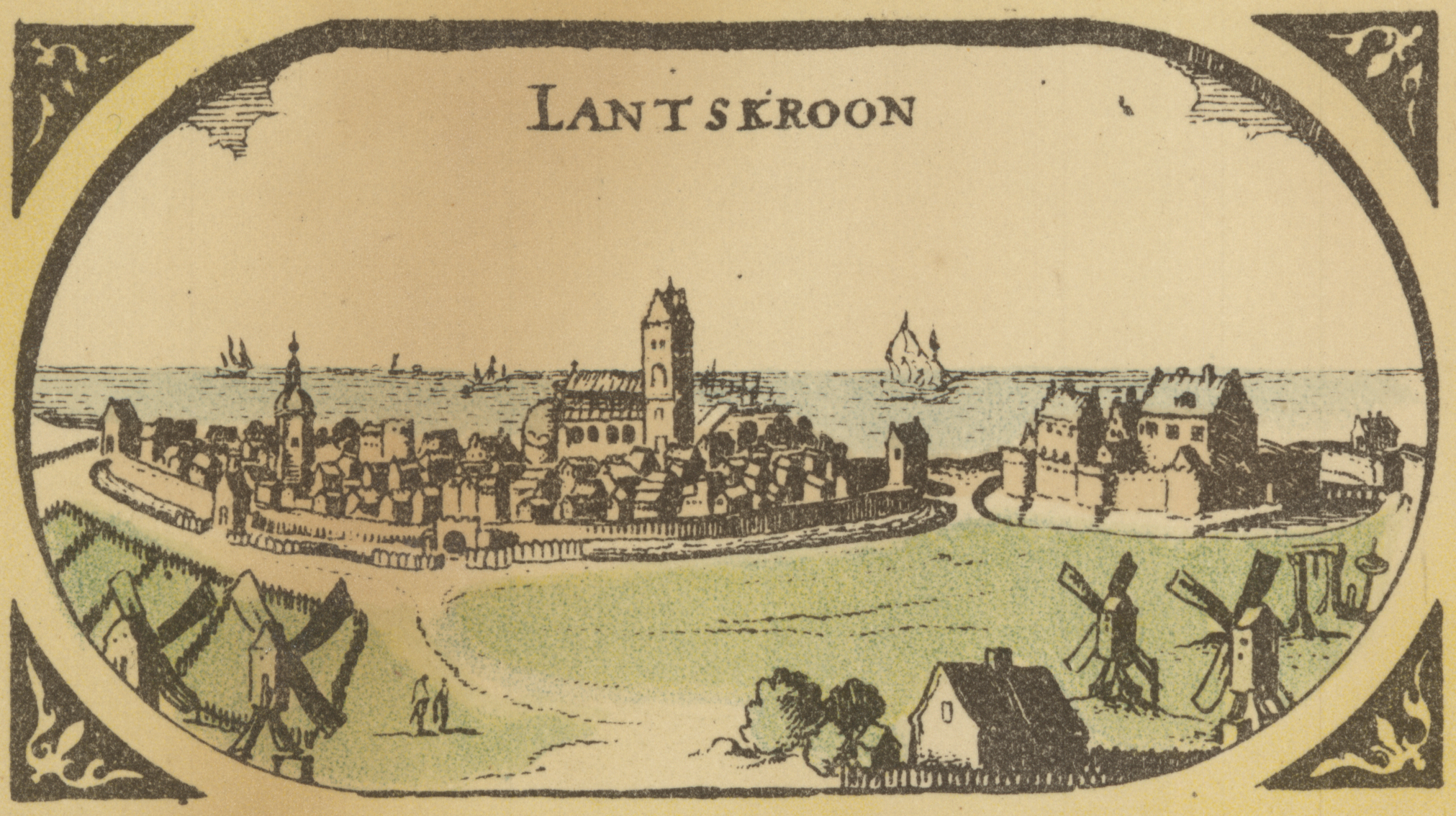
- View of Landskrona in 1629 by Jan Janssonius
Date	31 March – 7 April 1644
Location	Landskrona (Landskrona Citadel), Scania 55.873056°N 12.8225°E
Result	Swedish victory
Territorial changes	Landskrona Citadel is captured by Swedish forces

Belligerents
(yes) Swedish Empire	Denmark–Norway

Commanders and leaders
(yes) Gustav Horn	Henrik Huitfeld; Joachim Gersdorf; Fredrik Rantzau

Units involved
Unknown	Landskrona garrison

Strength
5,300 men 8 guns	300–400 men 3 ships

Casualties and losses
12 killed 25 wounded	Unknown

The siege of Landskrona Citadel (Swedish: belägringen av Landskrona slott) occurred from 31 March to 7 April during Gustav Horn's invasion of Scania, in the Torstenson War.

After Sweden went to war with Denmark in 1643, two Swedish armies invaded Denmark. One, under the command of Lennart Torstensson, invaded Jutland, while the other, led by Gustav Horn, invaded Scania. After capturing Lund and Helsingborg, Horn moved towards Landskrona on 30 March with around half of the Swedish army in Scania.

The Swedes quickly occupied the town and began besieging Landskrona Citadel after the Danes refused to surrender. During the siege, the Swedes began constructing a floating bridge across the Danish moat, and they had also repelled men sent towards the citadel by three Danish warships. On 7 April, after the floating bridge had finished construction, the Danes capitulated on the same day.

== Background ==
Frustrated with Danish actions during the Thirty Years' War, including blockading Hamburg, agitating peasants on the Dano-Swedish border, and rumors of negotiations with the Holy Roman Empire, Axel Oxenstierna began planning a pre-emptive war with Denmark in May 1643.

A Swedish army commanded by Lennart Torstensson was to invade Denmark through Jutland, secure the peninsula, and then be shipped to the Danish islands for an attack on Copenhagen. It also outlined an invasion of Scania by Gustav Horn, who would then join forces with Torstensson and jointly attack Copenhagen. By January 1644, Torstensson had crossed the border into Jutland.

=== Prelude ===
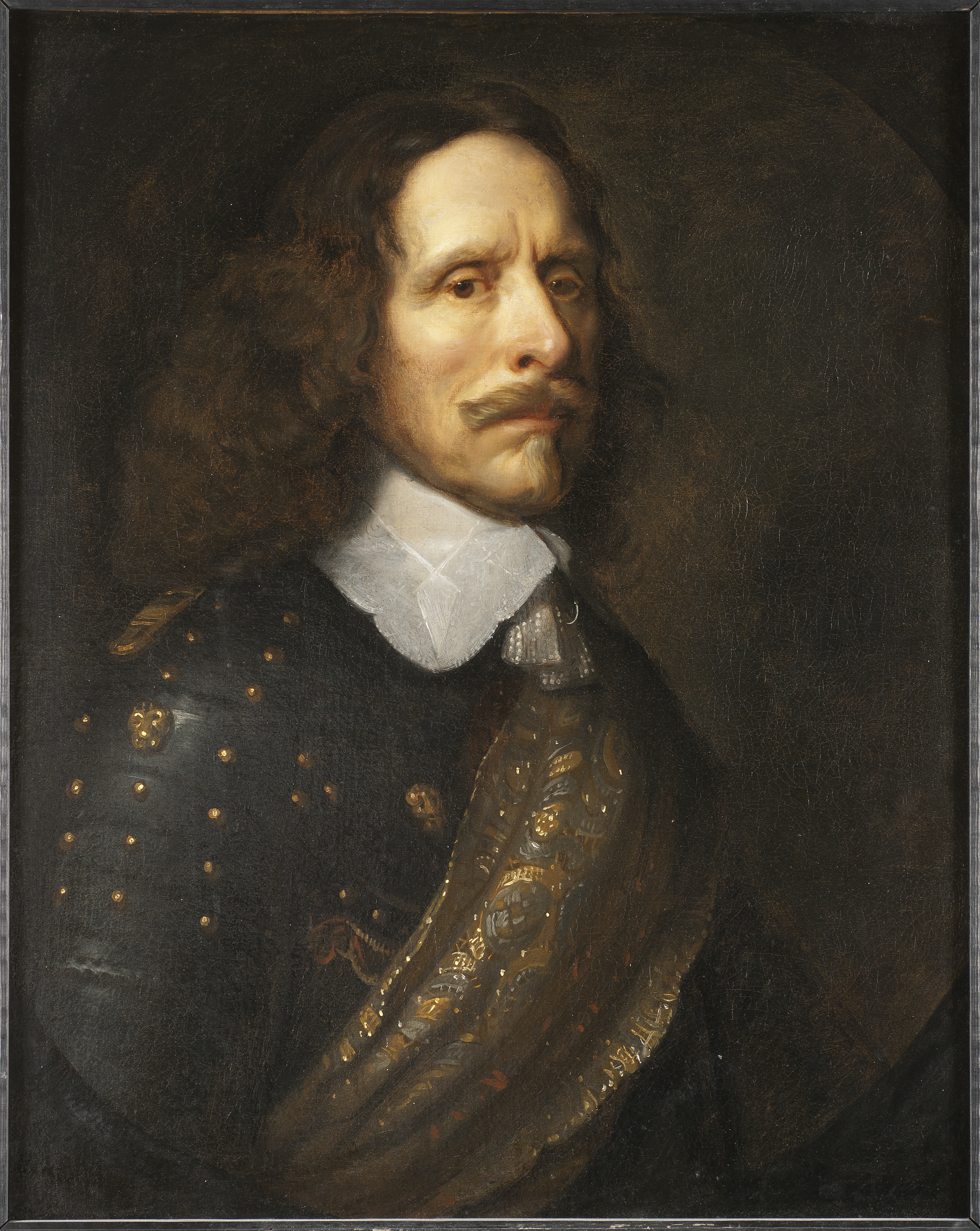
17th-century portrait portrait of Gustav Horn by Dutch painter David Beck

By October 1643, preparations for the Swedish invasion of Scania were underway, with Lars Kagg put in charge of them. Gustav Horn was ordered to muster an army of 7,700 infantry and 3,100 cavalry and to cross the border by February 1644, while avoiding unnecessary sieges. By mid-February, Horn had assembled a force of 7,700 infantry, 2,900 cavalry, six 12-pounder guns, 22 3-pounder guns, and two mortars. He crossed the border south of Markaryd on 14 February.

Six days after crossing the border, Horn seized Helsingborg and later captured Lund. Due to his lack of siege artillery, he could not move against Malmö. However, once the artillery arrived in mid-March, he first moved against Landskrona on 30 March.

== Siege ==
Horn initially sent Lieutenant Colonel Måns Isaksson to reconnoitre Landskrona in order to determine how it could be captured and to prevent it from being set on fire by the Danes. The Swedes unexpectedly discovered that the town had been abandoned and subsequently occupied it. The town was surrounded by a rampart or palisade, along with marshland and water, meaning it could be defended without much difficulty. The Danes had also destroyed a floating bridge toward the citadel. Horn set out with half the army on 31 March, leaving the rest of it at Lund under the command of Lars Kagg. Estimates of the Danish garrison in Landskrona Citadel vary. According to Vilhelm Vessberg, it amounted to 400 men. while other sources estimate it at 300 men, with Anders Fryxell specifying 274 peasants and 26 soldiers, Vessberg also notes that there were 26 soldiers and that the rest were peasants. The garrison was commanded by Henrik Huitfeld, alongside Joachim Gersdorf and Fredrik Rantzau.

After Huitfeld refused to surrender, Horn ordered trenches to be dug, which advanced quickly. One trench extended eastward from Säby Gate, while another ran westward to the shore. The Swedes also built four batteries, one of which was built between the citadel's moat and shore to prevent communication by sea. In total, the Swedes artillery consisted of two kartouwe guns, two 3-pounders, two 11-pounders, and two 12-pounders. Using a dam, Horn lowered the moat's water level by two feet, though it remained seven feet deep. However, the Swedes were able to significantly reduce the width of the rampart or palisade. Despite heavy bombardment, the garrison failed to inflict any damage to a floating bridge constructed out into the moat by the Swedes. During the siege, three Danish warships also arrived outside the town and fired on the Swedish forces, killing four men. The warships attempted to send troops into the citadel, but these were repelled by the Swedes.

After the construction of a floating bridge had been completed and laid out across the moat, the Danes began negotiations and capitulated on 7 April.

== Aftermath ==
Aside from Gersdorf, who was held back to ensure that no mines remained in the citadel, Henrik Huitfeld and Fredrik Rantzau were allowed to depart for Malmö. Gersdorf was permitted to leave once their baggage train had returned. The Swedes did not plunder, and returned some of Huitfeld's belongings that had been taken.

During the siege, the Swedes suffered no more than 12 killed and 25 wounded, and Landskrona became Horn's headquarters for the remainder of the campaign.

After the citadel fell, 1,000 men under Lars Kagg's command were left behind to garrison it.

== See also ==
- Torstensson's Jutland campaign – Swedish invasion of Jutland 1643–1644
- Battle of Fehmarn (1644) – Part of the Torstenson War
