= David Beck (painter) =

Dutch Golden Age portrait painter (1621–1656)

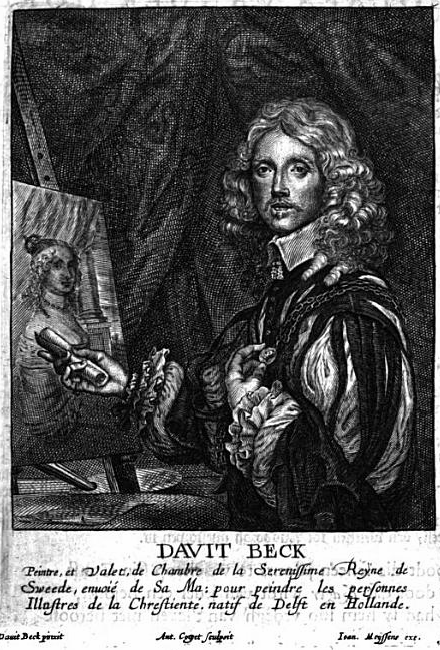
Davit Beck in Het Gulden Cabinet, p. 161

David Beck (or Beek; May 25, 1621 – December 20, 1656) was a Dutch Golden Age portrait painter.

== Biography ==
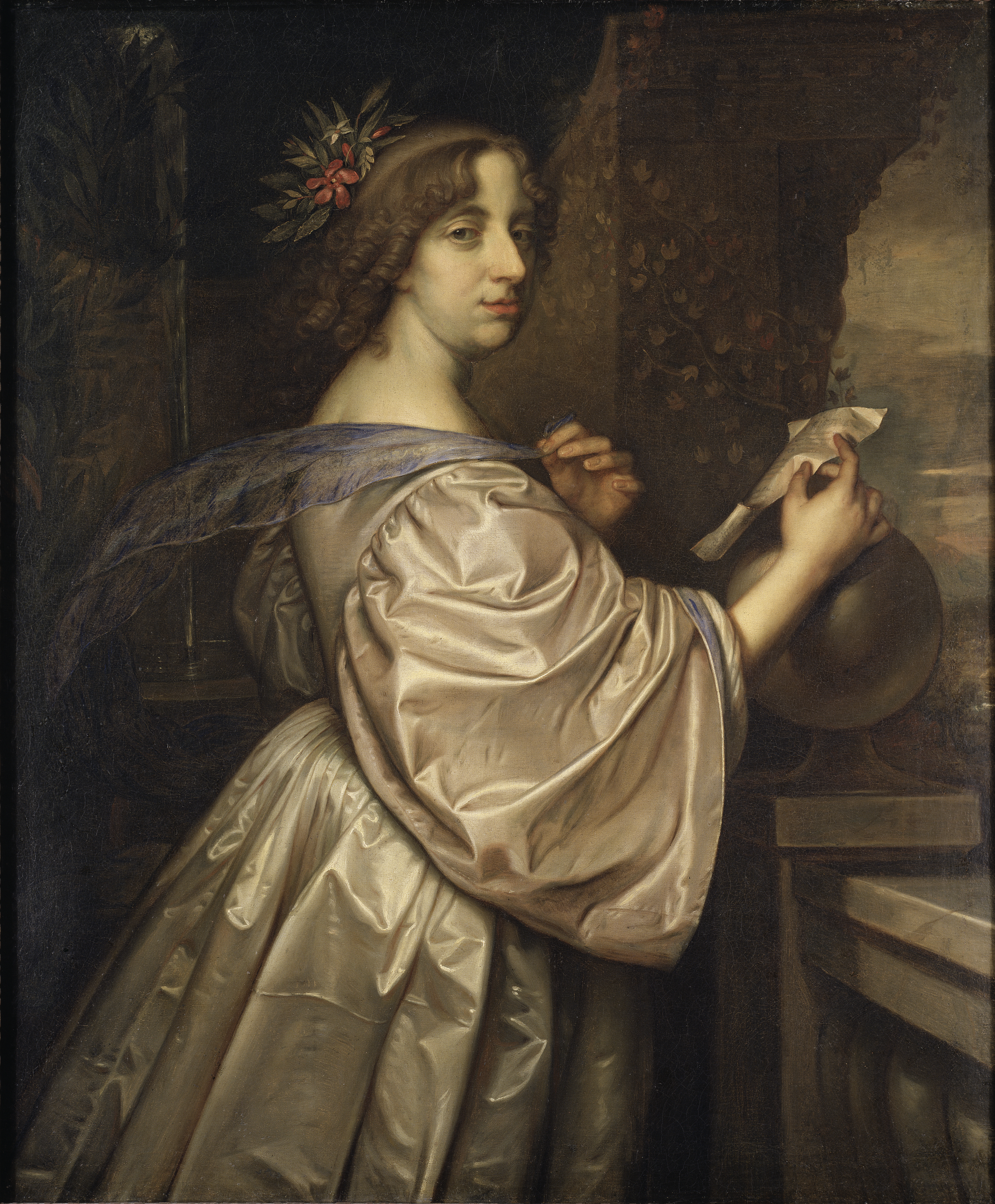
Portrait of Queen Christina of Sweden

Beck was born in Delft, and was named after his uncle, a well-known poet from Arnhem. He was the son of a schoolmaster in Delft, where he learned painting from Michiel Jansz. van Mierevelt, a prominent portrait painter in the Netherlands. Late in 1640 he moved to London to join Anthony van Dyck's studio as a pupil and assistant, but had little time to learn from Van Dyck himself as the latter fell ill and died in 1641. Beck possessed the freedom of hand and readiness, or rather rapidity of execution, for which Van Dyck was so remarkable, in so much that when Charles I observed the expeditious manner of Beck's painting, he exclaimed, "Faith! Beck, I believe you could paint riding post" and asked him to teach his sons drawing.

He taught drawing to Charles II of England and his brothers James II of England, and Henry Stuart, Duke of Gloucester. After the outbreak of the English Civil War that eventually led to the execution of his patron Charles I, Beck left England to travel around the courts of Europe. In 1647, he was appointed portrait painter and valet de chambre to Queen Christina of Sweden in Stockholm, and he executed portraits of most of the sovereigns of Europe to adorn her gallery.

Christina sent him on tour to the European courts, apparently also for political purposes. While sick in Germany he was thought dead and prepared for burial, but he revived and was gradually restored to life. He joined Christina's court again in Rome in 1655, followed her to France in 1656. He asked leave from her company to visit his friends and family in the Netherlands, which according to Houbraken was against her wishes. His death at The Hague that same year was suspected of being due to poisoning.
