= Lorens von der Linde =

Swedish field marshal (1610–1670)

Baron Lorens von der Linde
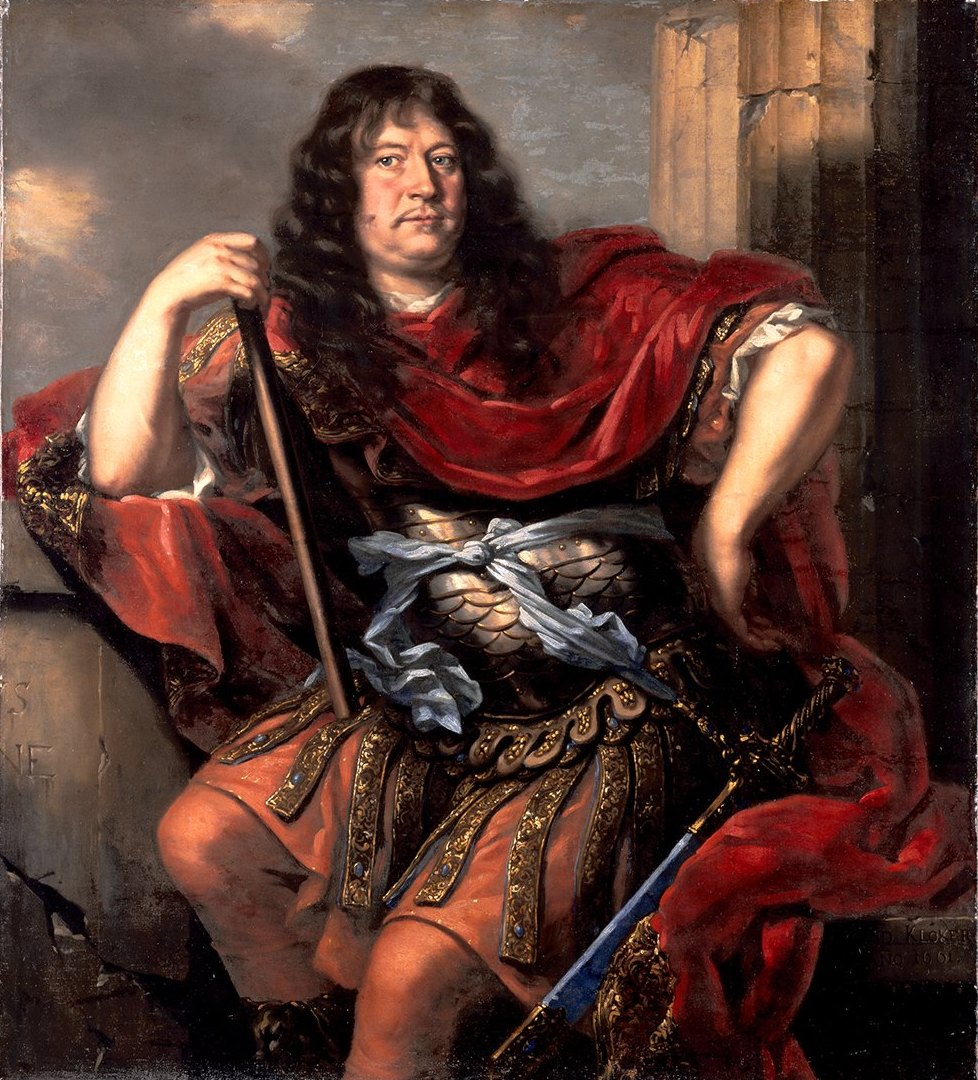
- 1661 portrait
- Born: 20 July 1610; Stockholm, Sweden
- Died: 25 June 1670 (aged 59); Stockholm, Sweden
- Military career
- Allegiance: Sweden
- Rank: Field marshal
- Conflicts: Torstensson War; Thirty Years War; Battle of Jankau; Siege of Brno; Northern War of 1655–1660

Baron Lorens von der Linde (20 July 1610 – 25 June 1670) was a Swedish general and nobleman. After an education at Leiden University he joined a German army and commanded a Swedish regiment in the 1643–1645 Torstenson War. Linde fought in the 1645 Battle of Jankau and Siege of Brno and other actions in the remainder of the Thirty Years' War. He was appointed to the war council and Privy Council of Christina, Queen of Sweden in 1651 and made a baron in 1653. Linde retained his titles and roles under Christina's successor, Charles X Gustav, and became a close confidant of the new king. He accompanied Charles in the Northern War of 1655–1660 against the Polish–Lithuanian Commonwealth and was placed in command of Swedish forces in Pomerania and Prussia. After Charles' death in 1660, Linde remained active on the war council and the privy council. He was made lieutenant field marshal in 1658 and field marshal in 1665.

== Early life and career ==
Linde was born on 20 July 1610 in Stockholm, the son of civil servant Erik Larsson von der Linde, who had been born in Holland. On 17 February 1627, he enrolled at Leiden University, in Holland. After his studies, Linde joined a German army. By the start of the Torstenson War (part of the Thirty Years' War) between Sweden and Denmark–Norway in 1643, he was a colonel in command of a regiment of the Swedish army of Lennart Torstensson. Linde led his regiment in the 6 March 1645 Battle of Jankau, a victory for Sweden over the Holy Roman Empire. He was also present at the 1645 Siege of Brno and other actions. Linde returned to Sweden in 1645 and was offered the position of master of the stables by Christina, Queen of Sweden. Linde wrote to Carl Gustaf Wrangel, commander in chief of the Swedish forces in the field, to complain that he would rather be with his musketeers on campaign than with the fine ladies of the court. Linde was promoted to major-general on 29 May 1647 and on 30 July was given command of the garrison at Stade, Lower Saxony.

Linde became a member of the Swedish war council in April 1651 and the Privy Council in 1653. Linde was appointed a baron by Christina in 1653 and granted land in Medelpad. Later that same year he was made the first commander of a new company of the Life Guards that consisted only of noblemen.

== Under the House of Palatinate-Zweibrücken ==
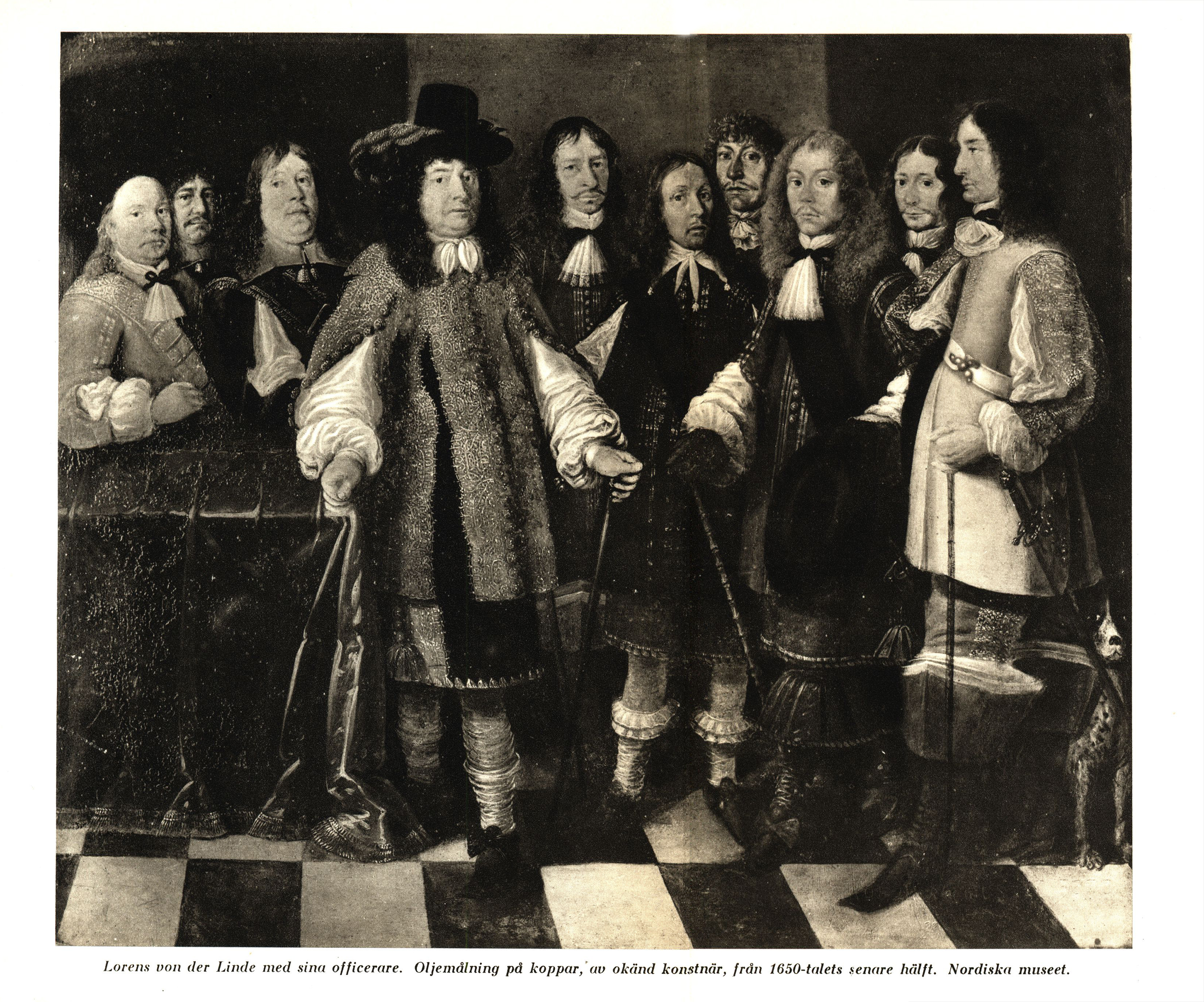
Linde with some of his officers, c. 1658

After Christina abdicated and her cousin Charles X Gustav of the House of Palatinate-Zweibrücken ascended the throne in 1654, Linde became a close confidant of the king. That year Linde shocked the English envoy Bulstrode Whitelocke with his stories about Charles' liaisons with German women. Charles sent Linde to Holstein to appraise Hedwig Eleonora of Holstein-Gottorp, whom he had selected as his queen; they married in October 1654. Linde's barony was one of those exempted from Charles' reduction of 1655; Charles wrote a letter personally confirming the exemption on 10 August that year and Linde retained the title for life.

Linde recruited a new regiment of foot and accompanied Charles on the Northern War of 1655–1660 against the Polish–Lithuanian Commonwealth. In December 1655, he was appointed to command fortresses in Pomerania and Prussia. In 1660, he succeeded Adolph John as commander of Swedish forces in Prussia. He found himself badly affected by the death of Charles in 1660 and soon after returned to Sweden. Linde was a supporter of Magnus Gabriel De la Gardie during factional debates in the Privy Council. In the war council Linde successfully advocated for reductions in the size of the army and for demolition of the fortresses in Pomerania. He was appointed lieutenant field marshal in 1658 and field marshal in 1665.

== Personal life ==
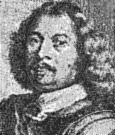
Lorens von der Linde from the 1906 Svenskt biografiskt lexikon

Linde never married and explained in a 1651 letter to Swedish nobleman Adolph John that he did not want to tie himself to a single woman: "my nature is to love freely, to laugh continuously". When former-Queen Christina visited Sweden in 1660, Linde was appointed to court her. Linde liked to draw and the Kalmar museum holds a portrait of Christina attributed to him.

Linde maintained a large inherited estate, Malmvik, in what is now the Ekerö Municipality of Stockholm County; in 1662 he entertained the widowed Hedwig Eleonora there. Another wave of reductions threatened Linde's barony in the mid-1660s, but a government order of January 1666 granted him an indefinite exemption. From the late 1660s Linde suffered from debilitating bouts of gout and other illnesses and was at times confined to his bed. By early 1670 he was unable to attend the war council, and he died on 25 June 1670 in Stockholm.

By the time of Linde's death most of the large fortune he inherited from his father was gone; his elder brother Jakob von der Linde had inherited the bulk of the estate. As he was childless the barony reverted to the crown, though a son of Jakob's, Gustav, was granted the barony and three-quarters of the estate in 1672. Lorens von der Linde was buried in a family tomb at Lovö in Medelpad; the tomb's construction was paid for out of Linde's estate and supervised by Balthasar Gyldenhoff who had married a daughter of Jakob, it was completed in 1671.
