= Jankov (Benešov District) =

- Municipality
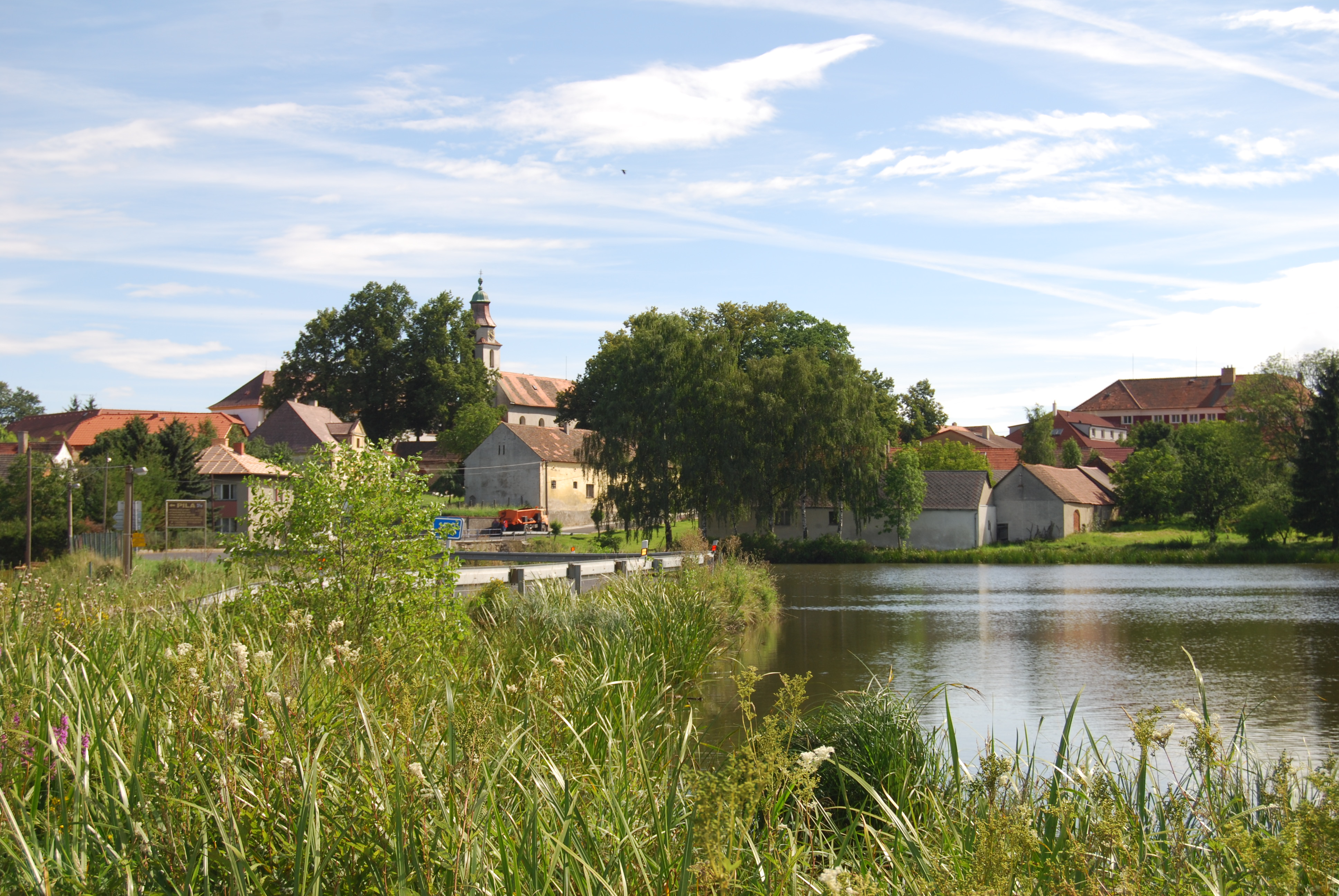
- A pond in Jankov

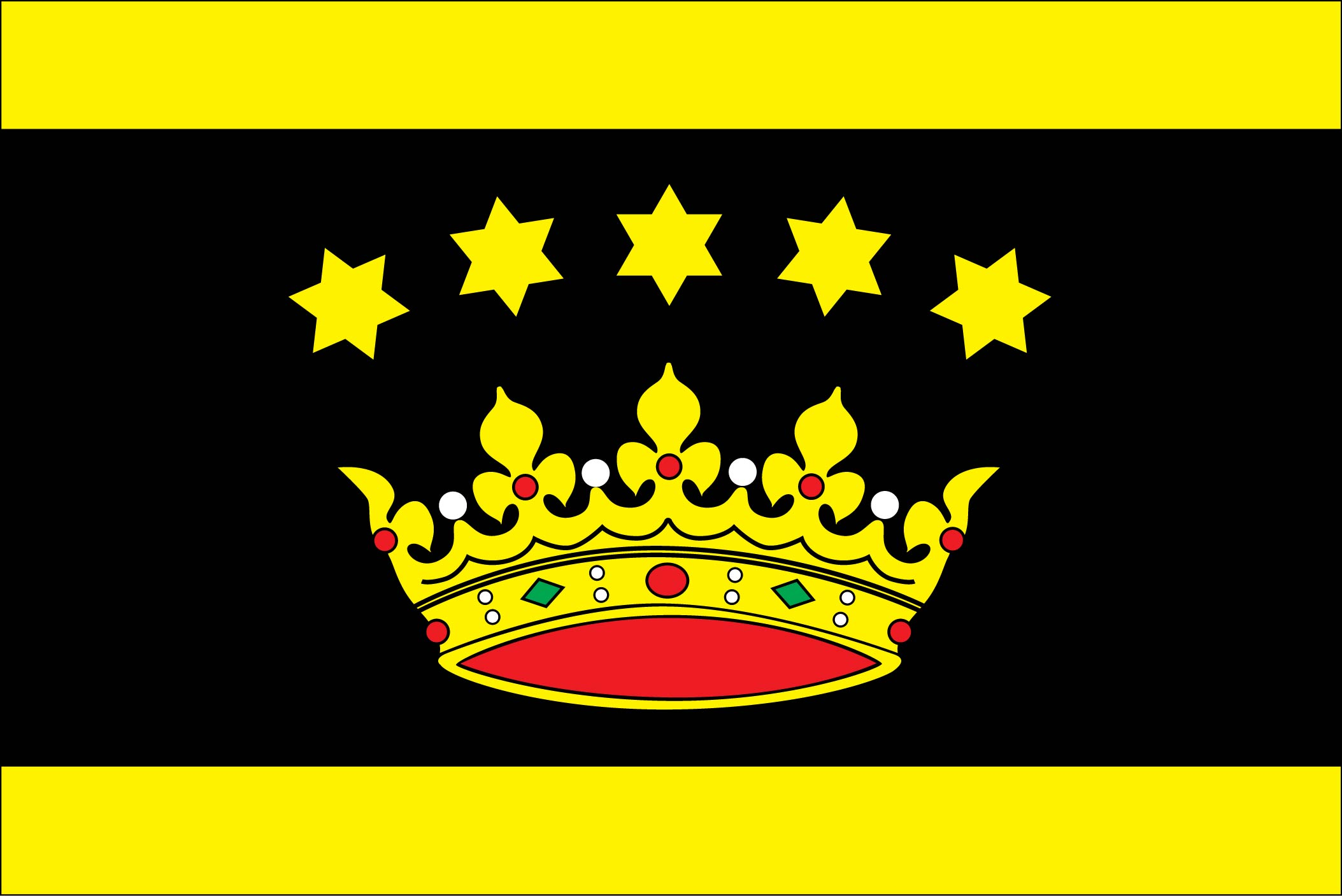
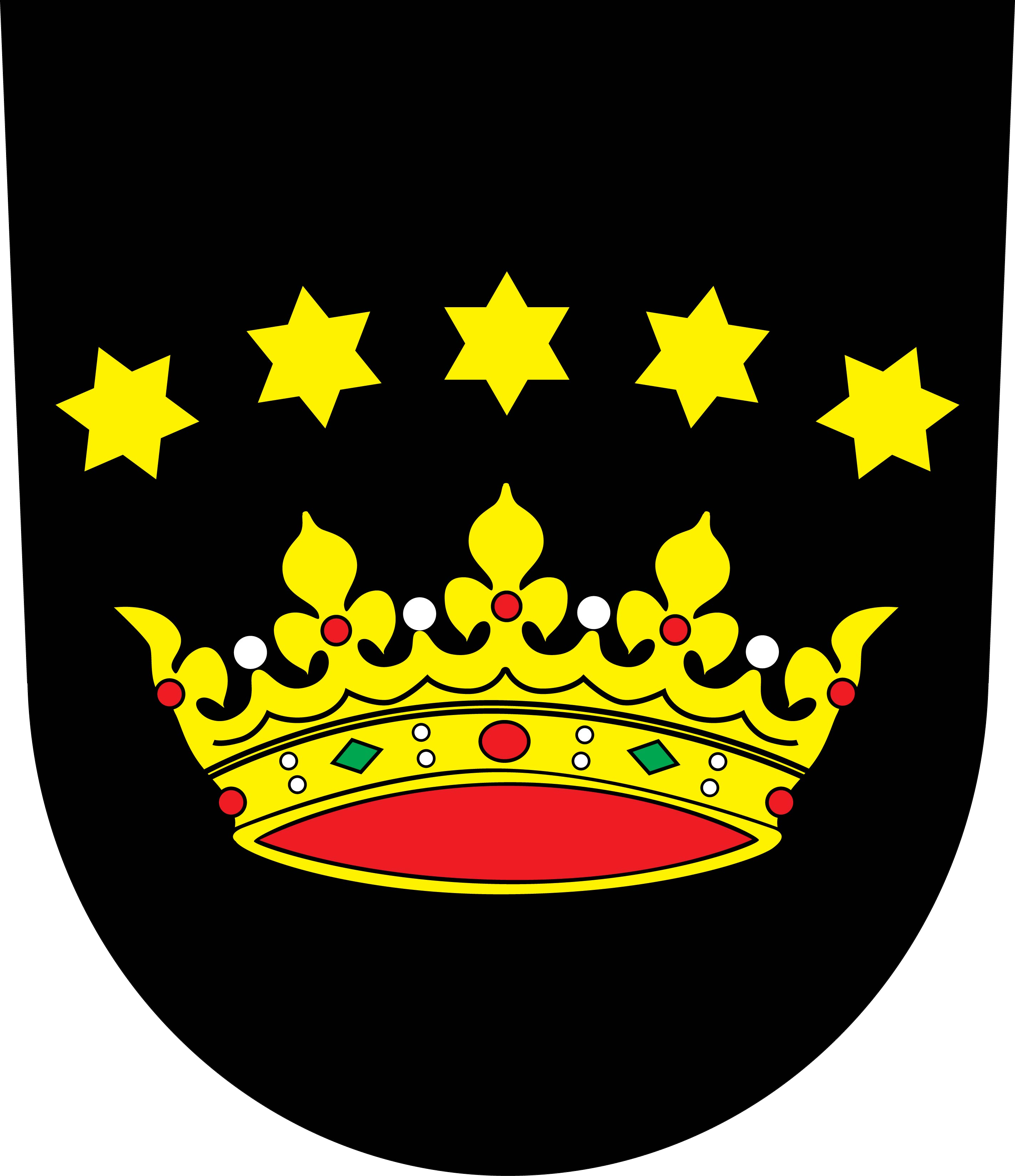
- Flag Coat of arms

- Location in the Czech Republic
- Coordinates: 49°39′11″N 14°43′51″E
- Country: Czech Republic
- Region: Central Bohemian
- District: Benešov
- First mentioned: 1352

Area
  - Total: 29.81 km^{2} (11.51 sq mi)
- Elevation: 510 m (1,670 ft)

Population (2026-01-01)
  - Total: 919
  - Density: 30.8/km^{2} (79.8/sq mi)
- Time zone: UTC+1 (CET)
  - Summer (DST): UTC+2 (CEST)
- Postal code: 257 03
- Website: obecjankov.cz

Jankov is a municipality and village in Benešov District in the Central Bohemian Region of the Czech Republic. It has about 900 inhabitants.

== Administrative division ==
Jankov consists of ten municipal parts (in brackets population according to the 2021 census):

- Jankov (478)
- Bedřichovice (42)
- Čečkov (17)
- Čestín (14)
- Jankovská Lhota (52)
- Nosákov (39)
- Odlochovice (179)
- Otradovice (30)
- Pičín (74)
- Podolí (8)

Čečkov, Nosákov and Odlochovice form an exclave of the municipal territory.

== Etymology ==
The name is derived from the personal name Janek (a diminutive of Jan), meaning "Janek's (court)".

== Geography ==
Jankov is located about 15 kilometres (9 mi) south of Benešov and 45 km (28 mi) southeast of Prague. It lies in the Vlašim Uplands. The highest point is at 675 m (2,215 ft) above sea level. The Chotýšanka River flows through the municipality. The area is rich in small fishponds.

== History ==
The first written mention of Jankov is from 1352. From 1418 to 1702, the village was owned by the Talmberk family. The last noble owners of Jankov before the establishment of an independent municipality in 1848 was the Chotek family.

The Battle of Jankau was fought nearby on 6 March 1645, during the Thirty Years' War. It featured a Swedish army under Lennart Torstensson and an Imperial force commanded by Melchior von Hatzfeld.

== Demographics ==
Historical population

Year	Pop.	±%
1869	2,076	—
1880	2,252	+8.5%
1890	2,322	+3.1%
1900	2,157	−7.1%
1910	1,983	−8.1%

Year	Pop.	±%
1921	1,885	−4.9%
1930	1,738	−7.8%
1950	1,305	−24.9%
1961	1,294	−0.8%
1970	1,130	−12.7%

Year	Pop.	±%
1980	943	−16.5%
1991	891	−5.5%
2001	893	+0.2%
2011	940	+5.3%
2021	933	−0.7%

Source: Censuses

== Transport ==
There are no railways or major roads passing through the municipality.

== Sights ==
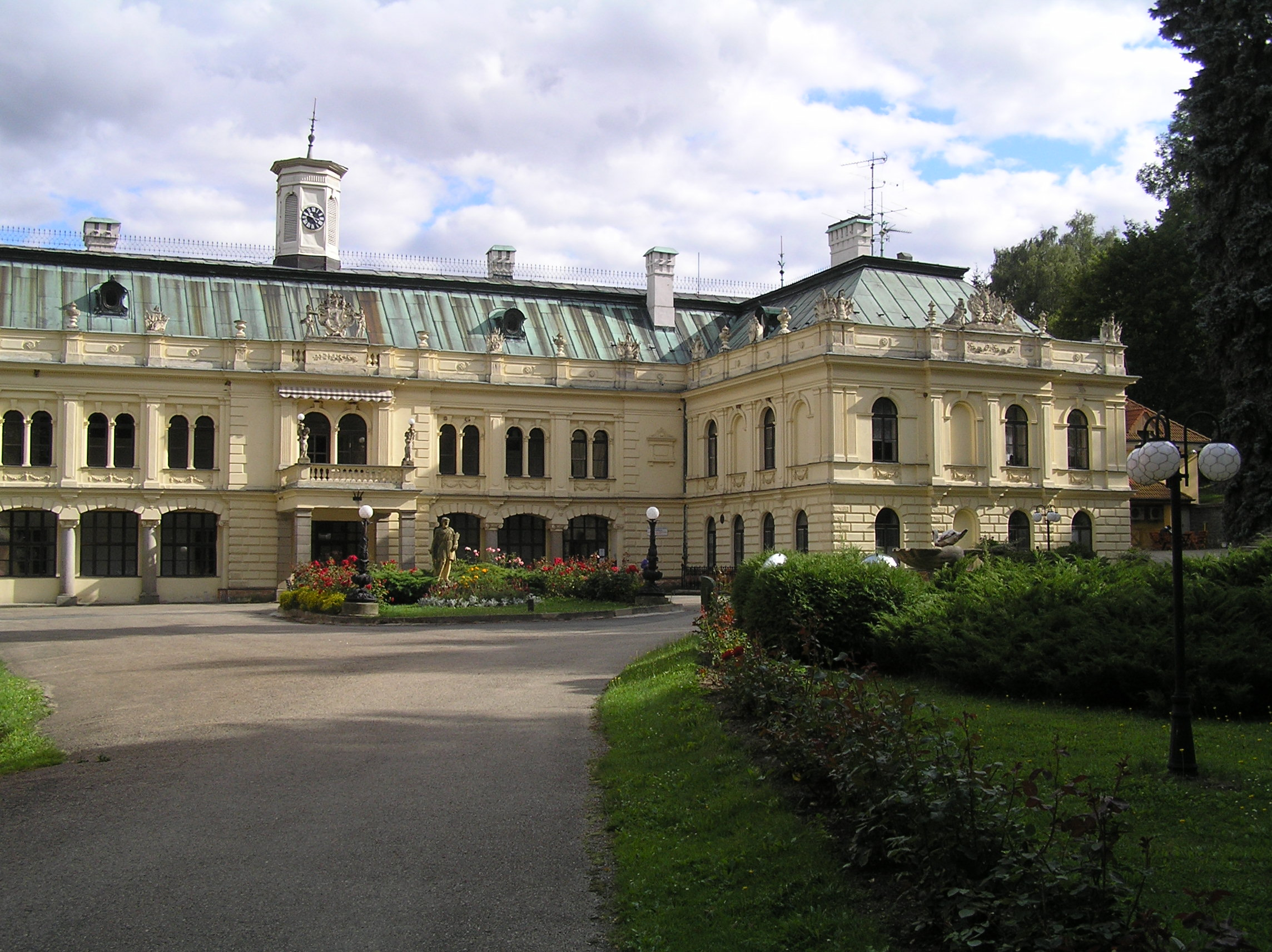
Odlochovice Castle

The main landmark of Jankov is the Church of Saint John the Baptist. It was built in the Romanesque style in the mid-12th century. In the 17th century, Baroque modifications were made.

The Church of Saint Lawrence is located in Bedřichovice. It is a Romanesque-Gothic building from the third quarter of the 13th century.

A notable building is the castle in Odlochovice. It was built in the Renaissance style on the site of an old Gothic fortress. Neorenaissance reconstruction took place at the end of the 19th century. Today it houses an institute of social care. A large castle park also belongs to the castle.
