= Battle of Jankau =

1645 battle of the Thirty Years' War

Coordinates: 49.6503°N 14.7294°E

- Part of the Thirty Years' War
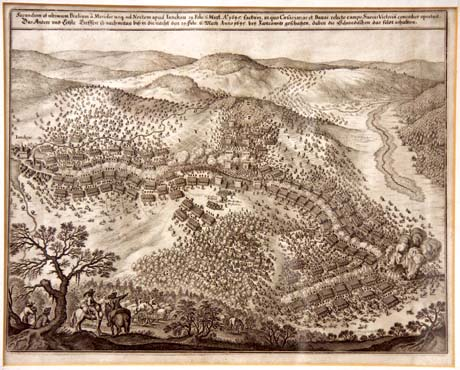
- Battle of Jankau, contemporary engraving
Date	6 March 1645
Location	Jankov, now the Czech Republic
Result	Swedish victory

Belligerents
(yes) Swedish Empire	Holy Roman Empire; Electorate of Bavaria

Commanders and leaders
Lennart Torstensson; Arvid Wittenberg de Potelles; Robert Douglas	Melchior von Hatzfeld (POW); Johann von Werth; Johann von Götzen †

Strength
16,000, 60 guns	16,000, 26 guns

Casualties and losses
3,000–4,000 killed or wounded	4,000 killed or wounded 4,573 captured, plus 26 guns

The Battle of Jankau, (Note: Also known as Jankov, Jankow, or Jankowitz) 6 March 1645, took place towards the end of the Thirty Years' War near Jankov, then in Bohemia, now the Czech Republic. A Swedish army of around 16,000 defeated an Imperial force of the same size.

Led by Lennart Torstensson, the Swedes effectively destroyed their opponents, commanded by Melchior von Hatzfeldt. However, the devastation caused by decades of conflict and lack of supplies meant they were unable to take advantage.

Imperial forces regained control of Bohemia in 1646, but inconclusive campaigns in the Rhineland and Saxony made it clear neither side had the strength to impose a military solution. Although fighting continued as participants tried to improve their positions, it increased the urgency of negotiations which culminated in the 1648 Peace of Westphalia.

== Background ==
The Thirty Years' War began in 1618 when the Bohemian Estates offered the Crown to fellow Protestant Frederick V of the Palatinate, rather than the Catholic Emperor Ferdinand II. Most members of the Holy Roman Empire remained neutral, and the Bohemian Revolt was quickly suppressed. Financed by Maximilian of Bavaria, an army of the Catholic League launched the Palatinate campaign, and sent Frederick into exile in the Dutch Republic.

Frederick's replacement by Maximilian as ruler and Prince-elector of the Palatinate changed the nature of the war, drawing in Protestant German states like Saxony and Brandenburg-Prussia, as well as external powers like Denmark–Norway. In 1630, Gustavus Adolphus of Sweden invaded Pomerania, partly to support his Protestant co-religionists, but also to control the Baltic trade, which provided much of Sweden's income.

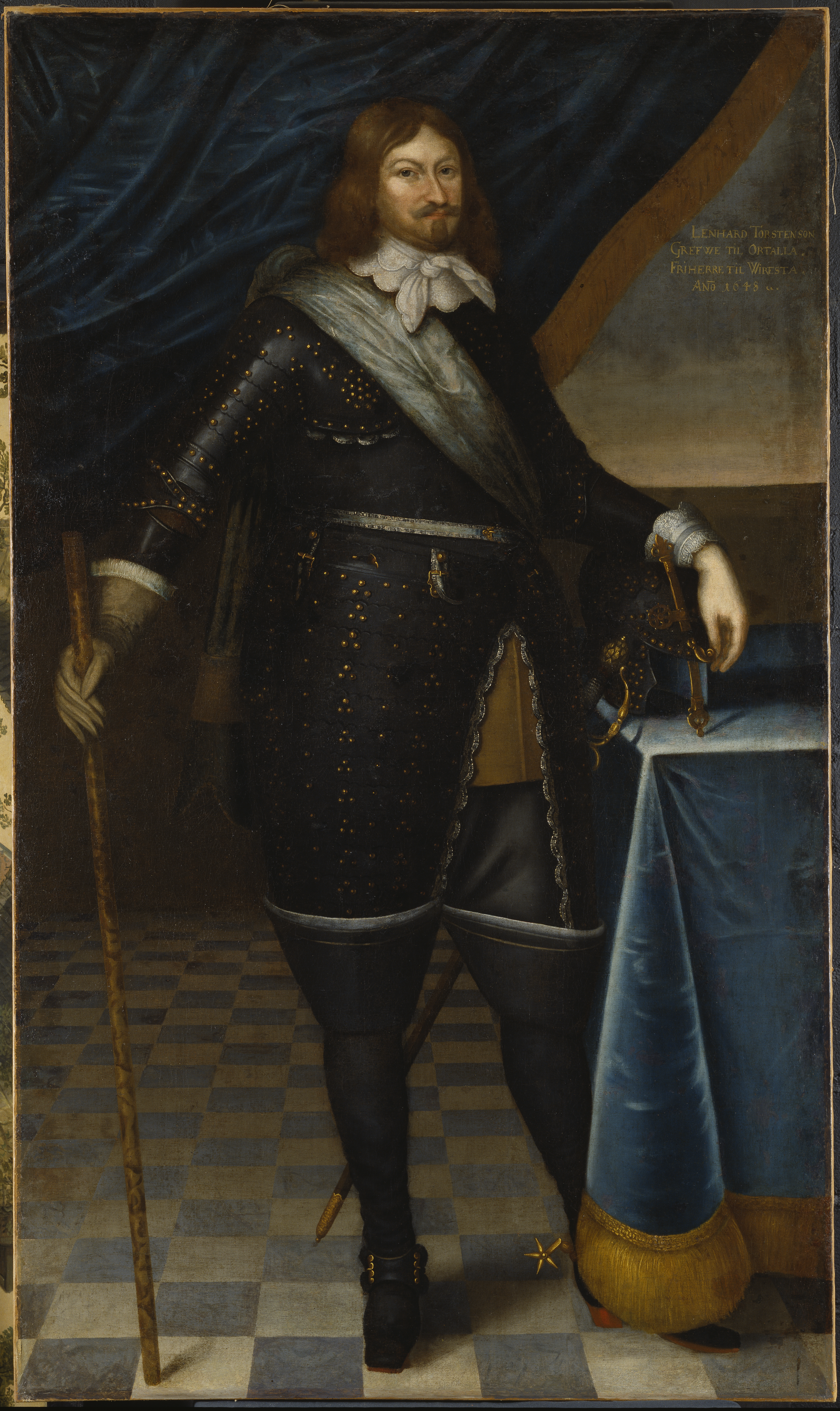
Swedish commander Lennart Torstensson

Swedish intervention continued despite the death of Gustavus at Lützen in November 1632, but their objectives conflicted with both Imperial states like Saxony, and their regional rivals, such as Denmark. Most of Sweden's Protestant German allies made peace with Emperor Ferdinand II in the 1635 Treaty of Prague. As a result, the war lost much of its religious nature, and became into a contest between the Empire and Sweden, who was supported by France, and George Rákóczi, Prince of Transylvania.

Emperor Ferdinand III, who succeeded his father in 1637, initiated peace talks in 1643, then delayed negotiations, hoping his position would improve after a planned 1644 military offensive. However, the Swedes first defeated the Danes, who had re-entered the war as an Imperial ally, then destroyed an Imperial army in Saxony. Despite victory at Freiburg in August, the Bavarians under Franz von Mercy could not prevent French troops capturing Philippsburg, and occupying Lorraine. Mercy withdrew into Franconia, establishing winter quarters at Heilbronn.

For 1645, Swedish commander Lennart Torstensson proposed a three-part offensive, intended to compel Ferdinand III to agree terms. It envisaged three simultaneous attacks, in order to prevent Imperial forces from supporting each other. While France attacked Bavaria, Torstensson would lead his army into Bohemia; they would be joined here by Rákóczi, and their combined force would then move against the Imperial capital, Vienna. While roughly equal in numbers, the Swedish army in Bohemia was far better integrated, and despite poor health, Torstensson was an energetic and experienced general, with capable officers. Although his opponent Melchior von Hatzfeldt was a competent tactical leader, he was unable to control his subordinates, Johann von Götzen, and Johann von Werth. In addition, many of his troops were poorly equipped remnants from defeated armies, his best unit being 5,000 veteran Bavarian cavalry under von Werth.

== Battle ==
Bohemia and Moravia, 1645 campaign; lines of march usually followed rivers, essential for carrying supplies

In late January, Torstensson took advantage of the frozen ground to enter Bohemia, near Chomutov. The Imperial army had established winter quarters near Plzeň; unsure of Swedish intentions, von Hatzfeldt held his position to protect Prague. On 18 February, the Swedes passed 18 kilometres (11 mi) to the west, and the two sides spent the next three weeks tracking each other along either side of the Vltava river. In early March, a sudden freeze allowed Torstensson to cross near Staré Sedlo. Hatzfeldt followed, reaching Tábor on 4 March, where he made contact with Swedish cavalry. On 5 March, he withdrew to the hills around Jankov, and prepared for battle the next day.

Hatzfeldt selected a strong position; the hills and woods negated the superior Swedish artillery, his centre was protected by a stream, the right by a steep slope and deep forest. His left was the most vulnerable, with open ground directly to its front, overlooked by a hill to the south, known as 'Kappellhodjen' or Chapel Hill. In a conference the night before, Torstensson and his senior officers recognised the drawbacks, but agreed to an assault; their coordinated attack contrasted with command failures among the Imperial generals.

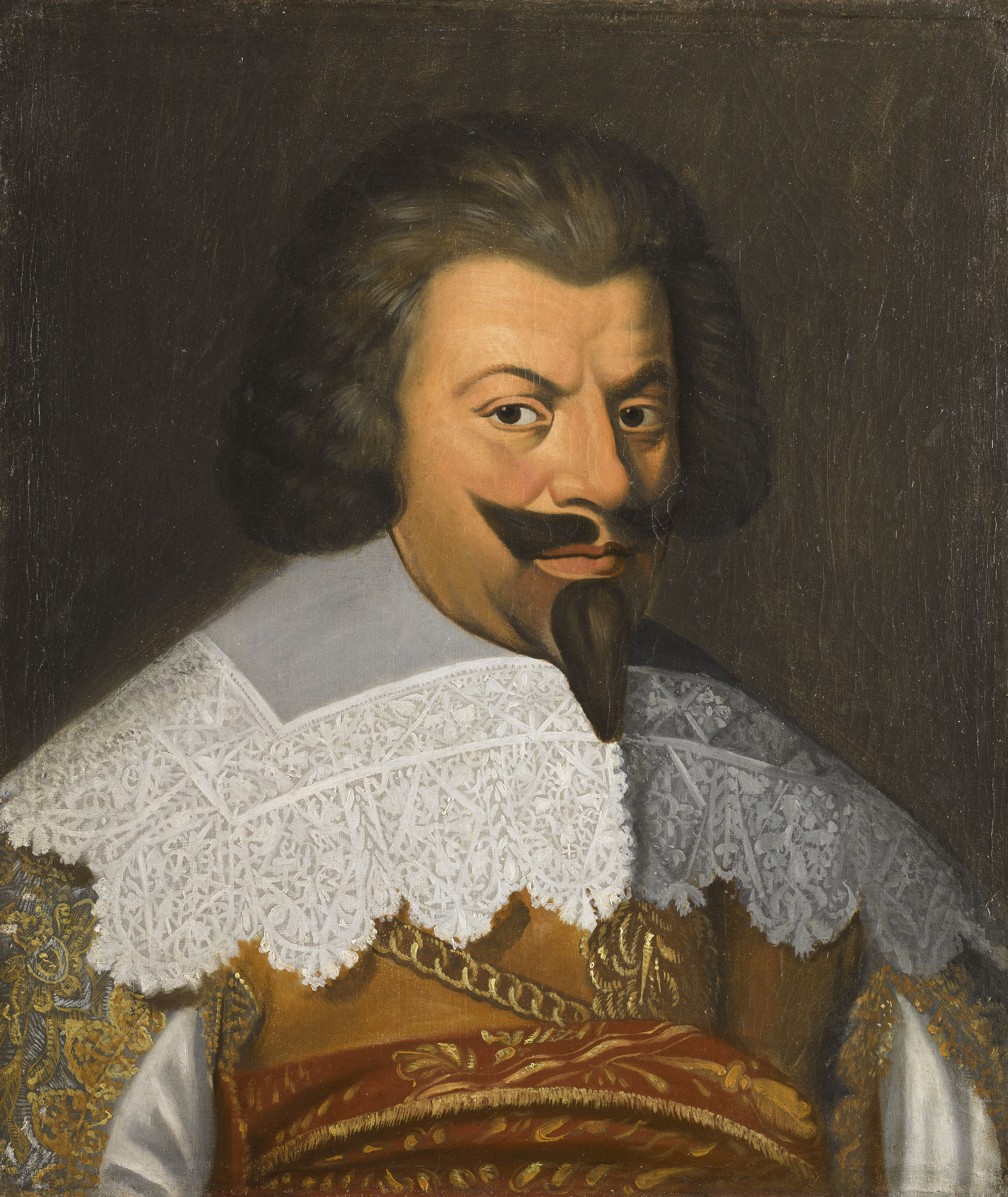
Bavarian cavalry general Werth, whose charges nearly succeeded in preventing defeat

The battle consisted of two phases, the first from dawn to midday, the second from early afternoon until nightfall. Around 6:00 am, a Swedish column under Robert Douglas feinted against the Imperial right, while their main force moved around their left. After ordering Götzen to post a detachment on Chapel Hill, Hatzfeldt set off to assess Douglas' move, which he correctly deduced was a diversion. On his return, he discovered Götzen had misinterpreted his orders, and moved his entire force towards the hill, where it became stuck in the woods and broken ground, giving the Swedes time to move up artillery and infantry. After a furious argument, Götzen launched a series of attacks, which were repulsed with heavy loss. Just after 9:15 am, he was killed, and his troops withdrew.

Hatzfeldt moved reinforcements from the centre to cover their retreat, but unlike the lighter Swedish guns, the Imperial artillery got stuck in the mud, and was captured by Arvid Wittenberg. Cavalry charges led by Werth kept the Swedes at a safe distance, and the two armies broke contact just before midday. Having cleared the road to Olomouc, Torstensson decided to allow the Imperial army to withdraw, hoping to reorganise his exhausted troops prior to setting off.

However, Hatzfeldt felt the Swedes were too close for him to retreat in safety, and opted to hold his position until nightfall. Seeing this, Torstensson moved his guns forward, firing at close range into the helpless Imperial infantry. Werth charged and scattered the Swedish right, before his cavalry stopped to loot the baggage train, where they captured Torstensson's wife. The Swedish cavalry reformed and counter-attacked, inflicting heavy casualties, with only 1,500 of the 5,000 Bavarians making it back to Munich. The Imperial infantry surrendered, some 4,450 men being taken prisoner, including Hatzfeldt, with another 4,000 killed or wounded. From the 36 regiments that fought at Jankau, only 2,697 men were present in Prague a week later, with another 2,000 left scattered in Moravia. Swedish losses totalled between 3,000 and 4,000 killed or wounded.

== Aftermath ==
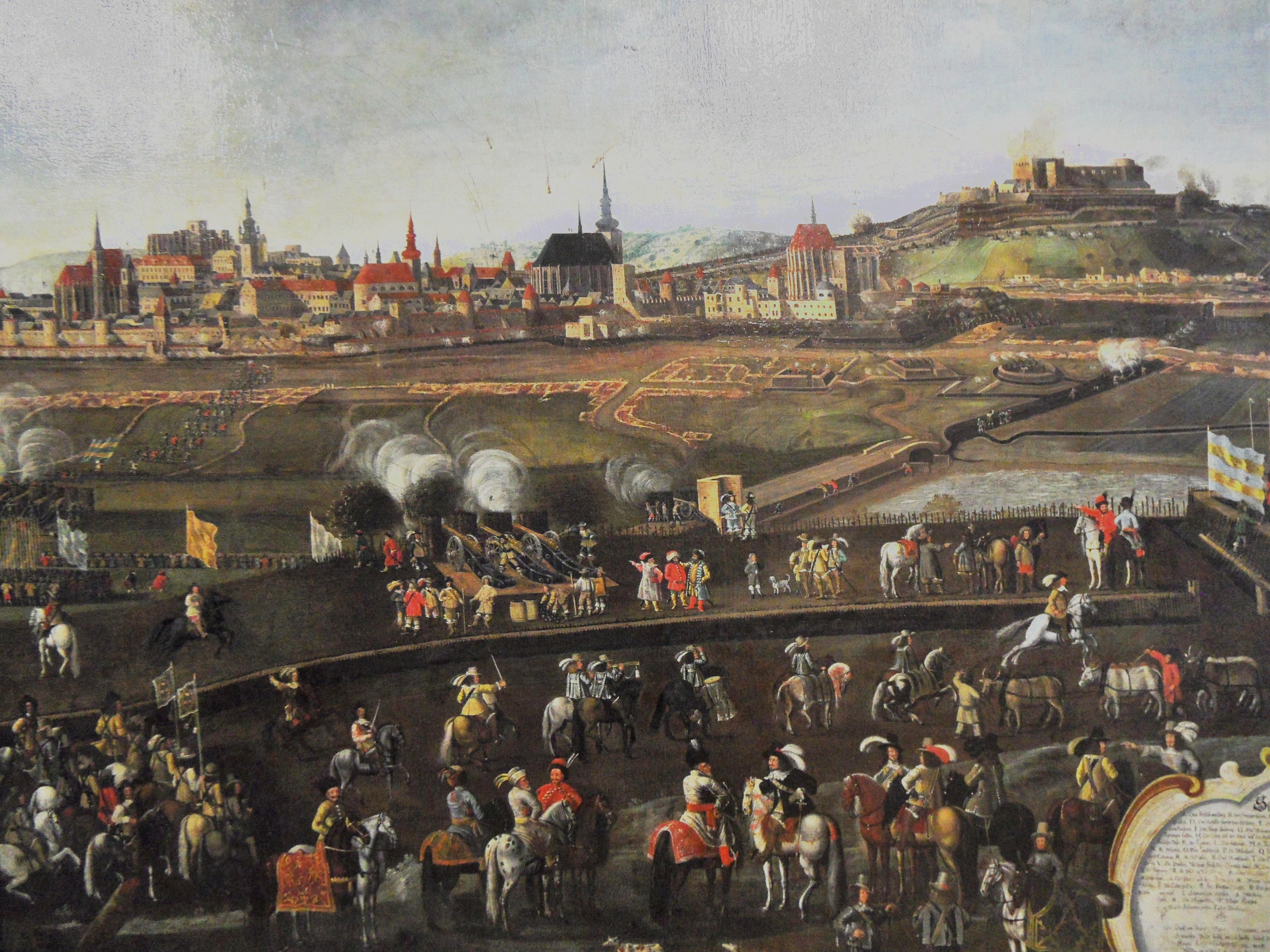
The failed siege of Brno in 1645 forced Torstensson to retreat

By early May, Ferdinand and his brother Archduke Leopold had assembled another army of some 15,000 men. Although it could not match the Swedish veterans, 25 years of constant war had devastated the countryside, forcing all sides to spend more time foraging than fighting, and drastically reducing their ability to sustain campaigns.

Lack of options meant Torstensson instead attacked Brno, which had an Imperial garrison of 1,500 under the Huguenot exile, de Souches. He was joined by thousands of Transylvanian irregulars, whose presence simply worsened the supply issues, the besiegers ultimately losing over 8,000 men from disease, hunger, and desertion. The opening of the Cretan War meant the Ottomans withdrew support from Rákóczi in return for Ferdinand renewing the Peace of Zsitvatorok. This ended the Transylvanian revolt and the siege of Brno.

The conclusion of the Torstenson War encouraged Torstensson to make one last attempt on Vienna, but by October he had fewer than 10,000 men. After retreating into Saxony, he relinquished command to Wrangel on 23 December and by February 1646, the Swedes had been expelled from Bohemia.

However, Ferdinand could not support his allies in Bavaria and Saxony. While the French campaign in Bavaria ended in stalemate, Torstensson's three-part strategy finally proved its worth when Königsmarck advanced into Saxony. Without hope of reinforcement, Elector John George agreed a six-month truce in September 1645. Accepting a military solution was no longer possible, Ferdinand instructed his representatives at Westphalia to begin serious negotiations.

== Sources ==
- Guthrie, William P (2003). The Later Thirty Years War : From the Battle of Wittstock to the Treaty of Westphalia. ABC-CLIO.
- Höbelt, Lothar (2012). Afflerbach, Holger; Strachan, Hew (eds.). Surrender in the Thirty Years War in How Fighting Ends: A History of Surrender. OUP. ISBN 978-0199693627.
- Hötte, Hans; Mihalik, Béla Vilmos (1867). Heywood, Colin (ed.). Atlas of Southeast Europe: Geopolitics and History; Volume One: 1521-1699 (2016 ed.). Brill.
- Setton, Kenneth Meyer (1991). Venice, Austria, and the Turks in the Seventeenth Century. American Philosophical Society. ISBN 978-0871691927.
- Spielvogel, Jackson (2006). Western Civilization (2014 ed.). Wadsworth Publishing. ISBN 978-1285436401.
- Wedgwood, CV (2005). The Thirty Years War. New York Review of Books. ISBN 978-1590171462.
- Wilson, Peter (2009). Europe's Tragedy: A History of the Thirty Years War. Allen Lane. ISBN 978-0713995923.
- Wolke, Lars Ericson (2003). "Trettioåriga krigets vändpunkt: Jankow 1645" [Turning point of the Thirty Years' War: Jankow 1645]. Svenska slagfält (in Swedish). Wahlström & Widstrand: 173–181. ISBN 978-9146202257.
