= Siege of Toruń =

Siege of Toruń or Siege of Thorn can refer to:

- Siege of Toruń (1658)
- Siege of Toruń (1703)
- Siege of Toruń (1809)
