= Staré Sedlo =

Staré Sedlo may refer to places in the Czech Republic:

- Staré Sedlo (Sokolov District) a municipality and village in the Karlovy Vary Region
- Staré Sedlo (Tachov District), a municipality and village in the Plzeň Region
- Staré Sedlo, a village and part of Orlík nad Vltavou in the South Bohemian Region
- Staré Sedlo, a village and part of Stádlec in the South Bohemian Region
- Staré Sedlo, a village and part of Teplá in the Karlovy Vary Region
