= Swedish invasion of Fehmarn =

Part of the Torstenson War

- Part of the Torstenson War
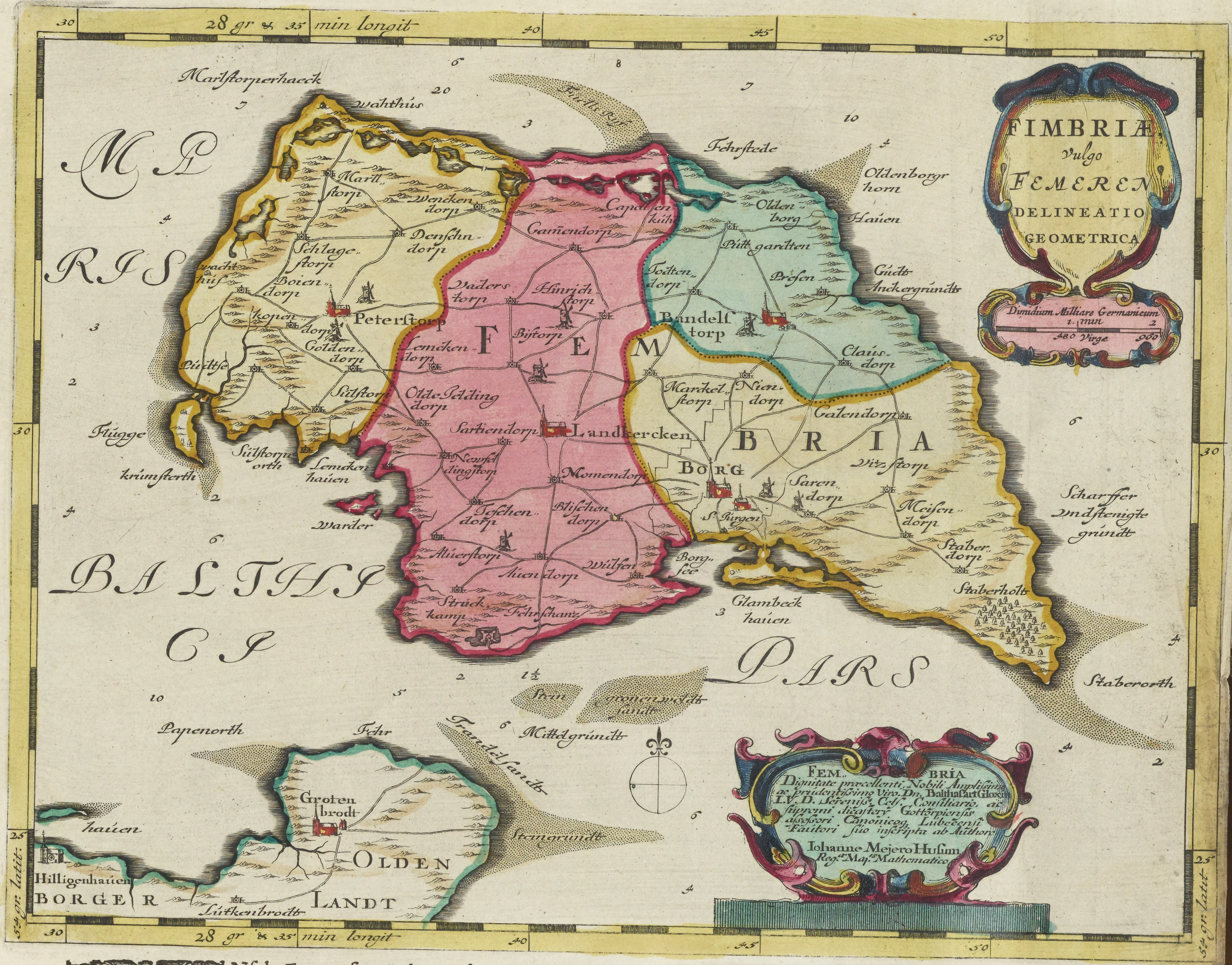
- Geometrical map of Fehmarn by Johannes Meyer, 1665
Date	29–30 June 1644 (O.S.); 9–10 July 1644 (N.S.)
Location	Fehmarn, Denmark–Norway (present-day Germany) 54.4454°N 11.1702°E
Result	Swedish victory
Territorial changes	Fehmarn is captured by Swedish forces

Belligerents
(yes) Swedish Empire	Denmark–Norway

Commanders and leaders
(yes) Lennart Torstensson (yes) Richard Clerck (yes) Kaspar Mortaigne	David Uckermann †; Jürgen Bünger

Units involved
(yes) Kattan (yes) Falken (yes) Smålands Lejon	Fehmarn militia

Strength
At least 500–600 men 34 ships (Note: The entire Swedish fleet partook in facilitating the landing, though only three warships provided effective covering fire for the Swedish troops.)	Unknown

Casualties and losses
4 killed Some wounded	≥400 captured 100–200 killed Several guns captured

The Swedish invasion of Fehmarn (Note: Also called the conquest of Fehmarn.) occurred from 29 to 30 June or 9 to 10 July 1644 (Note: 29–30 June 1644 (O.S.) 9–10 July 1644 (N.S.)) during the Torstenson War between Denmark and Sweden.

Upon the Swedish fleet reaching Christianspris on 20 June, deliberations regarding a Swedish attack on Funen began between Admiral Clas Fleming and Field Marshal Lennart Torstensson on 24 June. Due to a lack of transport vessels for such an attack, they decided to attack Fehmarn instead.

With at least 500 to 600 men and the entire Swedish fleet, the Swedes anchored off the island on 29 June / 9 July. Bombardment of the Danish defenses from the main Swedish fleet was ineffective, though fire from the ships Kattan, Falken, and Smålands Lejon caused significant damage. Armed boats, of which twelve were armed with three or six-pounder guns, began approaching the shore. The Danes, who had gathered in large numbers on the beach to meet the landing Swedes, were dispersed by fire from the boats.

Following a brief skirmish, the Danes retreated inland or to their fortifications. Brief resistance was also carried out by a peasant militia, but was quickly defeated. The following day, Kaspar Mortaigne landed with the Swedish cavalry and captured the rest of the island.

== Background ==
On 13 December 1643, after months of preparation by Axel Oxenstierna, a Swedish army of 16,000 men invaded Holstein under the command of Lennart Torstensson. The invasion sparked the eponymous Torstenson War between Denmark and Sweden.

On 17 May 1644, Torstensson received a report that an Imperial army led by Matthias Gallas was marching down the Havel, with the intention of continuing to Mecklenburg and Western Pomerania. As a result, Axel Oxenstierna argued against an attack on the Danish islands and instead recommended that Lennart Torstensson focus on Matthias Gallas.

On 30 May, instructions from the Swedish government were finalized and issued to Admiral Clas Fleming, concerning the deployment of the Swedish fleet in support of ongoing military operations. Initially ordered to assemble 39 warships, four fireships, and six transport vessels, he was only able to assemble 34 ships.

On 1 June, the Swedish fleet set out from Dalarö, reaching Christianspris by 20 June.

=== Prelude ===
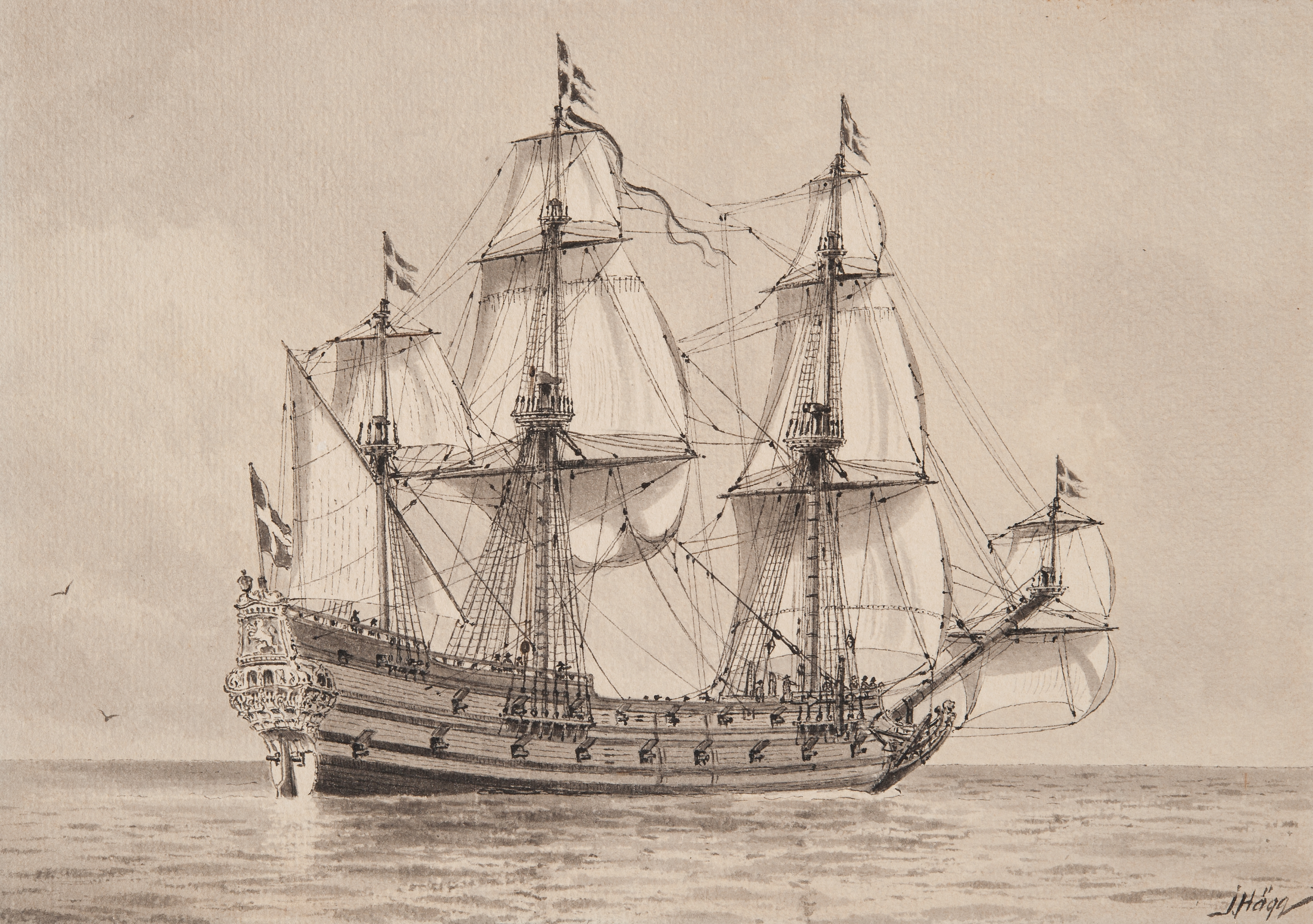
Depiction of Smålands Lejon by Jacob Hägg, 1900

On 24 June, discussions between Fleming and Torstensson continued in Christianspris, with Torstensson having inspected the instructions given to Fleming the previous day. Despite wishing to attack Funen, the Swedes lacked transport vessels to carry it out. Instead, they decided to capture the island of Fehmarn, so as not to remain idle.

Preparations were underway by 25 and 26 June, with the entire Swedish fleet to take part. The Swedes converted one small old ship and four fireships, along with seizing every sloop and large boat they could find to allow for the transportation of around 500 horses to Fehmarn. On 27 June, 200 or 300 cavalry and 100 dragoons boarded the prepared vessels. The Swedes also decided to use their launches for transport. Twelve of the launches were armed, either with three or six-pounder guns, which would be followed by the unarmed ones.

The three warships Falken, Kattan, and Smålands Lejon were assigned to cover the Swedish landing, and were to anchor off the shore while the rest of the fleet anchored further away, where the water was 30 or 36 feet deep. (Note: Converted from five to six fathoms.) In the evening of 28 June, an additional 200 musketeers from Torstensson's Life Regiment boarded the vessels.

== Invasion ==
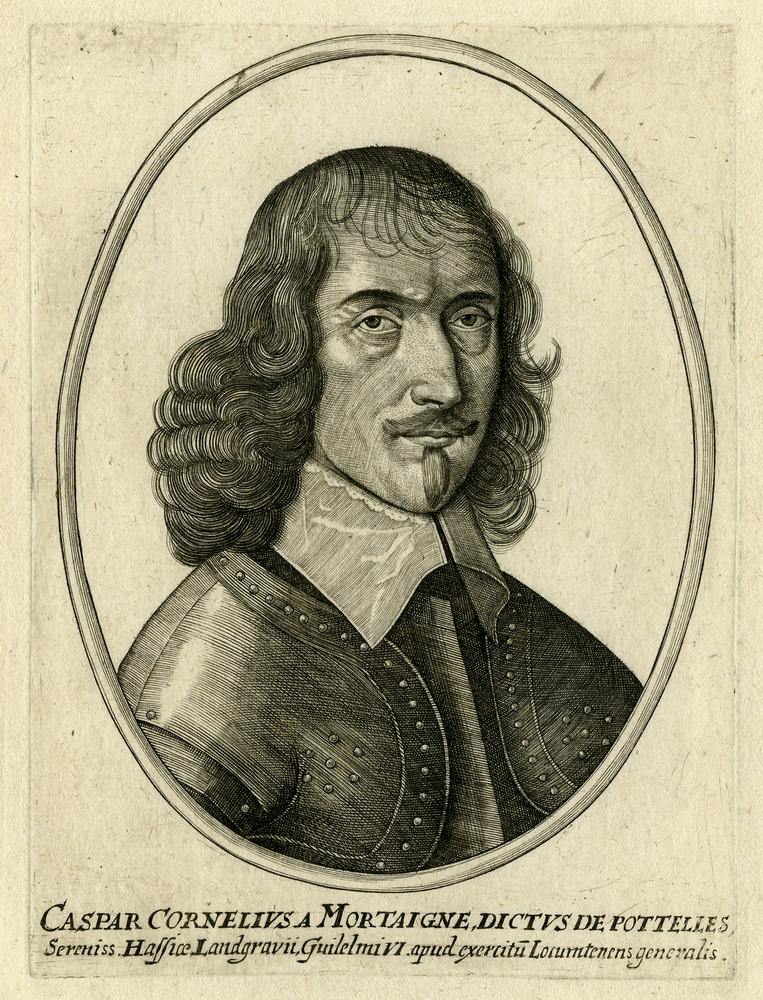
17th-century anonymous engraving of Mortaigne

On 29 June, the Swedish fleet anchored off Fehmarn. Following reconnaissance carried out by Torstensson, it was revealed that the Danish commander on the island was well prepared and had garrisoned previously constructed redoubts, breastworks, and other fortifications with German mercenaries and peasants. Bombardment from the main fleet was ineffective, as the fleet was too far away. However, the covering fire from Kattan, Smålands Lejon, and Falken caused considerable damage.

By 7 p.m., the Swedes decided to land on the island. The crews on the armed boats were reinforced from the main fleet, and all twelve began rowing toward the shore. The boats were commanded by Richard Clerck. Wishing to attack and overwhelm the landing Swedes, the Danes abandoned their fortifications and rushed toward the beach. As the boats had not fired on the Danes, and there was an approaching dusk, the Danes probably did not notice the guns onboard them.

Upon reaching the beach in large numbers, the Danes were dispersed as the armed boats fired on them. Having landed, a brief skirmish broke out between the Swedes and Danes. However, the Danes soon retreated toward either the fortifications or inland. Many of the fleeing Danes were killed, with the peasants suffering especially heavy losses. Nearby fortifications were soon captured by the Swedes, along with several guns and two banners.

Organized resistance against the Swedes was carried out by the local militia, led by David Uckermann and Jürgen Bünger, at the start of the invasion. However, they were quickly defeated, suffering 73 or 75 killed, including Uckermann.

Once ashore with the cavalry the following day, Kaspar Mortaigne pursued the Danes, capturing the fortifications further inland along with the entire island.

== Aftermath ==
Following the collapse of any remaining resistance, the Swedes began pillaging the countryside. According to Conrad Schmalfeldt, to end the pillaging, 20,000 thalers and 1,000 barrels of wheat were paid as tribute to the Swedes by the bailiffs in Gottorp and the local clergy. However, an anonymous source instead attested that it actually amounted to 52,000 thalers and 155 lasts of corn (3,720 barrels).

=== Losses ===
Exact Danish casualties during the invasion are disputed. According to a contemporary letter from Hans Andersson Appelboom to Hugo Grotius from 18 July 1644, the Danes suffered 200 killed and 400 captured. However, another contemporary letter from 6 July, sent by Conrad Schmalfeldt, claimed that more than 400 were captured and that more than 100 were killed. According to Swedish historian Arnold Munthe, 200 German mercenary troops were also compelled to enter Swedish service. By comparison, Swedish casualties were insignificant, consisting of some wounded, including Lieutenant Colonel Willem Philip. Additionally, four men from Torstensson's Life Regiment were killed.

== See also ==
- Danish reconquest of Rømø – Part of the Torstenson War
