= Jean-Louis Raduit de Souches =

Austrian marshall

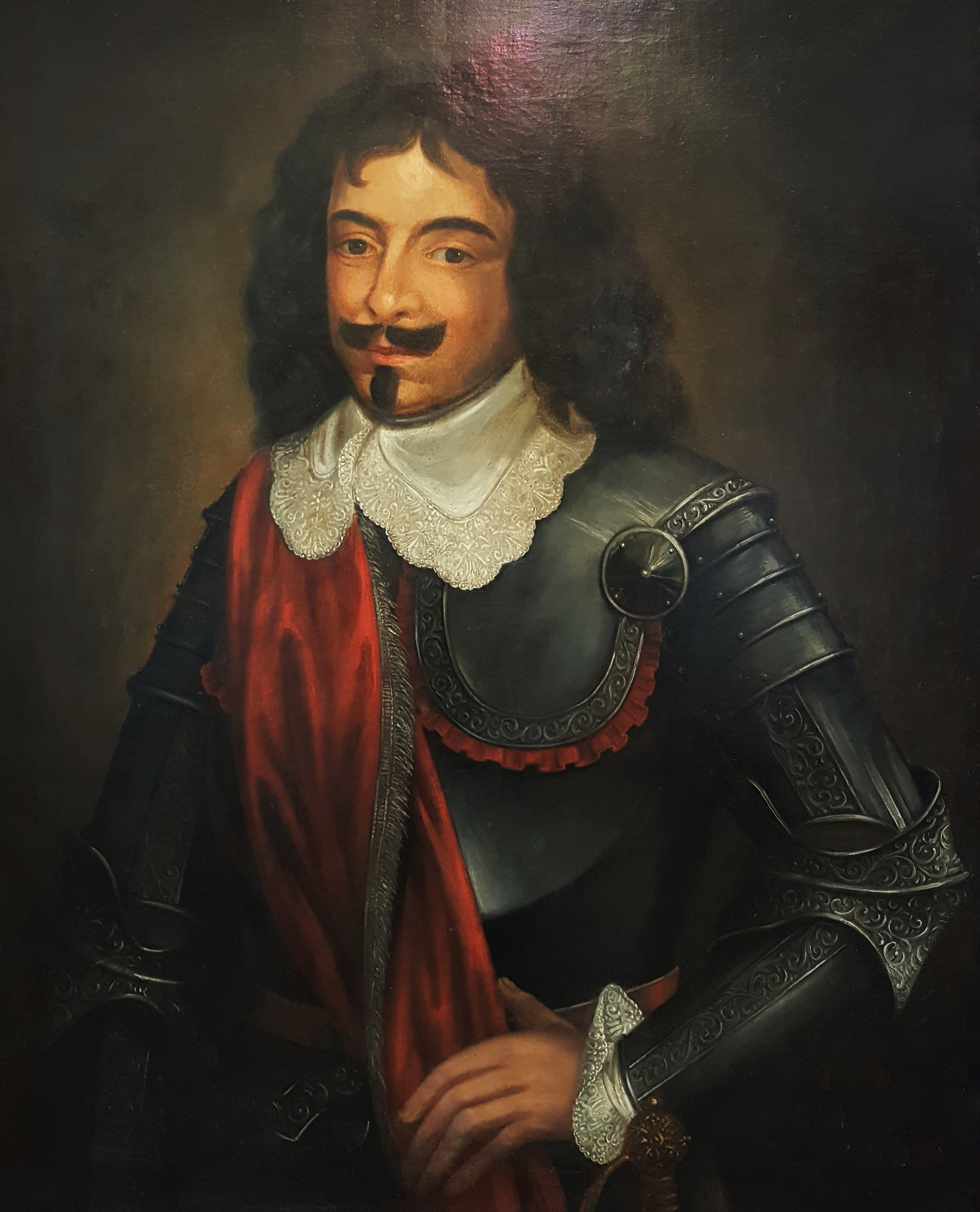
- Jean-Louis Raduit de Souches (unknown artist)

Commander, Imperial Army in Flanders
- In office 1673–1674

Governor of Komárom
- In office 1664–1682

Governor of Špilberk Castle
- In office 1648–1663
- Monarch: Leopold I, Holy Roman Emperor

Military commander of Brno
- In office 1645–1646
- Monarch: Ferdinand III, Holy Roman Emperor

Personal details
- Born: 16 August 1608 La Rochelle, France
- Died: 11 August 1682 (aged 73) Jevišovice, Moravia
- Resting place: Church of St. James (Brno)
- Occupation: Soldier and landowner

Military service
- Allegiance: Swedish Empire 1629-1642; Habsburg monarchy
- Rank: Field Marshal
- Battles/wars: Huguenot rebellions; Siege of La Rochelle; Thirty Years War; Defence of Stargard; Siege of Olomouc; Siege of Brno; Siege of Jihlava; Second Northern War; Siege of Kraków; Siege of Toruń; Siege of Demmin; Siege of Stettin (1659); Austro-Turkish War (1663–1664); Battle of Levice; Franco-Dutch War; Battle of Seneffe

Jean-Louis Raduit de Souches (16 August 1608 to 12 August 1682), (Note: Often referred to in Imperial documents as Ludwig de Souches) was a French-born professional soldier, who served in the Swedish and Imperial armies. A capable officer who reached the rank of Field Marshal, his career was marred by a tendency to quarrel with his colleagues and superiors.

Born into a family of minor French Protestant nobility, de Souches went into exile after the Siege of La Rochelle in 1629. He served in the Swedish army when it entered the Thirty Years' War against Emperor Ferdinand III, and by 1642 was colonel of an infantry regiment. However, he fell out with his superior officer and switched sides, joining the Imperial army.

His successful defence of Brno in 1645 established his reputation, and he was promoted Field Marshal in 1664. When Emperor Leopold joined the Franco-Dutch War in 1673, de Souches was appointed commander of Imperial forces in the Low Countries. A poor relationship with their Dutch and Spanish allies led to his removal in December 1674, ending his military career.

De Souches retired to his estates in at Jevišovice in Moravia, where he died on 12 August 1682 and was buried in the Church of St. James (Brno).

== Personal details ==
Jean-Louis Raduit de Souches was born on 16 August 1608, son of Jean Ratuit, Sieur de Barres (died 1614), and his wife Marguerite de Bourdigalea (died after 1636). Both parents were members of the Huguenot nobility, originally from Aunis, who owned property in the Protestant stronghold of La Rochelle. His elder brother was killed serving with the French army in 1636, while he also had a sister, Marguerite (died 1654).

His first wife Anna Elisabeth de Hoffkirchen died in 1663; they had two sons, Jean Louis (died 1717) and Charles Louis (1645–1691), who both served in the Imperial Army, and two daughters, Anna Dorotha (1652–1724) and Eleonora. Anna Salome Aspermont-Reckheim (1648–1729) became his second wife in 1677; they had no surviving children.

== Career ==
=== Thirty Years War ===
Souches began his military career during the siege of La Rochelle, part of the 1627 to 1629 Huguenot rebellions against Louis XIII. When the town surrendered in October 1628, he went into exile in Protestant Sweden, where he joined the army led by Gustavus Adolphus which entered the Thirty Years War in 1630. By 1636, he was captain in an infantry regiment which unsuccessfully defended Stargard against an Imperial force; he narrowly escaped court martial after accusing his commanding officer of negligence. This was symptomatic of a quarrelsome tendency which followed him throughout his career.

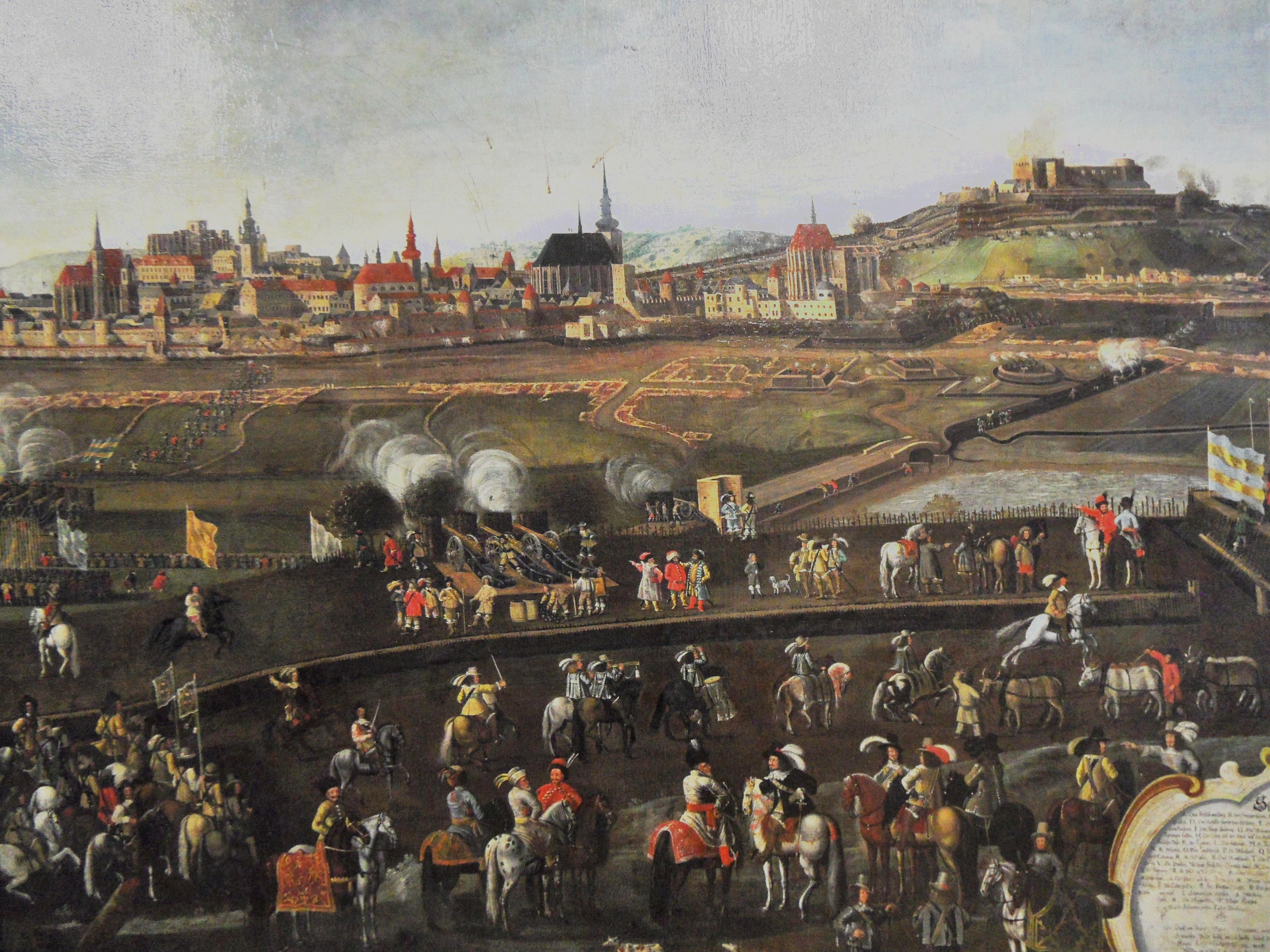
Siege of Brno 1645; de Souches established his reputation with his successful defence

In May 1636, France entered the Thirty Years War in alliance with Sweden, creating vacancies for experienced officers like de Souches. Unable to obtain a satisfactory position, he returned to Sweden in August 1639, where he was promoted colonel in early 1640. However, he later resigned from the Swedish army after a dispute with his superior, Torsten Stålhandske, and in late 1642 became a colonel in the Imperial army.

Over the next two years, de Souches took part in the 1643 invasion of Pomerania and an attack on the Swedish-held city of Olomouc in Moravia. Although unsuccessful, he was given command of defending Brno in May 1645 against Lennart Torstensson, and after a lengthy siege, the Swedes retreated in August having lost 8,000 men. His defence prevented an attack on Vienna, and thus helped speed up peace negotiations at Westphalia.

De Souches was rewarded with promotion to the rank of general, and granted lands outside Brno. When the war ended in 1648, he supervised the withdrawal of Swedish troops from Moravia, and was made Governor of Špilberk Castle. In 1649, he was elevated to the Moravian nobility on condition he converted to Catholicism within the next three years.

=== Later career ===
In 1654, Sweden attacked the Polish–Lithuanian Commonwealth, initiating the Second Northern War. When the fighting expanded to include Brandenburg-Prussia in 1657, Austria joined the anti-Swedish coalition. With de Souches in charge of the infantry, an army under Melchior von Hatzfeldt was sent to support Poland and helped recapture Kraków in August 1657. De Souches later commanded the Austrian contingent at the Siege of Toruń, whose Swedish garrison surrendered in December 1658. In 1659, he was given command of an army of 13,000 which invaded Swedish Pomerania and besieged Stettin; before the town fell, the Treaty of Oliva ended the war in May 1660, while de Souches quarrelled with his colleague Raimondo Montecuccoli and was ordered home to Moravia.

The 1663 to 1664 Austro-Turkish War began when Ottoman forces invaded Hungary and over-ran large parts of eastern and southern Moravia. Having successfully defended Brno and Olomouc, de Souches was promoted Field Marshal in May 1664 and given command of one of three separate forces operating in Hungary, with the other two led by Montecuccoli and Miklós Zrínyi. Although he won a minor victory at Levice in July 1664, while Montecuccoli stopped the main Ottoman advance at Saint Gotthard in August, Leopold was concerned by the expansionist policies of Louis XIV of France and agreed the Peace of Vasvár a few days later.

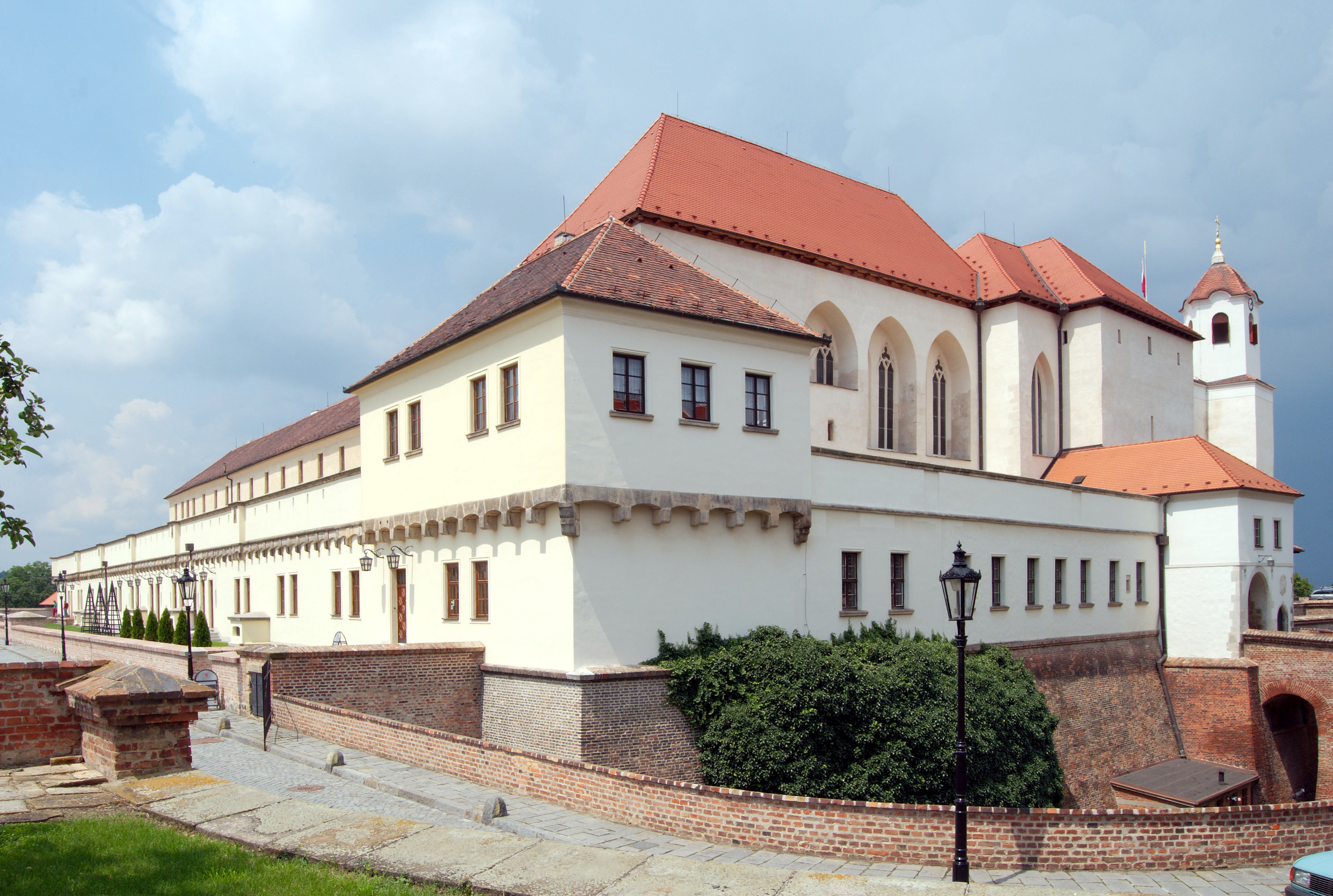
Špilberk Castle; rebuilt by de Souches as governor

In October 1664, de Souches was appointed Governor of Komárom, an important town on the modern Slovak/Hungarian border, and spent the next few years supervising the construction of new fortifications there, as well as other towns in the region. He also became a member of the Hofkriegsrat, or Imperial War Council, although his duties were largely nominal. When Austria entered the Franco-Dutch War in 1673 as an ally of the Dutch Republic and Spain, he was appointed commander of Imperial troops in the Low Countries and took part in the Battle of Seneffe in August 1674. The Imperial troops suffered minimal casualties in what was the bloodiest battle of the war and his Allies subsequently claimed de Souches had ignored requests for support. One suggestion is he did so under instructions from Emperor Leopold, who wanted to conserve resources for the Rhineland campaign, which he viewed as having far greater strategic significance.

Shortly thereafter, the Allies attacked the town of Oudenarde; siege operations commenced on 16 September, and the French began marching to its relief three days later. The Dutch and Spanish redoubled efforts to breach the walls before their arrival, but without advising his colleagues, de Souches withdrew the Imperial artillery to Ghent. Since his troops would not fight without their guns, and the Dutch and Spanish could not face the French on their own, the Allies were forced to abandon the siege. After strong protests from the Dutch States General, supported by some of his Austrian colleagues, de Souches was relieved of his command. In December 1674, Emperor Leopold set up an enquiry into his conduct, which resulted in de Souches being dismissed from his remaining military positions. He retired to his estates at Jevišovice in Moravia, where he died on 12 August 1682 and was buried in the Church of St. James (Brno).

== Sources ==
- Guthrie, William P (2003). The Later Thirty Years War: From the Battle of Wittstock to the Treaty of Westphalia. Greenwood Press. ISBN 0313052484.
- Klapka, Petr (2012). Jean-Louis Ratuit de Souches (1608-1682) de La Rochelle au service des Habsbourg (PHD) (in French). Sorbonne.
- Poten, Bernhard von (1892). "Souches, Ludwig Raduit de" . Allgemeine Deutsche Biographie (in German). Vol. 34. Leipzig: Duncker & Humblot. pp. 698–700.
- Šístek, František (2021). Imagining Bosnian Muslims in Central Europe: Representations, Transfers and Exchanges. Berghahn Books. ISBN 978-1789207743.
- Troost, Wouter (2004). William III the Stadholder-king; A Political Biography. Ashgate. ISBN 978-0754650713.
- Van Nimwegen, Olaf (2010). The Dutch Army and the Military Revolutions, 1588–1688. Boydell Press. ISBN 978-1843835752.
