= Kaspar Kornelius Mortaigne de Potelles =

17th century Flemmish General

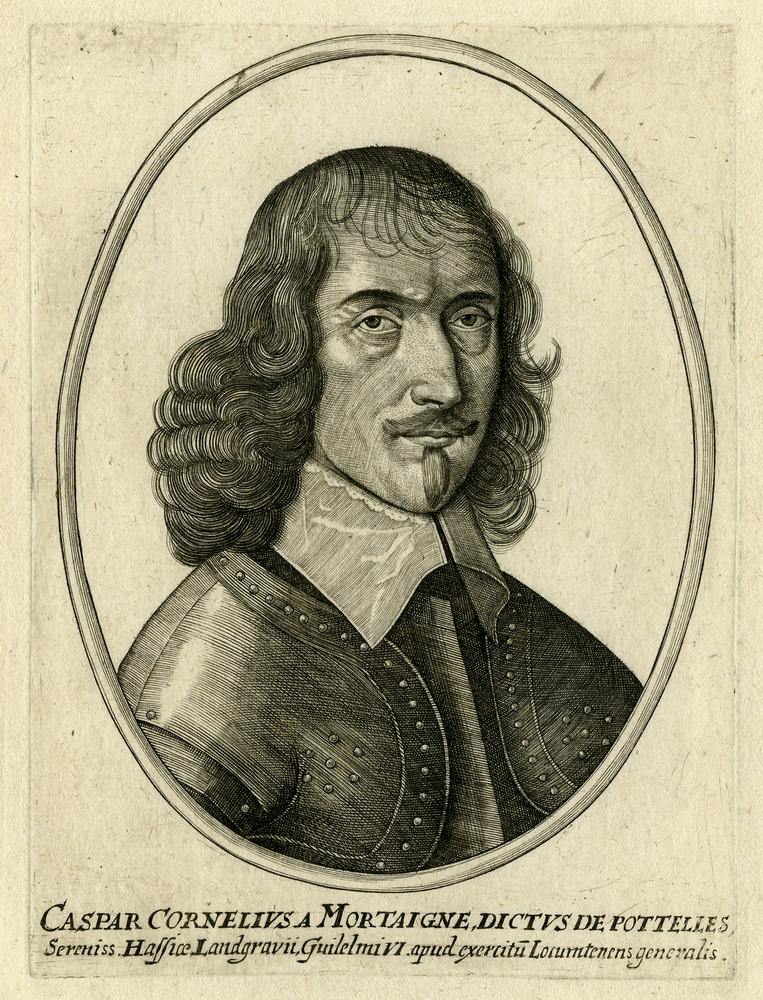
- Kaspar Kornelius Mortaigne de Potelles
- Born: 1609; Spanish Netherlands
- Died: 10 July 1647 (aged 37–38) Sankt Goar, Landgraviate of Hesse-Darmstadt
- Allegiance: Landgraviate of Hesse-Kassel (yes) Swedish Empire
- Service years: 1626–1647
- Rank: General-Lieutenant
- Conflicts: Thirty Years' War; Battle of Lutter; Battle of Breitenfeld (1642); Battle of Jankau; Torstenson War; Swedish invasion of Fehmarn; Hessian War

Kaspar Kornelius Mortaigne de Potelles (1609 – 10 July 1647 Sankt Goar) was a Flemish General-Lieutenant who fought during the course of the Thirty Years' and Hessian Wars.

== Biography ==
Mortaigne was born in 1609, to a Flemish Lutheran family. Mortaigne became a squire of Prince Philipp, son of Maurice, Landgrave of Hesse-Kassel, while he was pursuing a military education in the Netherlands. On 17 August 1626, Philipp was killed while fighting for the Protestant side at the Battle of Lutter. Following his master's death Mortaigne entered the service of Sweden, becoming colonel in 1637. The course of the Swedish intervention into the Thirty Years' War was abruptly interrupted in the aftermath of the 10 May 1641 death of Johan Banér, the commander of the Swedish expeditionary force.

Mortaigne became a leader of a large scale mutiny which paralyzed the Swedish army, demanding the immediate payment of their arrears. In July 1641, Mortaigne and Adam von Pfuhl were invited into Stockholm as representative of the mutineers. Mortaigne was promoted into brigadier general and received land in Pomerania, while the rest of the army was paid the sum of 486,200 thalers settling the crown's debts. During the course of 1642, Mortaigne was severely injured during an engagement in the vicinity of Brieg and took later part in the second Battle of Breitenfeld. In 1643, Mortaigne's forces ravaged through Moravia. On 30 June 1644, he led Swedish cavalry during the Swedish invasion of Fehmarn and occupied the island. On 12 February 1645, he was captured by an Imperial patrol outside Borna while carrying a portfolio of important documents. He was released on ransom, later commanding the Swedish center at the Battle of Jankau. In 1646, he returned to the Landgraviate of Hesse-Kassel with the approval of Christina, Queen of Sweden, receiving the rank of general-lieutenant. He led Hesse-Kassel's troops during the Hessian War. On 10 July 1647, a cannonball crushed his left leg, gravely wounding him while he was besieging the Rheinfels Castle.
