= Siege of Toruń (1658) =

1658 battle between the Swedish Empire and the Polish-Lithuanian Commonwealth

- Part of the Second Northern War / The Deluge
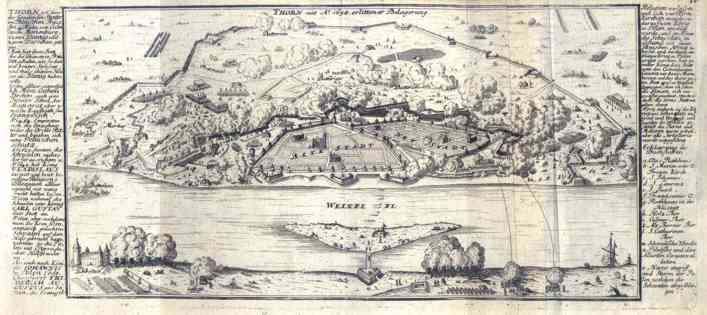
- Siege of Toruń 1658
Date	2 July – 30 December 1658
Location	Toruń (Poland) 53°00′40″N 18°36′25″E
Result	Polish-Austrian victory

Belligerents
Polish–Lithuanian Commonwealth; Holy Roman Empire; Brandenburg	Swedish Empire

Commanders and leaders
Jerzy Sebastian Lubomirski; Jan Fryderyk Sapieha; Krzysztof Grodzicki; Ludwig de Souches (Margraviate of Brandenburg) Bogusław Radziwiłł	(Swedish Empire) Barthold Hartwig von Bülow (Swedish Empire) Anders Sinclair (Swedish Empire) Bengt Oxenstierna

Strength
18,700 Polish soldiers (including about 500 Tatars); 4,600 Imperial soldiers 40 guns	2,420 Swedish soldiers and several hundred townspeople

Casualties and losses
1,800 killed	1,200 killed

The siege of Toruń was one of the battles during the Swedish invasion of Polish–Lithuanian Commonwealth (Second Northern War / Deluge). It started on 2 July 1658 and ended on 30 December 1658. Swedish garrison capitulated and Toruń returned to Polish hands.

== Siege and Activities in Prussia ==
In mid- September 1657, after the Siege of Kraków (1657), the Holy Roman Empire army of 15,000, allied to the Polish–Lithuanian Commonwealth, marched northwards. In late September, the Austrians concentrated near Płock. Polish King Jan Kazimierz wanted to use them to capture the fortified city of Toruń, but Austrian preparations for the siege were very slow and not completed before winter. Due to weather conditions, all military activities were postponed until spring 1658, and the Austrians spent the winter in Greater Poland.

Polish plans for 1658 were concentrated on gradual recapture of the province of Royal Prussia. First objective was Toruń, a strategically located Vistula river port, with modern fortifications. Due to Dano-Swedish War, most Austrians, under Field Marshal Raimondo Montecuccoli, left Poland and marched to Jutland.

On 2 July 1658, Austrian division of 4,000, under General Jean-Louis Raduit de Souches began the siege of Toruń. The Austrians were reinforced by Polish infantry, while the city was defended by a Swedish garrison of 2,400, commanded by General Barthold Hartwig von Bulow. Swedes were supported by German-speaking, Protestant residents of Toruń.

In the first weeks, Austrian and Polish commandants limited their activities to blocking the city. On 26 July, artillery barrage initiated an assault, which resulted in capture of several Swedish strongpoints. On 1 August, Krzysztof Grodzicki arrived with 3,000 infantry. Soon afterwards, Jan Fryderyk Sapieha brought 1,000 soldiers, also the division of Stefan Czarniecki (4,000 cavalry) joined the Polish - Austrian forces. Furthermore, Brandenburg-Prussia division under Boguslaw Radziwill, which had switched alliances, cooperated with Poles. The division of Czarniecki remained near Toruń until early September, when it left Poland, marching towards Denmark. On 12 October, Czarniecki and his soldiers reached Hamburg.

In September 1658, Polish-Austrian forces were reinforced with a division of Jerzy Lubomirski, and on 23 September, Queen Marie Louise Gonzaga arrived to Toruń, together with her court. By that time, the Polish army stationed near the city had almost 19,000 soldiers, while Austrian forces numbered 4,600, with 40 cannons. Main assault took place in the night of 16/17 November, when Polish-Austrian soldiers captured three bastions, losing 1,000 men. The Swedish garrison finally capitulated on 30 December. During the siege, the Swedes lost 1,200 men, while Poles and Austrians lost 1,800 soldiers, including 1,500 Poles.
