= Jan Fryderyk Sapieha (1618–1664) =

Jan Fryderyk Sapiecha
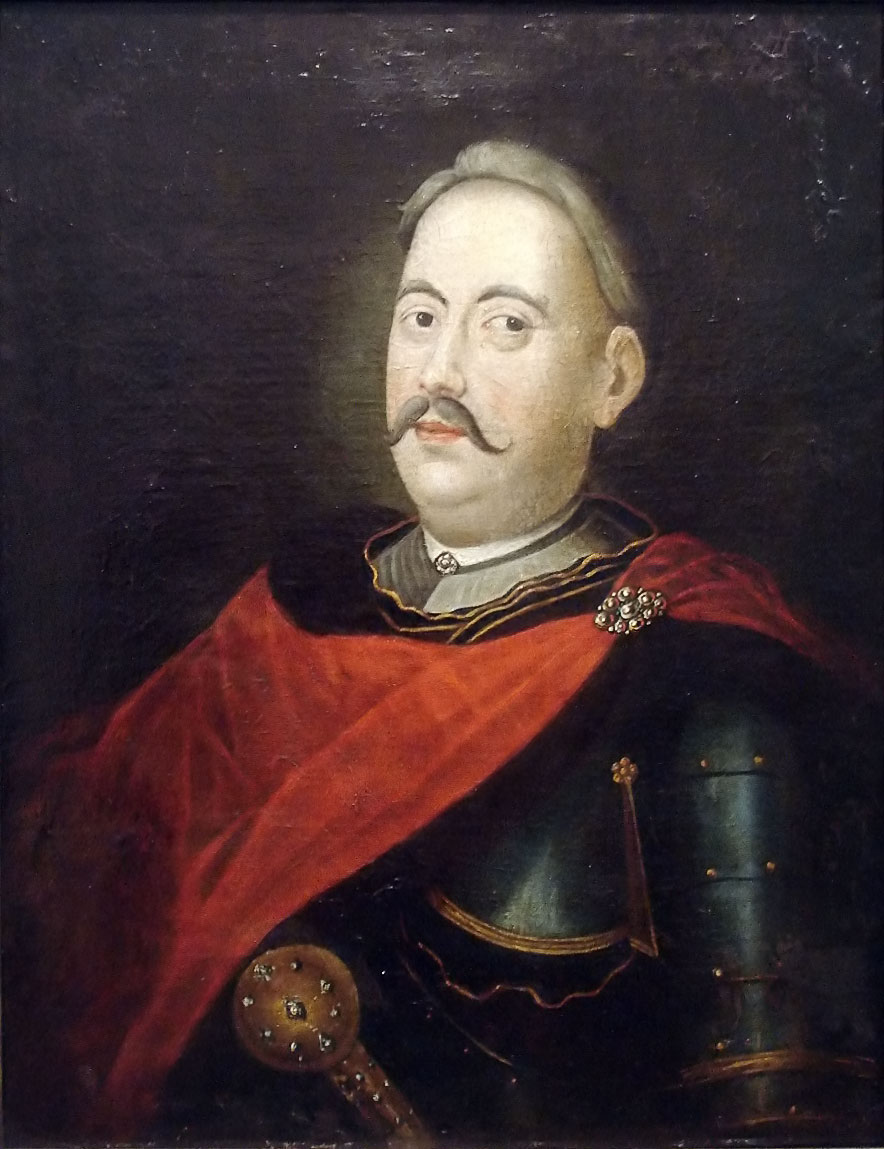
- Born: 1618
- Died: 1664
- Partner: Constance Herburt
- Children: Mikołaj Leon Sapieha; Kazimierz Władysław Sapieha; Paweł Franciszek Sapieha

Lis coat of arms

Jan Fryderyk Sapieha (born 1618, died 1664) was a Polish nobleman, politician and military officer, Field Writer of the Crown, and member of the Sapieha family.

== Biography ==
Jan Fryderyk Sapieha was born in 1618 as the son of Grand Hetman of Lithuania Jan Piotr Sapieha and Zofia née Poradowska. His family played an important role in the political and military life of the Polish—Lithuanian Commonwealth. Sapieha received a thorough education, studying in Poland and abroad.

In 1644, Sapieha was appointed Crown Field Scribe, which began his active military career. He took part in a number of key battles, including the Battle of Berestechko in 1651, where he commanded troops with great success. His role in the fight against the Swedes during the Swedish Deluge (1655–1660) was significant; despite initially joining the Tyszowce Confederation, he quickly switched to the side of John Casimir, gaining recognition for his loyalty and command skills. In addition to his military career, Sapieha was politically active. He participated in sejms, held various public functions and engaged in diplomatic missions. His activities were aimed not only at defending the Commonwealth, but also at strengthening the position of the Sapieha family. He was a well-known advocate of his family's interests, which greatly influenced his political decisions. Sapieha died in 1664.

He left a significant impact on Polish history through his involvement in military and political activities. His life and activities contributed to strengthening the position of the Sapieha family, as well as to defending the interests of the Commonwealth during the difficult times of the 17th century. The memory of his merits has survived through numerous historical records that document his contribution to the development and defence of the state. His wife was a Constance Herburt, daughter of the castellan of Kamieniec (Mikolaj Herburt.
