= Siege of Brno =

1645 siege of the Thirty Years' War

- Part of the Thirty Years' War
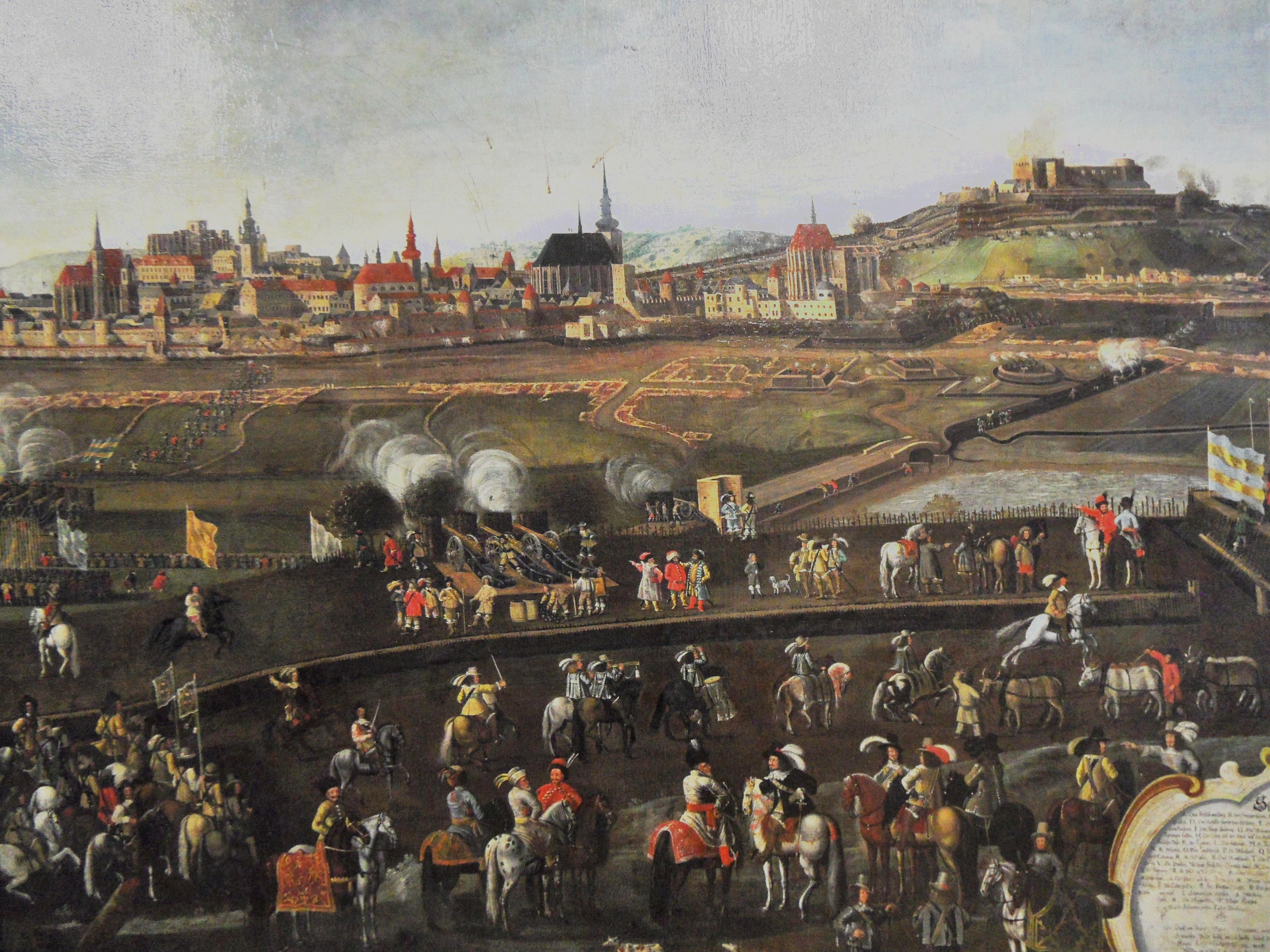
- The siege of Brno by Swedish and Transylvanian troops
| Date | 3 May – 23 August 1645 |
| Location | Brno, Margraviate of Moravia, Habsburg monarchy (now the Czech Republic) 49°11′33″N 16°36′30″E |
| Result | Imperial victory |

Belligerents
| (yes) Swedish Empire; Transylvania | Holy Roman Empire |

Commanders and leaders
| (yes) Lennart Torstensson (yes) Arvid Wittenberg; Sigismund II Rákóczi | Jean-Louis Raduit de Souches; Martin Středa |

Strength
| c. 28,000 soldiers | c. 426 soldiers, plus c. 1,000 armed men from local militia |

Casualties and losses
| c. 8,000 killed, wounded, deserted, died of disease | c. 250 dead |

The siege of Brno, which occurred from 3 May to 23 August 1645, was the second Swedish siege of the city of Brno in the last years of the Thirty Years' War. The Brno garrison, consisting of 500 soldiers and about 1,000 Brno residents, successfully defended the city against about 28,000 soldiers of General Lennart Torstensson. The success of the defenders was the starting point of a brilliant career for their commander, Jean-Louis Raduit de Souches, in the service of the Habsburgs; the siege kept the Swedish army occupied for several months. This Austrian victory ultimately contributed to Brno becoming the metropolis of Moravia, at the expense of the conquered Olomouc.

== Background ==
In 1636, Emperor Ferdinand II of Habsburg made Brno the metropolis of Moravia, as he had established his governorship here, the so-called "Royal Tribunal". In 1642, Brno became the seat of all royal and state offices, as the politically more important Olomouc had been occupied by invading Swedes since 1642. When the danger of an expected Swedish attack became clear, some state dignitaries fled to Vienna. Brno was then unsuccessfully sieged by the Swedish army in 1643.

On 31 January 1645, the Swedes invaded the lands of the Bohemian Crown via the Ore Mountains and on March 6, in the Battle of Jankau, they defeated the imperial army of Ferdinand III. For Swedish general Torstensson, who just finished the campaign called Torstenson War, and his army this victory opened the way for the march on Vienna. The situation forced him to stop in front of the Austrian metropolis, however, as his army was now clearly exhausted and lacked the supplies that were essential for besieging a large city. The Danube river also represented a difficult hurdle to overcome. Therefore, Torstensson moved to Moravia, Olomouc Fort specifically, which had been conquered in 1642 and gave the Swedes access to the delivery routes into Moravia, and established there the operational base of his forces. Only one important fortress now stood in the way of the planned advance to Vienna: the city of Brno.

=== Preparations ===
On 14 March 1645, the emperor appointed the 37-year-old colonel of French descent, Jean-Louis Raduit de Souches, as the commander of the city. The Frenchman initially enjoyed little trust among the citizens of Brno, not just because he was a Protestant Huguenot. He immediately began to prepare the city and its modest forces for a long siege.

He and the then city captain decided that the city's defensive structures should be renovated and fortified or rebuilt. All buildings that were 600 paces or closer to the city walls were demolished, old ditches were deepened, and new ones dug in their places. To ensure that the city's population could be fed, a mill driven by a group of oxen was built, and all the city's wells were cleaned. A hidden road (strada coperta) then connected the city with the Špilberk fortress. Commander de Souches soon gained respect through his determination and attitude to securing the city's defenses. He countered a severe shortage of weapons with intensive production, in which the city's population participated. The number of defenders was small, 1,475 men were armed, of whom only 426 were soldiers, and the moderate force was supplemented by practically all of the city's able-bodied men, since Brno itself had perhaps 5,000 inhabitants, including women and children. Nevertheless, everyone was determined to withstand the besieging Swedes' 18-fold superiority. At the beginning of May 1645, everything necessary was brought in just in time. Equipment consisted of muskets, fortress cannons, but also makeshift scythes and other improvised peasant weapons.

== Siege ==
The siege of Brno started 3 May 1645 when Torstensson and his army reached the city. After failed negotiations, the Swedes started the attack with an artillery bombardment of the city and the Špilberk fortress. However the initial assault concluded without any decisive successes. The defenders of the city were able to repel the Swedish attacks and also made several counter sallies outside the city walls against the Swedish forces. The morale of the defenders was also boosted thanks to the exhortations of a Jesuit priest Martin Středa, who rallied the citizens in arms. Although, in July, the Swedish forces managed to dig tunnels under the fortifications and detonate gunpowder mines, the damage was not significant and no breaches were created. On 26 July the Swedes received reinforcements led by Sigismund II Rákóczi who arrived with about 10 000 men. However the bulk of the force were light cavalry men who weren't able to contribute to the siege. The primary addition of Rákóczi's troops was two heavy cannons that were added to the available Swedish fire power.

In the beginning of August, General Torstensson realized that the Rákóczi family was involved in negotiations with the emperor for a peace deal. Torstensson gave the order to prepare a final attempt to conquer the city. The assault against the city defenses occurred on 15 August 1645. However, it failed, with the Swedish forces unable to break the cities defences. Eight days later, on August 23, Torstensson ordered his exhausted forces to withdraw. The Swedish forces lost about 8,000 men when counting both the dead and wounded.

== Aftermath ==
The exhausting and failed siege of Brno forced the Swedes to abandon the military operations in the area around Vienna. The successful operations of the imperial forces in Bohemia and Silesia prevented Torstensson's successor, Lieutenant General Arvid Wittenberg, from making further advances into what is now the Austrian state of Lower Austria in the following year. The Swedish garrisons on the Danube and in the other parts of the country were therefore left to their own devices, which pretty much contributed to their recapturing, especially of the two important Swedish fortresses of Krems and Korneuburg.

== Works cited ==
- Guthrie, William P (2003). The Later Thirty Years War: From the Battle of Wittstock to the Treaty of Westphalia. Greenwood Press. ISBN 0313052484.
- František Matějek: Švédové na Moravě za třicetileté války. In: Acta Musei Moraviae, Scientiae sociales, Part 1: Jg. 73 (1988), pp. 127–161 and, Part 3: Jg. 75 (1990), p. 141–172. (Czech)
- SAMEK, Bohumil a Jiří KREJČÍ. The Monastery of Augustinians in Brno. Brno: Augustiniánský klášter, 1993, p. 23. ISBN 80-85032-21-X. Online
- Sborník Forum Brunense. Brno: Muzeum města Brna, 2022, 2022(1), p. 110. ISSN 0862-3538. Online
- SEMOTANOVÁ, Eva. Czech lands on early maps. Prague: Ministry of Defense of the Czech Republic, 2008, p. 64. ISBN 978-80-7278-466-0.
