= Staré Sedlo (Tachov District) =

- Municipality
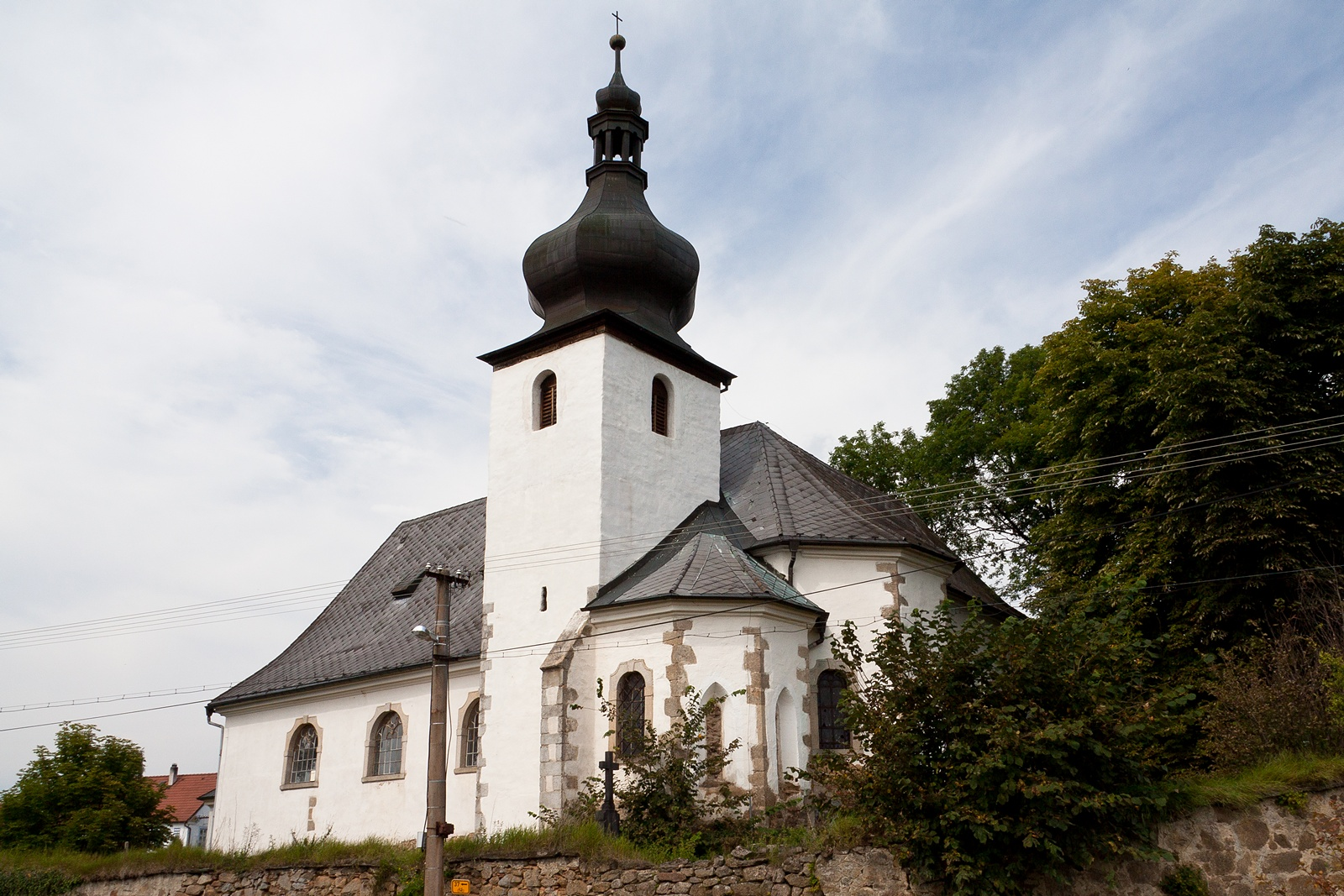
- Church of the Assumption of the Virgin Mary

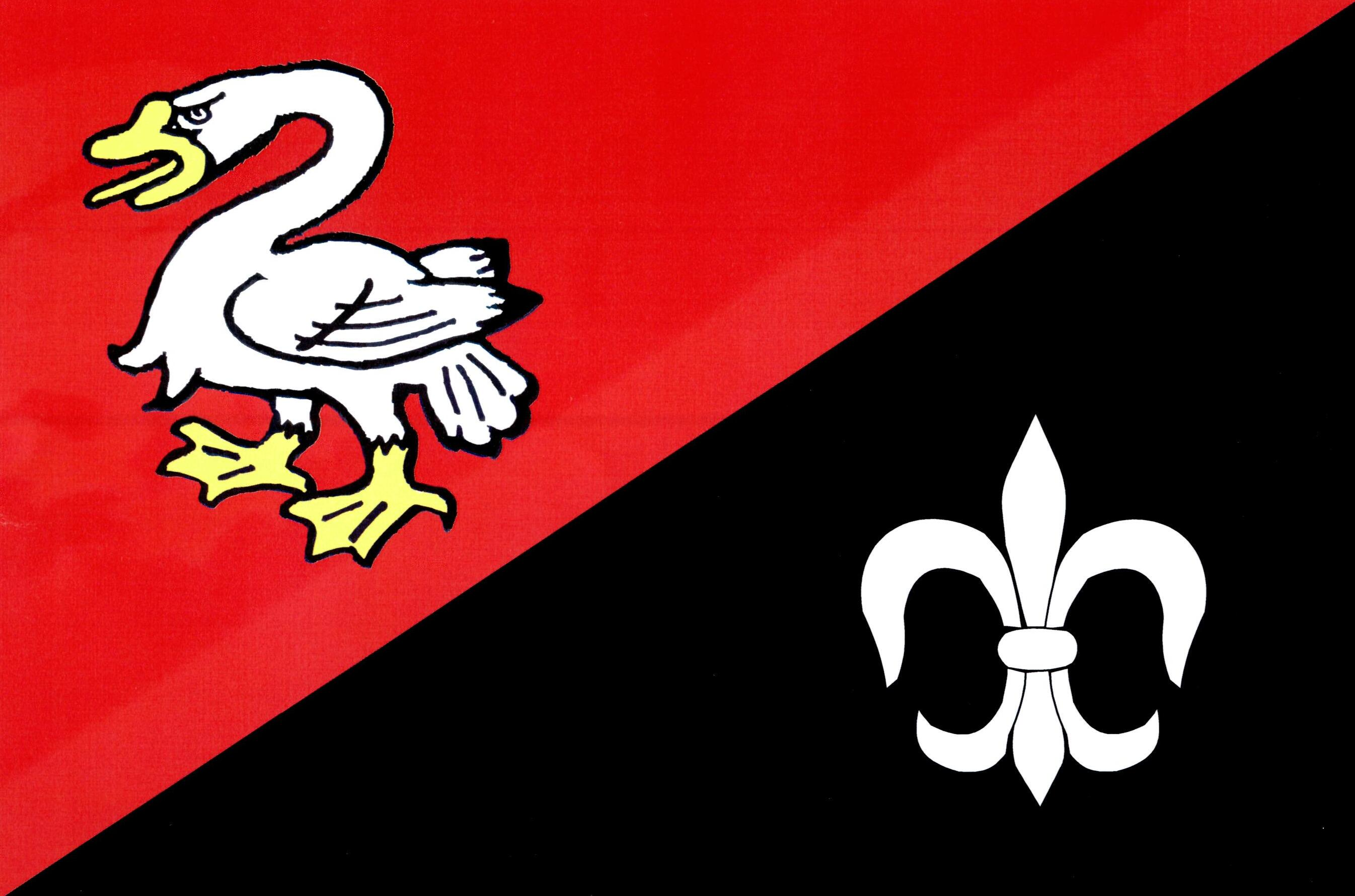
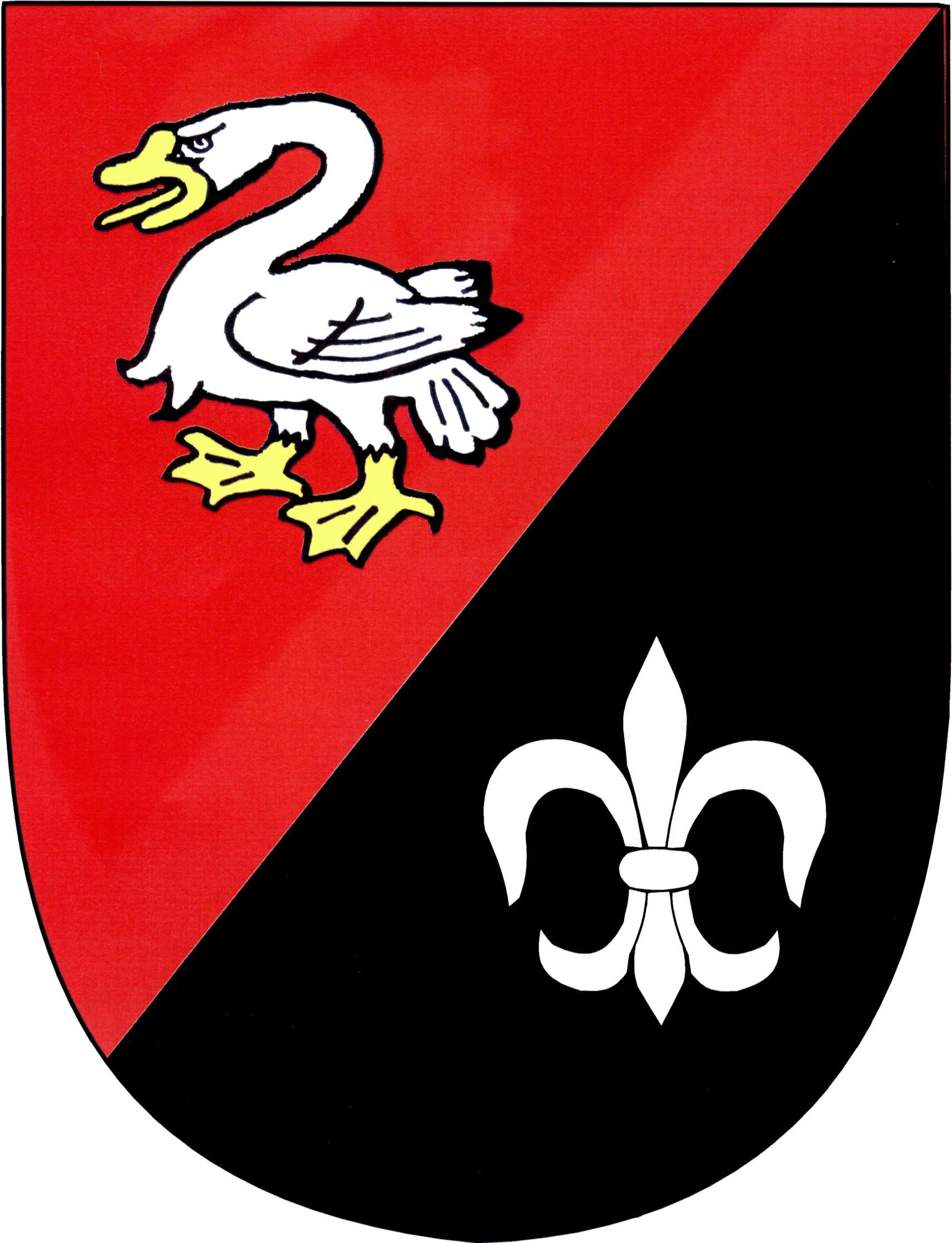
- Flag Coat of arms

- Location in the Czech Republic
- Coordinates: 49°39′58″N 12°51′49″E
- Country: Czech Republic
- Region: Plzeň
- District: Tachov
- First mentioned: 1115

Area
  - Total: 23.60 km^{2} (9.11 sq mi)
- Elevation: 429 m (1,407 ft)

Population (2026-01-01)
  - Total: 287
  - Density: 12.2/km^{2} (31.5/sq mi)
- Time zone: UTC+1 (CET)
  - Summer (DST): UTC+2 (CEST)
- Postal code: 348 02
- Website: www.obecstaresedlo.cz

Staré Sedlo (German: Altsattel) is a municipality and village in Tachov District in the Plzeň Region of the Czech Republic. It has about 300 inhabitants.

Staré Sedlo lies approximately 24 kilometres (15 mi) south-east of Tachov, 38 km (24 mi) west of Plzeň, and 121 km (75 mi) south-west of Prague.

== Administrative division ==
Staré Sedlo consists of three municipal parts (in brackets population according to the 2021 census):

- Staré Sedlo (126)
- Darmyšl (62)
- Racov (62)

== Demographics ==
Historical population
Year	Pop.	±%
1869	948	—
1880	876	−7.6%
1890	891	+1.7%
1900	923	+3.6%
1910	933	+1.1%
1921	907	−2.8%
1930	888	−2.1%
1950	438	−50.7%
1961	433	−1.1%
1970	338	−21.9%
1980	315	−6.8%
1991	297	−5.7%
2001	263	−11.4%
2011	233	−11.4%
2021	250	+7.3%
Source: Censuses
