= Lennart Torstensson =

Swedish Field Marshal, Privy Councillor and Governor-General (1603–1651)

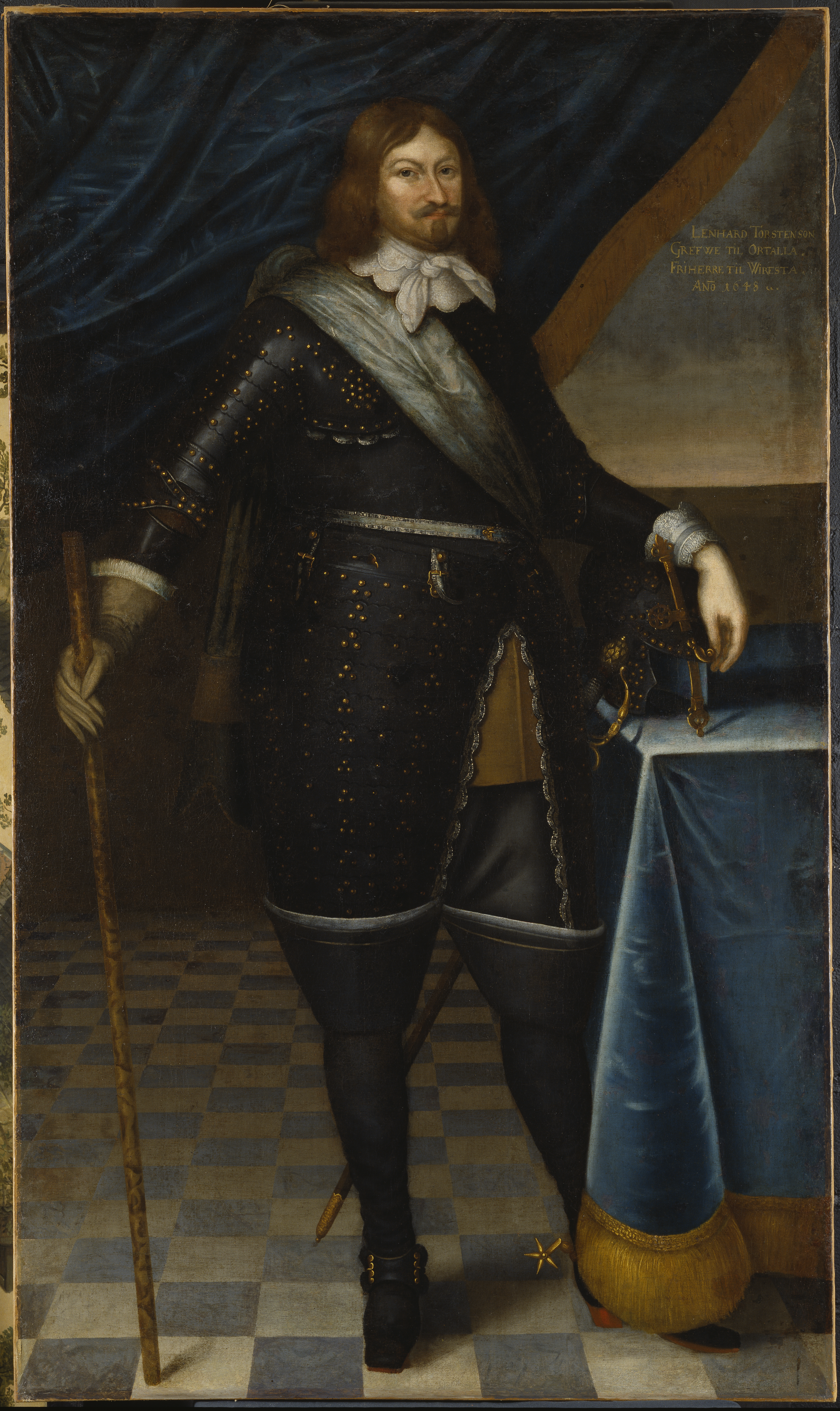
- Lennart Torstensson painted 1648 by unknown artist.
- Born: 17 August 1603; Forstena, Västergötland, Sweden
- Died: 7 April 1651 (aged 47); Stockholm, Sweden
- Military career
- Allegiance: Sweden
- Branch: Swedish Army
- Service years: 1624–1645
- Rank: Fältmarskalk
- Nickname: Blixten (Lightning)
- Conflicts: Polish–Swedish War (1626–1629); Thirty Years' War; Assault on Greifenhagen; Battle of Breitenfeld (1631); Battle of Rain; Battle of Alte Veste (POW); Battle of Wittstock; Battle of Chemnitz; Battle of Breitenfeld (1642); Battle of Jüterbog; Battle of Jankau; Siege of Brno; Torstenson War; Torstensson's Jutland campaign; Assault on Christianspris; Siege of Snoghøj; Swedish invasion of Fehmarn
- Other work: Privy Councillor, Governor-General

Signature
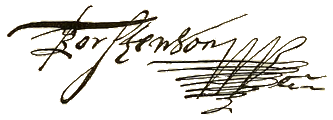

Lennart Torstensson (17 August 1603 – 7 April 1651) was a Swedish field marshal and statesman who later served as Governor-General of Pomerania, Västergötland, Dalsland, Värmland and Halland. A prominent commander during the Thirty Years' War, he helped develop the use of more mobile artillery on the battlefield and won a series of major victories against Imperial forces. He also led the Swedish invasion of Denmark during the Torstenson War (1643–1645), which was named after him. The period of his supreme command marks one of the most successful chapters in the military history of the Swedish army.

== Early career ==
He was born at Forstena manor in Västergötland. His parents were Märta Nilsdotter Posse and Torsten Lennartsson, of the noble house Forstena, who was supporter of King Sigismund and, for a while, the commandant of Älvsborg fortress. Young Lennart's parents fled to exile in the year of his birth because his father had confessed to being loyal to the deposed Sigismund. Lennart was taken care of by relatives - his father returned to Sweden only when Lennart was around twenty. His paternal uncle Anders Lennartsson was Lord High Constable of Sweden and trusted by Duke Charles, but he fell at the Battle of Kircholm in 1605.

== Military career ==
At the age of fifteen he became one of the pages of the young King Gustavus Adolphus and was allowed to observe the military campaign in Livonia. He also served during the Prussian campaigns of 1628 and 1629.

It is told that at one battle Gustavus Adolphus sent Torstensson with an order to one of the officers. On his way Torstensson noticed that the enemy had changed position, and he altered the King's orders correspondingly. Gustavus noticed the new development. When Torstensson returned he told Gustavus what he had done.

Shortly thereafter, in 1629 Torstensson was put in charge of the Swedish artillery, which under his guidance contributed greatly to the victories of Breitenfeld and Lech. On 25 December 1630, he also commanded the artillery during an assault on Greifenhagen, which was captured. The same year he was taken prisoner at Alte Veste and imprisoned for nearly a year at Ingolstadt. Under Johan Banér he served at the Battle of Wittstock on the left wing of the combined army of Banér and Field Marshal Alexander Leslie. He also served with distinction during the defence of Pomerania in 1637 and 1638, as well as at the Battle of Chemnitz and the raid into Bohemia in 1639. Illness, contracted during his imprisonment, compelled him to return to Sweden in 1641.

=== Field Marshal ===
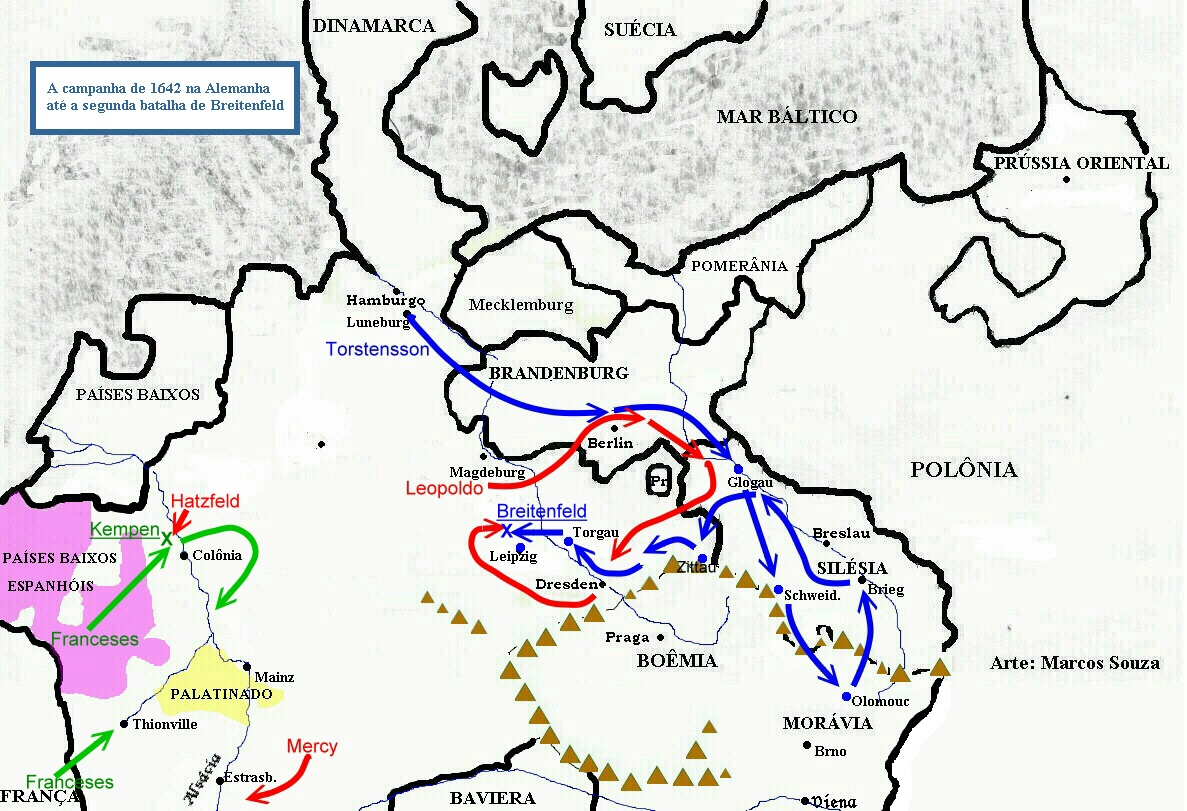
Torstenson's campaigns in Eastern Germany in 1642.

The sudden death of Banér in May 1641 recalled Torstensson to Germany as generalissimo of the Swedish forces and Governor General of Pomerania. He was at the same time promoted to the rank of Field Marshal. In 1642 he marched through Brandenburg and Silesia into Moravia, taking the principal fortresses of Głogów and Olomouc on his way. On returning through Saxony he crushed the imperial army at the second Battle of Breitenfeld on 23 October 1642.

In 1643 Torstensson invaded Moravia for the second time, but was suddenly recalled to invade Denmark, when his rapid and unexpected intervention paralysed the Danish defence on the land side, though Torstenson's own position in Jutland was for a time precarious owing to the skilful handling of the Danish fleet by Christian IV of Denmark. In December 1643, he successfully stormed Christianspris. In 1644, he successfully besieged Snoghøj. Later, in June, he participated in the Swedish invasion of Fehmarn. In 1644, he also he led his army for the third time into the heart of Germany and routed the imperials at the battle of Jüterbog on 3 December. In January 1645 he broke into Bohemia, and the destruction of the Imperial army at the Battle of Jankau on 6 March 1645 laid open before him the road to Vienna. He reached Korneuburg near the Habsburg capital in April but his exhausted army was unable to penetrate any further and lost 8,000 men in a failed siege of Brünn in Moravia from 3 May to 23 August. Afterwards, the Swedish commander marched once more against Vienna but on 25 September turned to retreat back to northwestern Bohemia. On 23 December 1645, Torstensson, crippled by gout, was forced to resign his command to Carl Gustaf Wrangel and returned to Sweden in the early summer of 1646.

In 1647 he was created a count. From 1648 to 1651 he ruled all the western provinces of Sweden, as Governor-General. After his death in Stockholm on 7 April 1651 he was buried in the Riddarholm Church, the Pantheon of Sweden.

=== Assessment ===
Monument to Torstensson at Forstena in Västergötland.

Torstensson was remarkable for the extraordinary and incalculable rapidity of his movements, though very frequently he had to lead the army in a litter, as his bodily infirmities would not permit him to mount his horse. He was often considered the most scientific artillery officer and most successful engineer in the Swedish army.

== Family ==
Torstensson was married in 1633 to Baroness Beata De la Gardie (1612–1680), daughter of the Privy Councillor Johan De la Gardie (1582–1640) and Katarina Kristersdotter Oxenstierna (–1625). They had a son, Anders Torstenson, who also served as a Privy Councillor and Governor-General of Estonia.

== Notes ==
Military offices
| Preceded by Johan Banér | Commander-in-chief of the Swedish Armed Forces in Germany; 1641–1645 | Succeeded by Carl Gustaf Wrangel |
Political offices
| Preceded by Sten Svantesson Bielke | Governor-General of Pomerania; 1641–1648 | Succeeded by Carl Gustaf Wrangel |
| Preceded by None | Governor-General of Västergötland, Dal, Värmland and Halland; 1648–1651 | Succeeded by Adolf John of Palatinate-Zweibrücken |
