= Eldgarnsö Nature Reserve =

Nature reserve in Stockholm, Sweden

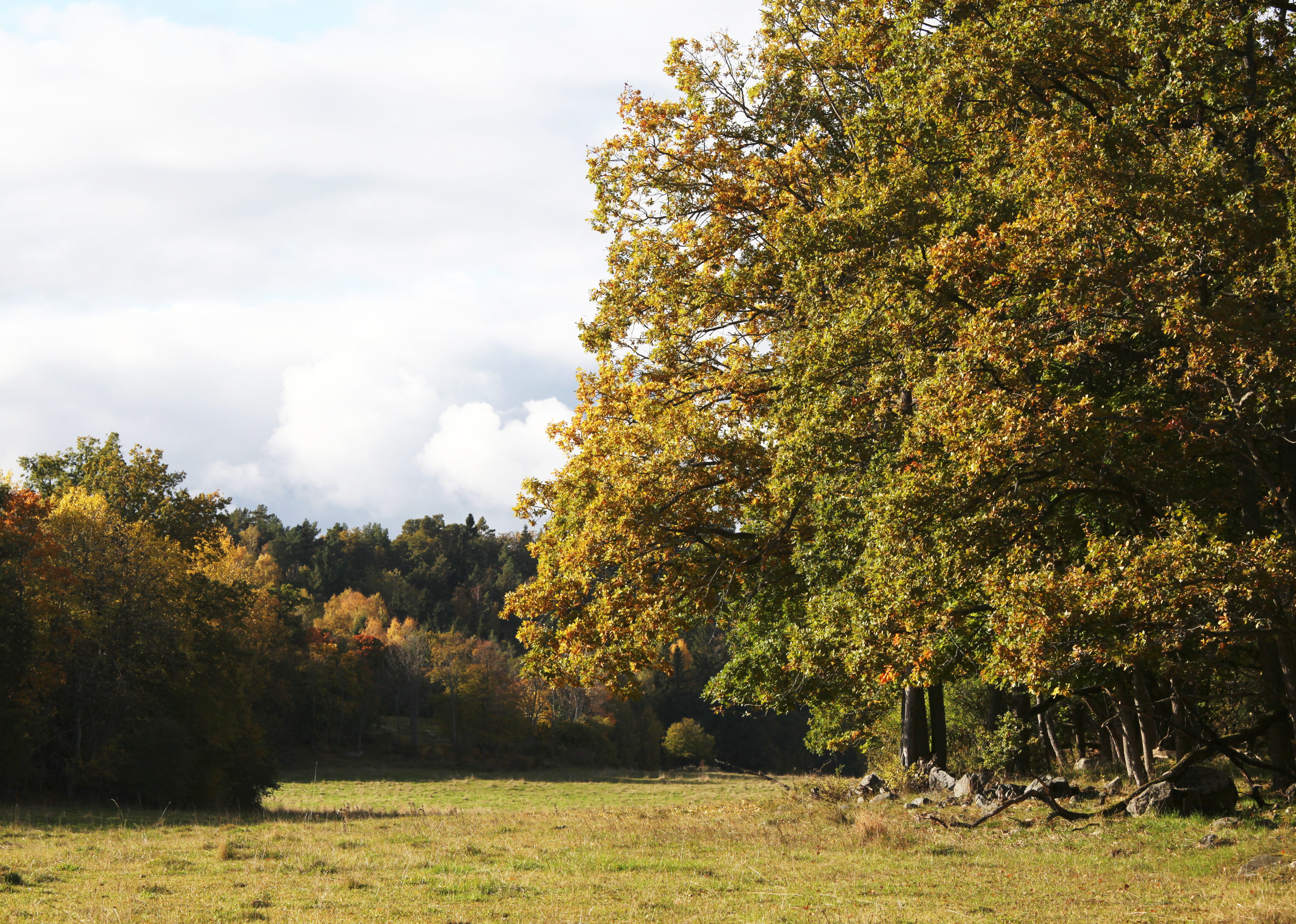

- Location within Stockholm
- Location: Sweden
- Nearest city: Ekerö
- Coordinates: 59°26′13″N 17°39′07″E
- Area: 490 ha (1,200 acres)
- Established: 1979

Eldgarnsö Nature Reserve (Swedish: Eldgarnsö naturreservat) is a nature reserve in Stockholm County in Sweden.

Eldgarnsö Nature Reserve consists of Eldgarnsö island in Lake Mälaren. A 6-kilometre-long (3.7 mi) trail runs around the island. The nature reserve consists of on the one hand an area of broad-leaf forest, and on the other of an area which is more mixed, containing arable land, coniferous forest and beach meadows with shallow water overgrown with reeds.

== Flora ==
The broad-leaf forest is dominated by oak, European ash and wych elm. Mistletoe grows among the trees; this parasite is uncommon in Sweden (and hence a protected species) due to the cool climate, but survives in local areas of warmer micro-climate such as Eldgarnsö island. In the open meadows, solitary oak trees rise above stands of unspotted lungwort, Cardamine bulbifera, spring vetchling and black pea.

== Fauna ==
The island has a rich bird-life. Species include the European honey buzzard, Eurasian wryneck and ortolan bunting. The nature reserve also supports a rich variety of insects.
