= Häringe-Hammersta Nature Reserve =

Nature reserve in Stockholm County, Sweden

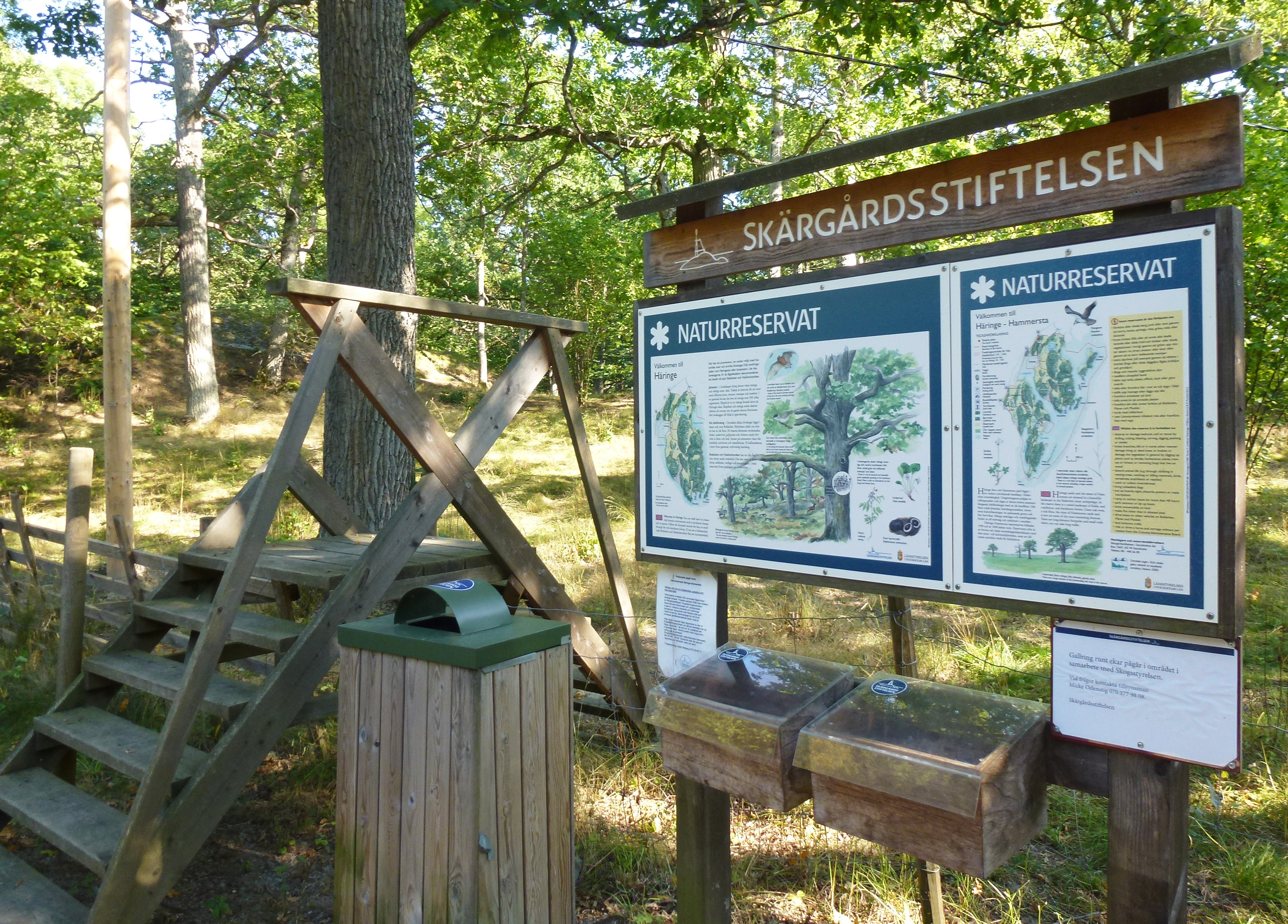

- Location within Stockholm
- Location: Sweden
- Nearest city: Nynäshamn
- Coordinates: 59°02′00″N 18°01′00″E
- Area: 1,887 ha (4,660 acres)
- Established: 1990

Häringe-Hammersta Nature Reserve (Swedish: Häringe-Hammersta naturreservat) is a nature reserve in Stockholm County in Sweden.

The nature reserve consists of two peninsulas and several different kinds of landscape types. Häringe Castle is located within the nature reserve, as is Hammersta Manor and castle ruins. South of Häringe Castle, the landscape consists of open, arable land with interspersed groves dominated by maple, linden and sloan. Beneath the trees, flowers such as sweetscented bedstraw, spring vetchling, common toothwort and Viola mirabilis are known to grow. Further south the landscape changes into contiguous old coniferous forest. A small lake (Lake Bobäcken) as well as the inlets of the sea provide important habitats for birds, who come here to rest during their annual spring migration. Birds such as swans and ducks also attract white-tailed eagles. The area is rich in game such as fox, hare, roe deer and badger.

The other part of the nature reserve, the Hammersta peninsula, contains some of the richest broad-leaf forest in Stockholm County. The landscape here is characterised especially by several very old oak trees. Several unusual species of grass also grow in the area, including Bromus benekenii, wood melick, Poa remota and Hordelymus europaeus.
