= Fabian Wrede, Count of Östanå =

17th-century Swedish politician and nobleman

Fabian Wrede
- Count of Östanå
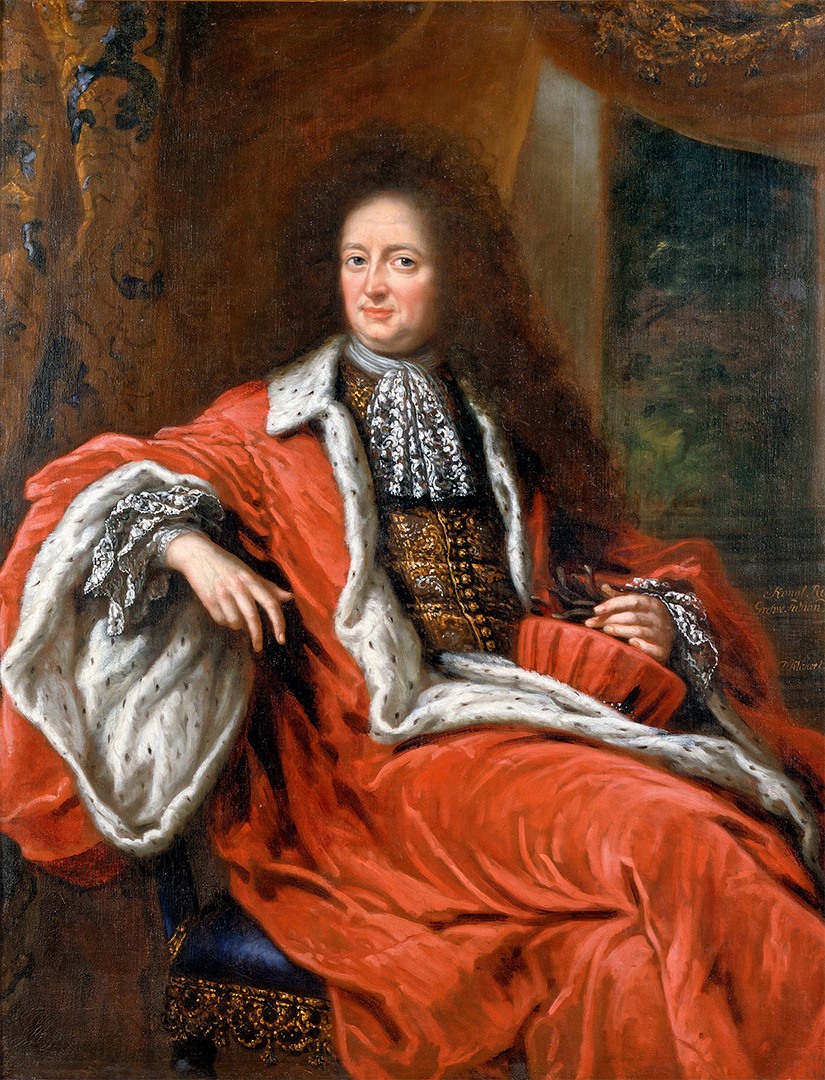
- Count Fabian Wrede in the robes of the Privy Council of Sweden

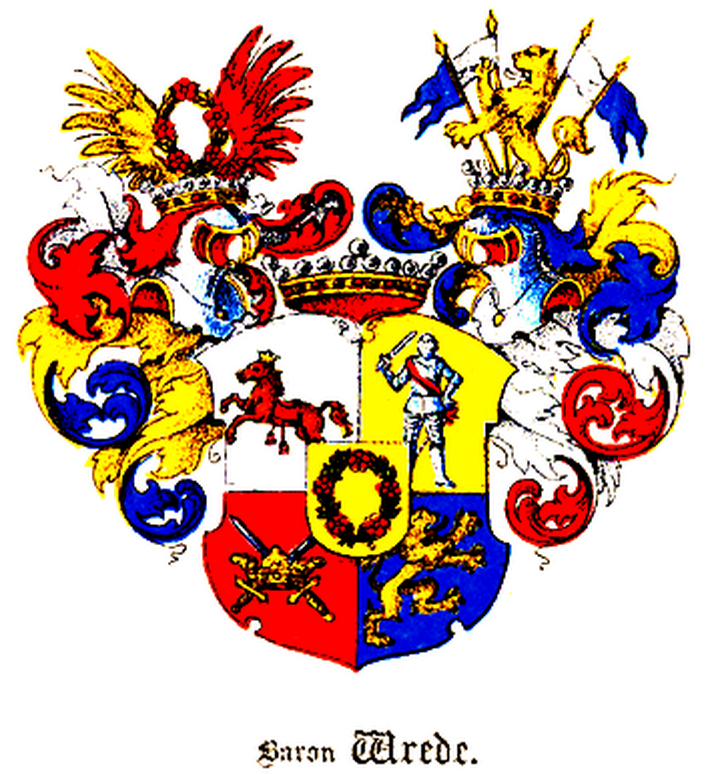
- Coat of arms
- Full name: Fabian Wrede af Elimä
- Other titles: Baron of Tjolöholm, Lord of Fånö, Häringe, Harviala, Elimä, Harbonäs, Ålhult, and Eksjö-Hofgård
- Born: 20 March 1641; Peipola, Finland
- Died: December 6, 1712 (aged 71); Stockholm, Sweden
- Buried: Björklinge Church
- Noble family: Wrede
- Spouse: Brita Cruus af Gudhem (m. 1672)
- Issue: Carl Casper Wrede; Agneta Wrede; Sofia Wrede; Lars Wrede
- Father: Casper Henriksson Wrede
- Mother: Sophia Taube
- Occupation: Civil servant, landowner

Count Fabian Wrede af Elimä (Peipola, Finland, 20 March 1641 – 6 December 1712) was a Swedish statesman, count, and landowner who served as a central figure in the administration of the Swedish Empire under Kings Charles XI and Charles XII. He is best known for his work on the Great Reduction, a reclamation of noble lands for the Crown's treasury.

Throughout his career, Wrede held numerous high-ranking positions in the Swedish government. He was created Count of Östanå in 1687.

== Early life ==
Fabian Wrede was born on March 20, 1641 in Peippola, Finland to Baron Casper Henriksson Wrede and Sophia Taube of the noble Taube family. He was born to the Finnish-Swede Wrede noble family. He held the title of Baron by birthright, a title granted to his father by Queen Christina in 1654, as a posthumous reward for the actions of his grandfather, Henrik Wrede. During the Battle of Kircholm in 1605, Henrik Wrede saved the life of King Charles IX of Sweden by giving the King his own horse after the King's horse had been killed, allowing the king to flee the battlefield. Henrik Wrede was subsequently encircled and killed.

In 1661, Wrede began a six-year tour of Europe, visiting Holland, France, Italy, and Hungary. While returning through Hamburg, he met the abdicated Christina, Queen of Sweden, who appointed him as her chamberlain, a position he would exchange for a similar one with the king.

== Political career ==
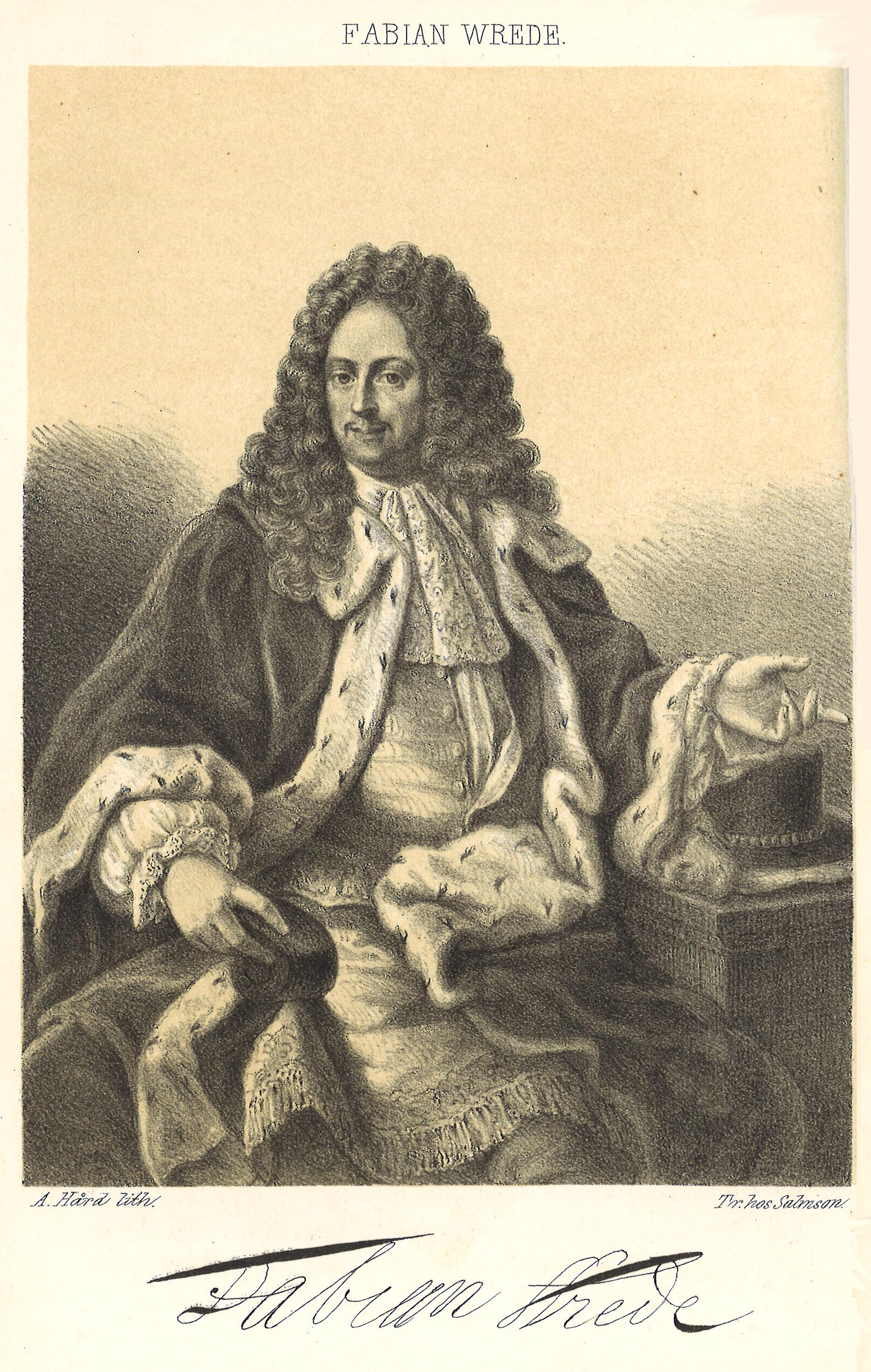
Lithograph of Fabian Wrede by Adolf Hårdh.

Wrede began his administrative career as a governor, first in Vyborg County in 1675 and later in Uppsala County in 1681. At the 1682 Riksdag of the Estates, Wrede was appointed Lord Marshal, the presiding officer of the Estate of the Nobility. In 1685, he became a member of the Privy Council of Sweden and was appointed president of the Board of Mines and the state treasury. After the death of Claes Fleming in the same year, Wrede became the central figure in the Great Reduction serving as the head of the Reduction Commission and the Reduction Board, a political project that confiscated lands from the nobility to stabilize the crown's finances. Although he was a member of the nobility, Wrede's work on the policy established him as a key advisor to King Charles XI. In 1687, he was elevated to president of both the Chamber College and the Board of Commerce. For his service, he was created Count of Östanå on 10 December 1687.

Following the accession of Charles XII, Wrede was appointed to the regency government of 1697. With the outbreak of the Great Northern War, he became responsible for the procurement of war funds and the Navy. In 1711, Wrede was dismissed from all his offices except for the council office and the presidency of the Board of Commerce.

== Personal life and properties ==
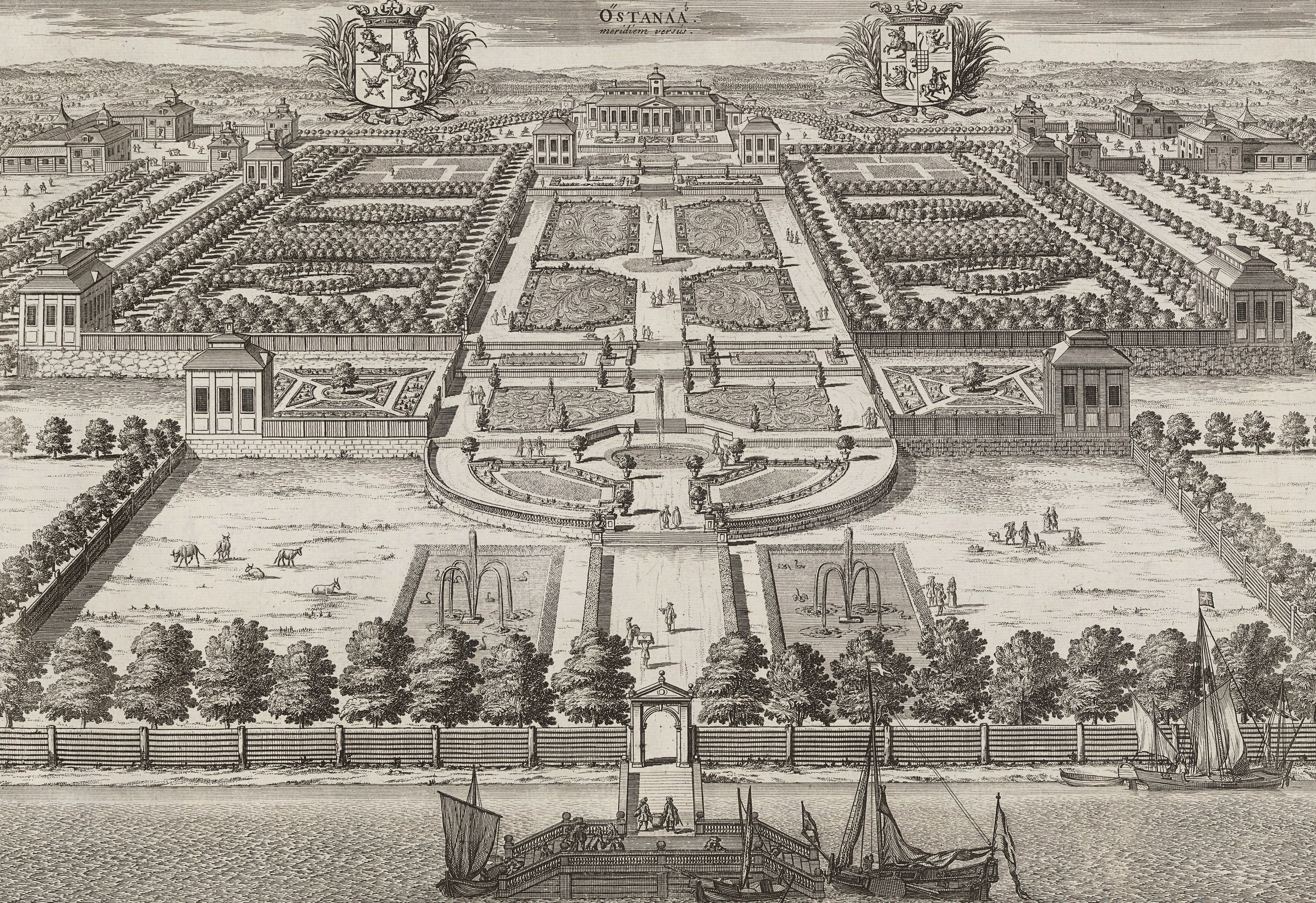
Östanå Castle as depicted in Suecia Antiqua et Hodierna, 1690s. The coat of arms on the top left belongs to Fabian Wrede, and the coat of arms on the right belongs to his wife Brita Cruus af Gudhem.

Wrede was one of the wealthiest individuals in the Swedish Empire, acquiring many estates across both Sweden and Finland. His primary seat was Östanå Castle which he acquired in 1681. For his service to the crown, he was created Count of Östanå on 10 December 1687.

In addition to Östanå, he held several other significant titles and properties:

- Baron of Tjolöholm.
- Lord of Fånö, Häringe, Harviala, Elimä, Harbonäs, Ålhult, and Eksjö-Hofgård.

Wrede married Brita Cruus af Gudhem on 19 May 1672. Brita Cruus was the daughter of Agneta Horn, and the great-granddaughter of Axel Oxenstierna. They had four children:

- Carl Casper Wrede (1673–1701), Royal Chamberlain and Vice Court Marshal. Died unmarried in Laiuse.
- Agneta Wrede (1674–1730), married in 1693 to Axel Johan Lillie.
- Sophia Wrede (1676–1708), married in 1707 to the royal councilor and field marshal Count Erik Sparre af Sundby. Died in childbirth.
- Lars Wrede (1678–1704), Captain of the Life Guards. Died unmarried in Paris.

His sons, Carl Casper and Lars, both predeceased him without children, leading to the extinction of his countly branch of the family upon his death in 1712.

== Death and legacy ==
Wrede died in Stockholm on the night of 6 December 1712. His death marked the extinction of the countly line of Wrede af Elimä. He was initially buried in Jakob's Church before being moved to the Cruus family vault in Björklinge Church in Uppsala County. He is buried next to his wife, Brita Cruus.

A dirge was composed for his burial reflected on his legal knowledge and service to the Swedish Crown:

The reason of his deep soul was a Themis in the North,
his memory was for us a pantry of statutes,
the sea of his tongue could not be poor in words! —
All now lies buried in the black earth.

— Excerpt from his funeral dirge, 1712
