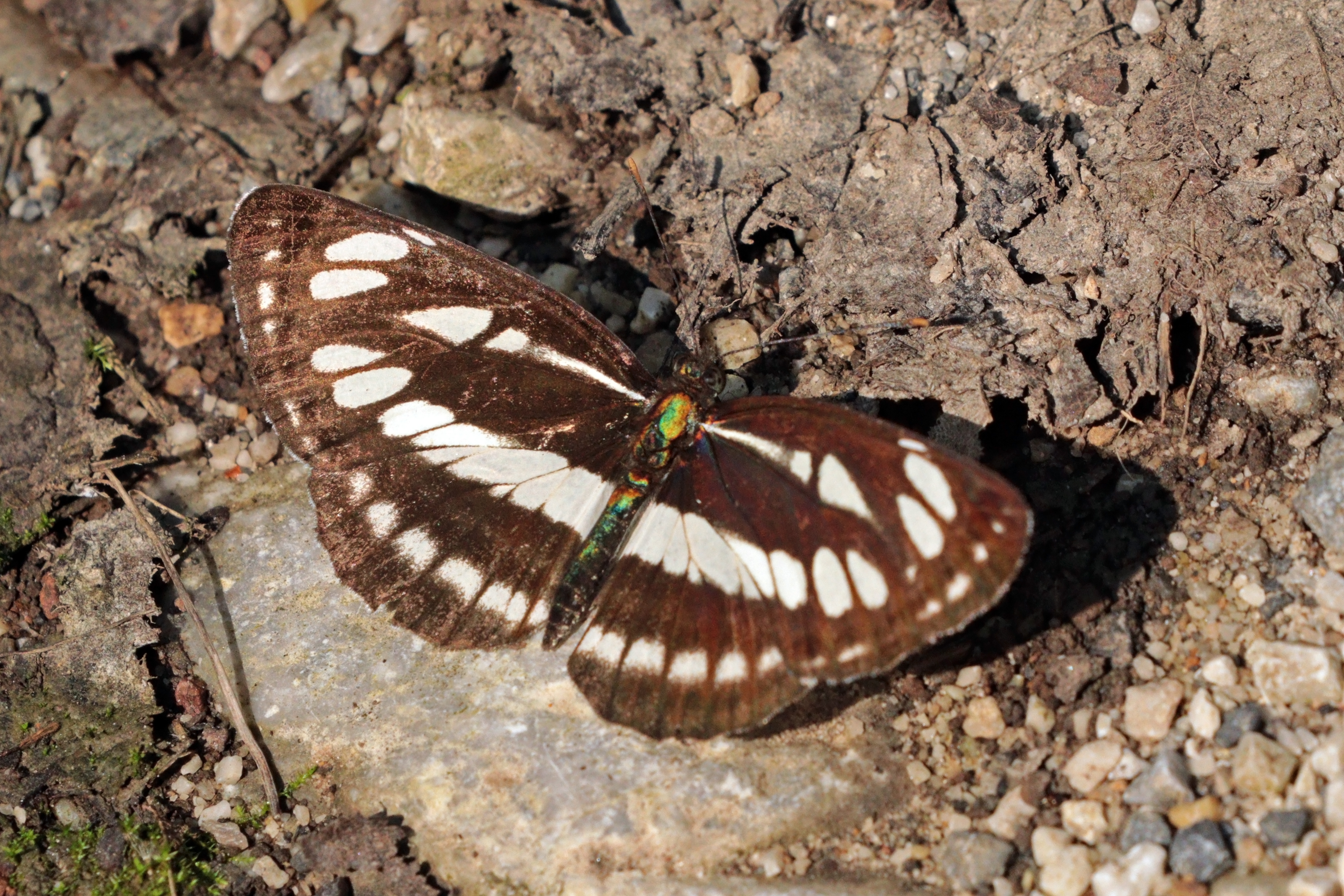
- N. s. sappho, Hungary
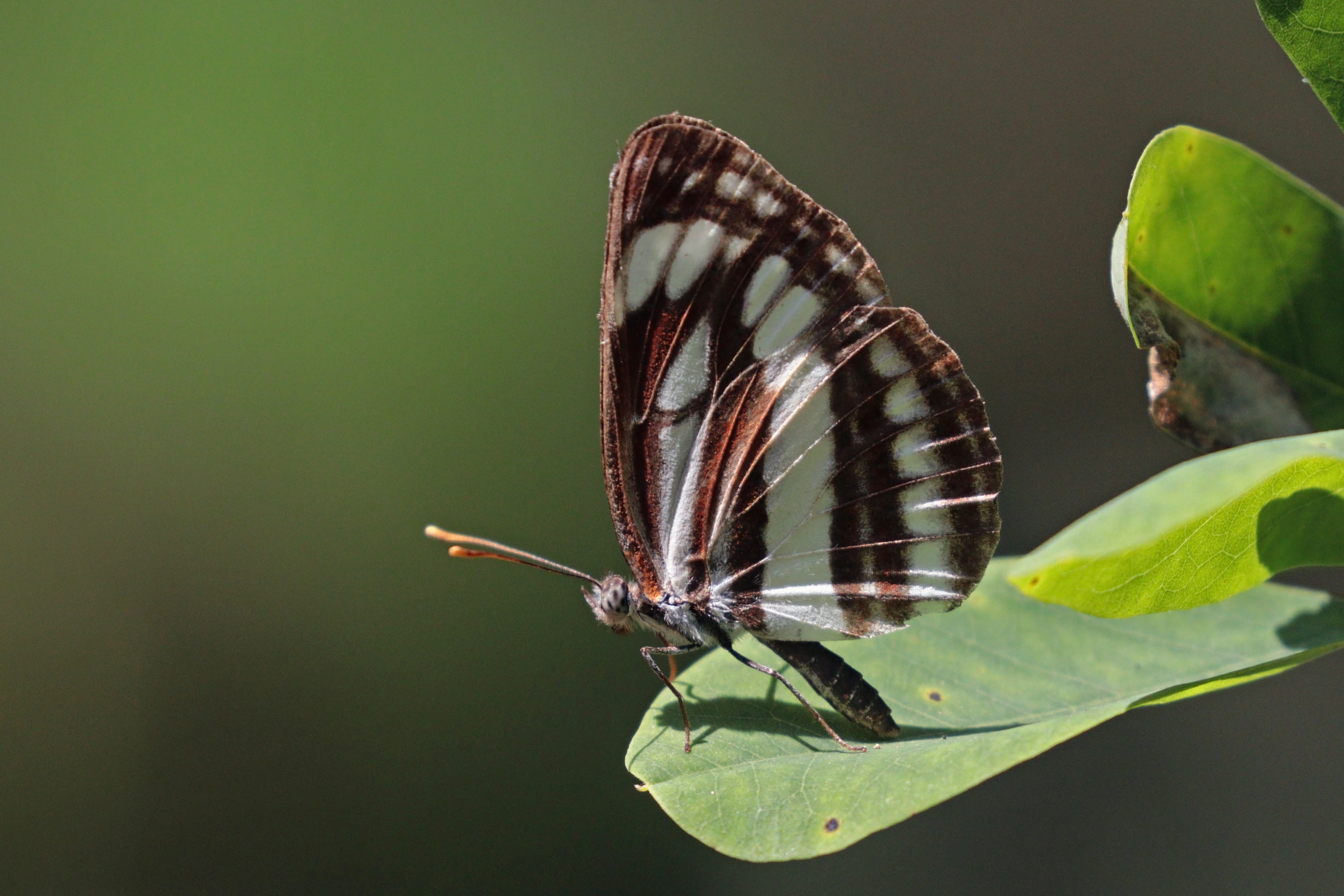
- N. s. sapho, Hungary

Scientific classification
- Kingdom: Animalia
- Phylum: Arthropoda
- Class: Insecta
- Order: Lepidoptera
- Family: Nymphalidae
- Genus: Neptis
- Species: N. sappho

Binomial name
- Neptis sappho Pallas, 1771

Synonyms
- Neptis aceris

= Neptis sappho =

Pallas' sailer

Species of butterfly

Neptis sappho, the Pallas' sailer or common glider, is a nymphalid butterfly found in Central Europe, Russia, India and other parts of temperate Asia and Japan.

The wingspan is 40–46 mm.The upper side of the forewings is black or black-brown in ground colour with a band of white spots. Two white, wedge-shaped spots are also found between the band and the wing base. The underside is rusty brown and otherwise shows the same white markings as the upper side. The upper side of the hind wings is also black or black-brown in colour with a broad inner and a narrow outer band, each white with a white band, which are only broken by the dark veins. In contrast to the very similar Neptis rivularis, the white markings are more extensive and have two rows on the hind wings. The rusty brown underside is slightly lighter than in N. rivularis.

The larvae feed on Lathyrus vernus, Lathyrus niger and Robinia pseudoacacia.

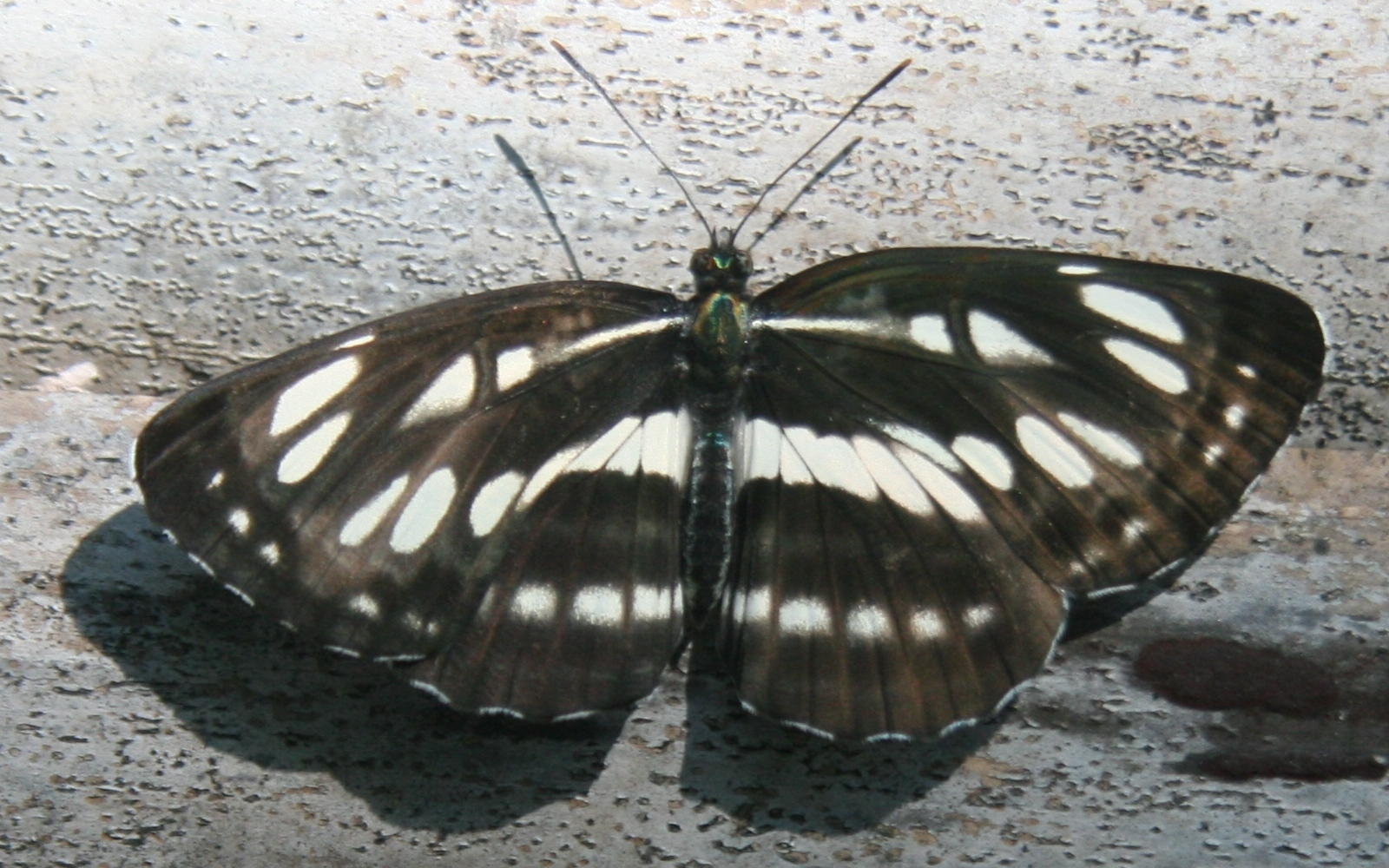
N. s. intermedia Komaki, Aichi, Japan

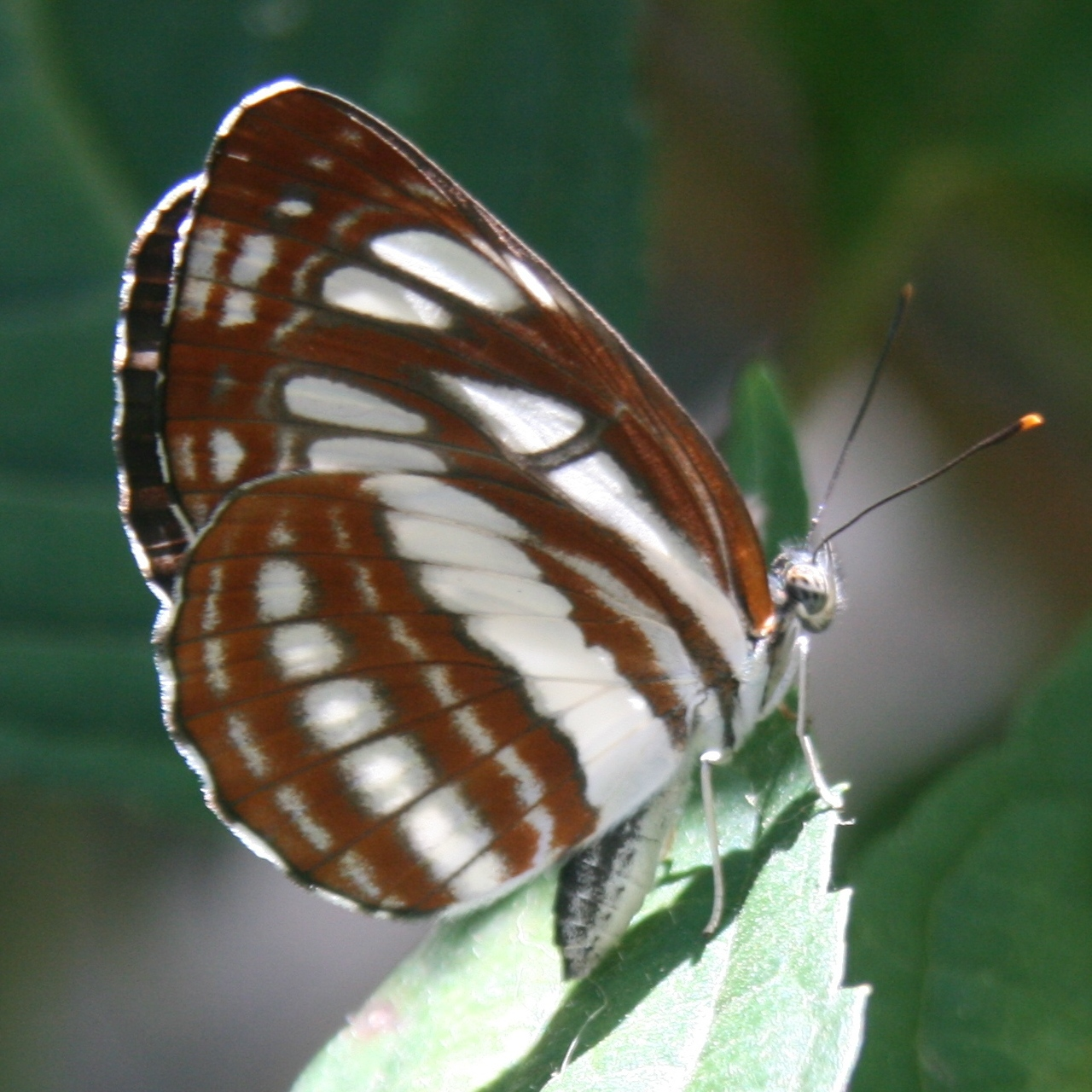
N. s. intermedia Komaki, Aichi, Japan

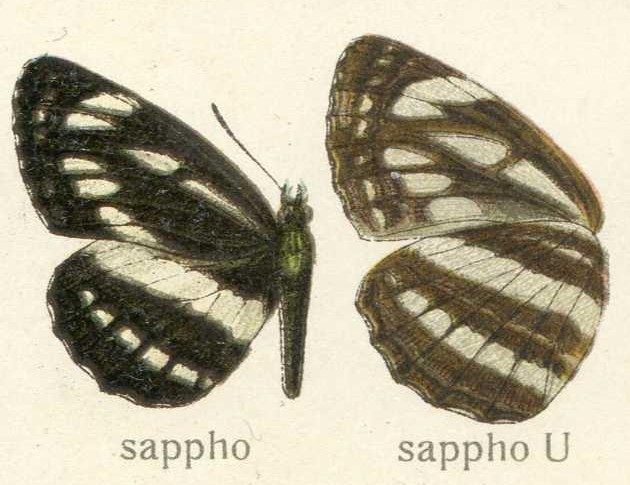
from Adalbert Seitz

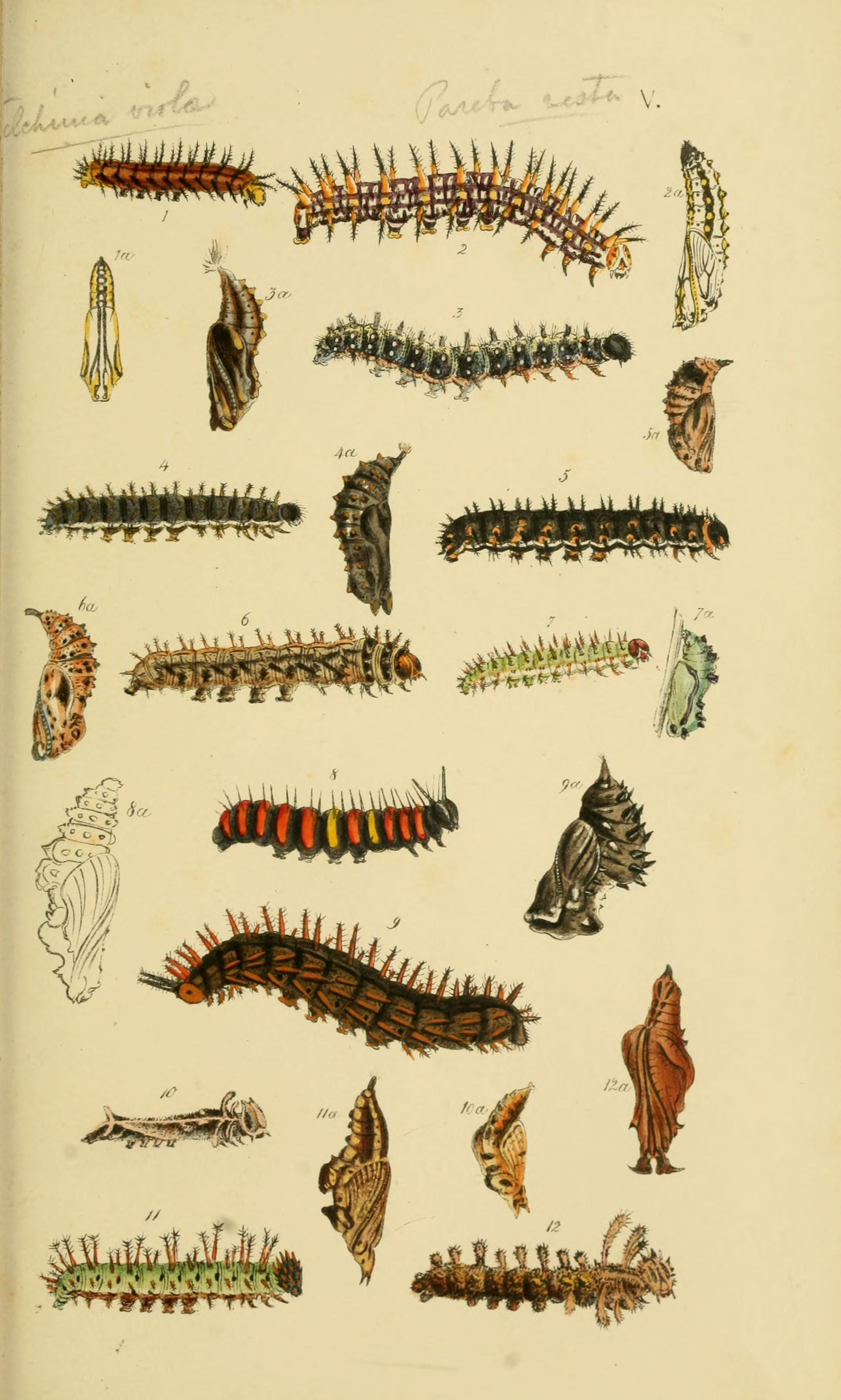
Larva and pupa (figures 10 and 10a)

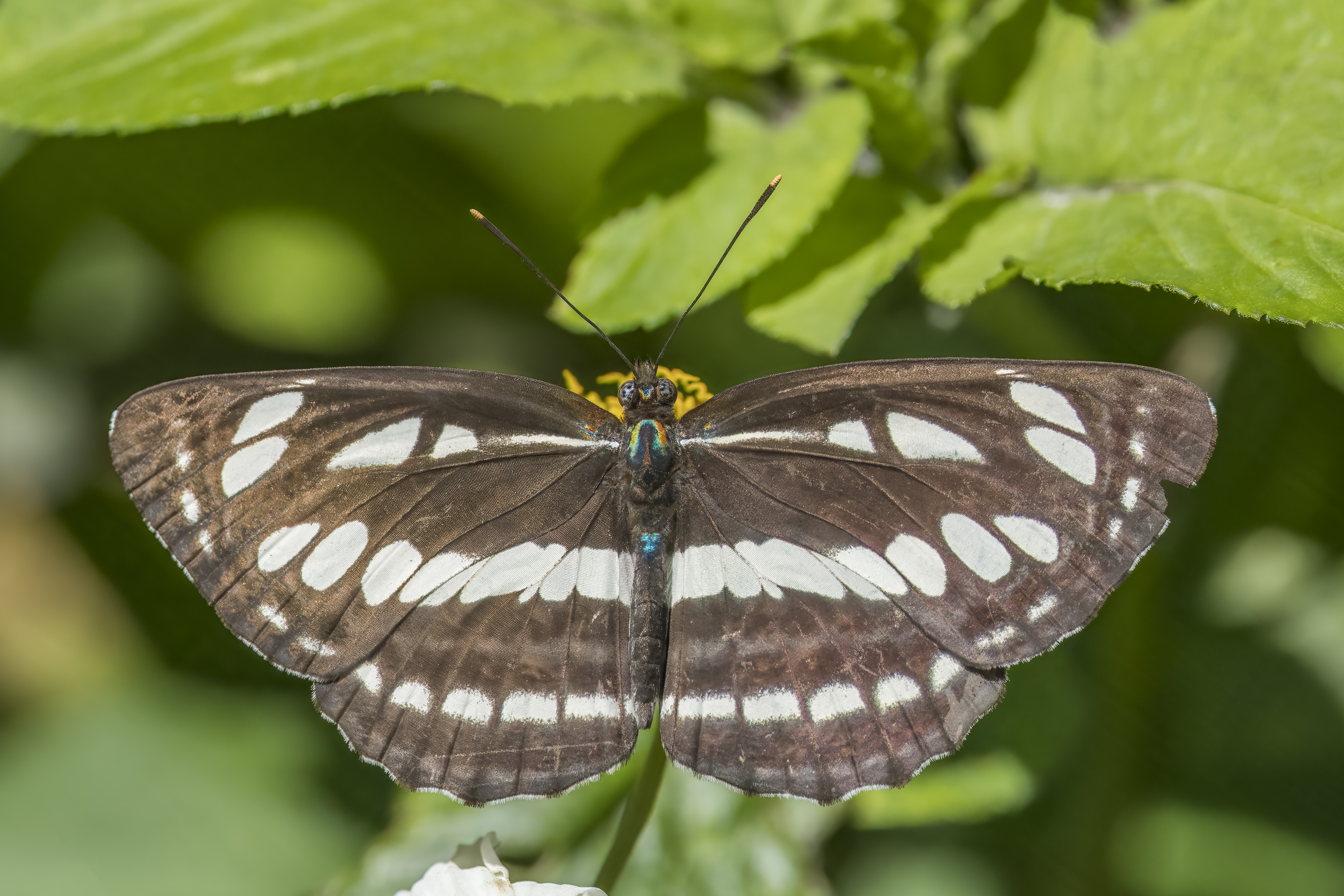
N. s. formosana, Taiwan
