= Kurck =

Finnish noble family

Coat of arms of Arvid Frederick Kurck

The Kurki family or Kurck, also known as the family of Laukko, is a Finnish noble family tracing its lineage back to the late 14th century. It produced several historically prominent persons. The family is usually divided into several lineages, as it continued through female succession.

No one surnamed Kurki who lived in Finland after the 17th century is descended from this family through any kind of proven agnatic lineage. The surname is common in Finland, and has been used by several other former or current unrelated families.

The medieval Kurki family held the manor of Laukko from least the 14th century to the beginning of the 19th century.

A seal of a member of this family is known from the early 15th century. It depicts a common crane, kurki in Finnish. However, the coat of arms of the family, dating from the 15th century, depicts a sword with three stars. This is the coat of arms of a Lady Elin, and was later found in the 1st baron Kurki's coat of arms at the Swedish House of Nobility when the family was given baronial rank in 1652.

In 1797, Arvid Fredrik Kurck (1735–1810) was created a Swedish count, but his branch became extinct.

== Original Kurki family of Tavastia ==
According to folklore, an ancestor of the family Kurki was Matthew Kurki, a legendary chieftain of Pirkka men of the 13th century. Legendary material assign him as the first owner of Laukko. However, before the confiscation of ecclesiastical properties in the 16th century, kings and government did not have lands to grant to speak of, and therefore this idea, having received it from king as reward, in the folklore derives from more modern era. In Middle Ages, people owned usually just inherited lands and lands conquered or assarted by the clan. Landed properties were highly family-committed.

Laukko seems not to have been an immense landholding until made gradually such by the second Kurki family in the 15th century.

The location of the Matthew (Matti) Kurki folklore as itself matches, because Laukko is located in Vesilahti, the historical Pirkkala area, where those folk legends are strongest.

There is a gap of a century between Matti Kurki and the first documented Kurki, deputy lawspeaker Jakob Kurki (Jeppe, Jesper, Jaakko, Jacob) of the late 14th century, whose seat was the manor of Niemenpää in southern Tavastia.

== Medieval Kurki family ==
The heiress of the old Kurki family of Niemenpää married sometime in the late 14th century a nobleman named Herman, of either Swedish or German extraction and using the nickname Svärd, "sword", in accordance with his coat of arms. Of their sons, Nicholas used the nickname Kurki, whereas another son, Peter, seems to have been known as "sword" ("..old lord Peder Swärdh.."). From Peter, owner of Niemenpää, the continuous line holding the lordship of Harviala descends. Nicholas is surmised to have been childless. This however is proven false by an entry in the Diplomataricum Fennicum that clearly mentions a daughter. Several genealogies name him and his wife Cecilia Filipsdotter as the parents of one to three children, among them Jeppe Kurki. Other theories include the descent of Jeppe from a younger kinsman of his (some researchers have estimated that as nephew, be it nephew through a brother or, more probably, a sister). This Jeppe Kurki (Jacob, Jaakko, Jesper) married Karin Klasdotter, daughter of Klas Lydekesson, an important heiress.

The last male of their line was a grandson, Arvid Kurk (1463–1522), who was the last catholic bishop of Turku. Bishop Arvid Klasson Kurk had a sister, Elin Kurk, who was married with Knut Eriksson (Canute Ericsson), lawspeaker of Northern Finland. Elin's son Jöns Knutsson (1503-c 1577) inherited his uncle the bishop Arvid and was the next owner of Laukko and the Kurki patrimony.

This epoch also includes (at least in folklore): Klas Kurk, of the 15th century. He was a nobleman who in the folk ballad Death of Elin burned his (first) wife Elin, whom he believed to have been unfaithful and given birth to a son of another man. The poem however is either fictive or possibly persons are mixed.

== Noble, ultimately baronial family Kurki, in Sweden known as Kurck ==
Elin Klasdotter, sister of bishop Arvid Kurk, and heiress of the medieval Kurki family, is the ancestress of the next male-line family that used the surname Kurki. The Swedish formulation of the name – Kurck – was manifested as the family was registered under that name in 1625 at the Swedish House of Nobility when that institution was established.

Lady Elin's father was lord Klas Jeppesson Kurk. Her husband was lawspeaker Knut Eriksson (died in 1539 at great age), a member of the Privy Council of Sweden and since 1511 lagman of Northern Finland (Elgenstierna gives him as a scion of the Smålandic family of petty gentry holding the manor of Näs; but Gillingstam opines him being of Finnic extraction).

Elin's son Jöns Knutsson Kurck (1503-c 1577) was also member of the royal council (PC) and his father's successor as lawspeaker. The family continues through a son of Jöns' second marriage with Ingeborg Tott:

- Canute Jönsson (died 1598). His wife was Bridget Benedictsdotter of the Gylta family, who inherited the Hedensö manor in Näshulta, Södermanland. That manor became the Kurki family's seat in Sweden.

Colonel Axel Kurck 1555–1630 was a soldier whom revolting Cudgel men (nuijamiehet) wanted to make their chief, but he did not consent. Axel became later military governor of the entire Finland.

Jöns Kurck (1590–1652), member of the Royal Council and president of Court of Appeals of Turku, was created friherre (baron) in 1652, and he started the baronial family that survived to the 20th century. The baronial Kurck family held the Laukko manor yet over a century, but settled chiefly in Sweden in the area of Stockholm, because they were of high nobility and often among the important officials of the kingdom.

The unmarried baron Axel Gustav Kurck (1728–1800) established Laukko as a fideicommiss for agnates of the Kurck family.

Arvid Fredrik Kurck (1735–1810) was in 1797 created count but did not bother to register it at the Swedish House of Nobility. He succeeded in 1800 as owner of Laukko fideicommiss.

His distant cousin and successor, baron Klas Arvid Kurck (1769–1834), Lord Justice of the Supreme Court of Sweden, and Lord President of the Chamber Court of Sweden (the supreme administrative court), had to sell (ultimately in 1817) the ancestral manor of Laukko when Finland had become a separate grand duchy attached to Russian Empire, because the Kurck family wanted to stay in Sweden, and the Finnish government did not allow foreigners to possess landed properties.

Baron Klaus Arvid's only son's only son, Dr. Phil, baron Klas Karl Gustav Kurck (1849–1937), cultural historian, was the last legitimate agnate of this Kurck family. Female-line descendants of the baronial lineage live, mostly in Sweden, including branches of families von Friesendorff, Stjernswärd, Wrede, von Nolcken, and Procopé.

== Royal descendants ==
The current king of the Kingdom of the Netherlands, Willem-Alexander (born 1967), Prince of Orange, descends paternally, through a female line, after 500 years, from each of the three above-mentioned Finnish families of Kurck. This is because one ancestress of Willem-Alexander has been countess Eva Horn (1653–1740), wife of Reichsgraf Nicholas Bielke, lord of the Finnish barony of Korpo, and daughter of the Finnish field marshal Gustav Horn (1592–1657), Count of Pori, the Lord High Constable of Sweden. The Horn counts of Pori, Finland descend, through the Porvoo-originated owners of the manor of Sydänmaa, from a daughter of the abovementioned lady Elin Klasdotter, heiress of the Kurck of Laukko, and her husband lawspeaker Knut Eriksson. Lady Elin, as explained above, descended from the medieval Kurck of Laukko family and from the Kurck of Niemenpää family (and was their heiress), and of course all her descendants so descend too.

== Sources ==
- Äldre svenska frälsesläkter by Folke Wernstedt, 1965 (deals with the family of Arvi Kurki and the Svärd family)
- Svenska adelns ättartavlor by Gustaf Elgenstierna, 1925 (1998 edition) – deals with the baronial Kurck family
- W. W. van Valkenburg, De voorouders van Z.K.H. Prins Claus, Prins der Nederlanden, Ned. Leeuw Feb/March 1966.
- Suvanto, Seppo; Mäkelä-Alitalo, Anneli (13 October 2004). "Kurki (1300 - 2000)". Finnish National Biography (via Biografiasampo).
- "Kurck, släkter". Svenskt Biografiskt Lexikon. 1975–1977.
