= Agneta Wrede =

Swedish noblewoman (1674-1730)

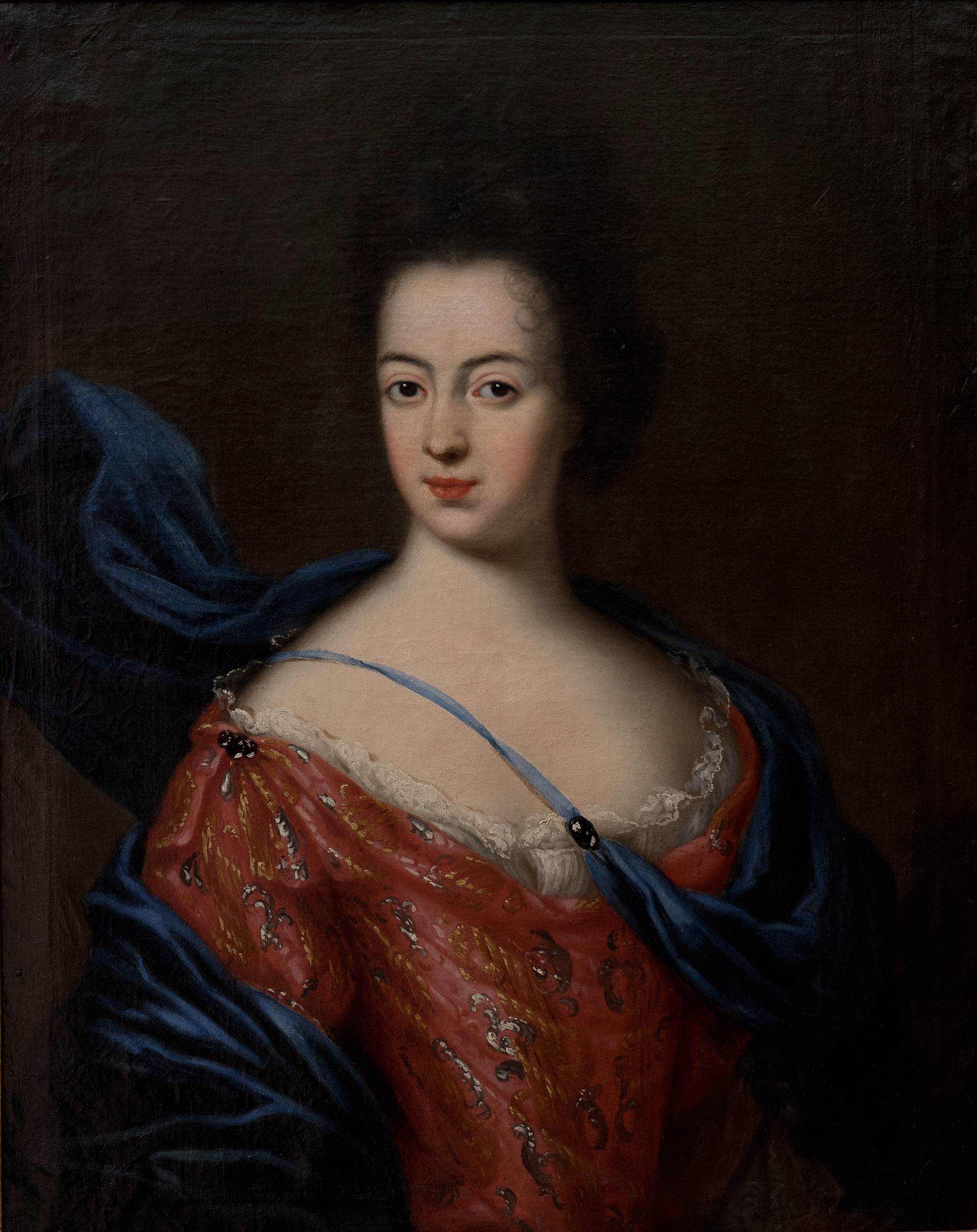
- Portrait of Agneta Wrede by David Klöcker Ehrenstrahl (1692).
- Born: 12 November 1674; Stockholm, Sweden
- Died: 23 July 1730 (aged 55); Lövstad Castle, Östergötland
- Noble family: Wrede
- Spouse: Axel Johan Lillie (m. 1693)
- Issue: Hedvig Catharina De la Gardie
- Father: Fabian Wrede
- Mother: Brita Cruus af Gudhem
- Occupation: Landowner, philanthropist

Agneta Wrede (12 November 1674 – 23 July 1730) was a Swedish noble and landowner. She was a member of the Wrede family, and the Lillie family.

== Biography ==
Agneta Wrede was born on 12 November 1674, in Stockholm to Count Fabian Wrede and Brita Cruus. She was named for her maternal grandmother, Agneta Horn. She was the second child of the couple, and she had two brothers and a sister, all of her siblings would not live past 30.

In 1693, she married count Axel Johan Lillie, and had her daughter Hedvig Catharina De la Gardie with him in 1695.

After the early death of her husband in 1696, Wrede remained a widow for 34 years. Her brothers, Carl Casper and Lars Wrede, both died young without issue while serving in the military, leaving Agneta as the steward of both families vast wealth and properties.

Wrede was a highly capable administrator, overseeing many estates including Lövstad Castle and Häringe Castle.

Wrede died in 1730 at Lövstad Castle after drinking water from Medevi. She is buried in the Lillie vault in Kimstad Church.

== Religion and philanthropy ==
Wrede was a regular attendee at Klara Church in Stockholm, where she funded the construction of the southern entrance and a stone staircase in 1726. These features still bear the carved coats of arms and initials of the Wrede and Lillie families.

In 1699, Wrede applied for jus patronatus - the right to appoint the vicar of the parish for Kimstad Church, the parish church for Lövstad. In 1700, the pastor of Kimstad Parish submitted a formal complaint to the Cathedral chapter (domkapitlet), regarding the then 26-year old Countess. The complaint stated that Wrede demanded private household sermons on her estate, as well as the performance of baptisms and weddings outside the parish church. Furthermore, she insisted that the Sunday congregation delay the start of services until she had arrived at church. The pastor argued these demands exceeded church laws.

She managed the Wrede Bursaries at Uppsala University, which were 10,000 silver coins which were donated to the school by her mother. She also built and maintained hospitals.

== Legacy ==
Wrede is credited with restoring the De la Gardie family's prestige. By marrying her daughter, Hedvig Catharina Lillie, to Count Magnus Julius De la Gardie, she enriched a family that had been financially ruined by her father, Fabian Wrede during the Great Reduction.
