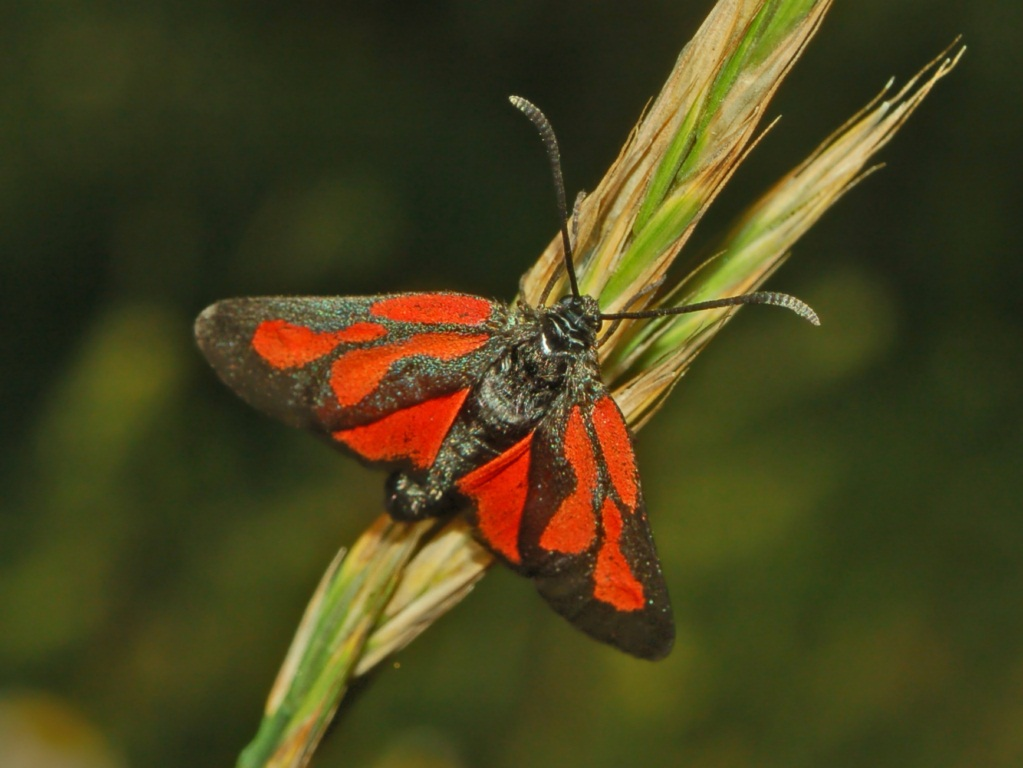

Scientific classification
- Domain: Eukaryota
- Kingdom: Animalia
- Phylum: Arthropoda
- Class: Insecta
- Order: Lepidoptera
- Family: Zygaenidae
- Genus: Zygaena
- Species: Z. osterodensis

Binomial name
- Zygaena osterodensis Reiss, 1921

Synonyms
- Zygaena scabiosae Scheven, 1777

= Zygaena osterodensis =

Species of moth

Zygaena osterodensis is a moth of the family Zygaenidae.

== Subspecies ==
Subspecies:

- Z. o. osterodensis
- Z. o. curvata Burgeff, 1926
- Z. o. eupyrenaea Burgeff, 1926
- Z. o. koricnensis Reiss, 1922
- Z. o. mentzeri G. & H. Reiss, 1972
- Z. o. osterodensis Reiss, 1921
- Z. o. saccarella Balletto & Toso, 1978
- Z. o. schultei Dujardin, 1956
- Z. o. trimacula Le Charles, 1957
- Z. o. valida Burgeff, 1926
- Z. o. validior (Burgeff, 1926)

== Distribution ==
This species can be found in continental Europe, Russia included, except the south of the Iberian Peninsula and southern Italy, Greece and Great Britain, Denmark and northern Scandinavia. It reaches Asia Minor, the Caucasus and Lake Baikal.

== Habitat ==
These moths live in the lowlands and in mountainous areas in sunny forest paths and in deciduous forests, at an elevation of 200–1,300 metres (660–4,270 ft) above sea level.

== Description ==
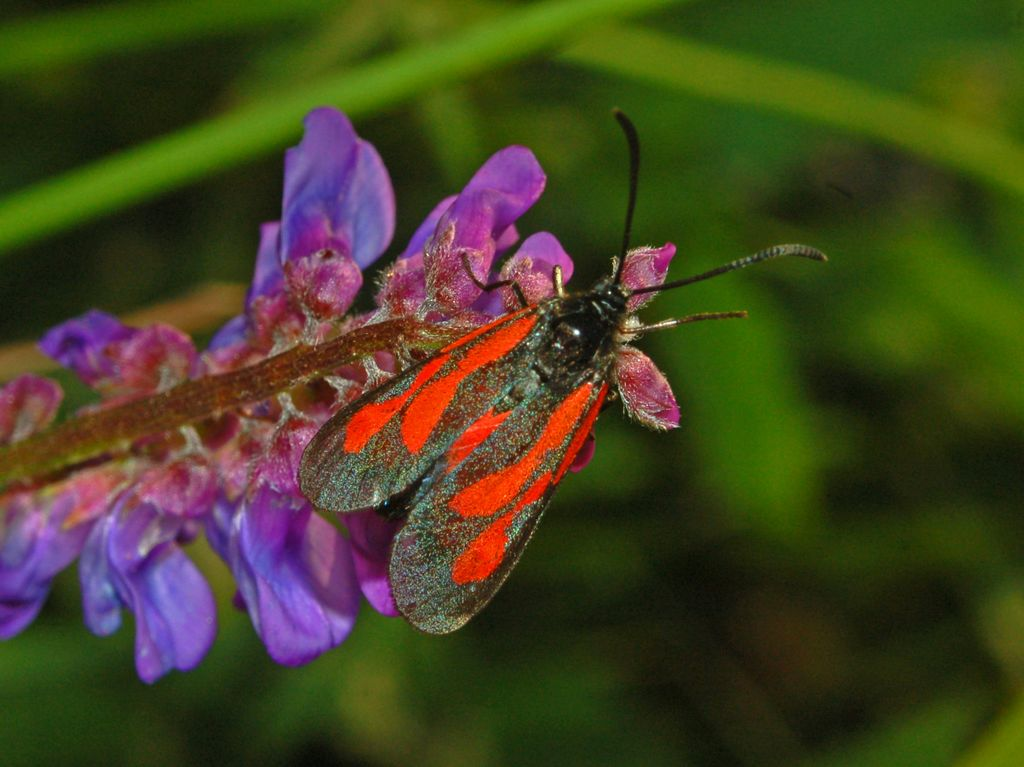
Zygaena osterodensis on Vicia cracca

The wingspan is about 35 mm. The color of body and forewings is black, with red patches almost always confluent into each other forming two parallel stripes. Moroeover in the apex of the forewings is pointed.

The caterpillars are about 20 millimeters long. They have a light gray-turquoise ground color, with large black spots.

This species is very similar to Zygaena romeo.

== Biology ==
The caterpillars are found from August and after hibernation until May of the following year. They mainly feed on the leaves of Vicia cracca and Lathyrus vernus. Adults are on wing in June and July. They fly during the day.

== Bibliography ==
- Michael Chinery, Insectes de France et d'Europe occidentale, Paris, Flammarion, août 2012, 320 p. (ISBN 978-2-0812-8823-2), p. 134-135

== Bibliography ==
- Šašić, Martina; Nahirnić, Ana; Tarmann, Gerhard M. (2016-12-31). "Zygaenidae (Lepidoptera) in the Lepidoptera collections of the Croatian Natural History Museum". Natura Croatica: Periodicum Musei Historiae Naturalis Croatici. 25 (2): 233–248. doi:10.20302/NC.2016.25.19. eISSN 1848-7386.
