= Lordship of Harviala =

Medieval possession in Finland

Lordship of the Manor of Harviala was a medieval frälse possession in Finland.

== Property ==
Harviala has been an immense property in Southern Häme (Tavastia) in Finland. The manor and the seat of lordship were in Vanaja.

Holders of the property were hereditary, and through at least ten generations, they were mighty regional magnates in Tavastia. Highly probably, the family was of ancient Finnish extraction and had formed some power base already in mists of history. Earlier holders of Harviala are not known to our days.

== Dynasty of Harviala ==
1) Royal Councillor John, son of Andrew, of the family of Karppi (in Swedish, Jöns Andersson Garp), is mentioned as member of the Privy Council of Sweden from 1396 onwards. In Tavastia, he owned much property, for example the manor of Lepistö. One of his ancestors may have come from Germany. His family's other ancestors were from mists of history magnates in Finnish Tavastia.

2) Christina Jönsdotter of Karppi, wed to Nicholas (Klas) Lydekason, bailiff of the Turku castle, of German, possibly Muenster, extraction, and whose family became known as Djäkn or Djekn

3) Bridget Klasdotter, heiress of Suontaka in Tyrväntö, wed to Henry Sword (Heikki Swärth, Henrik Svärd), member of the Privy Council of Sweden, of the house of Kurki of Laukko and Niemenpää, Lord of Harviala and Niemenpää

4) Ragnhild Henriksdotter (Svärd) m Hans Pedersson of Lepas

5) Nicholas (Niilo, Klaus Hansson), married with a woman whose name is unknown to our age, but who possibly belonged to the family of Särkilahti of Taivassalo, in the Turku archipelago

6) Bridget of Harviala, Pirjo Klauntytär, wed to Lasse Matson, district judge of Hattula, was childless. Harviala passed to her brother:

Bero of Lepas (died 1584), Bero Nicolai de Finlandia (Björn Klasson av Lepas), member of Privy Council of Sweden since 1523. His wife was Karin of the family bearing the Stiernsköld (starred shield), from Sweden.

7) Anna of Lepaa, heiress of Harviala, wed to Mats Larsson, lawspeaker of Northern Finland, of the family of Kruse

8) Jesper Mattsson Cruus af Harfwila, and af Edeby, PC, Lord High Treasurer of Sweden. His wife was baroness Brita De la Gardie, daughter of baron Pontus De La Gardie and Sofia Gyllenhielm. Brita's mother Sofia was the illegitimate daughter of king John III of Sweden with Karin Hansdotter.

9) Baron Lawrence, Lars Jespersson Cruus af Edeby, Lord of Harviala, younger son of Jeppe and Brita. Sir Lawrence was created Baron of Gudhem (Cruus af Gudhem). He held property which belonged together to him and daughters of his early-deceased elder brother sir John.

Baron Lawrence married countess Agneta Horn, daughter of the Count of Pori. In division of inheritances, their son did not receive Finnish properties, which were assigned to various daughters and nieces.

Of Lawrence and Agneta's daughters, baroness Bridget (Brita Cruus) married count Fabian Wrede, Count of Östanå. Baroness Anna married baron Klaus Hermansson Flemingin, baron of Liebelitz.

10) Lawrence's fraternal nieces married as follows:

1. baroness Bridget (Birgitta Johansdotter) with baron Jacob Lilliehöök
2. baroness Anna Maria with HRR Reichsgraf Karl Mauritz Lewenhaupt, count of Razeburg and Falkenstein
3. baroness Barbro: first with count Charles Sparre (Carl Carlsson Sparre af Söfdeborg); and second with count Gustav Oxenstierna, count of Korsholm and Vaasa
4. baroness Sophia Christina with baron Gustav Banér.

On the other hand, the Kruse family became extinct in male line upon the death of baron Lawrence's grandson. The Harviala lands passed entirely to heirs listed above.

== Sources ==
- Äldre svenska frälsesläkter, by Folke Wernstedt, 1965
- Svenska adelns ättartavlor, by Gustaf Elgenstierna, 1925 (1998 edition)
