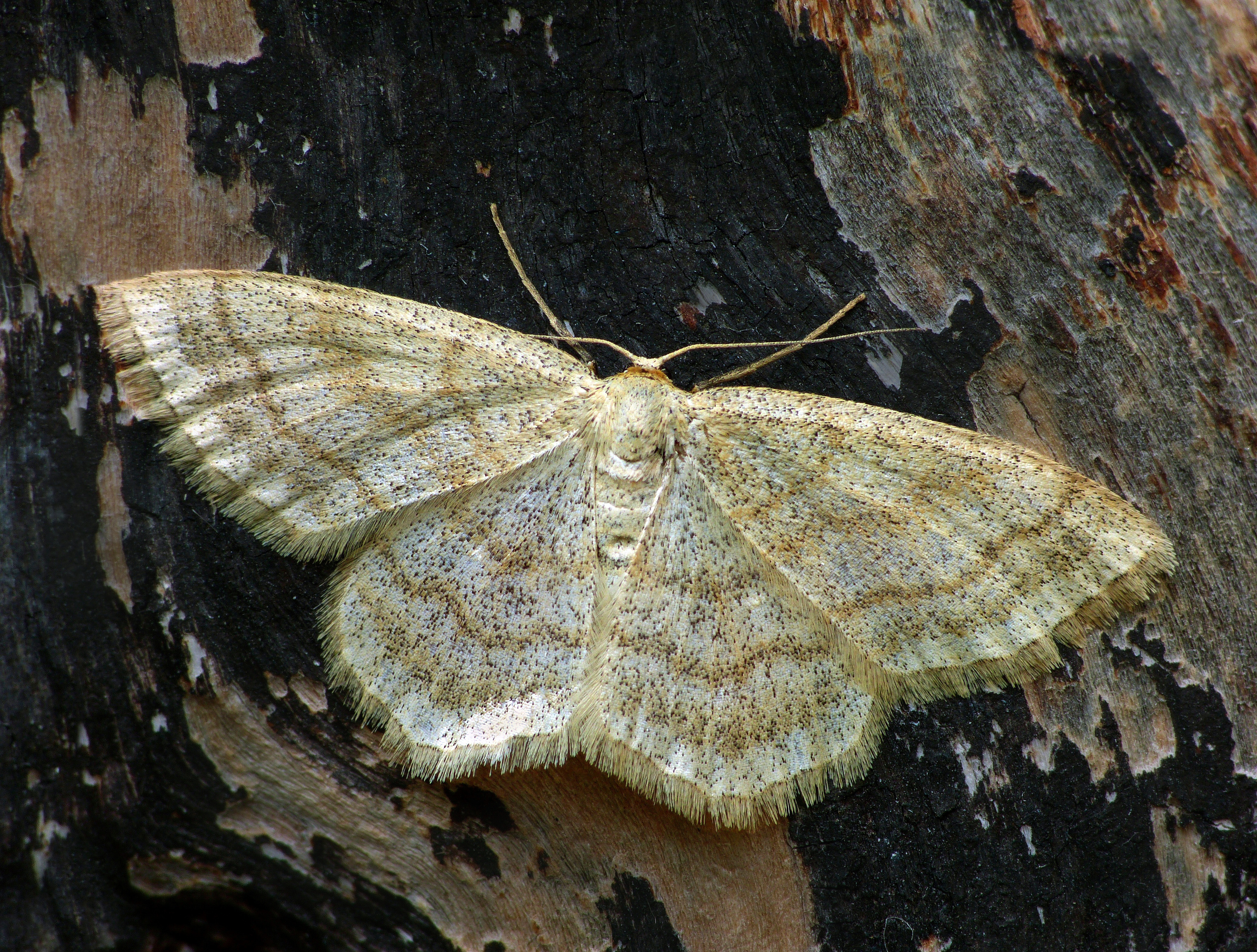

Scientific classification
- Kingdom: Animalia
- Phylum: Arthropoda
- Class: Insecta
- Order: Lepidoptera
- Family: Geometridae
- Genus: Scopula
- Species: S. ternata

Binomial name
- Scopula ternata Schrank, 1802

Synonyms
- Phalaena ternata Schrank, 1802; Scopula aequicerata Träff, 1965; Acidalia commutaria Boisduval, 1840; Idaea commutata Freyer, 1832; Acidalia fumata Stephens, 1831; Acidalia gypsaria Boisduval, 1840; Acidalia nitidaria Boisduval, 1840; Cabera saltuata Speyer, 1839; Larentia simplaria Freyer, 1852

= Scopula ternata =

Species of geometer moth in subfamily Sterrhinae

Scopula ternata, the smoky wave, is a moth of the family Geometridae. It was described by Franz von Paula Schrank in 1802. It is mainly found in northern and parts of central Europe and in isolated populations in southern and south-eastern Europe. Its western range is eastern France, eastern Belgium and Scotland, with an isolated population in the Pyrenees. In the north its range extends to the polar regions and in the south it is found up to the Alps. Its eastern range extends through central and northern Russia up to the Ural, through Siberia up to the Yenisei River.

The wingspan is 24–29 millimetres (0.94–1.14 in) for males and 21–25 millimetres (0.83–0.98 in) for females. The base color is pale brown to pale yellowish with grey dusting. Usually the males are more intensely dusted than the females. The cross-lines are developed with little contrast. The inner transverse line is often almost completely extinguished. The middle band and outer transverse line, on the other hand, are usually present, the outer transverse line is usually the most strongly developed. Rarely is also the wavy line pronounced, the marginal line can be indicated in the female by interrupted stripes. Discal spots are missing on the front and rear wings. See also Prout.

The egg is approximately cylindrical with flattened ends. The outside has 17 to 18 longitudinal ribs, which intersect with finer cross ribs. It is initially light yellow and later stained red.

The caterpillar is relatively long and slender, and has a lateral skin fold. It is reddish-grey and has a double, dark but interrupted dorsal line. It is slightly wider in the segment incisions. Furthermore, a wide sideline is very striking.

The moth flies from May to July in the warmer regions and from June to August in Northern Europe.

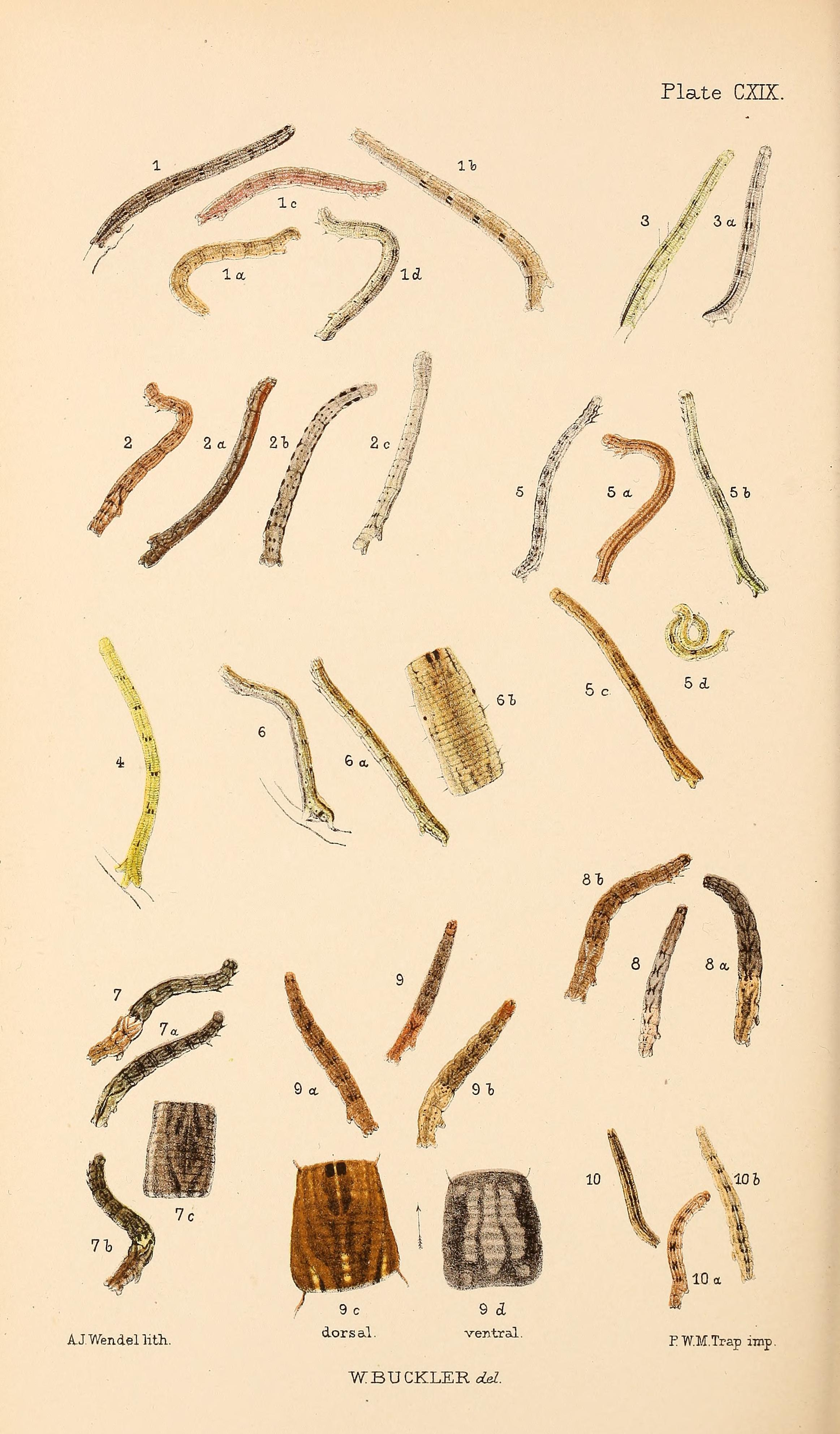
3,3a larvae after final moult

The larva preferably feeds on Vaccinium myrtillus, Vaccinium uliginosum, Calluna vulgaris, Lathyrus niger, Salix repens and Erica. Less frequently, they have been recorded on Lonicera tatarica, Stellaria, Polygonum aviculare, Fragaria vesca, Lactuca sativa and Taraxacum officinale.
