= Henrik Wrede =

Livonian knight

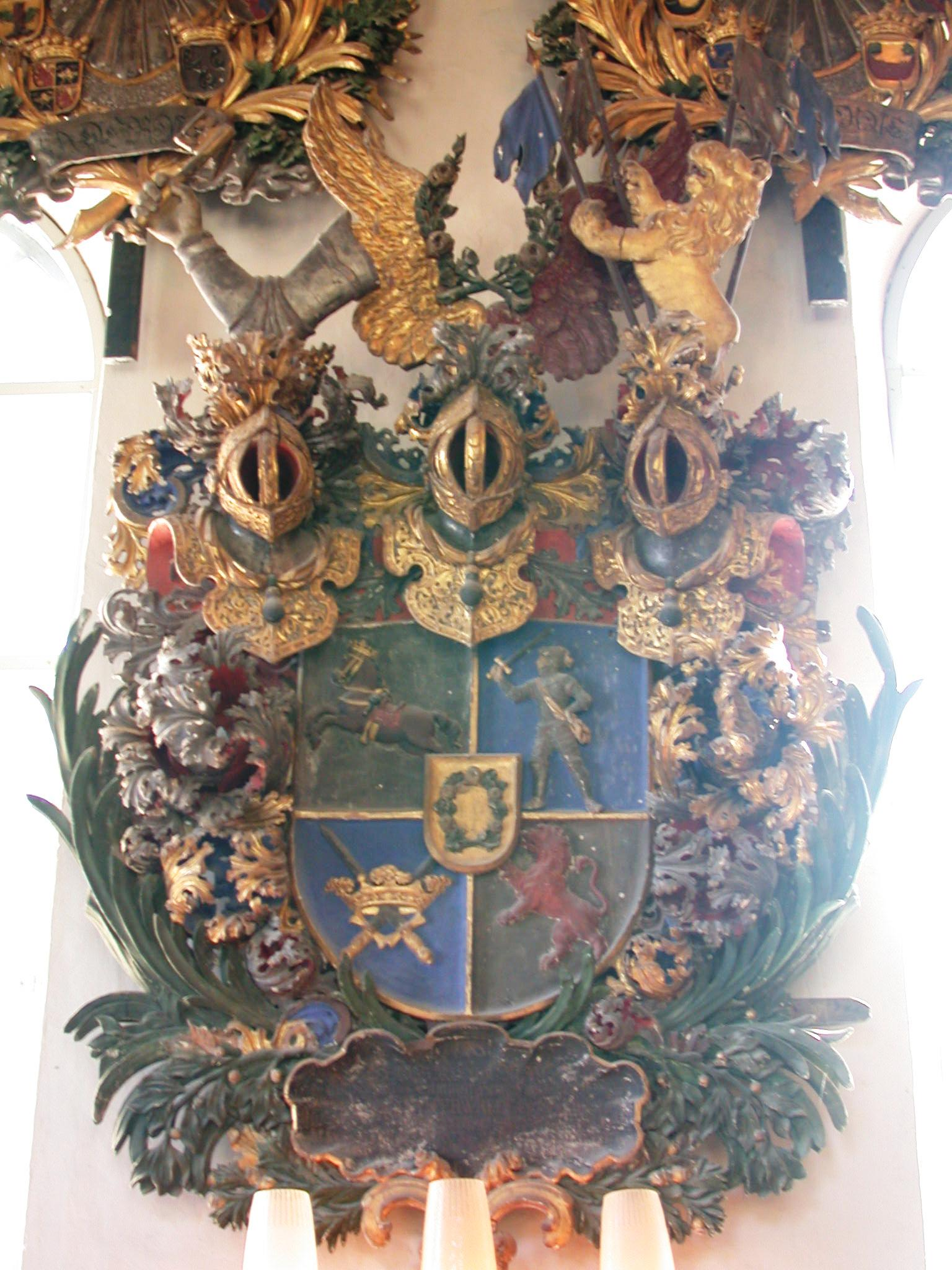
- Wrede's coat of arms in Björklinge Church, Uppsala.
- Born: Livonia
- Died: 27 September 1605; Kircholm, Duchy of Livonia
- Relatives: Wrede family
- Military career
- Allegiance: (yes) Swedish Empire
- Branch: Cavalry
- Rank: Rittmeister
- Known for: Saving the life of Charles IX of Sweden
- Conflicts: Polish–Swedish War (1600–1611); Battle of Kircholm †

Heinrich (Henrik) Wrede (died 27 September [O.S. 17 September] 1605, Kircholm) was a Baltic-German cavalry officer in the Swedish army, remembered for his role in the Battle of Kircholm which took place during the Polish–Swedish War (1600–1611), where he sacrificed his life to save Charles IX of Sweden. He is the progenitor of the Finnish-Swedish branch of the noble Wrede family, the Wrede af Elimä.

== Early life and family ==
Wrede was born to a Baltic-German noble family in Livonia. His parents were Caspar Wrede, a squire in service to the Teutonic Order and his mother was Könna Henrichintytär von Kropp.

== Military career ==
Wrede joined the Swedish cavalry during the Polish–Swedish War (1600–1611). He rose to the rank of Rittmeister.

== Battle of Kircholm ==
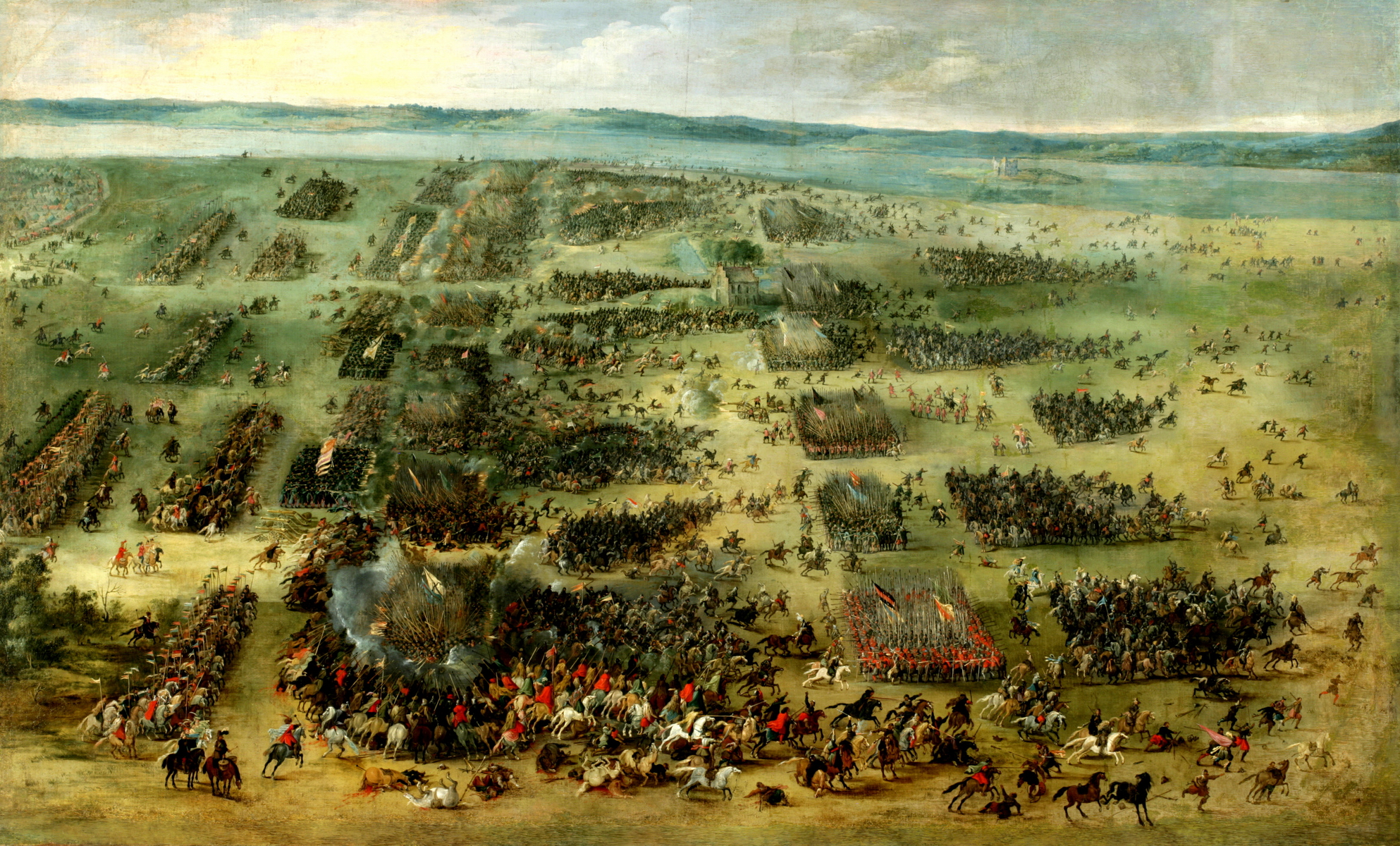
The Battle of Kircholm (1605) by Pieter Snayers

In September 1605, Wrede participated in the Battle of Kircholm, where a smaller Polish-Lithuanian cavalry force defeated the larger Swedish army personally led by Charles IX. During the Swedes retreat, Charles IX's horse was shot and killed. As Charles IX was about to be surrounded by Polish cavalry, Wrede arrived and offered the king his own horse. The king managed to escape on Wrede's horse, but Wrede was left stranded. He was subsequently surrounded and killed.

== Personal life ==
Wrede married Gertrud von Ungern (d. 1649), daughter of Fabian Jurgensson von Ungern and Gertrud Georgsdotter von dem Wolde..

He had two children:

- Casper Wrede (d.1654), Baron and military officer.
- Carl Henrik Wrede (d.1667), Baron and Governor of Turku..

Some notable grandchildren of his were statesman Fabian Wrede, Count of Östanå and military officer Fabian Wrede (1654–1709).

== Legacy ==
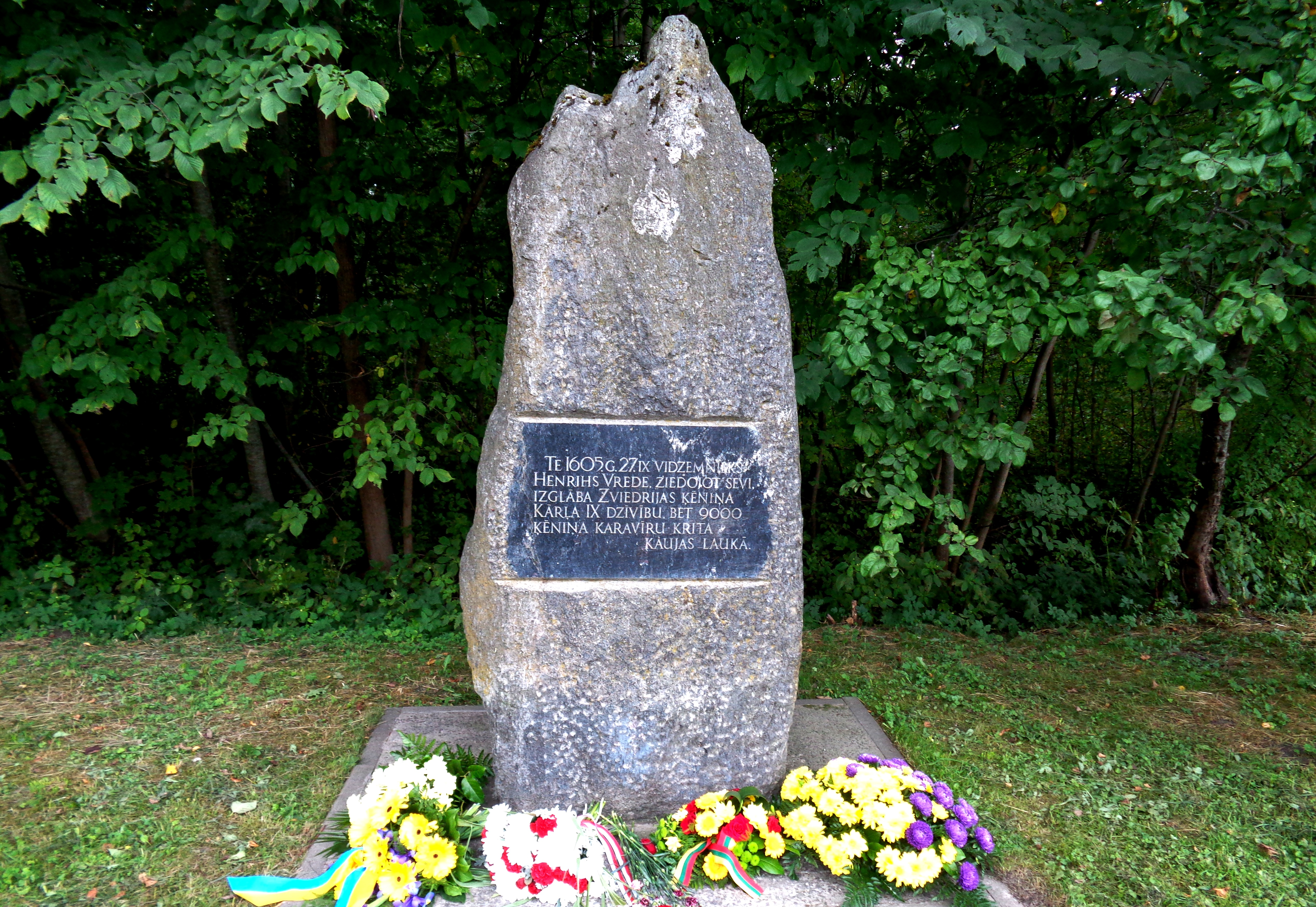
A memorial stone in Salaspils (formerly Kircholm), Latvia, commemorating Henrik Wrede's sacrifice.

As a token of gratitude, Charles granted his widow Gertrud von Ungern and her children a perpetual lease of Elimäki, as well as land in Porvoo and Mäntsälä. The lease also gave them the right to build manor homes wherever they pleased many of which remained with the family for centuries.

In 1654, Queen Christina raised Wrede's two sons, Casper and Carl Henrik Wrede, to the rank of Baron (Friherre) as a posthumous reward for their father's actions. The latter of whom would become the governor of Turku.
