= Häringe Palace =

Former manor house in Södermanland, Sweden

Coordinates: 59°02′21″N 18°00′51″E

- Haninge Municipality, Sweden
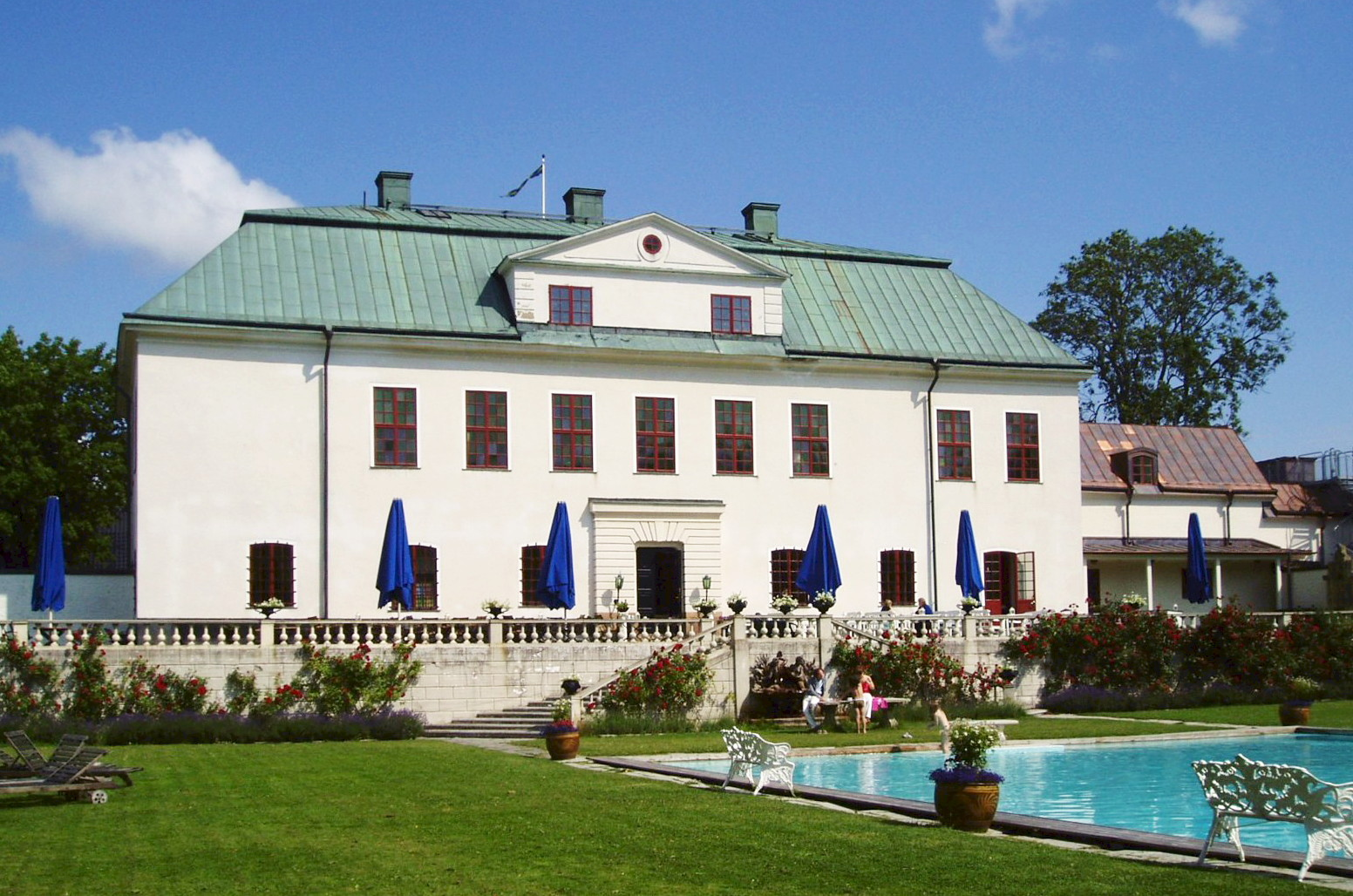
- Häringe slott

Site information
- Type: Manor House
- Owner: Bianca Karlberg
- Open to the public: Yes

Häringe Palace (Häringe slott) is a former manor house in Södermanland, Sweden. It is located about 35 km south of Stockholm and lies within the Häringe-Hammersta Nature Reserve.

== History ==
The current main building was built on the initiative of Gustav Horn, Count of Pori (1592–1657) and was completed in 1657. After Gustaf Horn's death, the manor was inherited by their daughter Agneta Horn (1629–1672). Häringe was inherited by Agneta Horn's granddaughter Agneta Wrede in 1696 and in 1730 by her daughter Hedvig Catharina De la Gardie (1695–1745) wife of Magnus Julius De la Gardie. In 1745 it was acquired by their youngest son of Count Carl Julius De la Gardie (1729–1786). The property was purchased in 1769 by Major General Fabian Löwen (1699–1773).

In the 1930s, the castle was renovated and modernized by engineer and industrialist Torsten Kreuger (1884–1973). Since 2017, the facility has been owned by businessman Veselin Vesko Mijač, who operates it as a hotel and conference center.

== See also ==
- List of castles and manor houses in Sweden
- Södermanland Runic Inscription 239
