= Wrede =

Coat of Arms of Princes of Wrede

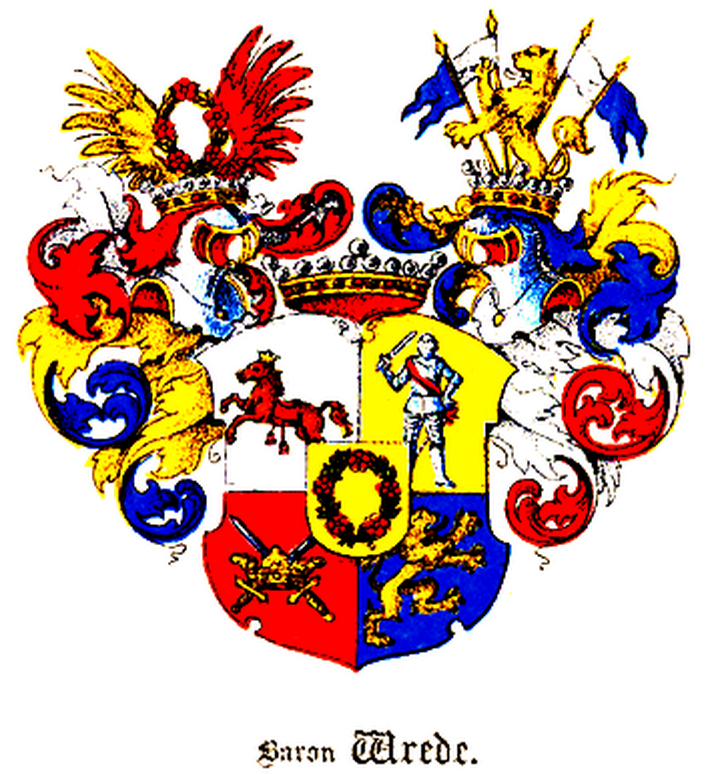
Coat of arms of the Swedish branch of the Wrede family

The House of Wrede is the name two different noble families, the German princely one, originating in Bavaria and a more ancient one, Finnish-Swede von Wrede family, also of German descent, originating in Westphalia, whose members held the title of Baron and Count.

== Surname ==
Wrede is also a German surname. Wrede are introduced nobility of the Swedish House of Nobility. The Swedish branch of the family is numbered 27 in the Comital families, and the Finnish Wrede af Elimä are numbered 44 in the Baronial families. The Wrede af Elimä are a Baronial family in the Finnish House of Nobility.

== History ==
The Finnish-Swede branch descend from Henrik Wrede, a cavalry officer who, at the Battle of Kircholm sacrificed his life to save Charles IX of Sweden's life.

== Notable people ==
- Agneta Wrede (1674–1730), Swedish noblewoman
- Axel Wrede Sparre (1708–1772), Swedish military officer, civil servant, and Freemason
- Carolus Wrede (1860–1927), Finnish industrialist
- Caspar Wrede (1929–1998), Finnish film director
- Fabian Wrede, Count of Östanå (1641–1712), Swedish Count and advisor to King Charles XI of Sweden
- Fabian Wrede (1694–1768), Swedish politician
- Fabian Casimir Wrede (1724–1795), Swedish general and military engineer
- Fabian Wrede (1760-1824), Swedish field marshal
- Gustaf Wrede (1889–1958), Finnish engineer and businessman
- Gerda Wrede (1896–1967), Finnish actor and speech therapist
- Henrik Wrede (died 1605), Swedish cavalry officer
- Jens-Peter Wrede (born 1957), German sailor
- Johan Wrede (born 1935), Finnish literary historian
- Karl Philipp von Wrede (1767–1838), Bavarian field-marshal
- Karl August Wrede (1859-1943), Finnish architect
- Klaus-Jürgen Wrede (born 1963), German game designer, creator of the board game Carcassonne
- Ludwig Wrede (1894-1965), Austrian figure skater
- Laura Swaan Wrede (born 1964), Swedish army officer
- Mathilda Wrede (1864–1928), Finnish baroness and philanthropist
- Patricia Wrede (born 1953), American fantasy writer
- Rabbe Axel Wrede (1851-1938), Finnish politician
- Theodor Freiherr von Wrede (1888–1973), German general
- Thomas Wrede (born 1963), German photographer
- William Wrede (1859–1906), German theologian

== Places ==
- Kapp Wrede, a cape on Svalbard
- Wrede Creek, a creek in Canada
- Wrede Passage, a building in Helsinki
- Wrede Range, a mountain range in Canada
- Wrede School, Gillespie County, Texas
