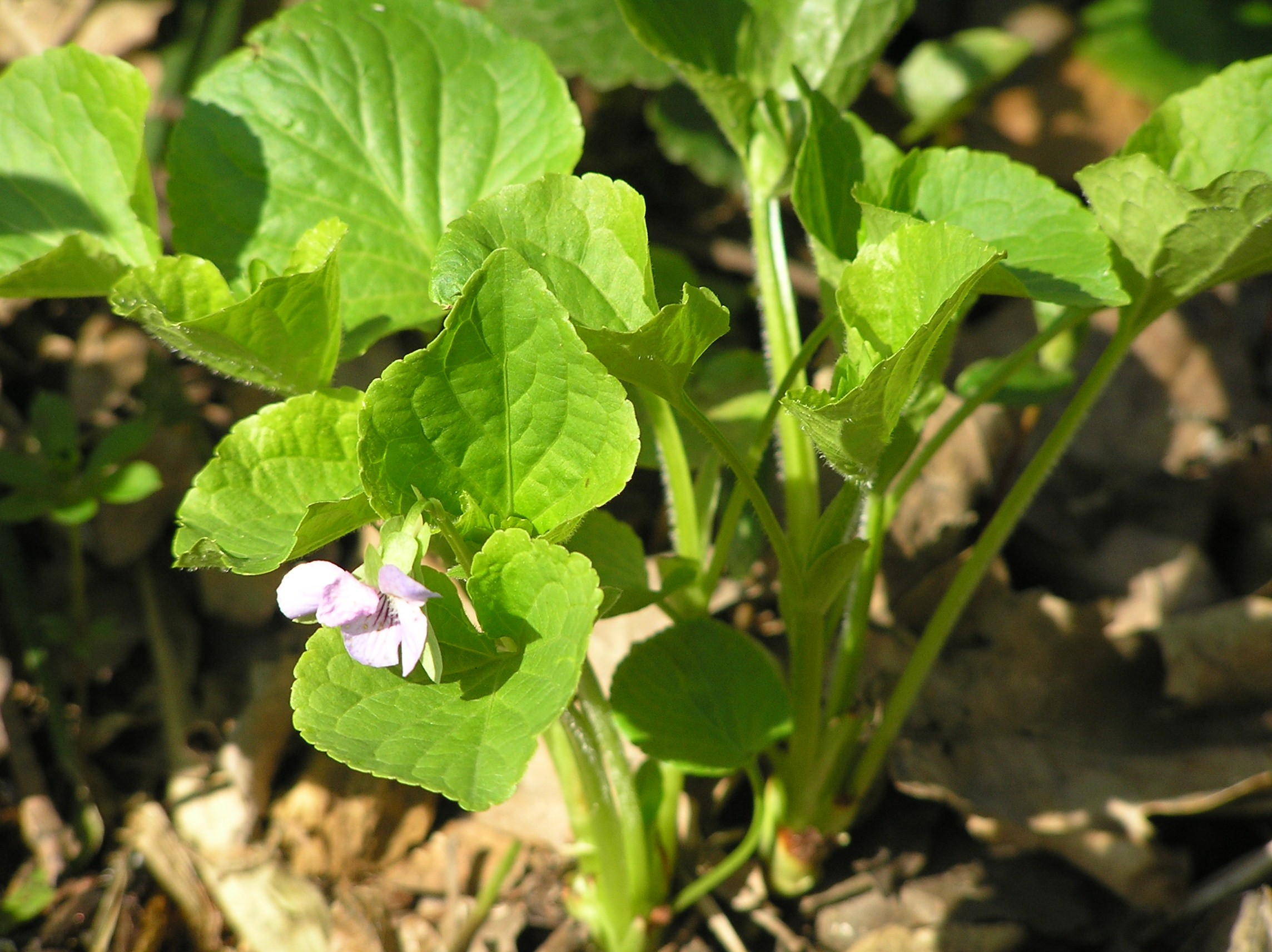

Scientific classification
- Kingdom: Plantae
- Clade: Tracheophytes
- Clade: Angiosperms
- Clade: Eudicots
- Clade: Rosids
- Order: Malpighiales
- Family: Violaceae
- Genus: Viola
- Species: V. mirabilis

Binomial name
- Viola mirabilis L.

= Viola mirabilis =

Species of flowering plant

Viola mirabilis is a species of flowering plant belonging to the family Violaceae.

It is native to temperate areas of Eurasia.
