= Procopé =

Procopé is a surname. Notable people with the surname include:

- Hjalmar Procopé (1889–1954), Finnish politician
- Ulla Procopé (1921–1968), Finnish ceramic designer
