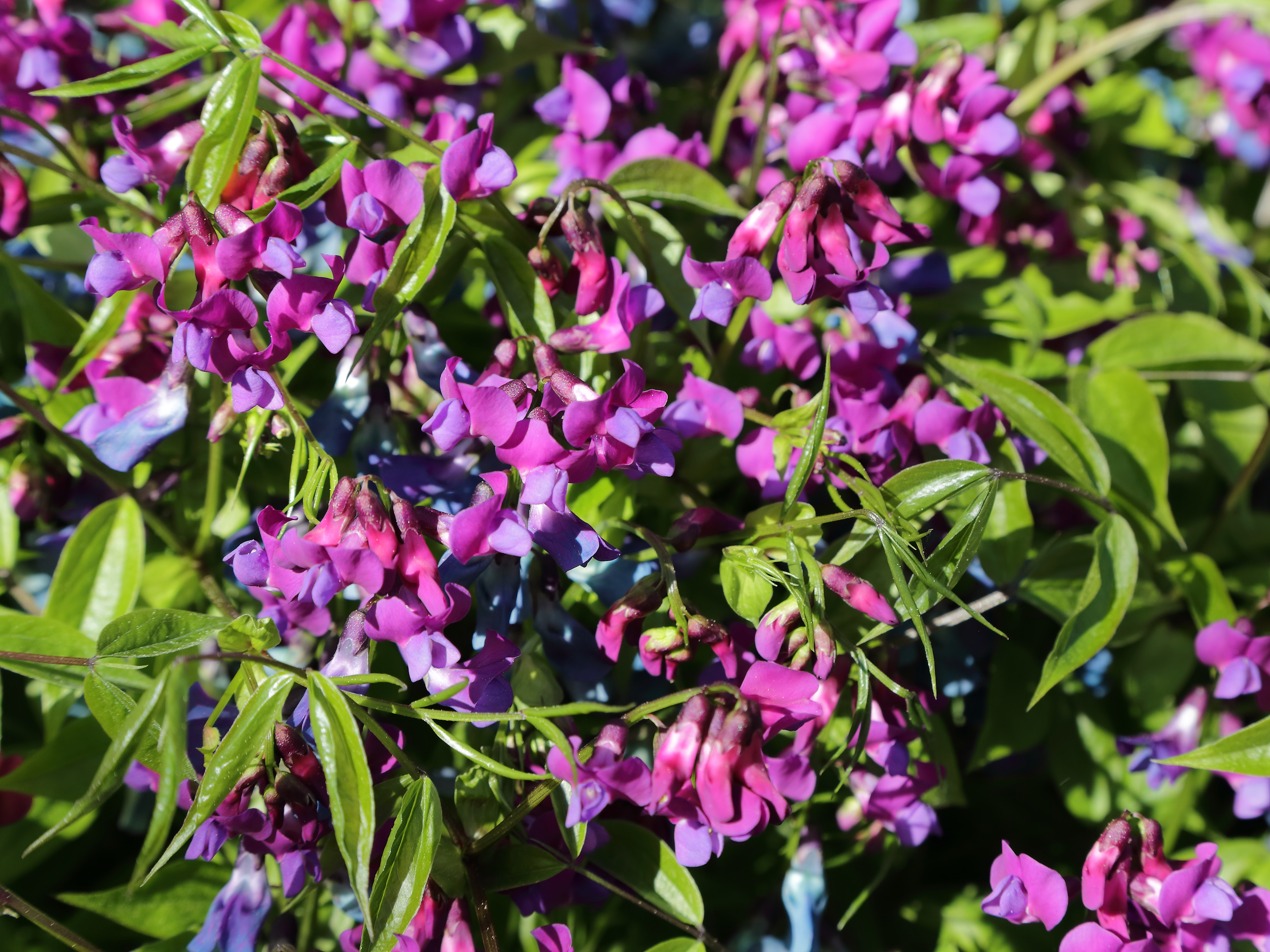

Scientific classification
- Kingdom: Plantae
- Clade: Tracheophytes
- Clade: Angiosperms
- Clade: Eudicots
- Clade: Rosids
- Order: Fabales
- Family: Fabaceae
- Subfamily: Faboideae
- Genus: Lathyrus
- Species: L. vernus

Binomial name
- Lathyrus vernus (L.) Bernh.

Synonyms
- Orobus vernus L.

= Lathyrus vernus =

Species of legume

Lathyrus vernus, the spring vetchling, spring pea, or spring vetch, is a species of flowering herbaceous perennial plant in the genus Lathyrus, native to forests of Europe and Siberia. It forms a dense clump of pointed leaves with purple flowers in spring, shading to a greenish-blue with age.

This species, and the cultivar 'Alboroseus', have gained the Royal Horticultural Society's Award of Garden Merit.

== Description ==
Lathyrus vernus is a perennial plant with an upright stem without wings. The stem grows to 20 to 40 cm (8 to 16 in) and is erect and nearly hairless. The leaves are alternate with short stalks and large, wide stipules. The leaf blades are pinnate with two to four pairs of ovate tapering leaflets with blunt tips, entire margins and no tendrils. The inflorescence has a long stem and three to ten purplish-red flowers, each 13 to 20 mm (0.5 to 0.8 in) long, turning bluer as they age. These have five sepals and five petals and are irregular. The uppermost petal is known as the "standard", the lateral two as the "wings" and the lowest two are joined to form the "keel". There are ten stamens and a single carpel. The fruit is a long brown pod up to 60 mm (2.4 in) in length containing eight to fourteen seeds which are poisonous. This plant flowers early in the year, in May and June. It can be distinguished from bitter vetch (L. linifolius) and black pea (L. niger) by the breadth of its ovate leaflets. It does not wither after flowering but continues to grow until autumn.

== Distribution and habitat ==
Lathyrus vernus is native to Europe and parts of northern Asia. Its typical habitat is broad-leaved woodland, forest margins, plantations and clearings.

== Gallery ==
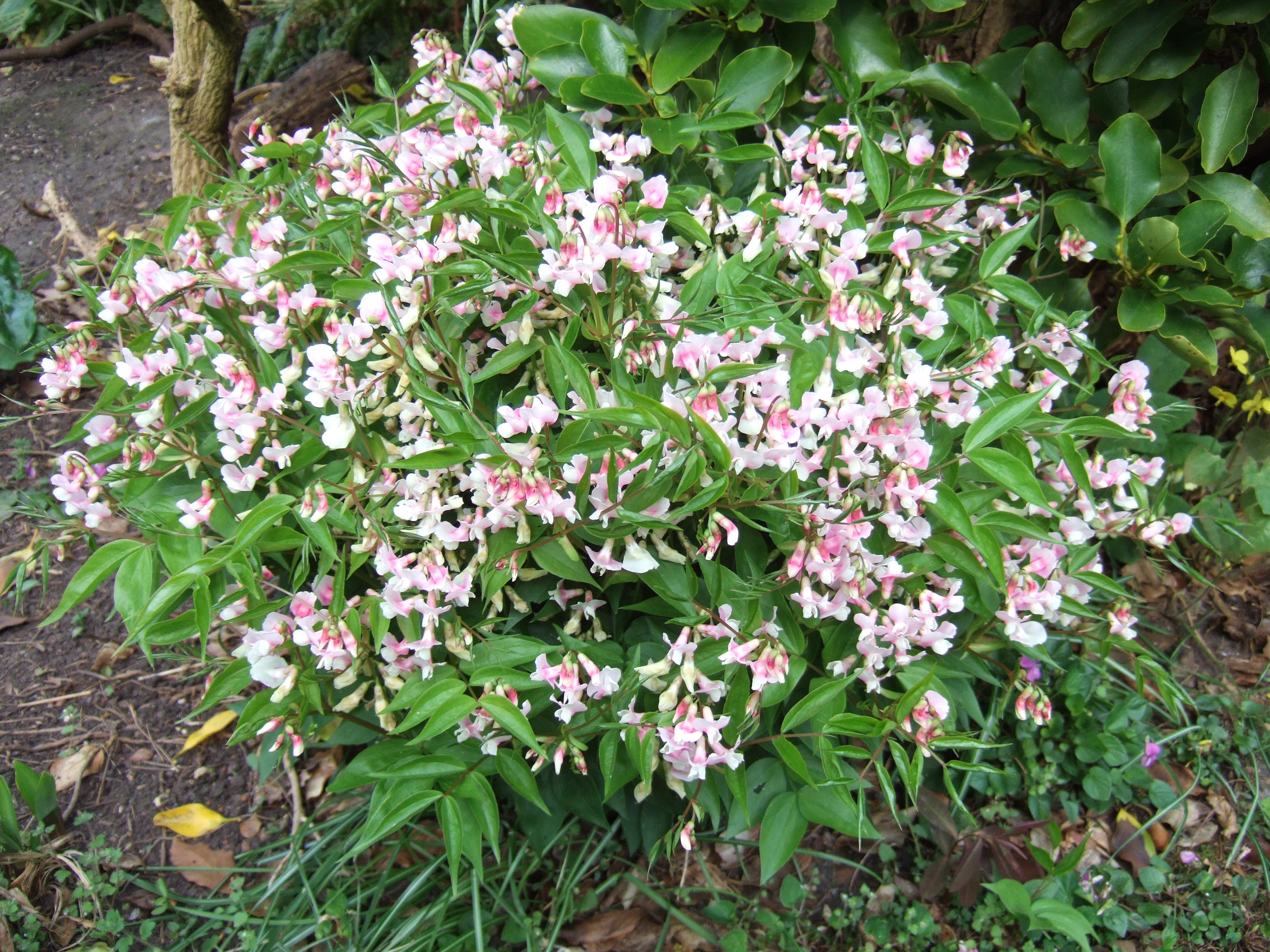
Pink-flowered cultivar, Lathyrus vernus 'Alboroseus'

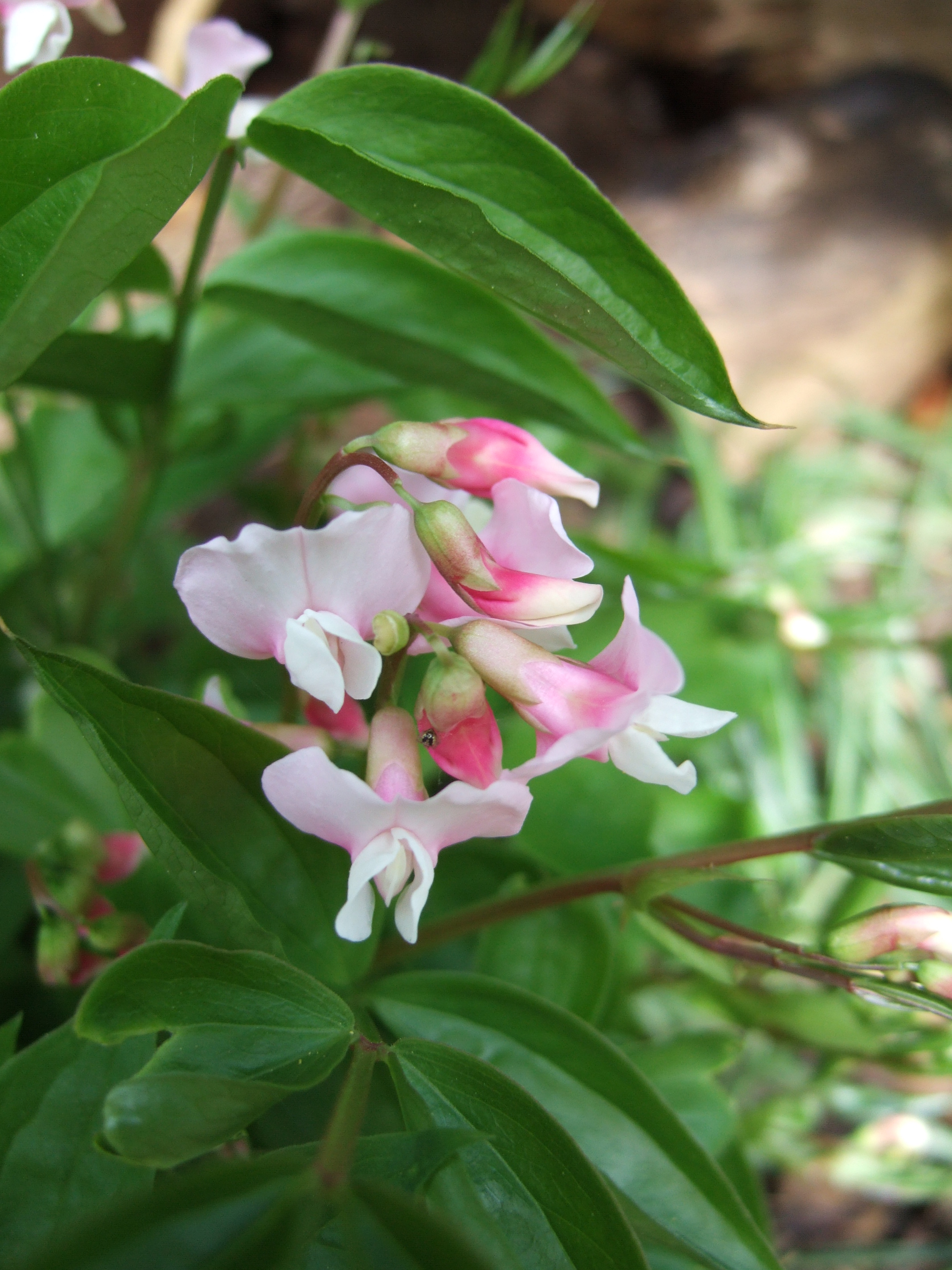
Detail of the flower of the pink-flowered cultivar, Lathyrus vernus 'Alboroseus'

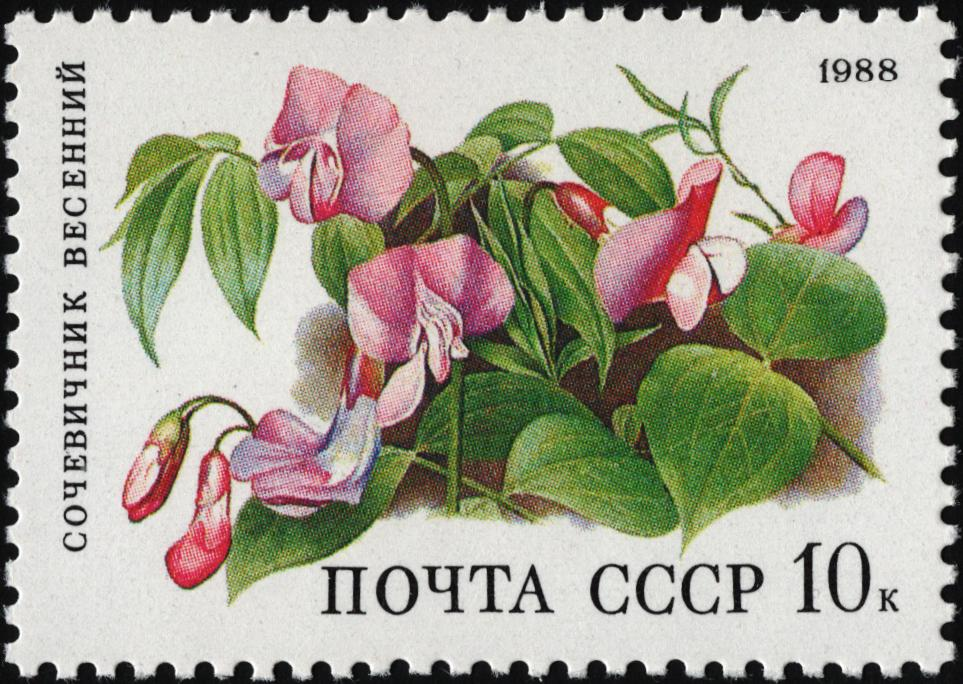
Lathyrus vernus on stamp of USSR

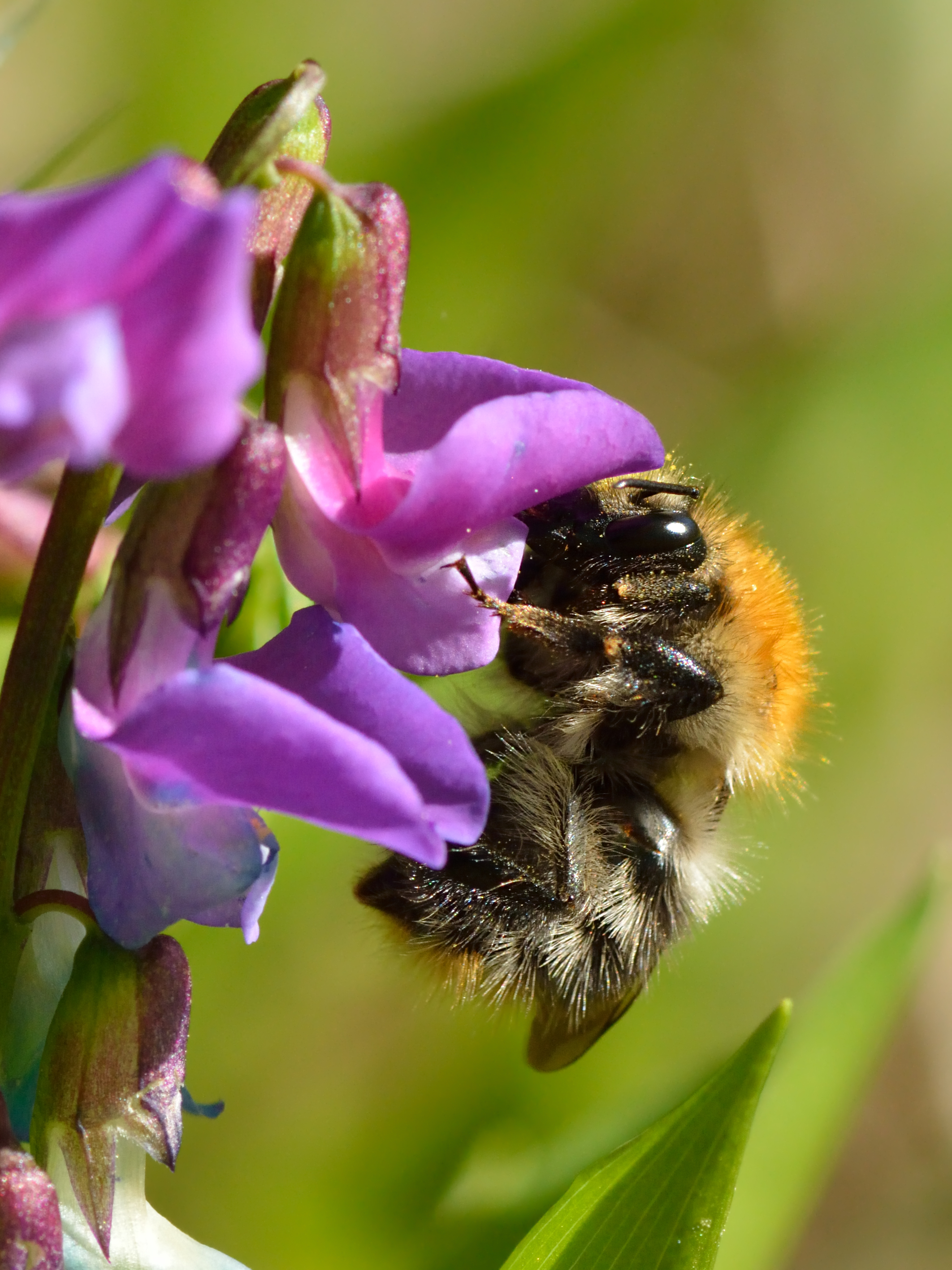
Pollination
