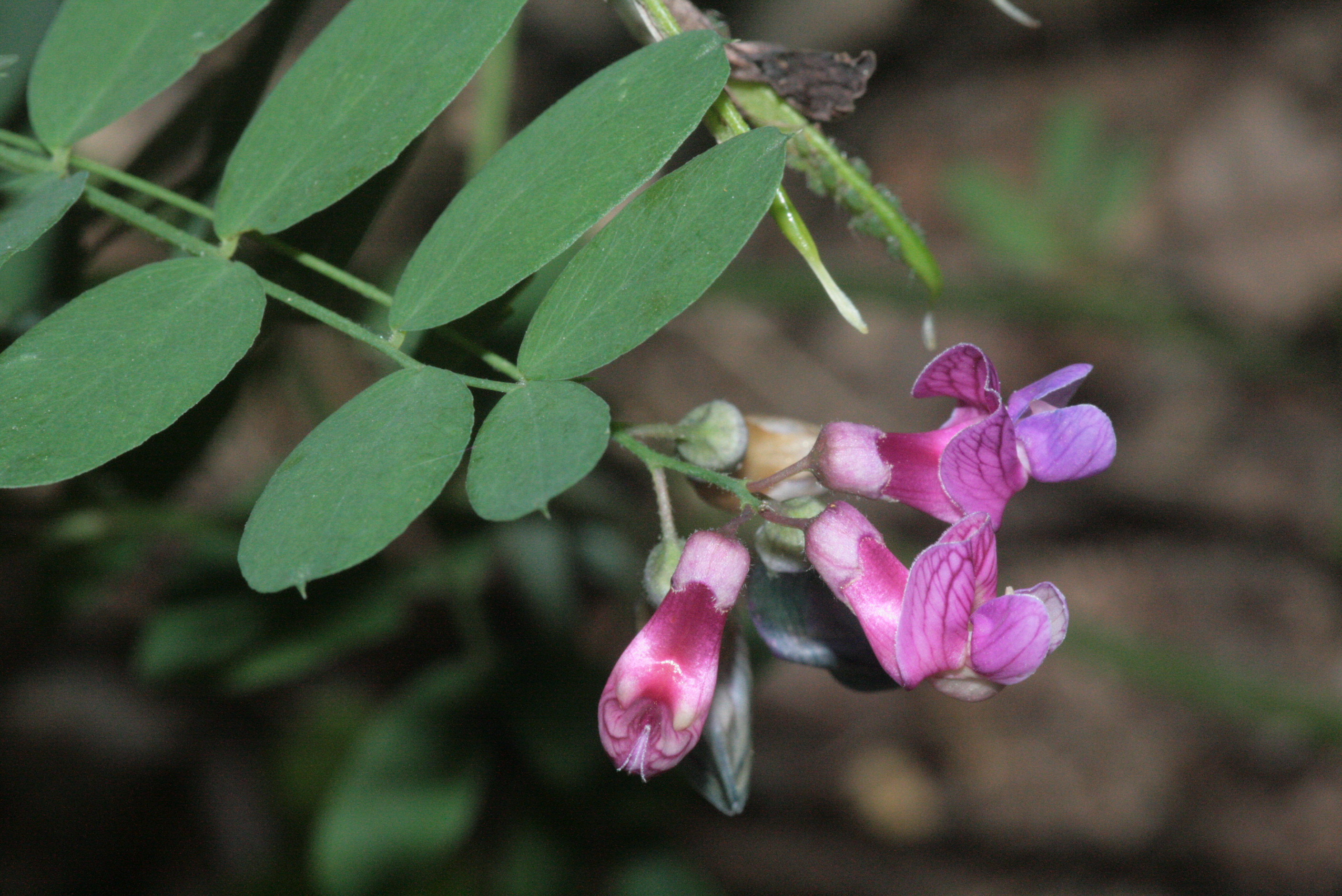

Conservation status
- Least Concern (IUCN 3.1)

Scientific classification
- Kingdom: Plantae
- Clade: Tracheophytes
- Clade: Angiosperms
- Clade: Eudicots
- Clade: Rosids
- Order: Fabales
- Family: Fabaceae
- Subfamily: Faboideae
- Genus: Lathyrus
- Species: L. niger

Binomial name
- Lathyrus niger (L.) Bernth.

= Lathyrus niger =

Black pea

Species of legume

Lathyrus niger, also known as black pea, blackening flat pea and black bitter vetch, is a perennial legume that is native to Europe. Its common name is reference to the blackening of the plant's foliage as it dies.

The seeds of the species are not to be confused with edible 'black peas', which are a form of Pisum sativum. Seeds of Lathyrus species are toxic, containing an enzyme that interferes with collagen synthesis to cause the disease Lathyrism.

== Description ==
Lathyrus niger is a perennial plant with erect, self-supporting stems that grow to 30 to 80 cm (12 to 31 in). The stems are branched and unwinged and nearly hairless. The leaves are alternate with short winged stalks and narrow stipules. The leaf blades are pinnate with four to eight pairs of narrow elliptical leaflets with sharp tips, entire margins and no tendrils. The underside of the leaflets is bluish-green. The inflorescences grow from the axils and are often one-sided. They have long stems with two to ten red flowers, each 10 to 16 mm (0.4 to 0.6 in) long, turning bluer as they age. Each flower has five sepals and five petals and are irregular. The uppermost petal is known as the "standard", the lateral two as the "wings" and the lowest two are joined to form the "keel". There are ten stamens and a single carpel. The fruit is a long black pod containing up to eight seeds. This plant flowers in June and July.

== Distribution and habitat ==
Lathyrus niger is native to Europe and parts of Asia. Its typical habitat is broad-leaved woodland, forest margins, woodland clearings and plantations.

== Ecology ==
The flowers of Lathyrus niger are pollinated by bees and smaller insects are unable to make their way to the nectar source. The young flowers are red and visited by bees but when they have been pollinated they turn blue and stop producing nectar so the bees go elsewhere. The plant becomes black as the foliage withers at the end of the growing season.
