= Agneta Horn =

Swedish writer (1629–1672)

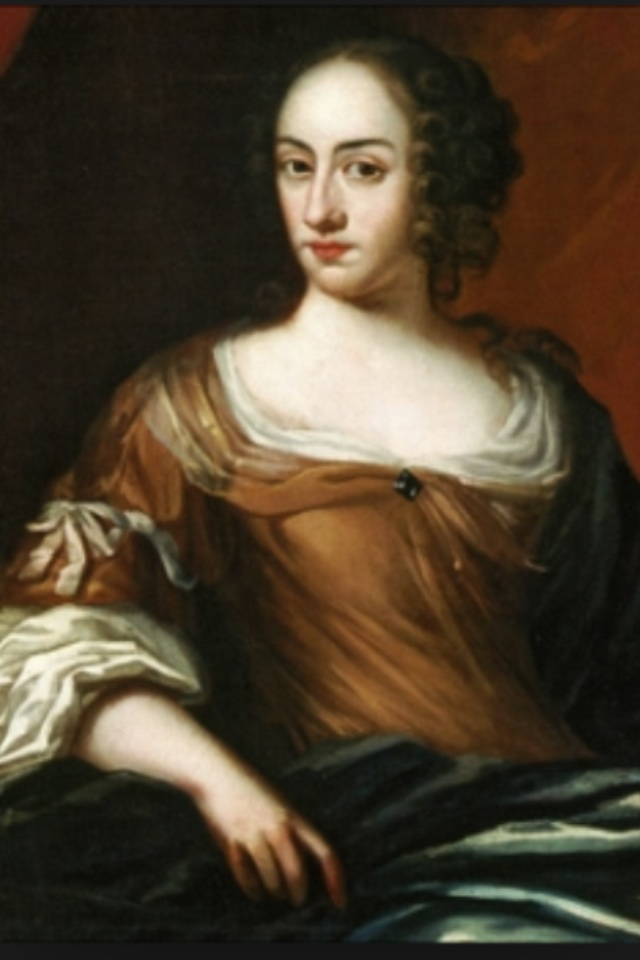
- Portrait by David Klöcker Ehrenstrahl
- Born: 18 August 1629; Riga, Swedish Livonia
- Died: 18 March 1672 (aged 42)
- Occupations: Writer; autobiographer; estate manager; military wife; mother
- Writing career
- Period: 1600s
- Genre: Autobiography
- Subjects: Swedish military life, religion
- Notable work: Agneta Horns leverne

Agneta Horn (18 August 1629 – 18 March 1672) was a Swedish writer born to noble parents and a military father. She traveled a great deal throughout Europe in her lifetime as a result of living in a military family and later marrying another soldier. She is most known for writing her autobiography, Agneta Horns leverne (also spelled "lefverne").

== Life ==
Agneta Horn was the daughter of Gustav Horn, Count of Björneborg and Kristina Oxenstierna, and the granddaughter of Axel Oxenstierna. She was born on 18 August 1629, in Riga in what is now Latvia, because her father was a Swedish military officer stationed outside of the country at the time of her birth. At six weeks of age, despite the unusual nature of a whole family living together in a Swedish military camp, Agneta and her mother joined Gustav at a camp in Kurland, in western Lithuania. The family lived there together through the fall and winter. In the spring when Gustav traveled to Germany with the military, Agneta and her mother returned to their Swedish home. Soon after, Agneta's younger brother Axel was born. The family was reunited with Gustav again in Neumark after Axel's birth. Horn writes: "Because she took us both with her and sailed to Germany and landed at Wolgast, where my father met her. Then, he took her and us with him to the army, which at the time was in Neumark" (Agneta Horn’s Leverne, 1910). Therefore, from a young age, Agneta was exposed to Swedish military campaigns, particularly the war between Sweden and Denmark. In her autobiography she recalls this experience: "But then came the King of Denmark and camped across from our army. And they began to shoot at each other's camps with guns. Because they were shooting so close together the bullets fell into our tent" (Agneta Horn’s Leverne, 1910). In 1634 Gustav Horn was captured by Imperialist military forces and held as a prisoner of war for eight years. Kristina died when Agneta was a child. Her father remarried, and Agneta was raised for much of her childhood by Ebba Leijonhufvud, a "cold and heartless" aunt.

Agneta continued to witness Swedish military life as an adult. She had no interest in civilian men and wanted only to marry a soldier; allegedly, she rejected one non-military man by burning his own gloves and dousing him in hot wax. Horn eventually married the "brav soldat" ("strong/brave soldier") Lars Kruus in 1648. As a married couple, they lived together in Poland and Germany. She regarded this time together as a period of "hardships and tribulations". Agneta experienced unpleasant and difficult travel and multiple bouts of illness. In her autobiography, she wrote: "And I was so sick and so tired. Both from the trip by sea and the journey in a peasant wagon that shook me. I was so stiff, I could not manage to move when I arrived" (Agneta Horn’s Leverne, 1910).

Lars died in a campaign in Poland when Agneta was 26; together, they had four children. She returned to Sweden and never remarried.

As a widow, Horn maintained an active life. Horn was an involved and prominent member of "religious life of her community" and was active in running her estates. She undertook a project to completely raze and rebuild a church in Björklinge. However, religious leaders in the region (Uppsala) convinced her to be content with a large-scale renovation and remodeling. Her influence and work can still be seen in the church today. There is a plaque commemorating Horn and her husband, as well as a portrait of a mother with two children, believed to be a representation of Horn. She died at the age of 42.

== Writing ==
Horn's only known work is her autobiography, Agneta Horn’s Leverne, written around 1660, five years after her husband's death and her return to Sweden. These memoirs were first discovered in 1885, and while largely dealing with personal issues such as family deaths and conflicts, they are written in the context of Sweden's culture of the time, including such conflicts as the Thirty Years' War. Her manuscript was handwritten and hand-bound by Horn, and some now believe that the sections of her autobiography are in an order different from her original plan. The book is believed to have been written for personal, private readership, addressing both her stepmother Sigrid Bielke and her four children. This theory may be verified by the fact that Horn often glosses over details or background information when writing about a situation. She assumes that her readers are already familiar with the events she describes. Her diary has been considered by some to be the first Swedish novel.

Agneta Horn’s Leverne is broken into several different sections. The last six leaves of the original manuscript are quotes from the Biblical Psalms or Book of Job. Job is a righteous man who endures many trials and sufferings at the hand of God, but he never questions or challenges God's nature. He simply accepts the trials as they come. The primary message from the Book of Job is the question of why the righteous suffer. Given the difficult life Agneta Horn experienced, in her childhood in military camps and with her aunt, and then later as an adult, again living in military camps and experiencing the death of her husband, these introductory quotes are particularly significant. In thirteen instances, Horn changed the quotes to use first person or feminine pronouns, presumably so make the quotes "refer specifically to her . . . [and] to her situation." One can gather that Horn identified strongly with the Biblical Job, and related her own life's struggles to the constant hardships he experienced. Yet quoting Job also demonstrates that she felt the proper response to challenges in her life was to endure and carry on despite suffering. However, as Job experiences physical pain, Horn's strife is mostly related to her emotional pain. She recounts few joyous or happy experiences in her autobiography. Notably missing is an account of her wedding to Kruus.

Horn's work is also regarded as significant because of her unique use of language. For one, she "has no detachment from the characters in her autobiography". She writes about the people in her life "with passion," in a style that is emotional and engaging rather than removed and objective. She "does not seek to explain facts, but to replay and analyze emotions". Her writing is also regarded by as being especially informal and of a "brisk everyday style." This briskness is interspersed with "an almost Biblical style" in the section of her work where she quotes from Job and Psalms. Horn's writing has also been noted for her unique linguistic choices. For instance, in some cases she combined the endings of traditional written and oral Swedish to form new versions of the words.

Leverne is one of the first known written works by a Swedish woman, as well as one of the only published works to date that features a female perspective of the Swedish imperial military. It is the single most comprehensive work about and insight into the life of an individual Swede before the 1700s.

== Critical response ==
Though Horn's autobiography is generally well received, some critics have accused her work of being hysterical, base, or gaudy. These critics have ignored Horn's well-deserved place in the history of Swedish prose and autobiographical writing. Other scholars have deemed their criticism misguided, for it inappropriately conflates the writer and the individual. Stephen A. Mitchell writes, "What is so very mistaken about such comments, of course, is that they tend to interpret [Horn’s] actions as the protagonist of the autobiography, rather than examining the delicate balance between the writer and her heroine".
