= Christian von Ilow =

Neumark nobleman

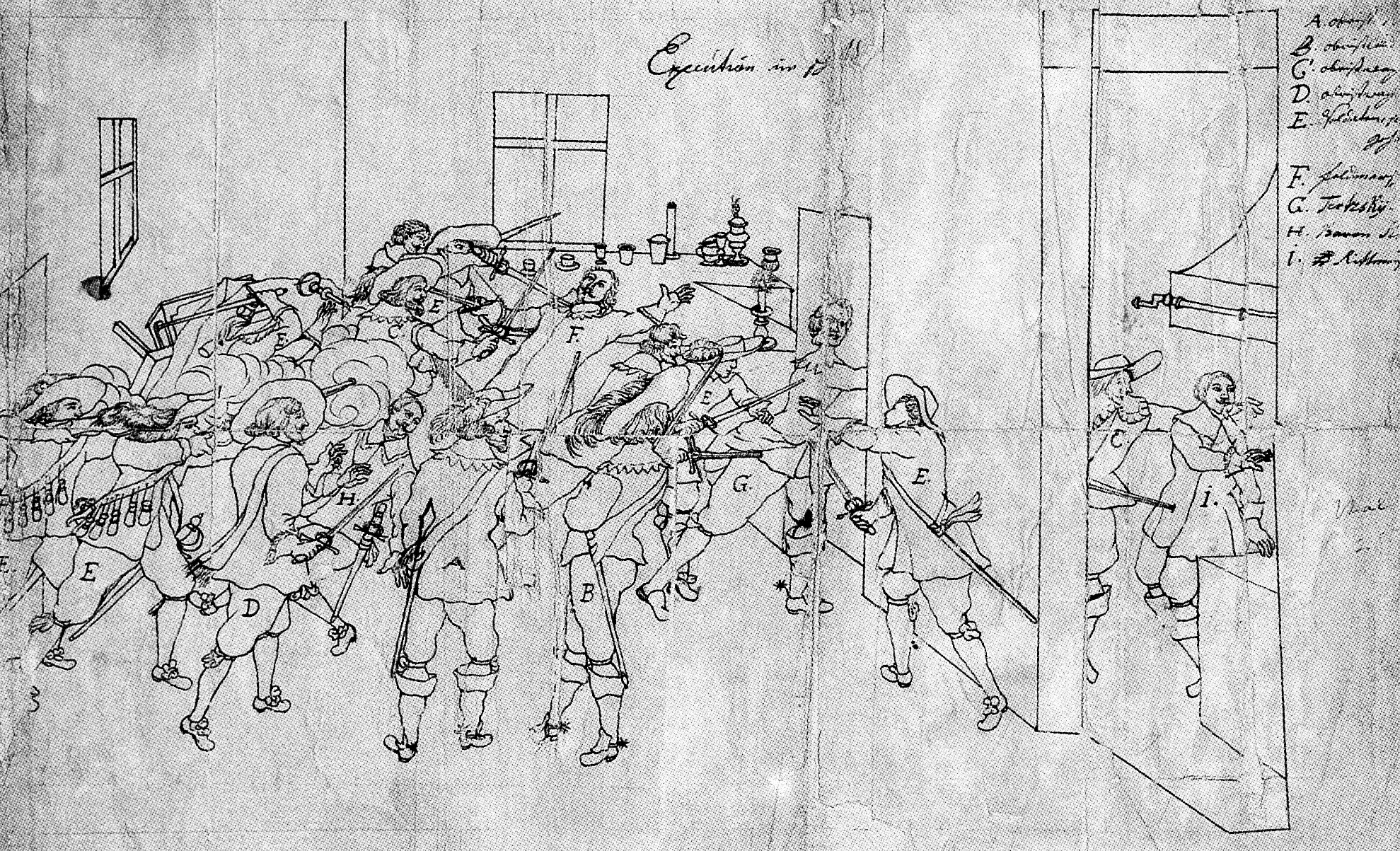
- Drawing of Ilow's murder
- Born: 1585; Neumark, Holy Roman Empire
- Died: 25 February 1634 (aged 48–49) Eger, Holy Roman Empire
- Allegiance: Holy Roman Empire
- Service years: 1618 – 1634
- Rank: Generalfeldmarschall
- Conflicts: Thirty Years' War: Bohemian Revolt; Battle of Stadtlohn; Battle of Breitenfeld (1631)

Christian von Ilow (1585 – 25 February 1634) was a Neumark nobleman and Generalfeldmarschall who fought during the course of the Thirty Years' War. At the outbreak of the war, Ilow enlisted into the Imperial army, rapidly advancing through the lower ranks. Through his close association with Imperial Generalissimo Albrecht von Wallenstein, he attained the rank of Generalfeldmarschall. He was killed in Eger on 25 February 1634 along with the general and his loyal officers the assassination being the culmination of an internal purge of Wallenstein's supporters.

== Military career ==
Ilow was born in 1585, to Neumark family of minor nobility. Ilow claimed that his lineage extended to Greece, his ancestors supposedly migrated to Germany during the reign of Henry the Fowler. After participating in his campaigns against the Hungarians, Wends, Moravians and Bohemians, Henry bestowed nobility upon him. Ilow entered Imperial service at the outbreak of the Bohemian Revolt, rapidly advancing through the lower ranks. On 11 December 1621, emperor Ferdinand II transferred the command of a regiment consisting of 1,000 cuirassiers to duke Adolf of Holstein-Gottorp. Ilow now at the rank of a colonel, assumed direct command of the regiment as the duke was too young of age to do so. The Holsteiners distinguished themselves at the Battle of Stadtlohn, where one of Ilow's officers captured William, Duke of Saxe-Weimar. Ilow paid the officer handsomely, securing the right to escort and personally present his prisoner at the Imperial court in Vienna. Ilow had acquired great riches through plundering enemy territories during the course of the campaign, lending the emperor 70,000 Goldgulden. He then bought a house in Prague as well as the Bohemian estates of Popovitz, Bukov, and Ladowetz. His marriage to widow Anna Albertine of Rziczan countess of Furstenberg, strengthened his ties with the Bohemian political elite represented by the Trczka and Kinsky families, while the estates of Olbramowitz and Drazkow were added to his possessions. In the spring of 1625, Ilow was recalled into active service campaigning in Hessen and Nassau, where his riders gained infamy for their plundering and violent demeanor. Following the Imperial victory at the Battle of Dessau Bridge, Imperial supreme commander Albrecht von Wallenstein departed for Silesia and later Hungary in order to pursue Gabriel Bethlen, leaving Ilow at Schmalkalden. In a letter towards Karl von Harrach, Wallestein states that the reason behind this decision was his resentment for Ilow whom he characterized as vain and gossipy.

On 3 November 1627, Ilow was elevated to the status of Reichsfreiherr. On 27 November 1627, Ilow was present at Ferdinand III's crowning as king of Bohemia, he used the occasion in order to showcase his new coat of arms which bore an imperial laurel wreath. In May 1628, he received the command of a 600-man cavalry regiment from Philipp Cratz von Scharfenstein. He spent the following years, recruiting troops for other generals. In September 1631, he fought at the Battle of Breitenfeld (1631). In the early days of October 1631, he briefly occupied Zittau in Saxony before retreating to Bohemia which at the time faced a Saxon invasion. Despite the fact that Wallenstein was removed from command, Ilow continued to solicit his advice, significantly improving their relations. On 8 April 1632, Ilow was promoted into Feldmarschall-Lieutenant. On 13 April, the emperor formalized Wallenstein's return to the position of supreme commander. In April 1632, Ilow fought in Upper Lusatia, by October he had secured Zittau, Löbau, and Görlitz. On 11 November, he helped relieve Broumov from a Saxon siege, spending the winter at Bohemia's northern frontier. In February 1633, he successfully stormed Reichenbach. On 4 June, he captured Nimptsch, which was completely destroyed by fire. Wallenstein employed Ilow as his personal envoy, delivering important messages to the emperor and his generals. On 19 October 1633, he was promoted to the rank of Generalfeldmarschall on Wallenstein's request, much to the dismay of more experienced commanders. He accompanied the Generalissimo in his pursuit of Hans Georg von Arnim-Boitzenburg in the vicinity of Forst, he was then sent back to Lusatia, recapturing Görlitz on 30 October, following a costly engagement. Bautzen fell soon afterwards, Ilow extorted its citizens compelling them to pay a large sum of money. In December, Ilow returned to Bohemia.

=== Ilow and the fall of Wallenstein ===
Wallenstein was increasingly criticized for his passivity in face of a Swedish incursion into Bavaria and the collapse of Lorraine under French pressure. His dislike of courtly life and the influence exerted by the church upon the emperor created an axis of undercover opposition that launched a smear campaign against him. On 11 January 1634, Gundakar, Prince of Liechtenstein sent Ferdinand II an official request, recommending Wallenstein's liquidation. A day later, Wallenstein summoned his colonels to sign the First Pilsner Reverse, a declaration of personal loyalty, 49 of them signed immediately while Hans Ulrich von Schaffgotsch and Scherffenberg gathered signatures in Silesia and Upper Austria respectively. Numerous commanders signed the Reverse so as not to arouse suspicion, while at the same time a party centered around Ottavio Piccolomini began circulating an anonymous tract that summarized the army's grudges against Wallenstein. On 17 February, Scherffenberg was arrested in Vienna. On 18 February, a second patent was released accusing Wallenstein of conspiracy and condemning him to death, its publication was delayed so as not to split the army in two. Wallenstein's letters refuting the accusations against him remained unanswered, after realizing that the emperor was positioning troops in such a manner as to surround him he decided to flee to the Swedes. Wallenstein, Ilow and other loyal officers departed from their headquarters on 22 February along with 1,300 men. Irish colonel Walter Butler, the leader of a group of Irish and Scottish officers hired by Piccolomini to assassinate Wallenstein, was ordered by the unsuspecting general to follow them with his 900 dragoons. On 24 February, Wallenstein reached Eger, most of the trusted troops camped outside of the town as it was already garrisoned Butler's dragoons and other anti-Wallenstein elements. The following day Ilow held a series of meetings with the would be assassins trying to persuade them to remain loyal to their commander. They made the decision to go on with Piccolomini's plan, fearing that they would be branded as rebels should they fail to do so. At 6.00 p.m., Wallenstein's inner circle consisting of Ilow, Adam Erdmann Trčka von Lípa, Vilém Kinský and Captain Niemann were invited by the conspirators to the city's castle for a formal dinner. During the course of the dinner a servant nodded indicating that the conspirators were ready. Six dragoons burst into the dining hall shouting "Who is a good Imperialist?", Butler, John Gordon and Walter Leslie rose from the table yelling "Long live Ferdinand!". Kinský was killed immediately, although he made a desperate attempt to fight back. Ilow grabbed his sword and charged at Gordon; before being able to strike he was knocked to the ground by the dragoons and killed, others met a similar fate. Wallenstein was killed in his residence at 10.00 p.m. An imperial decree equated the participants of the perpetrators of the so-called Eger Bloodbath with official executioners. The purge continued with the execution of Schaffgotsch; a number of generals were imprisoned and lost their commands, while the possessions of the accused were confiscated and redistributed. Ilow's daughter, who was born a few days before her father's death, secured the family a small portion of its former estates.

== Notes ==
Citations
