= Assassination of Wallenstein =

1634 murder in Eger, Holy Roman Empire

The Assassination of Albrecht von Wallenstein was the culmination of an internal purge in the army of the Holy Roman Empire. On 25 February 1634, a group of Irish and Scottish officers acting under the approval of Ferdinand II, Holy Roman Emperor, assassinated generalissimo Albrecht von Wallenstein and a group of his companions in the town of Eger (today's Cheb, Czech Republic). The assassins were equated to executioners by a royal decree and rewarded with property confiscated from the families of their victims. The purge continued through the persecution of other high-ranking military personnel who were seen as Wallenstein's supporters.

== Background ==
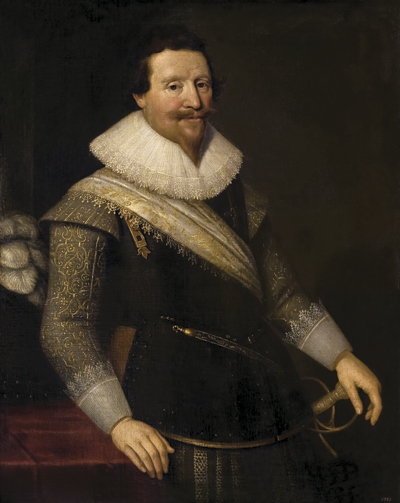
Portrait of Wallenstein by Michiel Jansz. van Mierevelt.

Albrecht von Wallenstein was born on 24 September 1584, into the noble Bohemian Waldstein family. On 28 August 1599, he enrolled into the University of Altdorf but was soon expelled due to his involvement in brawls. He spent the next couple of years traveling around Europe. In 1604, he enlisted as an ensign into the military of the Holy Roman Empire. He fought during the closing stage of the Long Turkish War, rising to the rank of colonel by the outbreak of Bocskai uprising during which he commanded a unit of Bohemian Estates militia. In 1607, he became the chamberlain of Ferdinand of Styria, future Ferdinand II, Holy Roman Emperor. In May 1609, he married Lucretia Vičkov, a widow of considerable means who died in 1614 granting Wallenstein her property. Wallenstein had previously secured his fortune by converting from the Protestant Unity of the Brethren denomination to Catholicism during the ongoing Recatholicazation campaign in Bohemia.

At the outbreak of the 1618 Bohemian Revolt, he demonstrated his loyalty to the crown by fighting his former coreligionists represented by the Bohemian Estates. A unit of cuirassiers whom he had recruited at his own expense fought at the decisive Battle of White Mountain which ended the revolt in the crown's favor. In 1623, Wallenstein married Elizabeth von Harrach, the daughter of Karl von Harrach, an influential member of Emperor Ferdinand's Geheimrat (Privy Council). Harrach's two other daughters married Adam Erdmann Trčka von Lípa and Wallenstein's cousin Max von Waldstein. Wallenstein's newly acquired connections and riches enabled him to purchase vast estates formerly belonging to rebel barons, loan the emperor vast sums of money, and raise thousands of troops. He campaigned extensively during the Thirty Years' War, repelling incursions by the pretender to the Hungarian throne, Gabriel Bethlen, and defeating the Mansfeldian army in the Palatinate campaign of 1623. Those successes were followed by victories against the Danes between 1626 and 1628, which ended their intervention into the war. In February 1628, Wallenstein wrote off 4,750,000 florins of debt to the imperial treasury in exchange for being elevated to imperial prince and receiving the Duchy of Mecklenburg. His army was now triple the size of that of the Catholic League, the empire's biggest ally. His meteoric rise to power was unprecedented in its scale, becoming increasingly controversial among the members of the League who feared that their own possessions might be confiscated should they disobey the emperor's command.

In July 1630, the Catholic League used the opportunity of the Regensburg Electoral Congress to demand Wallenstein's dismissal. Wallenstein's reluctance to participate in the life of the court allowed his opponents to spread malicious rumors about him, such as his supposed ambitions to take the imperial throne for himself. Notably the Habsburg Spanish faction of the court was enraged at his failure to intervene in the Eighty Years' War. Bowing to the pressure, Ferdinand dismissed the general on 13 August. The Swedish intervention in the Thirty Years' War that took place on the same year swung the balance of power against the empire. Many still saw the former generalissimo as the only military commander capable of maintaining a balance among the opposing forces, and his reinstatement was formalized on 13 April 1632. Wallenstein spent most of the following year campaigning separately from his senior officers, who operated autonomously, many of whom avoided him for fear of his outbursts of rage. His opponents within the army began corresponding in encoded messages, criticizing his passive approach and the lack of opportunities for promotion stemming from it. Ferdinand found his responses to criticism inadequate, and the two disagreed on the number of issues, such as the unsanctioned release of the captured Protestant general Jindřich Matyáš Thurn and Wallenstein's refusal to conduct offensives during the winter months.

== Massacre ==
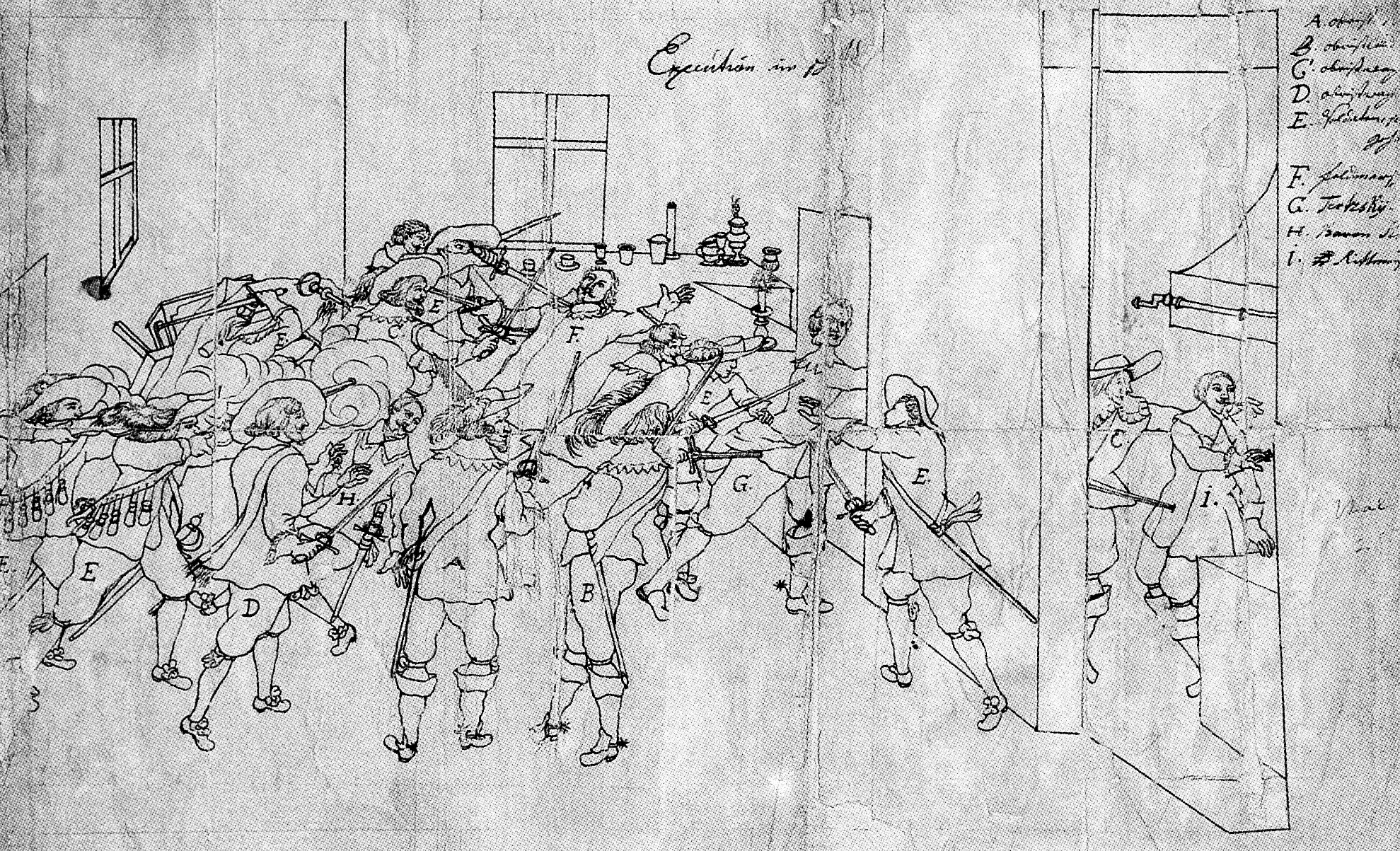
Assassination of Wallenstein's inner circle.

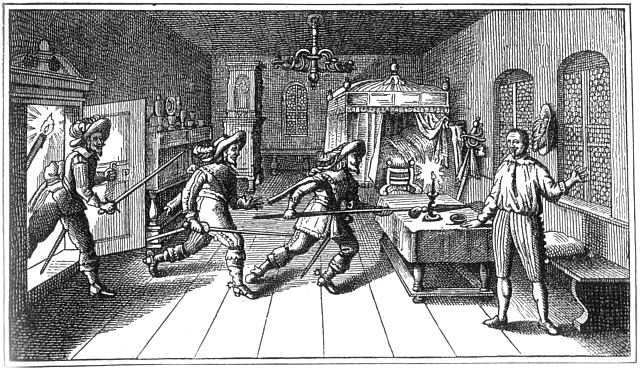
Wallenstein's assassination.

Wallenstein was increasingly criticized for his passivity in face of a Swedish incursion into Bavaria and the collapse of Lorraine under French pressure. His dislike of courtly life and the influence exerted by the Church upon the emperor created an axis of undercover opposition that launched a smear campaign against him. On 11 January 1634, Gundakar, Prince of Liechtenstein, sent Ferdinand II an official request, recommending Wallenstein's liquidation. A day later, Wallenstein summoned his colonels to sign the First Pilsner Reverse, a declaration of personal loyalty; 49 of them signed immediately while Hans Ulrich von Schaffgotsch and Johann Ernst Freiherr von Scherffenberg gathered signatures in Silesia and Upper Austria, respectively. Numerous commanders signed the Reverse so as not to arouse suspicion, while at the same time a party centered around Ottavio Piccolomini began circulating an anonymous tract that summarized the army's grudges against Wallenstein. On 17 February, Scherffenberg was arrested in Vienna. On 18 February, a second patent was released accusing Wallenstein of conspiracy and condemning him to death, its publication was delayed so as not to split the army in two. Wallenstein's letters refuting the accusations against him remained unanswered. After realizing that the emperor was positioning troops in such a manner as to surround him, he decided to flee to the Swedes.

Wallenstein, Christian von Ilow and other loyal officers departed from their headquarters on 22 February along with 1,300 men. Irish colonel Walter Butler, the leader of a group of Irish and Scottish officers hired by Piccolomini to assassinate Wallenstein, was ordered by the unsuspecting general to follow them with his 900 dragoons. On 24 February, Wallenstein reached Eger. Most of the trusted troops camped outside of the town as it was already garrisoned by Butler's dragoons and other anti-Wallenstein elements. The following day Ilow held a series of meetings with the would-be assassins and tried to persuade them to remain loyal to their commander. They made the decision to go on with Piccolomini's plan, fearing that they would be branded as rebels should they fail to do so. At 6.00 p.m., Wallenstein's inner circle, consisting of Ilow, Trčka von Lípa, Vilém Kinský and Captain Niemann, were invited by the conspirators to the city's castle for a formal dinner. During the course of the dinner, a servant nodded, indicating that the conspirators were ready. Six dragoons burst into the dining hall shouting, "Who is a good Imperialist?" Butler, John Gordon and Walter Leslie rose from the table, yelling "Long live Ferdinand!" Kinský was killed after attempting to fight back. Ilow grabbed his sword and charged at Gordon; before being able to strike, he was knocked to the ground by the dragoons and killed. Others met a similar fate. Wallenstein was killed in his residence at 10.00 p.m. An imperial decree equated the perpetrators of the assassination with official executioners.

On 1 March, the commander of the Troppau garrison, an officer under Schaffgotsch's command, declared his allegiance to Wallenstein, unaware of what had previously happened. An investigation into the incident proved that Schaffgotsch was not implicated in the uprising. In the second half of April, he was sent to Vienna upon his request, where he continued to be interrogated. On 31 March 1635, Schaffgotsch was convicted of conspiracy to overthrow the emperor and sentenced to death. He pleaded not guilty, citing the fact that Wallenstein had not been officially relieved of his command and as such he was obliged to follow his orders. On 4 July, presiding judge Heinrich von Schlick ordered the use of torture, which failed to produce a confession of guilt. A day later, the emperor confirmed the death sentence, which was implemented on the morning of 24 July 1635. Schaffgotsch's execution was part of larger purge that included the execution of the Troppau garrison commander and the demotion and the temporary imprisonment of seven generals, including Francis Albert of Saxe-Lauenburg; all of the convicted were signatories of the Pilsner Reverse.

== Notes ==
Citations
