= Albrecht von Wallenstein =

Bohemian military leader and statesman (1583–1634)

Albrecht von Wallenstein Duke of Friedland
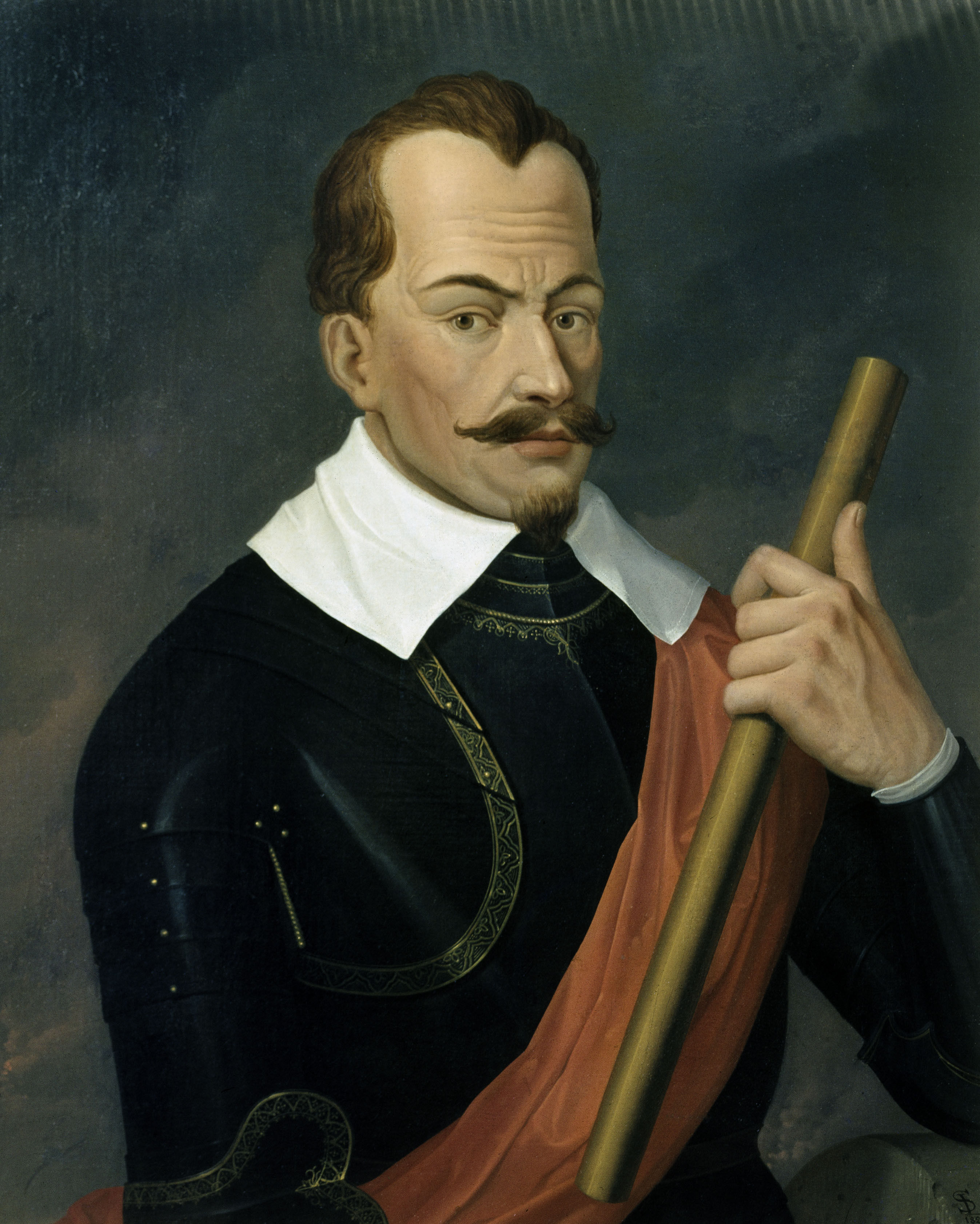
- Portrait by Julius Schnorr von Carolsfeld, after a 1629 original by Anthony van Dyck
- Born: Albrecht Wenzel Eusebius von Wallenstein; 24 September 1583 (Old style: 14 September); Heřmanice, Bohemia
- Died: 25 February 1634 (aged 50); Cheb, Bohemia
- Burial place: Mnichovo Hradiště, Bohemia
- Military career
- Allegiance: Holy Roman Empire; Kingdom of Bohemia; Catholic League
- Branch: Imperial Army of the Holy Roman Emperor
- Service years: 1604–1634
- Rank: Generalissimo
- Conflicts: Long Turkish War; Uskok War; Thirty Years' War; Battle of White Mountain (1620); Battle of Dessau Bridge (1626); Siege of Stralsund (1628); Battle of Wolgast (1628); Siege of Nuremberg (1632); Battle of the Alte Veste (Battle of Fürth); Battle of Lützen (1632); Second Battle of Steinau (1633)
- Awards: Order of the Golden Fleece

Albrecht Wenzel Eusebius von Wallenstein, Duke of Friedland (24 September 1583 – 25 February 1634), also von Waldstein (Czech: Albrecht Václav Eusebius z Valdštejna), was a Bohemian (Note: "In Wallenstein were embodied the fateful forces of his time. He belonged to the men of the Renaissance and the world of the Baroque, but also he stood above these categories as an exceptional individual. He went beyond Czech or German nationality, beyond Catholic or Protestant denominations. [...] He was a Bohemian and a prince of the German Empire.") military leader, statesman and a major figure of the Thirty Years' War, fighting on the Catholic side as supreme commander of the armies of Holy Roman Emperor Ferdinand II. His successful martial career made him one of the richest and most influential men in the Holy Roman Empire by the time of his death. He is considered one of the most important military leaders produced by the early modern period.

Wallenstein was born in the Kingdom of Bohemia into a poor Czech Protestant noble family, affiliated with the Utraquist Hussites. He acquired a multilingual university education across Europe and converted to Catholicism in 1606. A marriage in 1609 to the wealthy widow of a Bohemian landowner gave him access to considerable estates and wealth after her death at an early age in 1614. Three years later, Wallenstein embarked on a career as a mercenary by raising forces for the Holy Roman Emperor in the Uskok War against the Republic of Venice.

Wallenstein fought for the Catholics in the Protestant Bohemian Revolt of 1618 and was awarded estates confiscated from the rebels after their defeat at White Mountain in 1620. A series of military victories against the Protestants raised Wallenstein's reputation in the imperial court and in 1625 he raised a large army of 50,000 men to further the Imperial cause. A year later, he administered a crushing defeat to the Protestants at Dessau Bridge. For his successes, Wallenstein became an imperial count palatine and made himself ruler of the lands of the Duchy of Friedland in northern Bohemia.

An imperial generalissimo by land, and Admiral of the Baltic Sea from April 1628, Wallenstein found himself released from service in 1630 after Ferdinand grew wary of his ambition. Several Protestant victories over Catholic armies induced Ferdinand to recall Wallenstein, who then defeated the Swedish king Gustavus Adolphus at Alte Veste. The Swedish king was later killed at the Battle of Lützen.

Wallenstein realised the war could last decades and, during the summer of 1633, arranged a series of armistices to negotiate peace. These proved to be his undoing as plotters accused him of treachery. Dissatisfied with the Emperor's treatment of him, Wallenstein considered allying with the Protestants. However, he was assassinated at Eger in Bohemia by one of the army's officials, with the emperor's approval.

== Early life ==
Wallenstein [Valdštejn] was born on 24 September 1583 in Heřmanice, Bohemia, which is the easternmost and largest region in what was then the Holy Roman Empire, in the present-day Czech Republic, into a poor Protestant Wallenstein branch of an old Czech House of Waldstein, (Note: Many texts, especially English-language books of the 18th and 19th centuries, name him (incorrectly) as Walstein (no 'd').) who owned Heřmanice Castle and seven surrounding villages. He was the son of Vilém (Wilhelm) IV z Valdštejna (von Waldstein) (1547–1595) and his wife, Markéta, Baroness Smiřická of Smiřice (1555–1593).

They had raised him bilingually – the father spoke both Czech and German while his mother preferred Czech – yet Wallenstein in his childhood had a better command of Czech than of German. His parents' religious affiliations were Lutheranism and Utraquist Hussitism. After their deaths, Albrecht for two years lived with his maternal uncle Heinrich (Jindřich) Slavata of Chlum and Košumberk (1549–1599), a member of the Unity of the Brethren (Bohemian Brethren), and adopted his uncle's religious affiliation. His uncle sent him to the brethren's school at Košumberk Castle in Eastern Bohemia.

In 1597, Albrecht was sent to the Protestant Latin school at Goldberg (now Złotoryja, Poland) in Silesia, where the then-German environment led him to hone his German language skills. While German became Wallenstein's "work" language, he is said to have continued to curse in Czech. On 29 August 1599, Wallenstein continued his education at the Protestant University of Altdorf near Nuremberg, Franconia, where he was often engaged in brawls and épée fights, leading to his imprisonment in the town prison. He beat his servant so badly he had to purchase him a new suit of clothes on top of paying compensation.

In February 1600, Albrecht left Altdorf and travelled around the Holy Roman Empire, France and Italy, where he studied at the universities of Bologna and Padua. By this time, Wallenstein was fluent in German, Czech, Latin and Italian, was able to understand Spanish, and spoke some French.

Wallenstein then joined the army of the Emperor Rudolf II in Hungary, where, under the command of Giorgio Basta, he saw two years of armed service (1604–1606) in the Long Turkish War against the Ottoman Turks and Hungarian rebels.

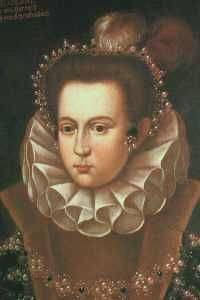
Countess Isabelle von Harrach, Wallenstein's second wife

In 1604, his younger sister, Kateřina Anna of Waldstein (1584–1605), married the leader of the Moravian Protestants, Karel the Older of Zierotin (1564–1636). He then studied at the University of Olomouc (matriculating in 1606). His contact with the Olomouc Jesuits is considered to be at least partially responsible for his conversion to Catholicism that same year. The contributory factor to his conversion may have been the Counter-Reformation policy of the Habsburgs that effectively barred Protestants from being appointed to higher offices at court in Bohemia and in Moravia, and the impressions he gathered in Catholic Italy. However, there are no sources clearly indicating the reasons for Wallenstein's conversion, except for a subjunctive anecdote by his contemporary Count Franz Christoph von Khevenhüller (1588–1650) about the Virgin Mary saving Wallenstein's life when he fell from a window in Innsbruck. Wallenstein was later made a member of the Order of the Golden Fleece.

In 1607, based on recommendations by his brother-in-law, Zierotin, and another relative, Adam of Waldstein, often mistakenly referred to as his uncle, Wallenstein was made chamberlain at the court of Matthias, and later also chamberlain to archdukes Ferdinand and Maximilian.

In 1609, Wallenstein married the Czech Anna Lucretia of Víckov, née Nekšová of Landek (1582–1614), the wealthy widow of Arkleb of Víckov who owned the towns of Vsetín, Lukov, Rymice and Všetuly/Holešov (all in eastern Moravia). She was three years older than Wallenstein, and he inherited her estates after her death in 1614.

He used his wealth to win favour, offering and commanding 200 horses for Archduke Ferdinand of Styria for his war with Venice in 1617, thereby relieving the fortress of Gradisca from the Venetian siege. He later endowed a monastery in his late wife's name and had her reburied there.

In 1623, Wallenstein married Countess Isabella Katharina von Harrach (1601–1655), daughter of Count Karl von Harrach and his wife, Baroness Maria Elisabeth von Schrattenbach (1563–1653). They had two children: a son who died in infancy and a surviving daughter, Countess Maria Elisabeth von Kaunitz (1626–1662). Examples of the couple's correspondence survive. The two marriages made him one of the wealthiest men in the Bohemian Crown.

== Thirty Years' War ==
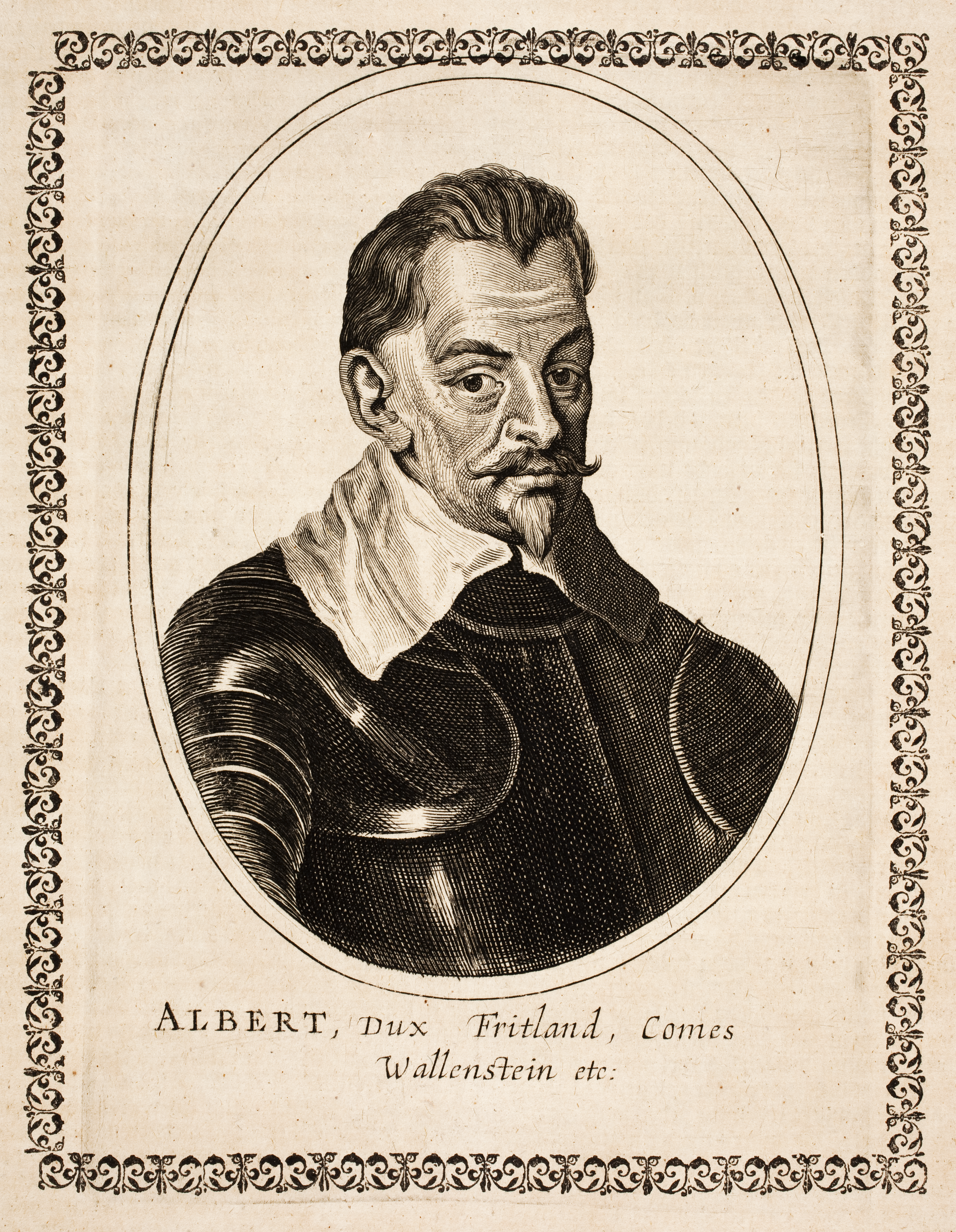
Engraving of Albrecht von Wallenstein

The Thirty Years' War began in 1618 when the estates of Bohemia rebelled against Ferdinand of Styria and elected Frederick V of the Palatinate, the leader of the Protestant Union, as their new king. Wallenstein associated himself with the cause of the Catholics and the Habsburg dynasty. In the summer of 1618, Count Jindřich Matyáš Thurn led 10,000 troops into Moravia to secure their loyalty to the rebellion. Nobles who wished for a rapprochement with Ferdinand faced a choice. Senior nobleman Zierotin's son-in-law, Georg von Nachod, commanded the Moravian cavalry and his brother-in-law, Wallenstein, the infantry. Both decided to take their regiment into Austria. Nachod's troops rebelled and he fled for his life. Wallenstein's major demanded authorisation from the Estates upon which Wallenstein drew his sword and ran him through, "A fresh major was immediately appointed and displayed greater tractability". Deserting the Bohemians, he marched his regiment to Vienna taking with him the Moravian treasury. There, however, the authorities told him that the money would go back to the Moravians – but he had shown his loyalty to Ferdinand, the future Emperor.

Wallenstein equipped a regiment of cuirassiers and won great distinction under Charles Bonaventure de Longueval, 2nd Count of Bucquoy in the wars against Ernst von Mansfeld and Gabriel Bethlen (both supporters of the Bohemian revolt) in Moravia. Wallenstein recovered his lands (which the rebels had seized in 1619) and after the Battle of White Mountain (8 November 1620), he secured the estates belonging to his mother's family and confiscated tracts of Protestant lands.

He grouped his new possessions into a territory called Friedland (Frýdlant) in northern Bohemia. A series of successes in battle led to Wallenstein becoming in 1622 an imperial count palatine, in 1623 a prince, and in 1625 Duke of Friedland. Wallenstein proved an able administrator of the duchy and sent a large representation to Prague to emphasize his nobility.

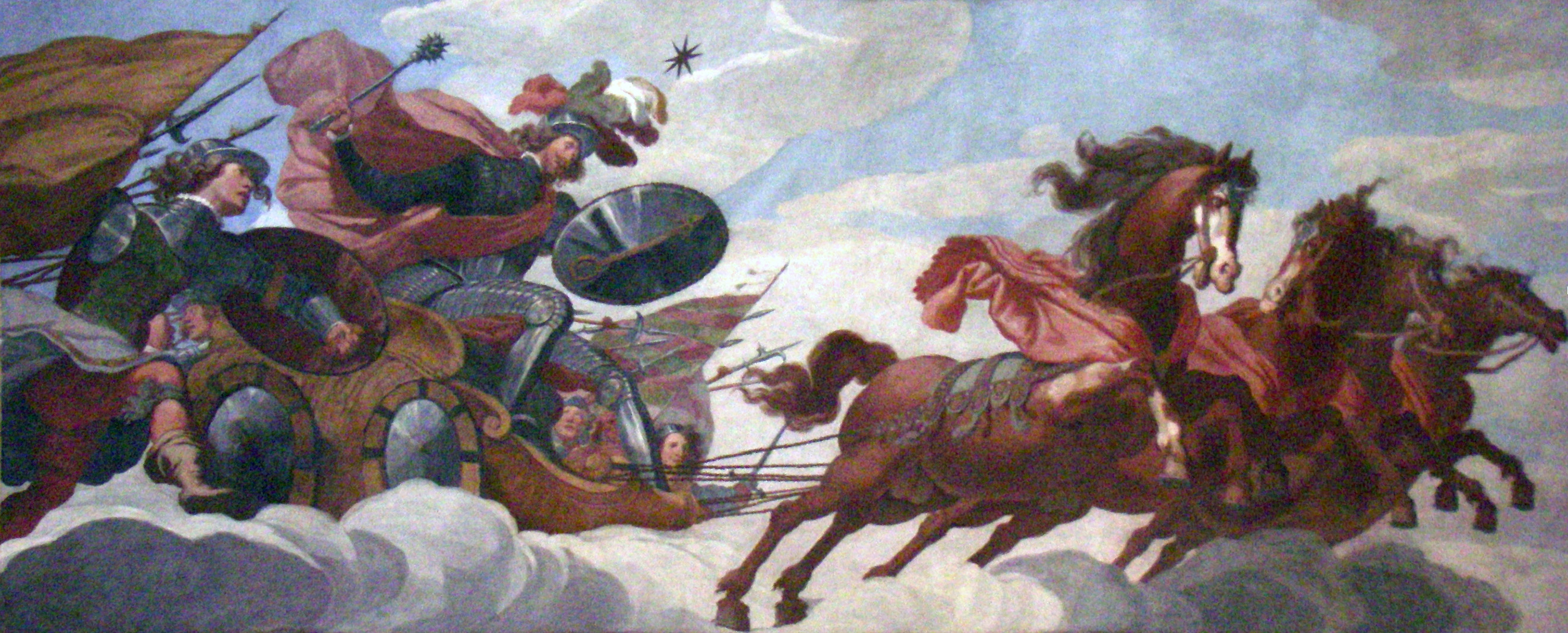
Wallenstein depicted as Mars, the god of war, riding the sky in a chariot pulled by four horses. Ceiling decoration in the main hall of the Wallenstein Palace

In order to aid Ferdinand (elected Holy Roman Emperor in 1619) against the Northern Protestants and to produce a balance in the army of the Catholic League under Johann Tserclaes, Count of Tilly, Wallenstein offered to raise a whole army for the imperial service following the bellum se ipsum alet principle, and received his final commission on 25 July 1625. Wallenstein's successes as a military commander brought him fiscal credit, which in turn enabled him to receive loans to buy lands, many of them being the former estates of conquered Bohemian nobles. He used his credit to grant loans to Ferdinand II, which were repaid through lands and titles. Wallenstein's popularity soon recruited 30,000 (not long afterwards 50,000) men. The two armies worked together over 1625–27, at first against Mansfeld. Having beaten Mansfeld at Dessau (25 April 1626), Wallenstein cleared Silesia of the remnants of Mansfeld's army in 1627. His army ravaged and burned down many Silesian towns and villages, including Prudnik, Głogówek, Żory, Pszczyna, Bytom, Rybnik, Koźle, and Strzelce Opolskie.

At this time he bought from the emperor the Duchy of Sagan (in Silesia). He then joined Tilly in the struggle against Christian IV of Denmark, and afterwards gained as a reward the Duchies of Mecklenburg, whose hereditary dukes suffered expulsion for having helped the Danish king. This awarding of a major territory to someone of the lower nobility shocked the high-born rulers of many other German states.

Wallenstein assumed the title of "Admiral of the North and Baltic Seas". However, in 1628 he failed to capture Stralsund, which resisted the Capitulation of Franzburg and the subsequent siege with assistance of Danish, Scottish and Swedish troops, a blow that denied him access to the Baltic and the chance to challenge the naval power of the Scandinavian kingdoms and of the Netherlands.

Although he succeeded in defeating Christian IV of Denmark in the Battle of Wolgast and neutralizing Denmark in the subsequent Treaty of Lübeck, the situation further deteriorated when the presence of Imperial Catholic troops on the Baltic and the Emperor's "Edict of Restitution" brought King Gustavus Adolphus of Sweden into the conflict. Wallenstein attempted to aid the forces of the Polish–Lithuanian Commonwealth under Hetman Stanisław Koniecpolski, which were fighting Sweden in 1629. However, Wallenstein failed to engage any major Swedish forces and this significantly affected the outcome of the conflict.

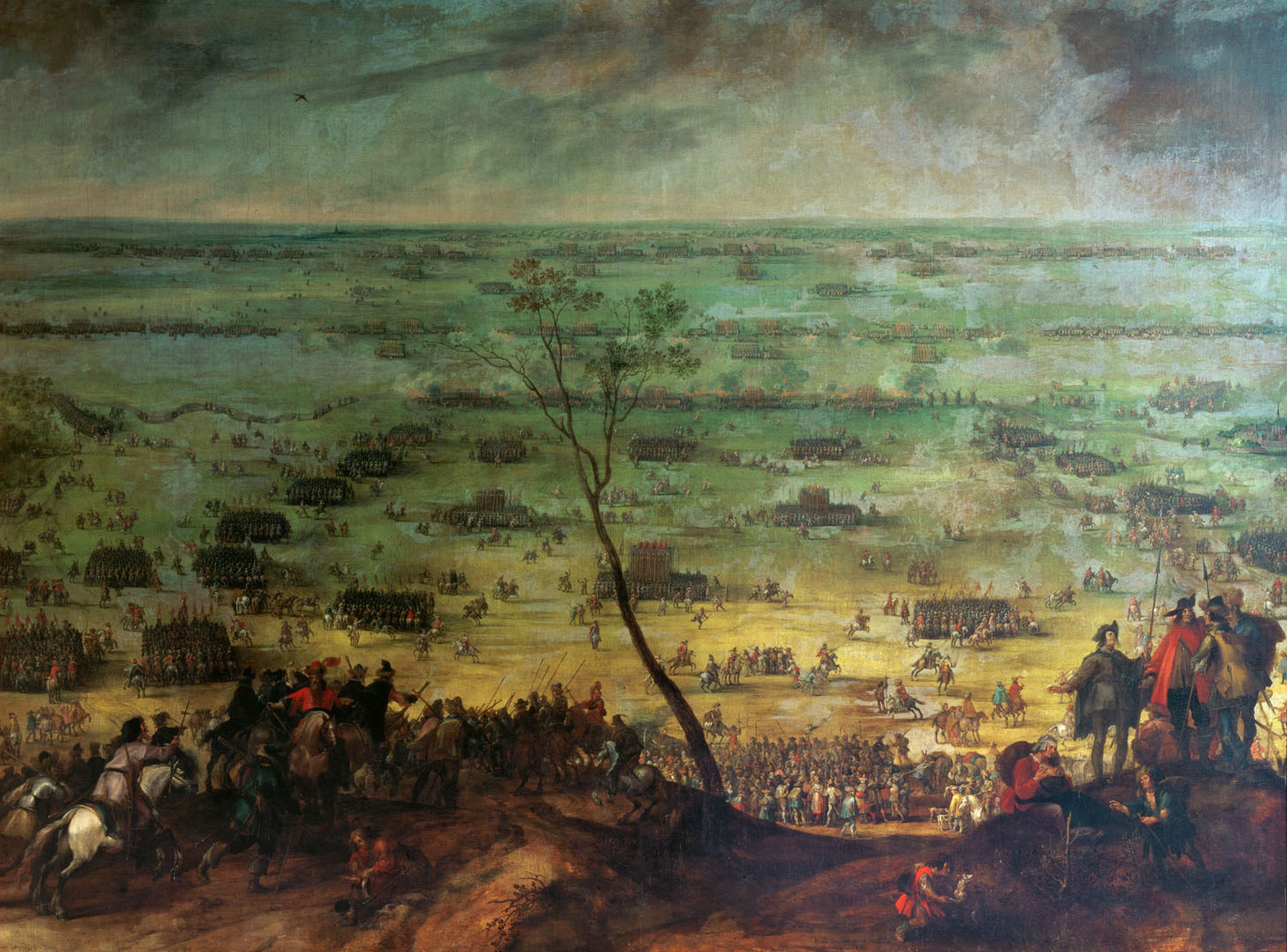
The battle of Lützen was one of the most important battles of the Thirty Years' War, in which the Swedish King Gustavus Adolphus was killed.

Over the course of the war Wallenstein's ambitions and the abuses of his forces had earned him a host of enemies, both Catholic and Protestant, princes and non-princes alike. Ferdinand suspected Wallenstein of planning a coup to take control of the Holy Roman Empire. The Emperor's advisors advocated dismissing him, and in September 1630 envoys were sent to Wallenstein to announce his dismissal. The decision was taken at Regensburg on 13 August 1630 on the following day Wallenstein's financier De Witte committed suicide (having accrued a mountain of debt financing Wallenstein).

Wallenstein gave over his army to General Tilly and retired to Jičín, the capital of his Duchy of Friedland. There he lived in an atmosphere of "mysterious magnificence".

However, circumstances forced Ferdinand to recall Wallenstein into the field. The successes of Gustavus Adolphus over General Tilly at the Battle of Breitenfeld and the Lech (1632), where Tilly was killed, and his advance to Munich and occupation of Bohemia, required a vigorous response. It was during this time that Wallenstein had taken inspiration from the reforms of Gustavus Adolphus, instituting harsh discipline by providing rewards for bravery and punishment for disorder, thievery, and cowardice and with this in mind Wallenstein raised a fresh army within a few weeks and took to the field. He drove the Saxon army from Bohemia and then advanced against Gustavus Adolphus, whom he opposed near Nuremberg and, after the Battle of the Alte Veste, dislodged. In November, the great Battle of Lützen was fought, in which Wallenstein was forced to retreat but, in the confused melee, Gustavus Adolphus was killed. Wallenstein withdrew to winter quarters in Bohemia.

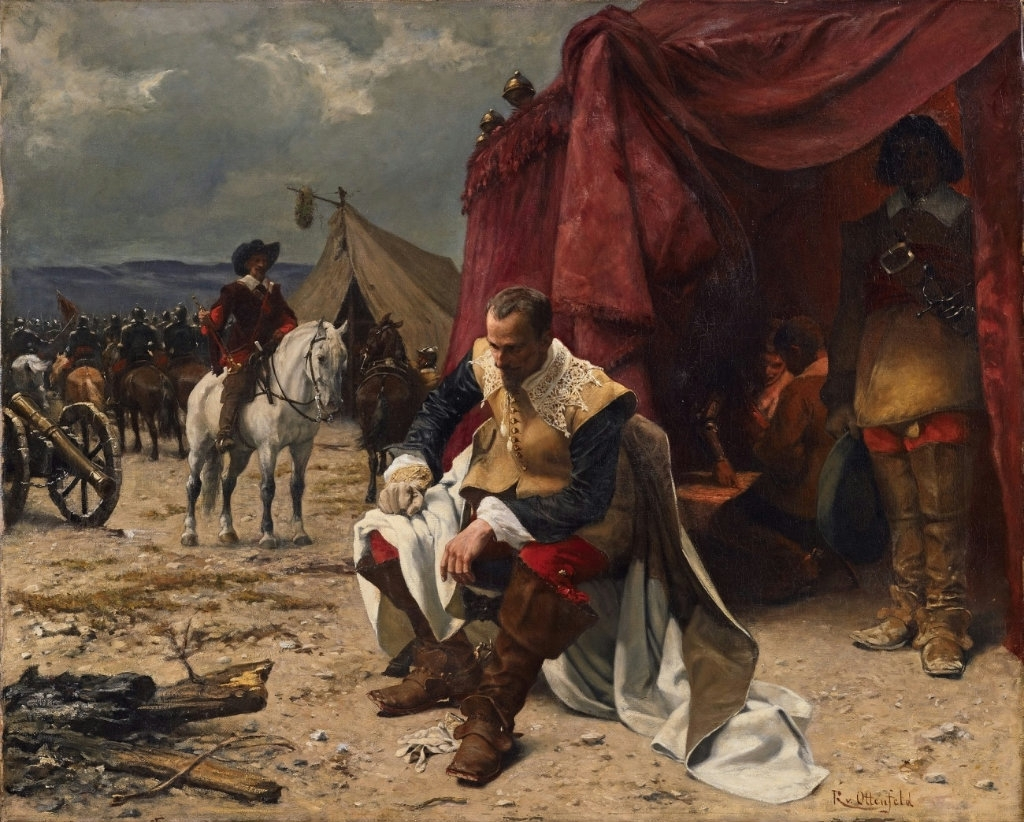
Wallenstein's camp

In the campaigning of 1633, Wallenstein's apparent unwillingness to attack the enemy caused much concern in Vienna and in Spain. At this time the dimensions of the war had grown more European, and Wallenstein had begun preparing to desert the Emperor. He expressed anger at Ferdinand's refusal to revoke the Edict of Restitution. Historic records tell little about his secret negotiations but some sources indicated he was preparing to force a "just peace" on the Emperor "in the interests of united Germany". With this apparent "plan" he entered into negotiations with Saxony, Brandenburg, Sweden, and France. Apparently the Habsburgs' enemies tried to draw him to their side. In any case, he gained little support. Anxious to make his power felt, he resumed the offensive against the Swedes and Saxons, winning his last victory at Steinau on the Oder in October. He then resumed negotiations.

== Assassination ==
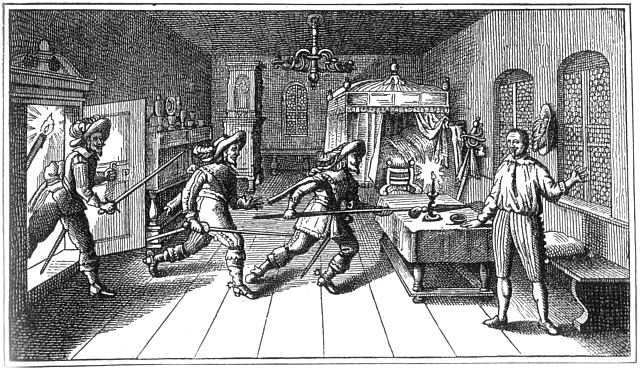
The killing of Wallenstein in Eger/Cheb

In December, Wallenstein retired with his army to Bohemia, around Pilsen (now Plzeň). Vienna soon definitely convinced itself of his treachery, a secret court found him guilty, and the Emperor looked seriously for a means of getting rid of him (a successor in command, the later emperor Ferdinand III, was already waiting). Wallenstein was aware of the plan to replace him, but felt confident that when the army came to decide between him and the Emperor the decision would be in his favour.

On 24 January 1634 the Emperor signed a secret patent (shown only to certain officers of Wallenstein's army) removing him from his command. Finally an open patent charging Wallenstein with high treason was signed on 18 February and published in Prague. In the patent, Ferdinand II ordered Wallenstein brought under arrest to Vienna, dead or alive.

Losing the support of his army, Wallenstein now realized the extent of his peril, and on 23 February with a company of some hundred men, he went from Plzeň to Cheb, hoping to meet the Swedes under Prince Bernard.

After his arrival at Cheb, however, certain senior Scottish and Irish officers in his force assassinated him on the night of 25 February. To carry out the assassination, a regiment of dragoons under the command of an Irish colonel, Walter Butler, and the Scots colonels Walter Leslie and John Gordon first attacked Wallenstein's trusted officers (Adam Trczka, Vilém Kinský, Christian von Ilow, and Henry Neumann), while they attended a feast at Cheb Castle, to which the officers had been invited by Gordon himself.

According to historian, A. E. J. Hollaender, quoting the "holograph account" of Denis MacDonell, aka Dionysius Macdaniel, Irish Captain of Colonel Butler's regiment and participant in the events, Captain Walter Devereux with twelve dragoons and Sergeant Major Geraldine with eight burst into the room from two doors, surprising the feasting guests. Geraldine cried out Vivat Ferdinandus Imperator ("Long live Emperor Ferdinand") with MacDonell responding with Et tota Domus Austriaca ("And the whole House of Austria"). By another account, as quoted in Peter H. Wilson's work on the Thirty Years' War, the conspirators entered the room shouting "Who is a good Imperialist?". All of Wallenstein's loyal officers present were massacred. Trczka alone managed to fight his way out into the courtyard, only to be shot down by a group of musketeers.

A few hours later, Devereux, together with a few companions, broke into the burgomaster's house at the main square where Wallenstein had been lodging, and kicked open the bedroom door. Wallenstein, roused from sleep and unarmed, is said to have asked for quarter but Devereux ran his spear through Wallenstein, killing him. The Emperor rewarded the assassins.

In 1784, his descendant Vincenc von Wallenstein had the remains of the general and his wife transported from the Carthusian monastery in Valdice, after the monastery was abolished in 1782 by Emperor Joseph II, to St. Anne's Chapel in the town of Mnichovo Hradiště, in the Czech Republic.

== Obsession with horoscopes ==
While a student at Padua, Wallenstein had followed the lessons of the prominent astrologer Andrea Argoli, who had also initiated him into the mysteries of the Kabbalah.

In 1608, Wallenstein commissioned the imperial court mathematician Johannes Kepler to issue his first horoscope through intermediaries. It seems that he did not receive the horoscope until late 1614 or early 1615. "Why delivery should have taken so long is anyone's guess. Perhaps Kepler had been defrauded too often and did not want too hand it over until he had his promised fee and that had been delayed." Wallenstein, through the same intermediary (Gerhard von Taxis) reached out to Kepler again in 1625 for amendments and amplifications on the chart.

Consulting an astrologer was not unusual at the time. Though astrology had been forbidden by the Church at the Council of Trent, Emperor Rudolph II (a nominally Catholic monarch and the ruler of Bohemia where Wallenstein served as his vassal) frequently consulted astrologers as did many at his court. Anyone who was wealthy and influential often had one. After a brief warning not to trust the stars alone, Kepler wrote that his client had a busy, restless mind who strove for new, untried or strange means. The horoscope characterized Wallenstein as a person with great ambition who strove for power. Dangerous enemies may challenge him, but he would mostly win. Wallenstein relied obsessively on horoscopes for the next several years prior to his death in 1634. He employed Giovanni Battista Seni as his personal astrologer and advisor during the last four years of his life.

== Chronic illness ==
Wallenstein began to suffer joint inflammation in the feet in 1620. It was believed to be a case of gout, or by excessive drinking. His condition deteriorated rapidly.

In November 1629 he became so ill that he lay down for weeks. In March 1630 he travelled to Karlovy Vary (Karlsbad) to seek relief. He found it difficult to walk. At the Battle of Lützen in November 1632, he mounted his horse in extreme pain. Half a year later he was no longer able to ride. On his flight to Eger in 1634 he had to be moved around in a wagon or lying in a transport litter.

In the 1970s the skeleton of Wallenstein was examined. The inner core of the leg bones showed abnormal changes that suggest terminal syphilis.

== Legacy ==
=== Contemporaries ===
Shortly after Wallenstein's assassination, several plays, poems and newspapers appeared, as well as a large number of pamphlets describing his life and death. Most of these early adaptations are completely unknown today and have often been lost.

=== Literature ===
==== Schiller's Wallenstein ====
Schiller first commemorated Wallenstein as a historian in his extensive history of the Thirty Years' War.

In his play trilogy, completed in 1788, he concentrated mostly on the last period of Wallenstein's life (Pilsen and Eger). The literary depiction largely corresponds to the historical facts with the only exception being the lovers – Ottavio Piccolomini's fictional son Max and Wallenstein's daughter Thekla. Although Wallenstein had a daughter, Maria Elisabeth, she was only ten years old when he died, and Piccolomini's adopted son Joseph Silvio Max Piccolomini was only one year older.

==== Alfred Döblin's novel ====
Wallenstein is also a main figure in Alfred Döblin's eponymous novel. The title of the novel, published in 1920, is misleading, as it does not focus on Wallenstein, but rather on Emperor Ferdinand II, whom Döblin consistently calls Ferdinand the Other (German: Ferdinand der Andere). The sections of the book are also often misleadingly named. For example, the first book is called Maximilian of Bavaria, although it is almost exclusively about the emperor and his actions that are described. The supposed protagonist of this part is only mentioned in passing.

In the second book of the novel, Wallenstein is introduced rather marginally. He only becomes present with the events during his work within the Bohemian coin consortium. This corresponds to Döblin's interpretation of Wallenstein in the novel as a whole. For Döblin, Wallenstein's economic genius predominates; battles are only fought when they cannot be avoided, as Döblin mainly portrays Wallenstein as a modern manager of long-term war planning. Wallenstein is indifferent to religious questions, forcing his partners and opponents to admit to a lie of which they were not even aware. Just like Wallenstein, they strive for power and wealth but hide this pursuit behind their religious convictions and assurances of peace. Döblin's Wallenstein has no political vision, and even less does he want to reform the empire. All that matters to him is wealth and power. Döblin's judgment of Wallenstein is thus close to Marxist historiography, which sees all action as the result of economic motives.

==== Biographies by Hellmut Diwald and Golo Mann ====
Hellmut Diwald first began to write a biography of Wallenstein in 1967 with the publication of Leopold von Ranke's Geschichte Wallensteins (English: History of Wallenstein), to which he added a hundred-page introduction. Two years later, his portrayal of Wallenstein appeared, which was soon regarded as a new standard reference. Golo Mann must have realized this two years before the publication of his biography Wallenstein. Sein Leben erzählt von Golo Mann. "He was downright disgusted by the apologetic Hellmut Diwald" (Klaus-Dietmar Henke). The editor of the magazine Der Spiegel, Rudolf Augstein, judged Mann's work to be "a highly subjective representation that pretends to be objective".

==== El Prodigio de Alemania ====
He is also the subject of Calderón de la Barca's play El Prodigio de Alemania.

=== Festivals ===
In Memmingen, the Wallenstein Festival (Wallensteinfestspiele) is held every four years to commemorate Wallenstein's stay in the town in 1630. In Altdorf bei Nürnberg, the Wallenstein Festival (Wallenstein-Festspiele) has been held every three years since 1894. The plays Wallenstein in Altdorf and an adaptation of Schiller's Wallenstein trilogy are performed. In the city of Stralsund, the Wallenstein Days (Wallensteintagen), the largest historical festival in northern Germany, takes place every year and commemorates the liberation of the city from the siege by Wallenstein in 1628.

=== Museums ===
By imperial decree of Franz Joseph I on 28 February 1863, Wallenstein was included in the list of "Austria's most famous warlords and generals worthy of eternal admiration" and a life-size statue was erected in the Feldherrenhalle of the then newly built Imperial-Royal Court Weapons Museum, now the Museum of Military History in Vienna. The statue was created in 1877 by the sculptor Ludwig Schimek (1837–1886) from Carrara marble.

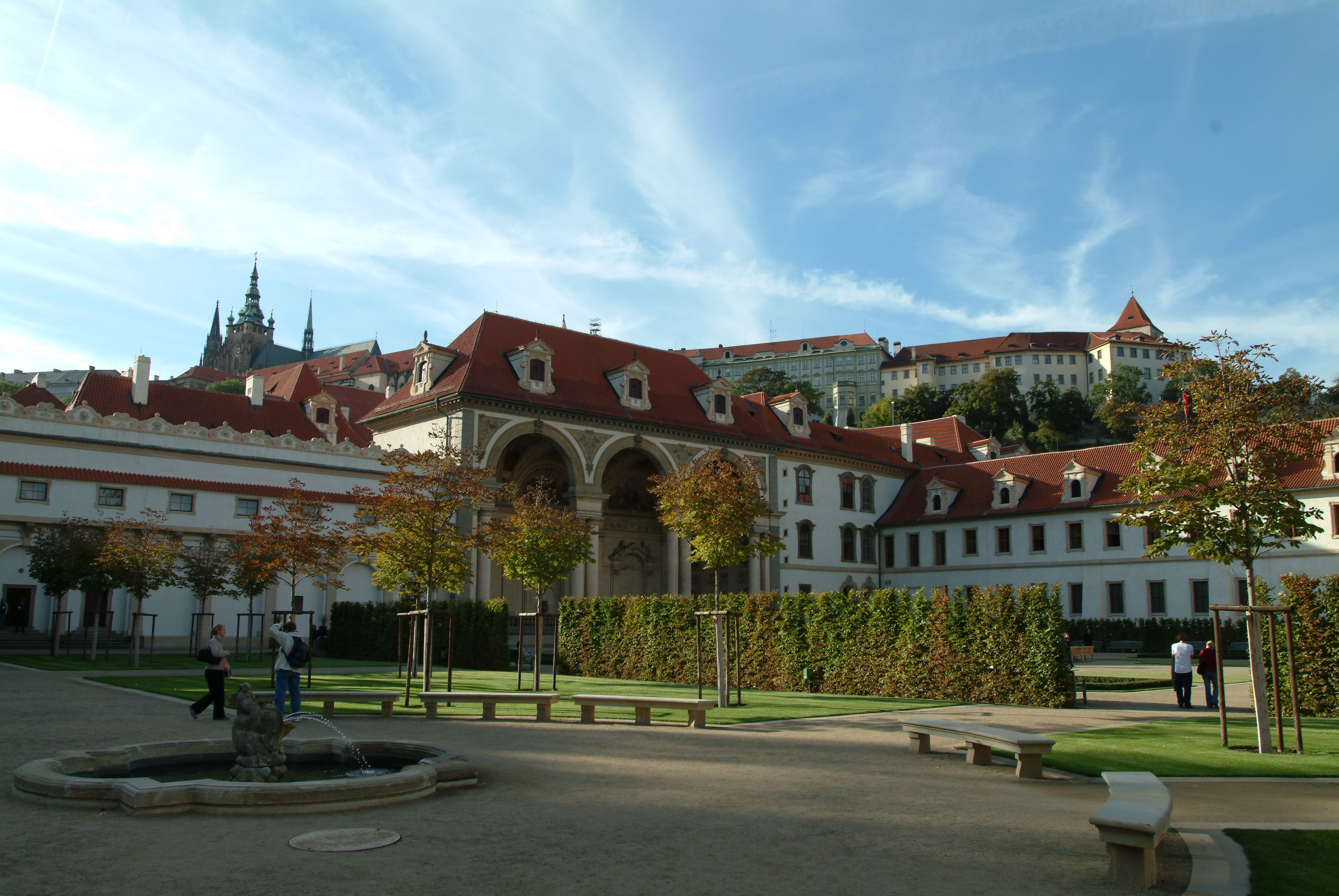
The Wallenstein Palace in Prague

The Cheb Regional Museum has a permanent exhibition dedicated to Wallenstein. In addition to portraits and paintings, his stuffed horse, the room where he was murdered and his murder weapon, are on display. In the museum of Lützen Castle, Wallenstein is portrayed as a general in the Thirty Years' War and in the Battle of Lützen.

A visit to the Wallestein Palace, which the general had built between 1623 and 1630 in Prague's district of Malá Strana, offers an insight into the life of the Generalissimo. The Czech National Museum produced a large exhibition about Wallenstein at the same palace from 15 November 2007 to 15 February 2008.

=== Music ===
Composer Bedřich Smetana honored Wallenstein in his 1859 symphonic poem Wallenstein's Camp, which was originally intended as an overture to a play by Schiller.

Josef Rheinberger composed a symphonic tone painting Wallenstein in 1866. The work in four movements is also called a symphony. It was premiered in Munich on 26 November 1866.

Composer Vincent d'Indy honored Wallenstein in his 1871 symphonic triptych Wallenstein.

=== Other ===
Wallenstein is examined by economist Arthur Salz in his book Wallenstein als Merkantilist (Wallenstein as Mercantilist).

A Czech television film Popel a hvězdy (The Ashes and The Stars) about Albrecht von Wallenstein was produced in 1990 by Czech Television. Jiří Adamíra stars as Wallenstein.

A German documentary Die Deutschen (The Germans) dramatized Albrecht von Wallenstein in season 1, episode 5 Wallenstein und der Krieg (Wallenstein and the War), it was produced in 2008.

== Sources ==
- Cristini, Luca. 1618–1648 la guerra dei 30 anni. Volume 1 da 1618 al 1632 2007 ISBN 978-88-903010-1-8 and Volume 2 da 1632 al 1648 2007 ISBN 978-88-903010-2-5
- Chisholm, Hugh, ed. (1911). "Wallenstein, Albrecht Wenzel Eusebius von" . Encyclopædia Britannica. Vol. 28 (11th ed.). Cambridge University Press. pp. 280–282.
- Mann, Golo. Wallenstein: His Life Narrated, 1976, Holt, Rinehart and Winston (ISBN 0030918847).
- Pike, John. Gustavus v Wallenstein, 2023, Pen & Sword Books Ltd. (ISBN 978-1-399-01265-2)
- Roeck, Bernd (2026). Wallenstein. Gewalt, Geld, Glaube. Eine Biographie [Wallenstein. Violence, money, faith. A biography]. Munich: Beck, ISBN 978-3-406-85135-3.
- Steinberg, S.H. (20 July 1998). "Albrecht von Wallenstein". Encyclopædia Britannica.
