= Adam Erdmann Trčka of Lípa =

Bohemian nobleman

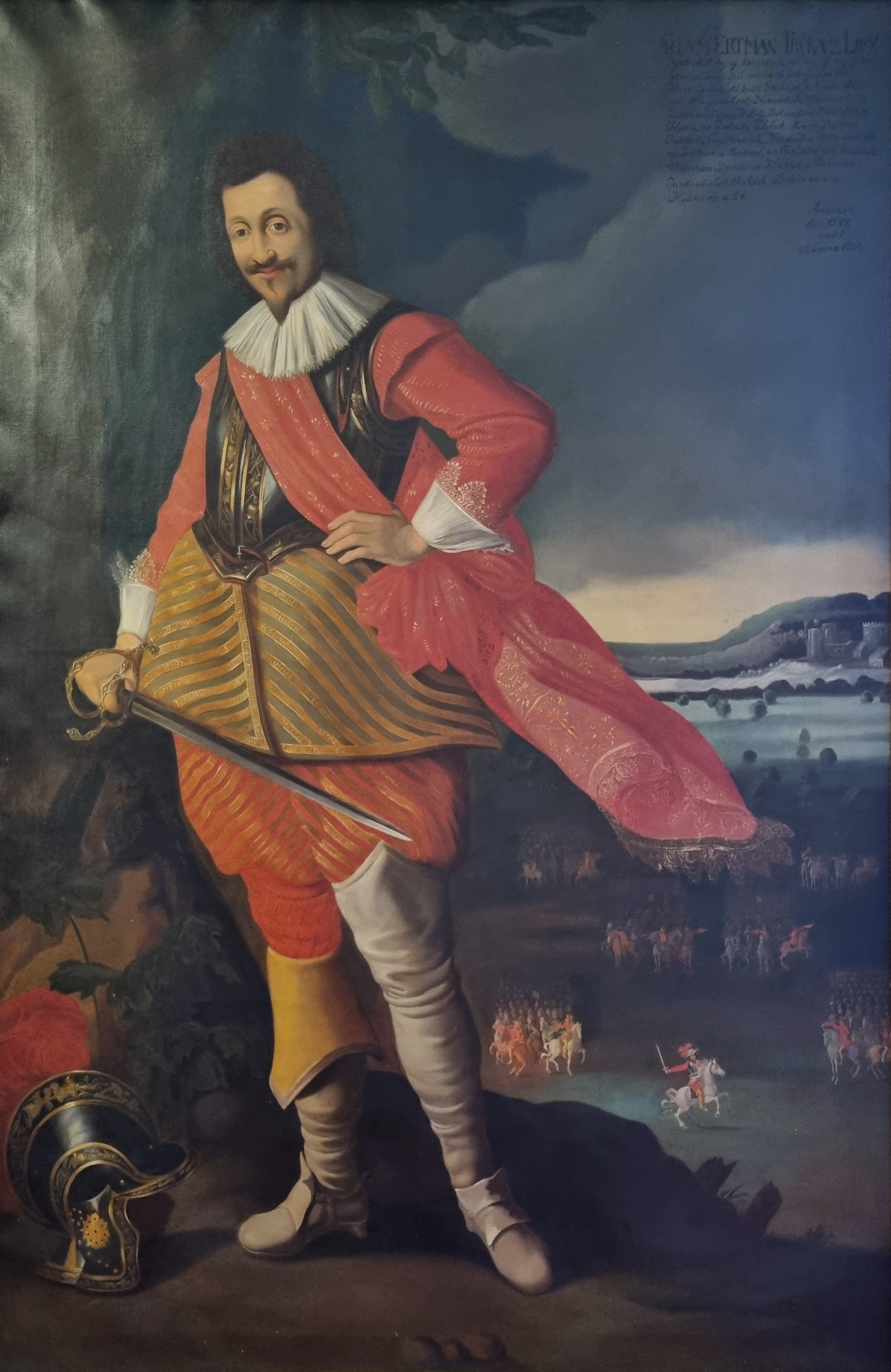
- Trčka
- Born: 1599
- Died: 25 February 1634 (aged 34–35) Eger, Holy Roman Empire
- Allegiance: Holy Roman Empire
- Service years: 1626–1634
- Rank: Lieutenant field marshal
- Conflicts: Thirty Years' War: Battle of Lützen

Adam Erdmann Trčka of Lípa (Czech: Adam Erdmann Trčka z Lípy, German: Adam Erdmann Trčka von Lípa; 1599 – 25 February 1634) was a Bohemian nobleman and lieutenant field marshal, who fought during the course of the Thirty Years' War. He became a close associate of Imperial Generalissimo Albrecht von Wallenstein. He was killed along with other loyal officers in an assassination plot of Wallenstein.

== Biography ==
Adam was born in 1599, to Rudolf Trčka and Marie Magdalene of Lobkowicz. The Trčka and Lobkowicz families were two of the most powerful Bohemian noble families at the time, making him the heir of vast estates. Those included Lipnice, Vlašim, Pelhřimov, Louňovice, Mladá Vožice, Heřmanův Městec, Říčany, Světlá, Habry, Želiv, Chotěboř, Opočno, Třebechovice, Polná, Smidary and Kounice. The Trčkas supported the Bohemian Estates at the outbreak of the Bohemian Revolt in 1618, without directly taking part in the fighting. In the aftermath of the defeat of the rebels, numerous Trčka family estates were confiscated. Trčka entered the ranks of the Imperial army in 1626. On 28 August 1627, Trčka married Maximiliana von Harrach, the daughter of Karl von Harrach, Imperial privy councilor and one of the emperor's most influential advisors. Maximiliana's sisters were married to count Max of Waldstein-Wartenberg and Imperial Generalissimo Albrecht von Wallenstein respectively. He then converted from Utraquism to Catholicism, securing his position at the forefront of Bohemia's political elite during the contemporary recatholicization campaign in Bohemia. His parents followed his example, taking back their lost estates. Nevertheless, his mother Marie Magdalene continued to practise Utraquism in secret.

In the meantime, Trčka's military career progressed quickly as he had gained Wallenstein's trust, delivering his messages to Emperor Ferdinand II. On 18 February 1628, the emperor bestowed upon Trčka the title of Hochwohlgeboren. In 1629, a peasant uprising broke out in the districts of Neustadt and Nachod (Trčka and Wallenstein's personal estates), the rebels were opposed to the Catholicization of the area. Trčka suppressed the uprising with Wallenstein's aid. On 23 February 1630, Wallenstein ordered Imperial field marshal Ramboldo, Count of Collalto to transfer seven flags of his infantry regiment to Trčka, whom he promoted to colonel. The emperor declared the order to be invalid, after troops under Trčka's command were accused of extorting money from the citizens of Hradec Králové, Nymburk and Velvary. On 1 October, Trčka received the 500-man, Haugwitz Harquebusier Regiment instead, possibly after disproving the allegations. Trčka spent the following year recruiting soldiers for the needs of the Imperial army. In October–November 1631, Trčka represented Wallenstein in secret meetings with Swedish envoy Jindřich Matyáš Thurn, who failed to persuade Wallenstein to switch sides and join the Swedish army. In 1632, Trčka campaigned in Bohemia and around Nuremberg, on 6 November his cavalry distinguished themselves in the Battle of Lützen. He was then sent to Preßnitz. He returned to Bohemia before he was able to carry his assignment due to the death of his mother on 8 January 1633. He inherited his mother's estates, as the will excluded his brother Wilhelm.

From July until September, he represented the Imperial side in negotiations with the Saxon general Hans Georg von Arnim-Boitzenburg, securing several truces. On 6 October, Wallenstein requested Trčka to be promoted from colonel to lieutenant field marshal, the order was approved by the emperor eight days later. He took part in the Silesian and Brandenburg campaigns of that year, which resulted in the capture of Grossglogau, Frankfurt, Görlitz, and Bautzen. He then marched back to Bohemia passing through Kytlice, Šluknov and Litoměřice where his force united with that of Matthias Gallas.

=== Trčka and the fall of Wallenstein ===
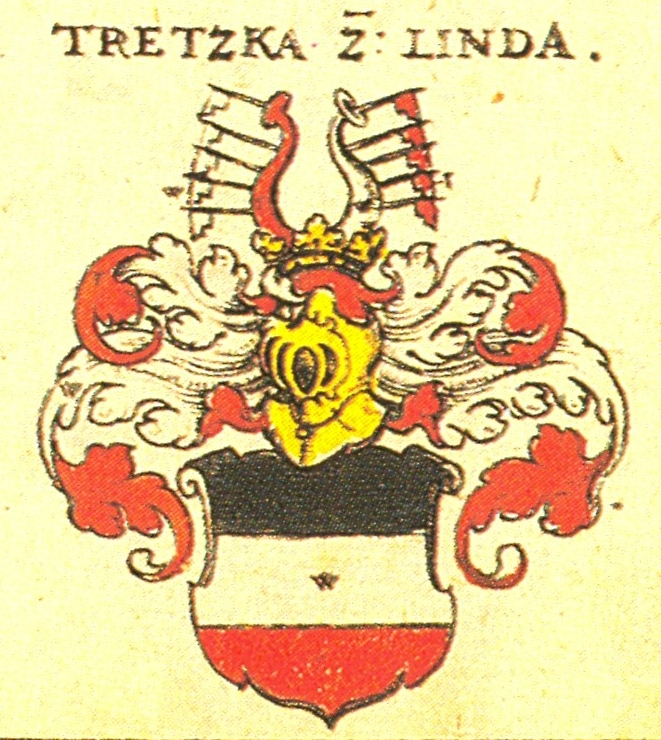
Coat of Arms of Trčka von Lípa

Wallenstein was increasingly criticized for his passivity in face of a Swedish incursion into Bavaria and the collapse of Lorraine under French pressure. His dislike of courtly life and the influence exerted by the church upon the emperor created an axis of undercover opposition that launched a smear campaign against him. On 11 January 1634, Gundakar, Prince of Liechtenstein sent Ferdinand II an official request, recommending Wallenstein's liquidation. A day later, Wallenstein summoned his colonels to sign the First Pilsner Reverse, a declaration of personal loyalty, 49 of them signed immediately while Hans Ulrich von Schaffgotsch and Scherffenberg gathered signatures in Silesia and Upper Austria respectively. Numerous commanders signed the Reverse so as not to arouse suspicion, while at the same time a party centered around Ottavio Piccolomini began circulating an anonymous tract that summarized the army's grudges against Wallenstein. On 17 February, Scherffenberg was arrested in Vienna. On 18 February, a second patent was released accusing Wallenstein of conspiracy and condemning him to death, its publication was delayed so as not to split the army in two. Wallenstein's letters refuting the accusations against him remained unanswered. After realizing that the emperor was positioning troops in such a manner as to surround him he decided to flee to the Swedes. Wallenstein, Trčka and other loyal officers departed from their headquarters on 22 February along with 1,300 men. Irish colonel Walter Butler, the leader of a group of Irish and Scottish officers hired by Piccolomini to assassinate Wallenstein, was ordered by the unsuspecting general to follow them with his 900 dragoons. On 24 February, Wallenstein reached Eger, where most of the trusted troops camped outside of the town as it was already garrisoned by Butler's dragoons and other anti-Wallenstein elements. The following day Christian von Ilow held a series of meetings with the would be assassins trying to persuade them to remain loyal to their commander. They made the decision to go on with Piccolomini's plan, fearing that they would be branded as rebels should they fail to do so. At 6.00 p.m., Wallenstein's inner circle consisting of Ilow, Trčka, Vilém Kinský and Captain Niemann were invited by the conspirators to the city's castle for a formal dinner. During the course of the dinner a servant nodded indicating that the conspirators were ready. Six dragoons burst into the dining hall shouting, "Who is a good Imperialist?" Butler, John Gordon and Walter Leslie rose from the table yelling "Long live Ferdinand!" Kinský was killed immediately, others met a similar fate. Wallenstein was killed in his residence at 10:00 p.m. An imperial decree equated the participants in the assassinations with official executioners. The purge continued with the execution of Schaffgotsch; a number of generals were imprisoned and lost their commands, while the possessions of the accused were confiscated and redistributed.
