= Bellum se ipsum alet =

Phrase attributed to Cato the Elder

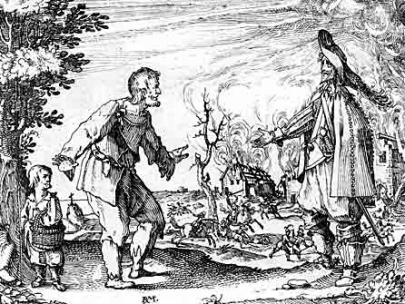
A peasant begs a mercenary for mercy in front of his burning farm during the Thirty Years' War. Contemporary illustration.

The Latin phrase bellum se ipsum alet (English: The war will feed itself) or bellum se ipsum alit (English: The war feeds itself, French: La guerre doit se nourrir elle-même), and its German rendering Der Krieg ernährt den Krieg describe the military strategy of feeding and funding armies primarily with the resources of occupied territories. It is closely associated with mass starvation in the population of these territories. The phrase, coined by Ancient Roman statesman Cato the Elder, is primarily associated with the Thirty Years' War (1618–1648).

== The phrase ==
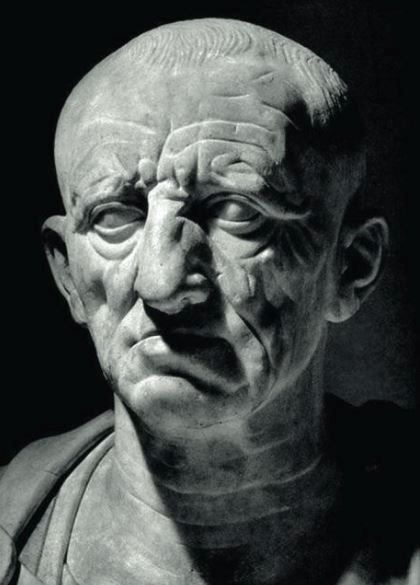
Cato, coined the phrase in 195 BC

The phrase bellum se ipsum alet was first mentioned in Ab urbe condita libri XXXIV, 9,12, written by Roman historian Titus Livius (Livy) (59 BC–17 AD), who attributed it to Cato Marcus Porcius ("the Elder", 234–149 BC), a statesman in Ancient Rome. According to Livy, Cato in 195 BC used the phrase during the conquest of Hispania when he refused to buy additional supplies for his army in Iberia (Hispania, modern Spain and Portugal).

The slogan became prominent in reference to the Thirty Years' War. Friedrich Schiller In his retrospect, semi-historical drama Wallenstein (I/2, The Piccolomini), has Johann Ludwig Hektor von Isolani, a general in Albrecht von Wallenstein's army, say these words in a conversation with other commanders:

Illo: Ei was! Es war ein gutes Jahr, der Bauer kann
Schon wieder geben!
Questenberg: Ja, wenn Sie von Herden
Und Weideplätzen reden, Herr Feldmarschall –
Isolani: Der Krieg ernährt den Krieg. Gehn Bauern drauf
Ei, so gewinnt der Kaiser mehr Soldaten.
Questenberg: Und wird um so viel Untertanen ärmer!
Isolani: Pah! Seine Untertanen sind wir alle!

Translation:

Illo: So what! It was a good year, the peasant is able
to give again!
Questenberg: Yes, if you are talking about herds
and pasture grounds, field marshal Sir! –
Isolani: The war nourishes the war. Peasants die,
ah! This way the Emperor gains more soldiers.
Questenberg: And loses so many of his subjects!
Isolani: Pah! We all are his subjects!

== The strategy ==
=== Thirty Years' War ===
Prior to the Thirty Years' War, the laws of the Holy Roman Empire provided for funding armies by raising special war taxes. The funds needed for the large armies raised during the war however exceeded the income of the respective warlords from those taxes, and forced them to resort to additional, unfavourable measures such as borrowing of money and currency depreciation. In the course of the war, the principle of bellum se ipsum alet was applied in two phases: First, the food supplies needed for the army were derived directly from the territory occupied by this army. Later, the pay for the soldiers was derived from the occupied territory as well.

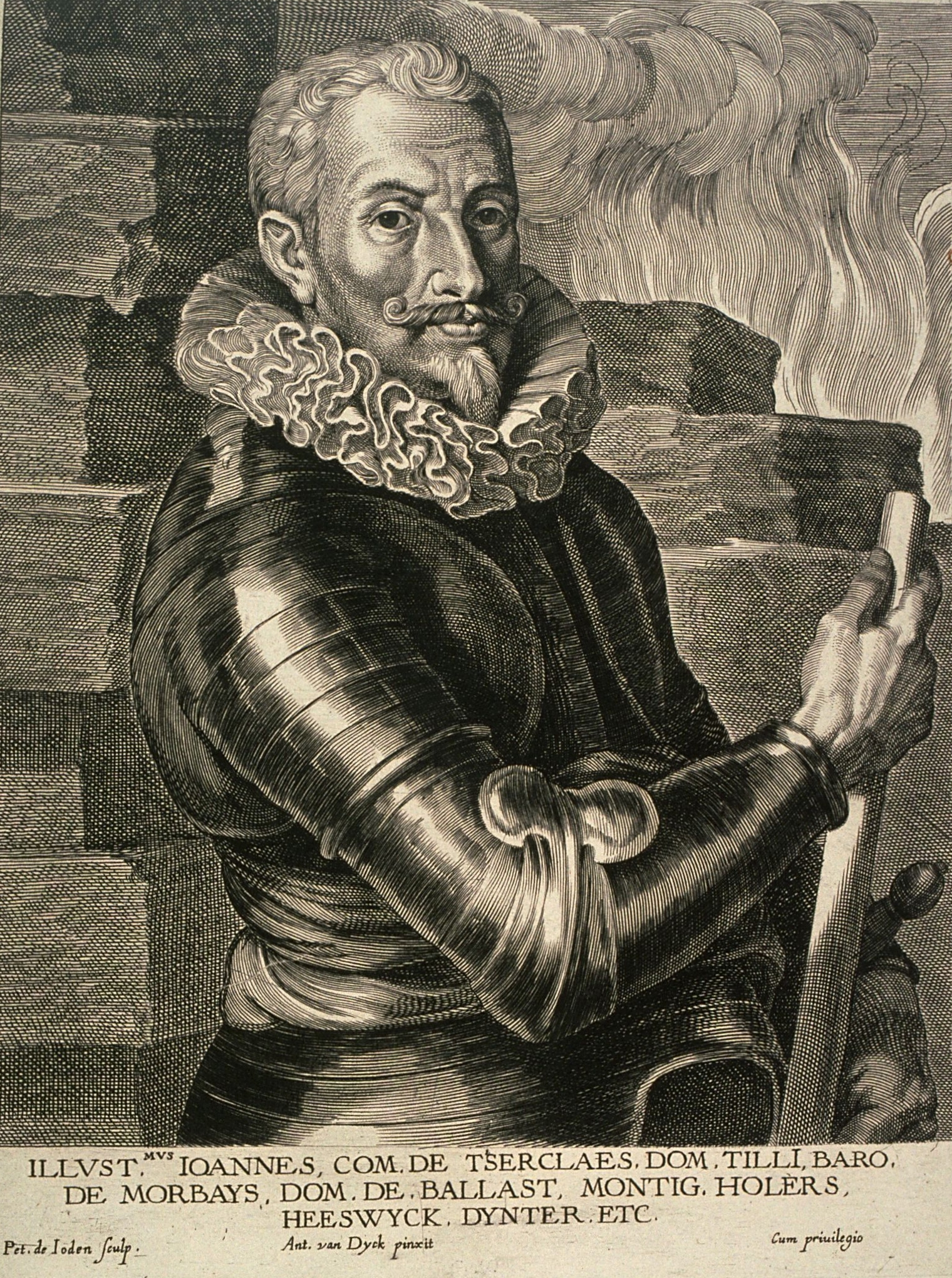
Tilly, the first to implement bellum se ipsum alet on occupied enemy territory in 1623

In 1623, the principle was implemented by the Upper Saxon Circle on its own territory, and by Johann Tserclaes, Count of Tilly, commander of the Catholic League's army, on occupied enemy territory. The Upper Saxon Circle had raised an army for its defense, and dispersed it over its territory. The territory was divided into Kontributionsbezirke ("contribution districts"), each of which had to provide certain amounts of food for the soldiers as well as the horses. The soldiers were quartered in the houses of ordinary people, who had to provide shelter, food and Servisgeld, a defined sum to allow the soldier to buy firewood and salt.

These measures were self-imposed by the circle's nobility, and the local authorities were given the task of their implementation. In contrast, Tilly imposed analogous measures in the same year on a territory he had just conquered, Hersfeld. The contributions he demanded were unreasonably high, and were collected with military means.

In 1625, Albrecht von Wallenstein had promised Holy Roman Emperor Ferdinand II to raise an army and fund it himself. Ferdinand II allowed Wallenstein to exploit occupied territory (Note: Ferdinand II: "[...] in den eroberten Orten und Landschaften zur Erhaltung der Soldatesca leidliche Contributiones und Anlagen zu machen." Krüger (1995), pp.37–38.) with the caveat that money should not be collected by force without his approval. This caveat was however neglected, and the army was fed and paid entirely by contributions and war loot. Subsequently, all armies participating in the war adapted the bellum se ipsum alet principle.

Contributions from occupied territories, divided into Kontributionsbezirke, were collected by military force and by local authorities forced to cooperate. The affected territories were thereby ruined. The need to borrow money to satisfy the military demands during the Thirty Years' War resulted in an indebtedness that many German communities bore until the 18th century.

=== World War II ===
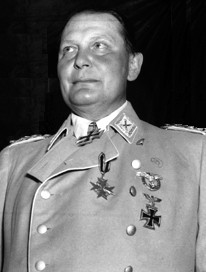
Göring applied bellum se ipsum alet on occupied Soviet territory in 1942

During World War II Nazi Germany invaded the Soviet Union in 1941. The conquered territories did not return as many resources as the Nazis had expected, due to previous shortfalls of the Soviet planned economy and the devastations during the conquest. Thus, Reichsmarschall Hermann Göring implemented restrictions on the local population to prevent the Altreich and the army from falling short of food supplies.

Aware of the consequences of these measures, Göring in September 1941 foretold "the largest starvation since the Thirty Years' War" in the occupied areas. (Note: Göring: "[...] das größte Sterben seit dem Dreißigjährigen Krieg." Neumärker (2007), p.144.) In 1942, he explicitly described the Nazi strategy in these territories as bellum se ipsum alet. (Note: Göring: "Der Krieg ernährt den Krieg. Das wird jetzt ganz groß geschrieben." Neumärker (2007), p.144.)

== See also ==
- Scorched earth, a strategy designed to counter bellum se ipsum alet

== Sources ==
=== Bibliography ===
- Beier, Brigitte (2007). Die Chronik der Deutschen (in German). wissenmedia. ISBN 978-3-577-14374-5.
- Cadiou, François (2008). Hibera in terra miles: les armées romaines et la conquête de l'Hispanie sous la République, 218-45 av. J.-C (in French). Madrid: Casa de Velázquez. ISBN 978-84-96820-07-4.
- Cooper, J. P., ed. (1979). The New Cambridge Modern History Volume 4. CUP Archive. ISBN 0-521-29713-3.
- Demandt, Alexander (1978). Metaphern für Geschichte, Volume 13. Sprachbilder U. Gleichnisse im Histor.-polit. Denken (in German). Beck. ISBN 3-406-04696-7.
- Krüger, Kersten (2005). "Kriegsfinanzen und Reichsrecht". Formung der frühen Moderne (in German). Berlin-Hamburg-Münster: LIT Verlag. ISBN 3-8258-8873-8.
- Kudla, Hubertus, ed. (2001). Lexikon der lateinischen Zitate (in German) (2 ed.). C.H.Beck. ISBN 3-406-47580-9.
- Lautenbach, Ernst (2002). Latein – Deutsch: Zitaten-Lexikon (in German). Berlin-Hamburg-Münster: LIT Verlag. ISBN 3-8258-5652-6.
- Neumärker, Uwe; Knopf, Volker (2007). Görings Revier: Jagd und Politik in der Rominter Heide (in German). Ch. Links Verlag. ISBN 978-3-86153-457-0.
- Schiller, Friedrich (2004) [1798]. Alt, Peter-André (ed.). Sämtliche Werke: Dramen 2 (in German). Hanser Verlag. ISBN 3-446-20503-9.
