= Heřmanice (Náchod District) =

- Municipality
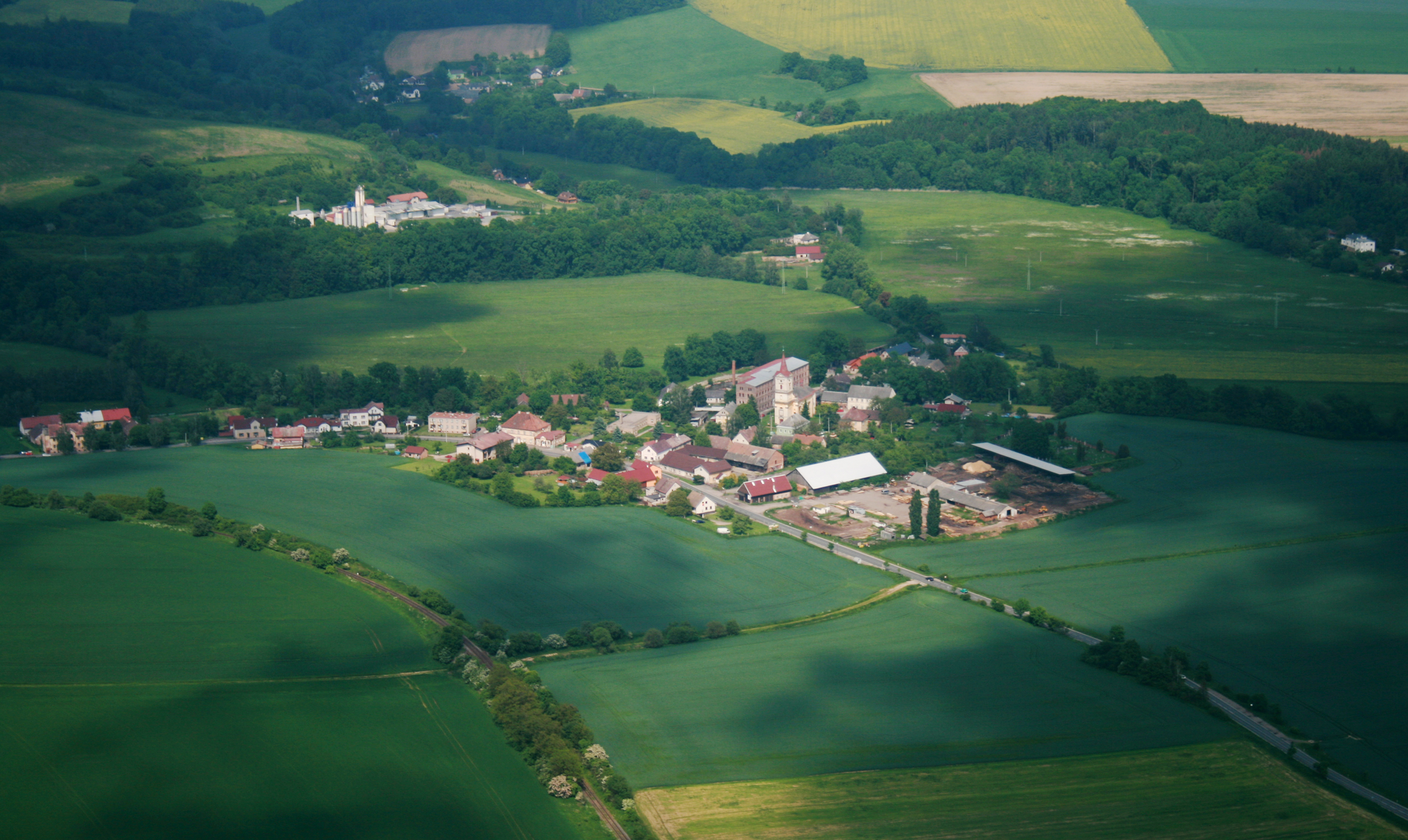
- Aerial view

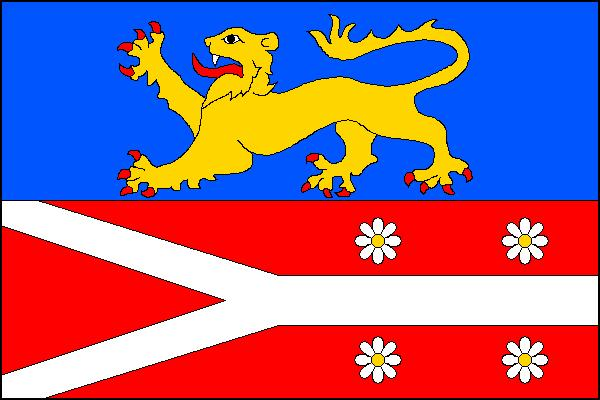
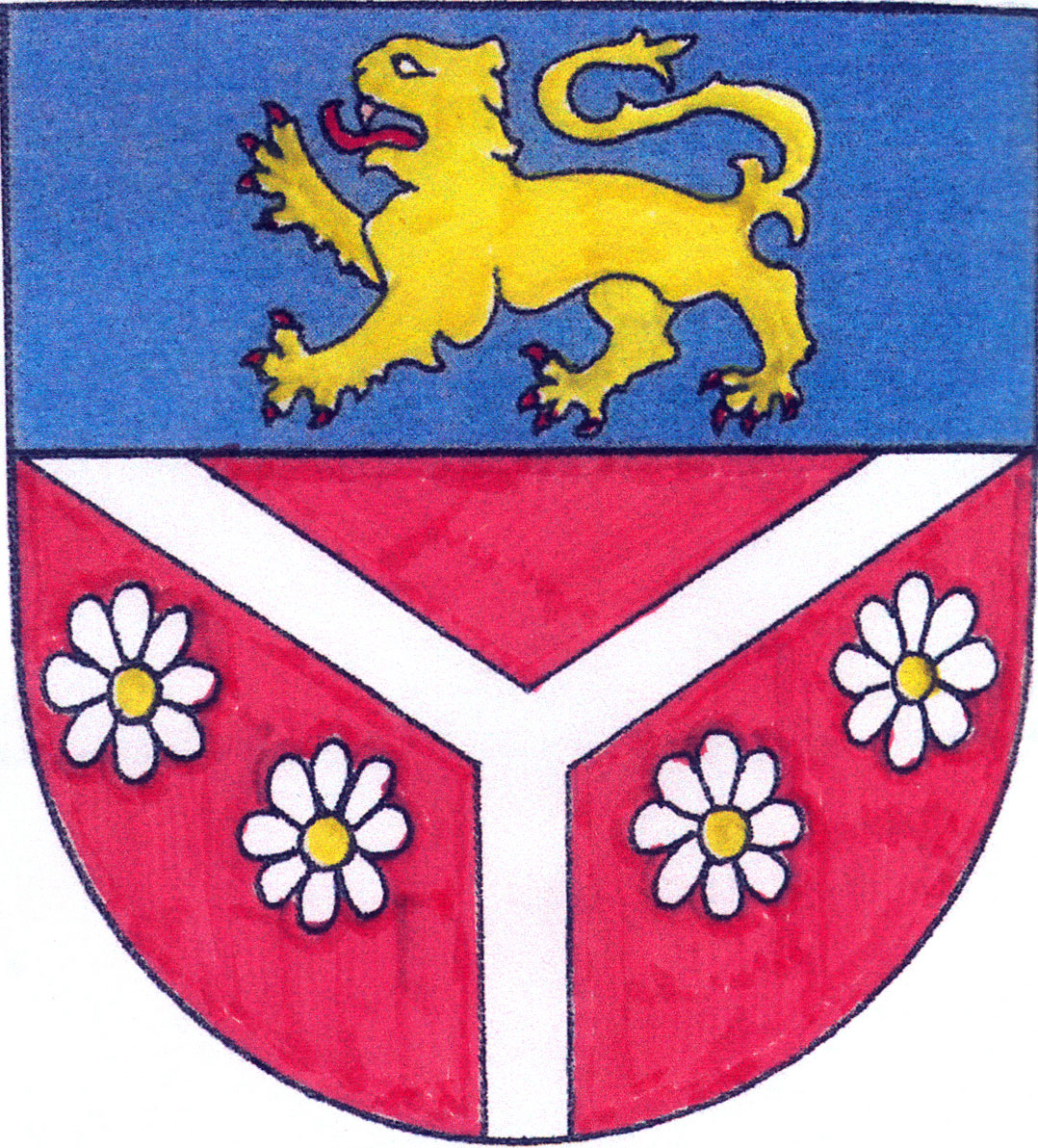
- Flag Coat of arms

- Location in the Czech Republic
- Coordinates: 50°22′47″N 15°55′7″E
- Country: Czech Republic
- Region: Hradec Králové
- District: Náchod
- First mentioned: 1352

Area
  - Total: 6.94 km^{2} (2.68 sq mi)
- Elevation: 276 m (906 ft)

Population (2026-01-01)
  - Total: 426
  - Density: 61.4/km^{2} (159/sq mi)
- Time zone: UTC+1 (CET)
  - Summer (DST): UTC+2 (CEST)
- Postal code: 552 12
- Website: www.obec-hermanice.cz

Heřmanice (German: Hermanitz) is a municipality and village in Náchod District in the Hradec Králové Region of the Czech Republic. It has about 400 inhabitants.

== Administrative division ==
Heřmanice consists of four municipal parts (in brackets population according to the 2021 census):

- Heřmanice (146)
- Běluň (60)
- Brod (106)
- Slotov (88)

== Demographics ==
Historical population
Year	Pop.	±%
1869	889	—
1880	1,013	+13.9%
1890	1,054	+4.0%
1900	1,035	−1.8%
1910	925	−10.6%
1921	984	+6.4%
1930	843	−14.3%
1950	813	−3.6%
1961	605	−25.6%
1970	474	−21.7%
1980	454	−4.2%
1991	395	−13.0%
2001	343	−13.2%
2011	388	+13.1%
2021	400	+3.1%
Source: Censuses

== Notable people ==
- Albrecht von Wallenstein (1583–1634), military leader and statesman
