= Vilém Kinský =

Bohemian noble (1574–1634)

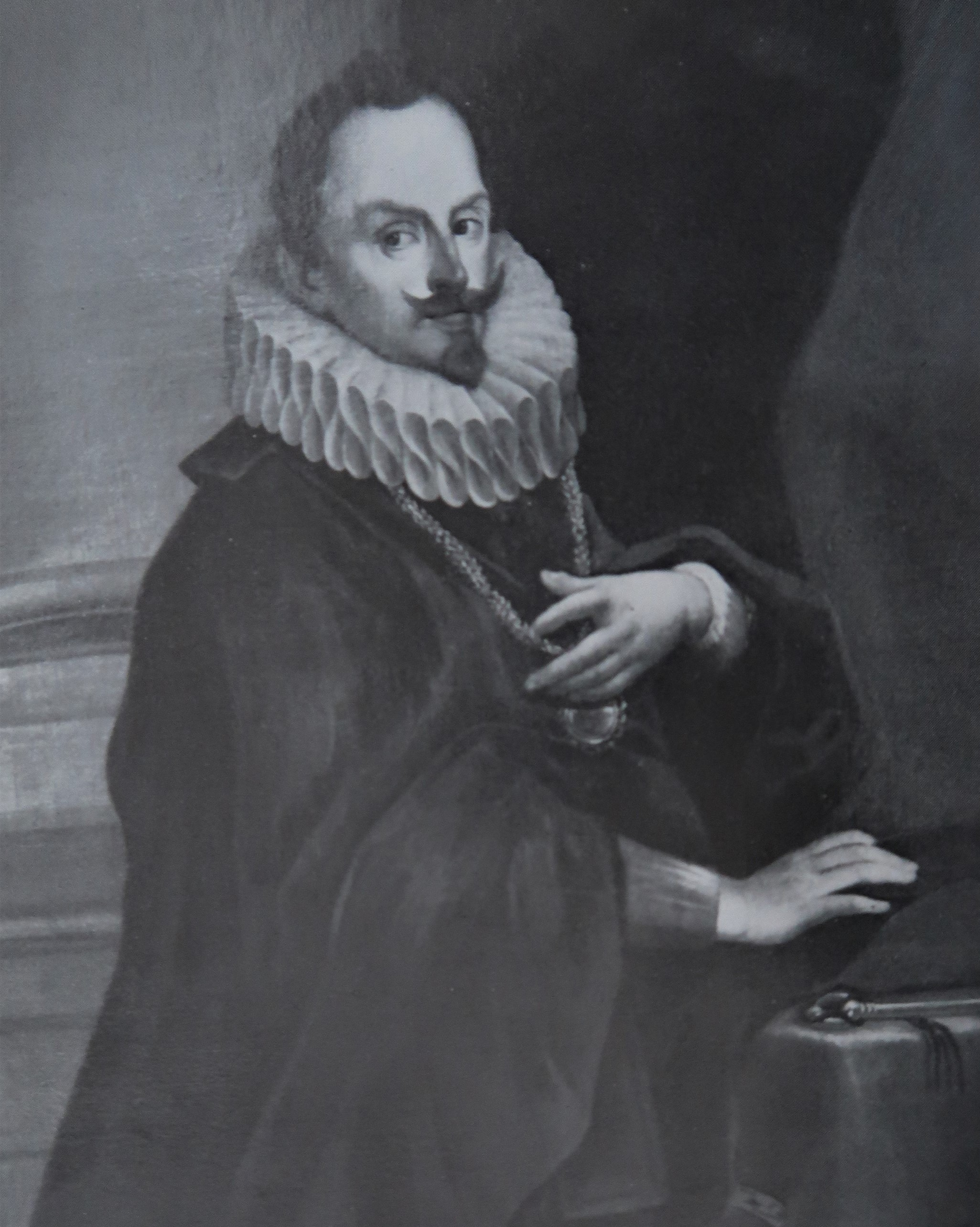
Portrait of Count Wilhelm Kinsky

Count Wilhelm Kinsky von Wchinitz (Czech: Vilém Kinský z Vchynic; German: Wilhelm Graf Kinsky von Wchinitz und Tettau; 1574 – 25 February 1634) was a landowner and a statesman. By birth, he was member of the House of Kinsky, which belonged to the highest circle of Bohemian aristocracy.

== Early life ==
Wilhelm was born as the younger son of Johann Kinsky von Wchinitz, Burggraf of Karlštejn (1540-1590) and his wife, Anna Pauzar von Michnic (d. 1598), daughter of Johann Pauzar von Michnic.

== Biography ==
In 1628, Wilhelm Kinsky was elevated to the rank of Count in the Bohemian nobility when Wallenstein was elevated to Duchy of Friedland. As a rich landowner in Bohemia, Kinsky lived in exile at Dresden after the Battle of White Mountain, because he was a Protestant and, unlike the members of the Trčka family, had refused to convert to the Catholic faith but was allowed to regularly visit his Bohemian estates. Subsequently, together with his brother-in-law Adam Erdmann Trčka, he attempted to pull Wallenstein over to the Protestant and Swedish side.

Kinsky was assassinated during the Thirty Years' War, on 25 February 1634 at Cheb, together with Trčka and other officers loyal to the general and the Field Marshal himself, during the so-called Eger Bloodbath, a plot to purge the Imperial Army from Albrecht von Wallenstein's supporters. Kinsky's estates, among them Teplice, were confiscated by Emperor Ferdinand II.

== Personal life ==
Wilhelm Kinsky married Countess Elisabeth Magdalena Trčka von Lípa, whose brother Adam Erdmann Trčka von Lípa was married with Countess Maximiliane von Harrach, a sister of Albrecht von Wallenstein's second wife. They had:

- Count Adolf Ernst Kinsky von Wchinitz (d. after 1648); married Elisabeth Killgrew. They had:
  - Count Wilhelm Leopold Kinsky von Wchinitz (d. 1709); married Franziska Rosalie Berka of Dubá. They had no issue
- Count Ulrich Kinsky von Wchinitz (d. after 1648)
- Count Philipp Moritz Kinsky von Wchinitz (d. after 1648)

== Bibliography ==
- Otto's encyclopedia at
- Wilson, Peter (2011). The Thirty Years War: Europe's Tragedy. London: Belknap Press. ISBN 978-0-674-06231-3.
- Official pages of the family Kinsky: Vilém Kinský a Albrecht Václav Eusebius z Valdštejna
- Joachim Whaley: Germany and the Holy Roman Empire:Volume I: Maximilian I to the Peace of Westphalia, 1493-1648, Oxford University Press 2011
- Hamish M. Scott: The European nobilities in the seventeenth and eighteenth centuries, Volume 2, Longman, 1995
