= Duchy of Friedland =

Duchy

Coordinates: 50°26′N 15°21′E

Wallenstein's coat of arms as Duke of Friedland.

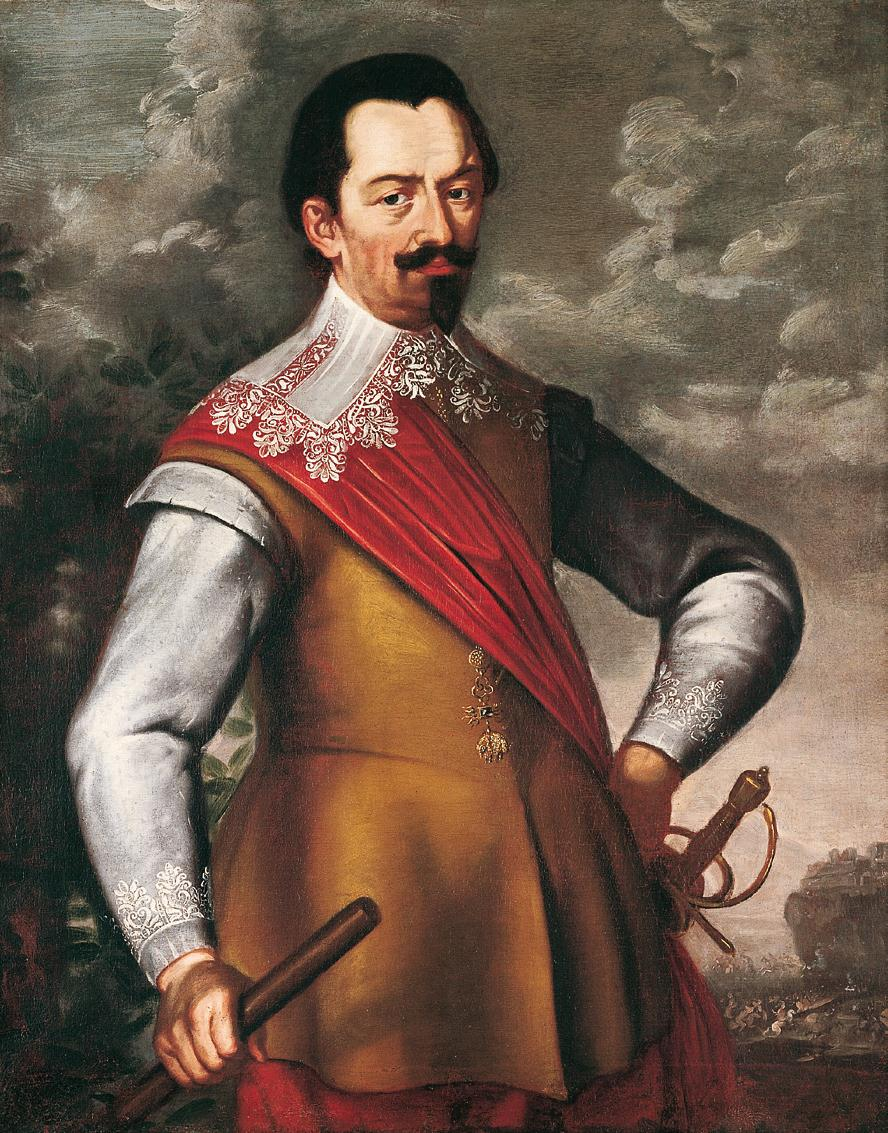
Generalissimus Albrecht von Wallenstein

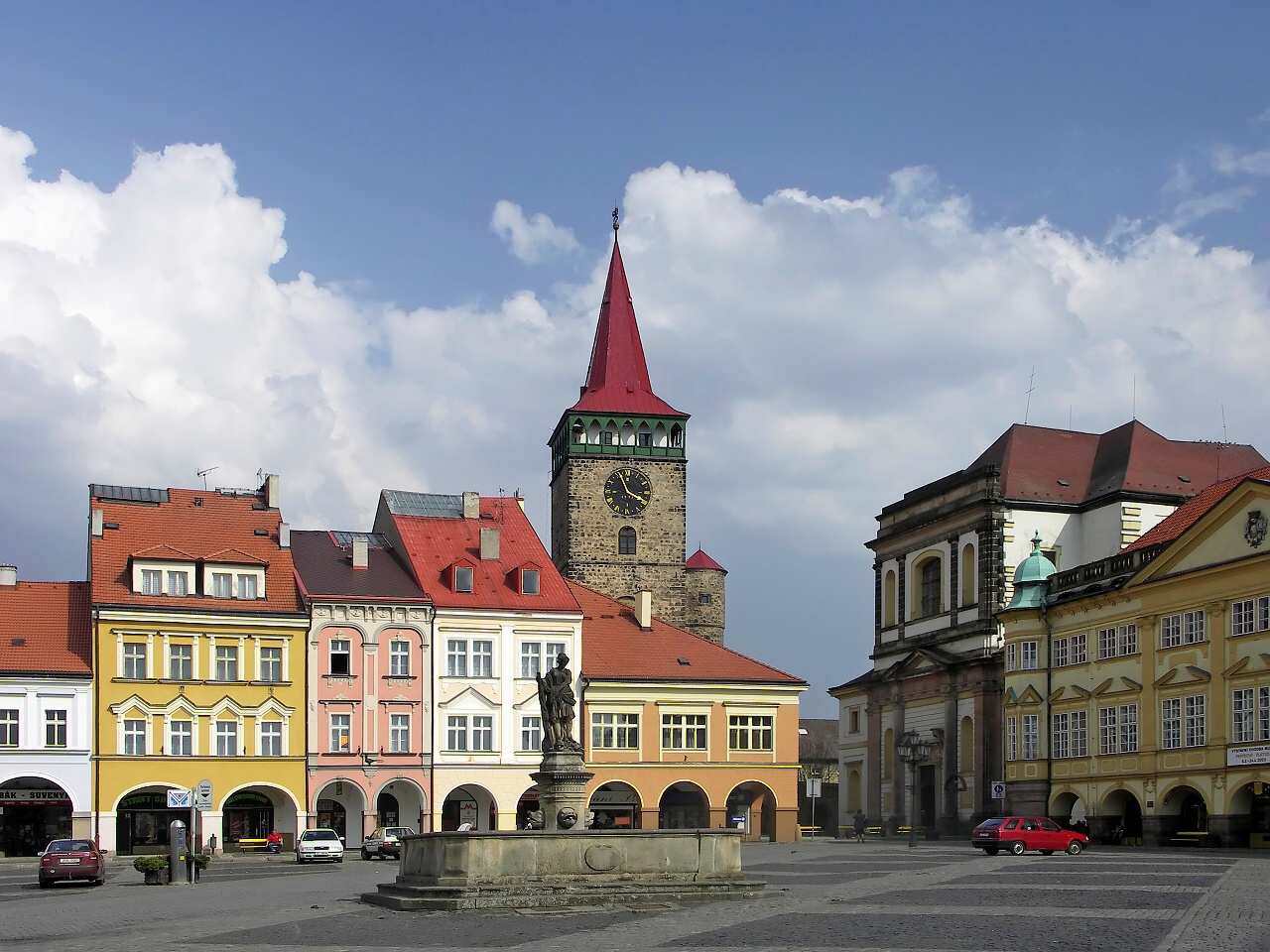
Jičín, Wallenstein's square - toward the right is the unfinished bishop's church and the rightmost building is the front part of ducal palace, rebuilt after Wallenstein's death

Duchy of Friedland (Czech: Frýdlantské vévodství, German: Herzogtum Friedland) was a de facto sovereign duchy in Bohemia. It was created in 1627 and disappeared in 1634 after death of the ruler Albrecht von Wallenstein (1582 - 1634). It was preceded by the Principality of Friedland (Czech: Frýdlantské knížectví, German: Fürstentum Friedland), which existed from 1624 to 1627.

== History ==
Establishment of the principality then the duchy followed the rise to power of Albrecht von Wallenstein, a military leader in the service of the House of Habsburg during the Thirty Years' War.

In August 1622, Wallenstein was granted titles of Count Palatine (falckrabě, Pfalzgraf) and Imperial Count (hrabě, Graf). A predicate "of Friedland" (z Frýdlantu, von Friedland), granted after the northern Bohemian town Frýdlant (Friedland) was acquired by Wallenstein in 1621, together with the whole Friedland dominion (panství, Herschaft). On 7 September 1623, he was given title of Imperial Duke. At this time, he owned 49 dominions in eastern and northern part of Bohemia, which grew in 1624 to 64, and on 12 March 1624, Emperor Ferdinand II declared the area as Principality of Friedland. Because of ducal title, the Principality was elevated to Duchy on 4 January 1627.

The new duchy was de facto independent from the rest of Bohemia. Wallenstein had started an ambitious reconstruction of Jičín, capital of the duchy. He planned to set up bishopric, university, and a diet. In 1628, he obtained the right to mint its own coins and the rights to grant nobility titles and township privileges.

Preparation for the new university included invitation of Jesuits to Jičín where they established a Jesuit college. Wallenstein initiated building of a large early-Baroque church as a seat of the bishop (the building was never finished though but serves until today as the main church in the town). Next to the church, the ducal palace was built. Area of the town had doubled during this period. Near Jičín, a large park was established - remains of which survive through current day.

Throughout the duchy, Wallenstein's financier Hans de Witte set up and controlled silver, copper, and lead mines, iron forges, armament factories, and river Labe transportation system, all geared up to supply warlord's forces.

After Wallenstein's death in 1634, most of the duchy was given to Count Matthias Gallas and its independent status was annulled.

== Literature ==
English:

- Golo Mann: Wallenstein, his life narrated, 1976, Holt, Rinehart and Winston, ISBN 0-03-091884-7.

Czech:

- Jan Morávek, Zdeněk Wirth: Waldštejnův Jičín (Waldstein's Jičín), Prague, 1946.
- Zdeněk Hojda: Albrecht Václav Eusebius z Valdštejna, mezníky života (Albrecht Wenceslas Eusebius of Waldstein - the milestones of his life), in: Mojmír Horyna et al.: Valdštejnský palác, 2002, ISBN 80-86087-35-2.

German:

- Anton Ernstberger: Wallenstein als Volkswirt im Herzogtum Friedland (Wallenstein as an economist in the Duchy of Friedland), Reichenberg i.B. Kraus. 1929. VI, 148 S. : Kt.. Prager Studien aus dem Gebiete der Geschichtswissenschaft; 19. (See list of literature for publications about Wallenstein in German.)
