= Rymice =

- Municipality
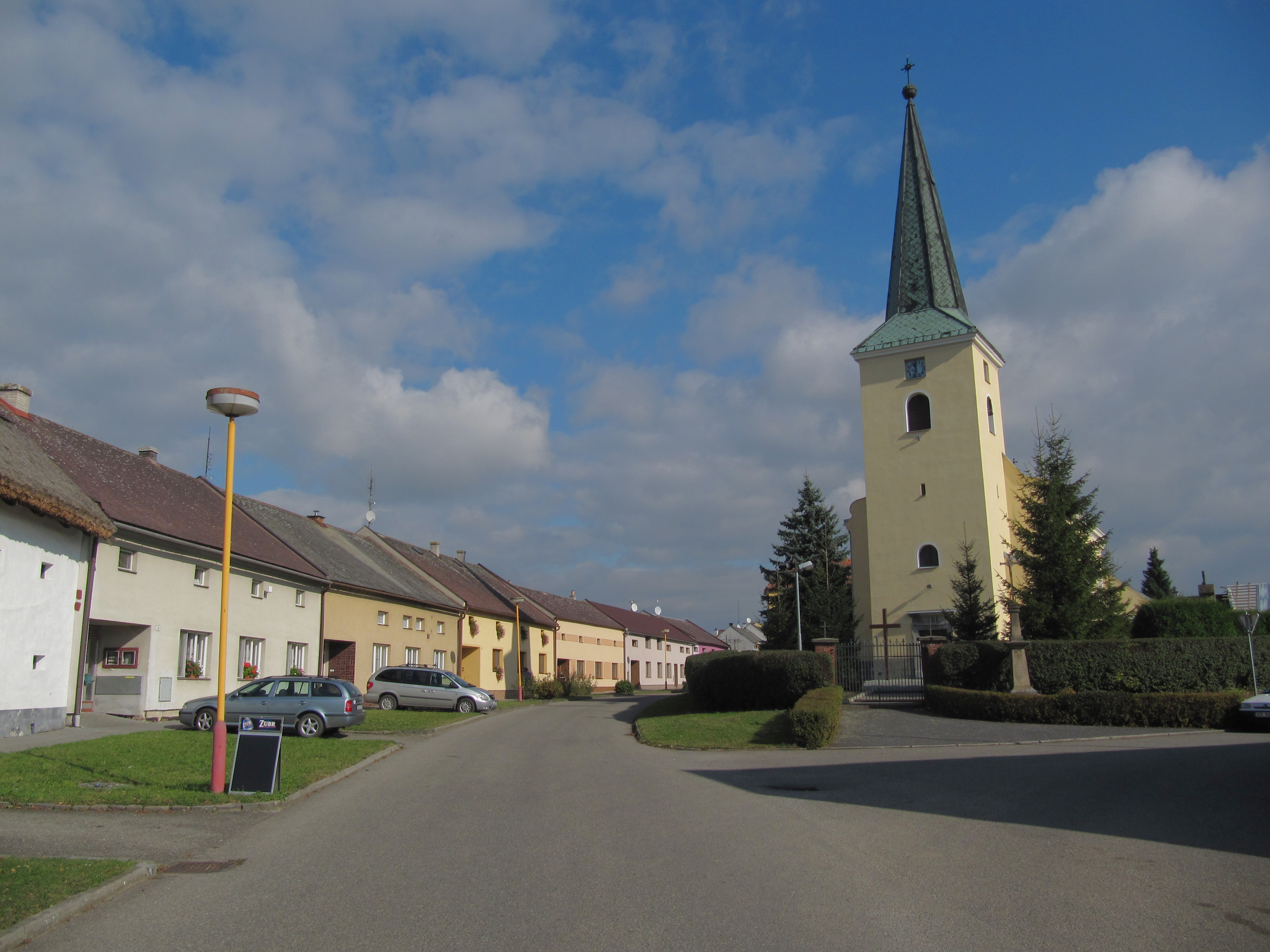
- Church of Saint Bartholomew

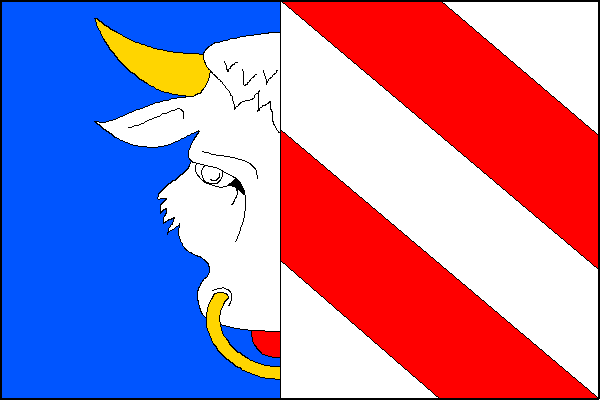
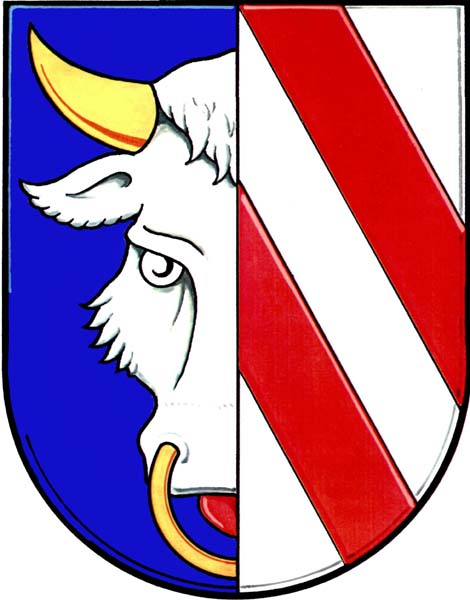
- Flag Coat of arms

- Location in the Czech Republic
- Coordinates: 49°20′31″N 17°31′34″E
- Country: Czech Republic
- Region: Zlín
- District: Kroměříž
- First mentioned: 1353

Area
  - Total: 5.52 km^{2} (2.13 sq mi)
- Elevation: 210 m (690 ft)

Population (2026-01-01)
  - Total: 596
  - Density: 108/km^{2} (280/sq mi)
- Time zone: UTC+1 (CET)
  - Summer (DST): UTC+2 (CEST)
- Postal code: 769 01
- Website: www.rymice.cz

Rymice is a municipality and village in Kroměříž District in the Zlín Region of the Czech Republic. It has about 600 inhabitants.

Rymice lies approximately 11 kilometres (7 mi) north-east of Kroměříž, 17 km (11 mi) north-west of Zlín, and 239 km (149 mi) east of Prague.

== Demographics ==
Historical population
Year	Pop.	±%
1869	609	—
1880	655	+7.6%
1890	707	+7.9%
1900	768	+8.6%
1910	782	+1.8%
1921	735	−6.0%
1930	721	−1.9%
1950	663	−8.0%
1961	667	+0.6%
1970	637	−4.5%
1980	586	−8.0%
1991	521	−11.1%
2001	550	+5.6%
2011	593	+7.8%
2021	569	−4.0%
Source: Censuses
