= Karl von Harrach =

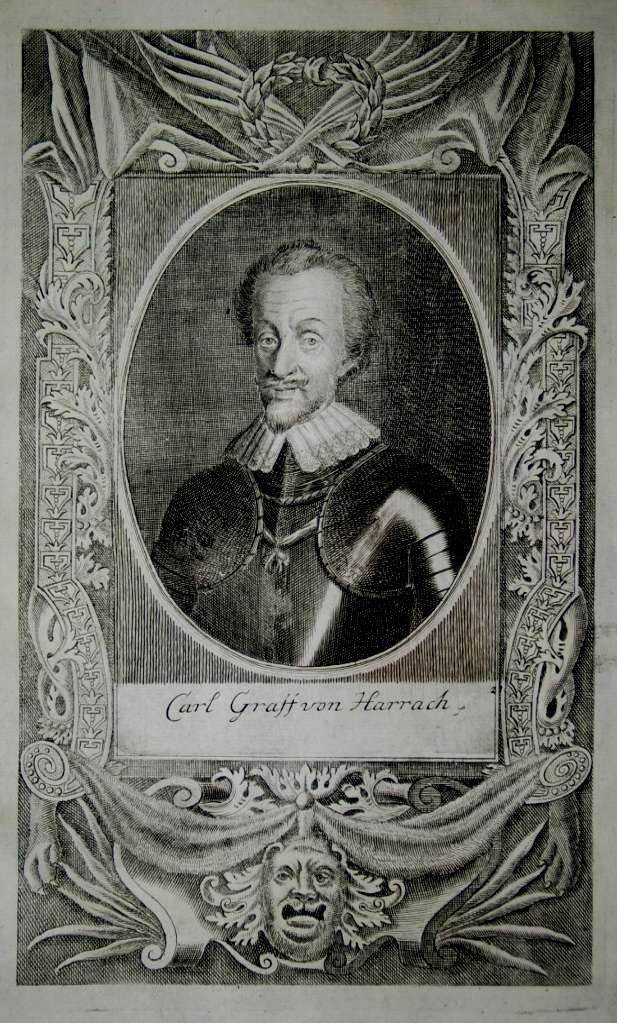
- Engraving of Count Karl von Harrach

Member of the Geheimrat (Privy Council)
- In office 1620–1628

Personal details
- Born: Karl von Harrach; 1570
- Died: 16 May 1628 (aged 57–58) Prague, Bohemia, Holy Roman Empire
- Resting place: Vienna, Austria
- Spouse: Maria Elisabeth Freiin von Schrattenbach
- Children: Ernst Adalbert von Harrach
- Parents: Leonhard IV, Count von Harrach (father); Maria Jacobea of Hohenzollern-Sigmaringen (mother)
- Occupation: Diplomat
- Awards: Order of the Golden Fleece

Karl von Harrach (1570 – 16 May 1628) was a nobleman, statesman, and diplomat in the Holy Roman Empire. Over the course of his career, he became involved in the internal power struggle over the Holy Roman crown. In 1627, he received the Spanish version of the Order of the Golden Fleece.

== Biography ==
Born in 1570 into illustrious House of Harrach, Karl was the second child of Leonhard IV, Count von Harrach (1542-1597) and his wife, Countess Maria Jacobea of Hohenzollern-Sigmaringen (1549-1578). In 1590, he bore the Austrian flag at the funeral of Archduke Charles II. He served as the chamberlain of Archduke Ernest of Austria. On 11 August 1595, he was appointed by Emperor Rudolf II to Lower Austrian Regimentsrat.

At the time of an internal power struggle between Rudolf and his brothers, he used his position in the Imperial Court to supply Ferdinand II, who was residing in Graz, with information about the other pretenders to the Imperial crown. In 1601, he was appointed to the position of Imperial chamberlain. In 1608, he played an instrumental role in Matthias's seizure of the titles of Archduke of Austria, King of Croatia, and King of Hungary. From 1614 until 1617, he served as an imperial ambassador in various states within the empire. On 26 September 1617, he became the cosignatory of the Treaty of Madrid (1617) along with Venetian ambassadors Giustiniani and Contarini, the treaty officially ended the Uskok War between the two states. In 1620, he was sent as an Imperial envoy to the court of Maximilian I, Elector of Bavaria. He then became a member of emperor Ferdinand's Geheimrat (Privy Council), he joined the "Spanish faction" of the council, centered around Hans Ulrich von Eggenberg

In January 1625, his castle Schloss Prugg in Bruck an der Leitha was exempt from provincial taxation. On 25 August, he was granted the right to establish a private mint, which he operated together with the House of Liechtenstein. In 1627, Philip IV of Spain awarded him the Order of the Golden Fleece.

== Family ==
His marriage to Maria Elisabeth Freiin von Schrattenbach (1563-1653), the daughter of Baron Maximilian von Schrattenbach, Lord of Heggenberg (1537-1611) and his wife, Anna von Grasswein (d. 1621). The marriage produced 6 sons and 3 daughters:

- His sons Johann Karl and Max served in the Imperial army and were killed in action during the course of the Thirty Years' War, dying unmarried.
- Ernst Adalbert (born 1598) became the Archbishop of Prague, heading the recatholicization in Bohemia.
- Franz Albrecht served as a diplomat, his marriage to Baroness Anna Magdalena Jörger von Tollet produced no children.
- Leonhard and Otto Friedrich were the founders of two lines of succession.
- His eldest daughter was married to Count Max von Waldstein-Wartenberg, a distant cousin of Albrecht von Wallenstein.
- His two younger daughters Elisabeth and Maximiliana were married to Imperial Generalissimo Albrecht von Wallenstein and his comrade Adam Erdmann Trčka von Lípa respectively.

== Death ==
On 16 May 1628, Harrach died in Prague. His body was transported to the Harrach family mausoleum located in the Augustinian Church, Vienna. Harrach's passing and Eggenberg's resignation negatively influenced Wallenstein's popularity within the Imperial court, facilitating an internal purge orchestrated by the general's opponents and endorsed by the Emperor. Wallenstein and Trčka were assassinated, along with other officers, during the purge's culmination in the so-called Eger Bloodbath.
