= Kytlice =

- Municipality
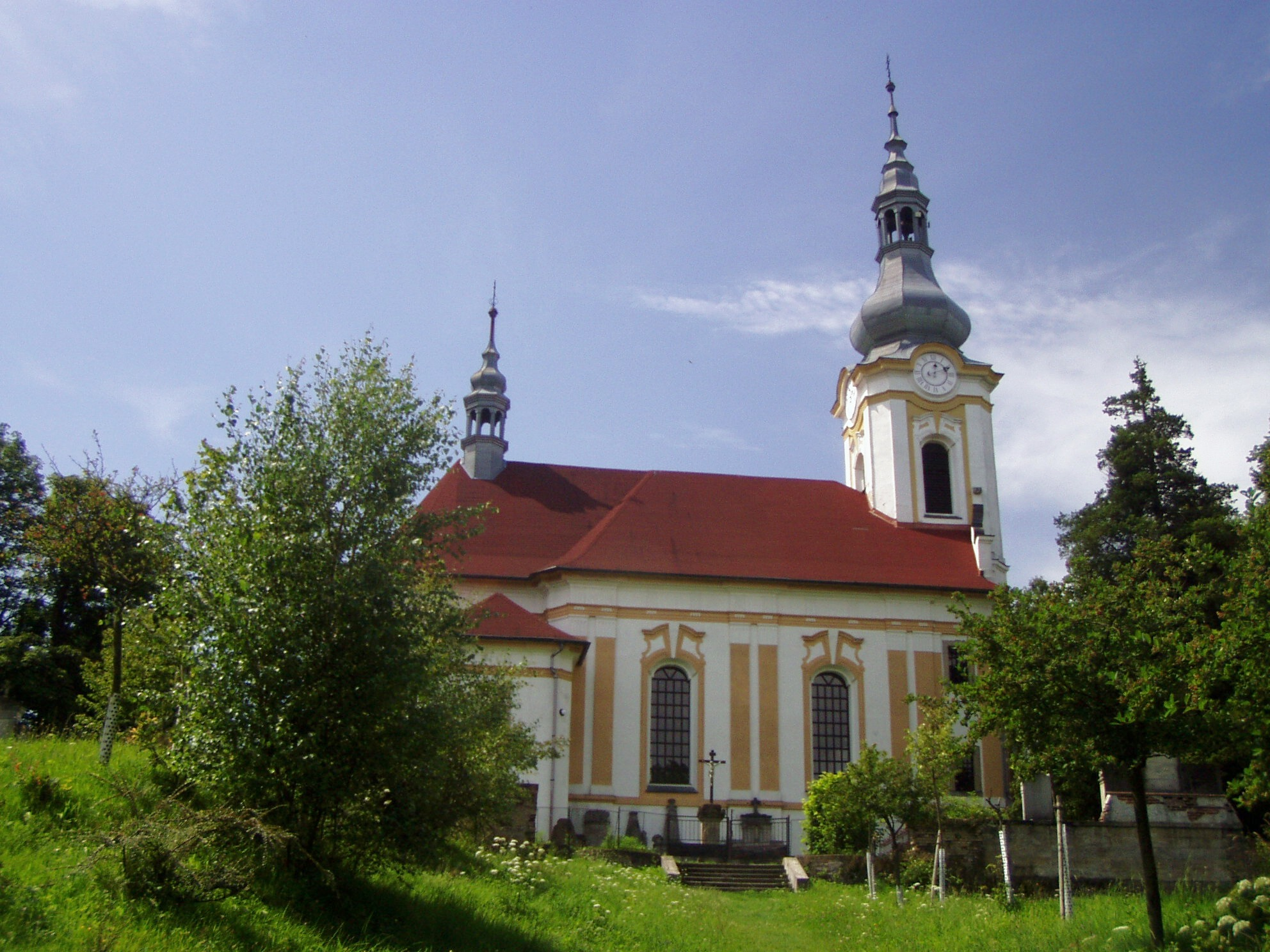
- Church of Saint Anthony of Padua

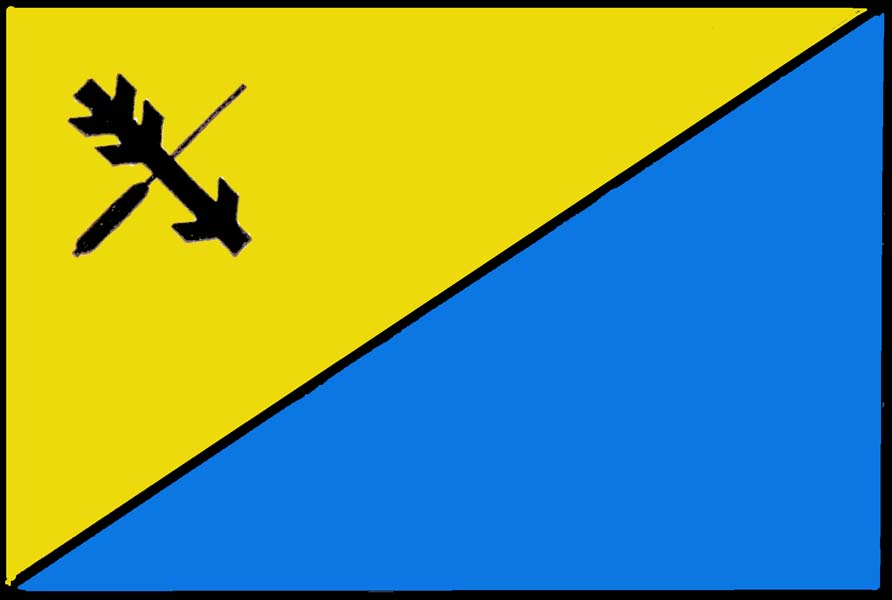
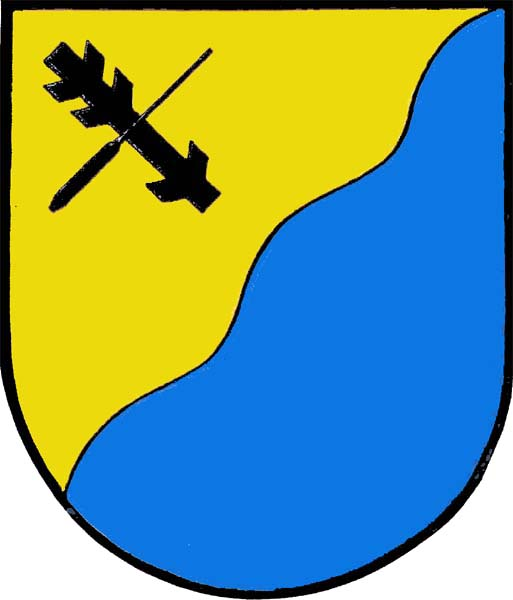
- Flag Coat of arms

- Location in the Czech Republic
- Coordinates: 50°48′46″N 14°32′8″E
- Country: Czech Republic
- Region: Ústí nad Labem
- District: Děčín
- First mentioned: 1787

Area
  - Total: 26.76 km^{2} (10.33 sq mi)
- Elevation: 462 m (1,516 ft)

Population (2026-01-01)
  - Total: 478
  - Density: 17.9/km^{2} (46.3/sq mi)
- Time zone: UTC+1 (CET)
  - Summer (DST): UTC+2 (CEST)
- Postal code: 407 45
- Website: www.obec-kytlice.cz

Kytlice (German: Kittlitz) is a municipality and village in Děčín District in the Ústí nad Labem Region of the Czech Republic. It has about 500 inhabitants.

Kytlice lies approximately 25 kilometres (16 mi) east of Děčín, 38 km (24 mi) north-east of Ústí nad Labem, and 80 km (50 mi) north of Prague.

== Administrative division ==
Kytlice consists of five municipal parts (in brackets population according to the 2021 census):

- Kytlice (186)
- Dolní Falknov (103)
- Falknov (76)
- Hillův Mlýn (35)
- Mlýny (85)

== Demographics ==
Historical population
| Year | Pop. | ±% |
|---|---|---|
| 1869 | 2,478 | — |
| 1880 | 2,500 | +0.9% |
| 1890 | 2,492 | −0.3% |
| 1900 | 2,912 | +16.9% |
| 1910 | 2,966 | +1.9% |
| 1921 | 2,537 | −14.5% |
| 1930 | 2,520 | −0.7% |
| 1950 | 711 | −71.8% |
| 1961 | 631 | −11.3% |
| 1970 | 614 | −2.7% |
| 1980 | 521 | −15.1% |
| 1991 | 365 | −29.9% |
| 2001 | 418 | +14.5% |
| 2011 | 497 | +18.9% |
| 2021 | 485 | −2.4% |
Source: Censuses

== Notable people ==
- Franz Xaver Zippe (1791–1863), natural philosopher and mineralogist
