= Treaty of Hamburg (1638) =

1638 treaty between France and Sweden

The Treaty of Hamburg, signed on 5 March 1638 (to "l'echange des ratifications du Traite conclu a Wismar le 20 Mars 1636), was the ratification of the important Treaty of Wismar a full two years after it had been negotiated by Cardinal Richelieu of France and representatives of Queen Christina of Sweden. As it provided the Swedes with crucial funds to go on the offensive again, it was a major turning point of the Thirty Years' War.

In 1634 the Swedes/Protestants had suffered a crushing defeat at Nördlingen and it was clear to the French that they had to be much more active or Ferdinand II, Holy Roman Emperor would win the war. The half-hearted Treaty of Compiègne in April 1635 was a first attempt to support the Swedes but after their most powerful former ally Saxony had changed sides in the Peace of Prague in May and the dissolution of the Protestant Heilbronn League which had provided the greatest share of Swedish finance the Protestant cause looked desperate. Swedish chancellor Axel Oxenstierna at the time was open to a financial offer by the Emperor but that never materialized. Also in May 1635 the French war with Spanish Habsburg broke out. In October, the highly regarded Protestant Bernard of Saxe-Weimar and his formerly Swedish mercenary army were taken into French service, so basically cash-strapped Sweden had to hold on to Northern Germany only with a hand full of Northern allies. The victory at Wittstock in Brandenburg in October 1636, two years after Nördlingen, proved that Sweden was still a player but before the treaty of Hamburg Johan Banér was chased from Saxony to Pommern by Matthias Gallas in 1637.

Based on the terms of the treaty, France paid Sweden 1,000,000 livres for its military contributions against the Habsburgs. Moreover, the accord confirmed their alliance set by the tenets of the Treaty of Wismar which had been negotiated in March 1636.

== See also ==
- Treaty of Bärwalde

== Related reading ==
- Parker, Geoffrey; Adams, Simon (1997) The Thirty Years' War (Routledge. 2 ed.) ISBN 0415128838
- Smith, Helmut Walser (2020). Germany: A Nation in Its Time: Before, During, and After Nationalism, 1500-2000 (First ed.). New York, NY: W.W. Norton. ISBN 978-0-87140-466-4.
- Tryntje Helfferich, translator (2009) The Thirty Years War: A Documentary History (Hackett Publishing Company, Inc.) ISBN 978-0872209398
