= Thirty Years' War =

Major war in Central Europe (1618–1648)

- Part of the European wars of religion and French–Habsburg rivalry
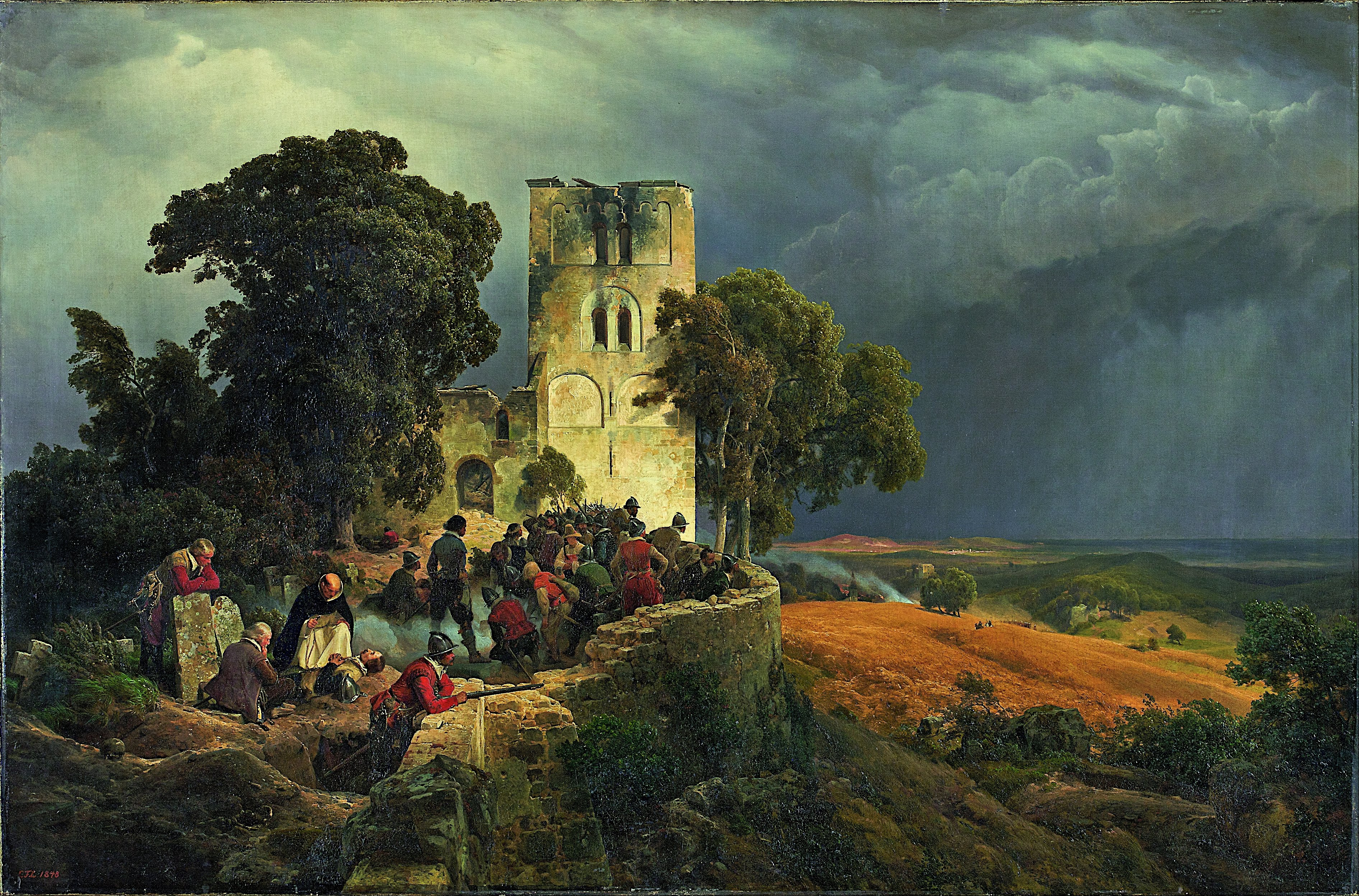
- The Siege (Defence of a Church Courtyard During the Thirty Years' War); Karl Friedrich Lessing, 1848
Date	23 May 1618 – 24 October 1648
Location	Central Europe
Result	Peace of Westphalia
Territorial changes	France annexes the Décapole, and Sundgau; Sweden gains Wismar, Wolin, Western Pomerania, and Bremen-Verden; Brandenburg-Prussia obtains Eastern Pomerania

Belligerents
Anti-Habsburg alliance prior to 1635 (Note: States that fought against the emperor at some point between 1618 and 1635.): (Kingdom of Bohemia) Bohemia; Swedish Empire; Palatinate; (Duchy of Savoy) Savoy; Dutch Republic; Denmark–Norway; Heilbronn League; Hesse-Kassel; Brandenburg-Prussia; Saxony	Pro-Habsburg alliance prior to 1635: Habsburg Monarchy; (Spain) Spanish Empire; Bavaria; Catholic League
Post-1635 Peace of Prague: France; Swedish Empire; Dutch Republic; Hesse-Kassel	Post-1635 Peace of Prague: Holy Roman Empire; (Spain) Spanish Empire; Bavaria

Commanders and leaders
(Swedish Empire) Gustavus Adolphus †; (Swedish Empire) Axel Oxenstierna; (Swedish Empire) Johan Banér; (Swedish Empire) Lennart Torstensson; (Swedish Empire) Carl Gustaf Wrangel; (Swedish Empire) Bernard of Saxe-Weimar; (Swedish Empire) Gustav Horn; (Kingdom of France) Louis XIII; (Kingdom of France) Cardinal Richelieu; (Kingdom of France) Cardinal Mazarin; (Kingdom of France) Condé; (Kingdom of France) Henri Turenne; (Dutch Republic) Frederick Henry; (Dutch Republic) Maurice of Orange; (Bohemia) Frederick V; Christian II; (Bohemia) Jindřich Thurn; (Bohemia) Mansfeld; (Bohemia) Christian I; (Denmark–Norway) Christian IV; (Electorate of Saxony) John George I; (Transylvania) Gabriel Bethlen	(Holy Roman Empire) Ferdinand II; (Holy Roman Empire) Ferdinand III; (Holy Roman Empire) Wallenstein; (Holy Roman Empire) Matthias Gallas; (Holy Roman Empire) Archduke Leopold; (Holy Roman Empire) Melchior von Hatzfeldt; (Holy Roman Empire) von Holzappel †; (Holy Roman Empire) Ottavio Piccolomini; Count Tilly †; (Holy Roman Empire) Pappenheim †; (Holy Roman Empire) Charles of Lorraine; (Holy Roman Empire) Montecuccoli; (Spain) Philip IV; (Spain) Olivares; (Spain) Córdoba; (Spain) Ambrogio Spinola; (Spain) Cardinal-Infante Ferdinand; (Electorate of Bavaria) Maximilian I; (Electorate of Bavaria) Franz von Mercy †; (Electorate of Bavaria) Johann von Werth

Strength
Maximum actual: (Note: Since officers were paid for each man "present", the numbers Reported frequently differed from Actual, or those available for duty. Variances between Reported and Actual are estimated as averaging up to 25% for the Dutch, 35% for the French and 50% for the Spanish. Most battles of the period were fought between opposing forces of 13,000 to 20,000 men, so the numbers reflect Maximum at any one time, and exclude citizen militia, who often formed a large proportion of garrisons.) (Note: These figures show numbers "In Service of", rather than ethnicity, since all armies were multinational. Most soldiers on both sides were German, but included large numbers of other nationalities. Based on an analysis of a mass grave discovered in 2011, a high proportion of "Swedish" forces at Lützen were ethnic Germans, while less than 50% even came from Scandinavia.): 100,000–140,000 Swedish; 27,000 Danes (1626); 70,000–80,000 French; 80,000–90,000 Dutch	Maximum actual: 110,000 Imperial; 88,280 Spanish (Note: 1640 figures for the Army of Flanders, when it was at its maximum strength; these are reported numbers, so as mentioned elsewhere, the actual number of soldiers would have been considerably lower. The Spanish army officially had more than 200,000 soldiers in 1640, but most were second line troops in garrisons elsewhere in Europe, not facing the Dutch.); 20,500 Bavarians

Casualties and losses
Combat deaths: (Note: Wilson estimates a total of 450,000 combat deaths on all sides, the vast majority of whom were German. By one calculation, four times as many Germans died fighting for Sweden as Swedes, and so casualties are referred to as being "In service", rather than by nationality.); 110,000 in Swedish service 80,000 in French service (Note: France lost another 200,000 to 300,000 killed or wounded in the related Franco-Spanish War.)	Combat deaths: 120,000 in Imperial service
- Total military deaths: 1,300,000 to 1,800,000; Total civilian and military deaths: 4,500,000 to 8,000,000 (Note: Includes military losses from disease, which Wilson estimates as two to three for every one killed in combat.)

The Thirty Years' War, (Note: German: Dreißigjähriger Krieg, pronounced [ˈdʁaɪ̯sɪçˌjɛːʁɪɡɐ kʁiːk]) fought primarily in Central Europe between 1618 and 1648, was one of the most destructive conflicts in European history. An estimated 4.5 to 8 million soldiers and civilians died from the effects of battle, famine, or disease, with parts of Germany reporting population declines of more than 50%. Related conflicts include the Eighty Years' War, the War of the Mantuan Succession, the Franco–Spanish War, the Torstenson War, and Portuguese Restoration War.

Its causes derived from religious conflict within the Holy Roman Empire, sparked by the 16th-century Reformation. The 1555 Peace of Augsburg attempted to resolve this by dividing the empire into Catholic and Lutheran states, but was later destabilised by the expansion of Protestantism beyond these boundaries. Combined with disagreements over the limits of imperial authority, religion was thus an important factor in starting the war. However, its scope and extent were largely the consequence of external drivers such as the French–Habsburg rivalry and the Dutch Revolt.

The war began in 1618, (Note: Some commentators argue it began with the War of the Jülich Succession in 1609.) when the Catholic Emperor Ferdinand II was replaced as king of Bohemia by the Protestant Frederick V of the Palatinate. Although Frederick was swiftly deposed, his participation meant fighting expanded into the Palatinate. Their strategic importance drew in the Dutch Republic and the Spanish Empire, then engaged in the Eighty Years' War, while the acquisition of imperial territories gave rulers like Christian IV of Denmark and Gustavus Adolphus of Sweden incentives to intervene. These factors, together with fears the Protestant religion itself was under threat, transformed an internal dynastic dispute into a wider conflict.

The period from 1618 to 1635 was primarily a civil war within the Holy Roman Empire, which largely ended with the Peace of Prague. However, France's entry into the war in alliance with Sweden turned the empire into one theatre of a wider struggle with their Habsburg rivals, Emperor Ferdinand III and Spain. Fighting ended with the 1648 Peace of Westphalia, whose terms included greater autonomy for states like Bavaria and Saxony, Swedish territorial gains in northern Germany, as well as Spain's acceptance of Dutch independence.

== Structural origins ==
The 16th-century Reformation led to the Schmalkaldic War between Protestants and Catholics within the Holy Roman Empire. Fighting ended with the 1552 Peace of Passau, followed by the 1555 Peace of Augsburg, which tried to prevent a recurrence by fixing boundaries between the two faiths. Under the principle of cuius regio, eius religio, states were designated as either Lutheran, then the most usual form of Protestantism, or Catholic, based on the religion of their ruler. Other provisions protected substantial religious minorities in cities like Donauwörth, and confirmed Lutheran ownership of property taken from the Catholic Church since 1552. (Note: One major impact of the Reformation was to transfer property from the Catholic Church to secular, Protestant rulers.)

However, the settlement was undermined by the expansion of Protestantism into Catholic areas post-1555, particularly Calvinism, a Protestant doctrine viewed with hostility by both Lutherans and Catholics. It also gave individual states greater freedom to pursue their own objectives, which often clashed with those of central authority or local rivals. Disputes over money and territory superseded religion, with the Protestant states of Saxony and Brandenburg competing with Denmark–Norway and Sweden for the lucrative Baltic trade. (Note: The acquisition of territories within the Empire by Denmark-Norway and Sweden gave them an ongoing opportunity to intervene in imperial affairs.)

Managing tensions was hampered by fragmented political institutions, with 300 imperial estates distributed across Germany, the Low Countries, northern Italy, and France. (Note: Although technically there were nearly 1,800 separate estates, only 300 were represented in the Imperial Diet or Circles. Most of the remaining 1,500 were imperial Knights, or individual members of the lower nobility, who were excluded.) These ranged in size and importance from the seven Prince-electors who voted for the Holy Roman Emperor, down to Prince-bishoprics and imperial cities like Hamburg. (Note: Its official title remains Freie und Hansestadt Hamburg) Each also belonged to a separate regional grouping known as an Imperial Circle, which was chiefly concerned with defence, and operated independently. Above all of these was the Imperial Diet, which assembled infrequently, and focused on discussion, rather than legislation.

Since 1440, the position of emperor had been held by the House of Habsburg, the largest single landowner within the Holy Roman Empire. They directly ruled over eight million subjects and territories that included Austria, Bohemia and Hungary. The Habsburgs also controlled the Spanish Empire until 1556, when Charles V divided his possessions between different branches of the family. This bond was reinforced by frequent inter-marriage, while Spain retained territories within the Holy Roman Empire such as the Spanish Netherlands, Milan and Franche-Comté.

Though the Spanish and Austrian branches often collaborated, they did not generally coordinate their policies because the two entities were very different. Spain was a global maritime superpower, stretching from Europe to the Philippines and the Americas, while Austria (Note: The lands ruled by the Austrian Habsburgs were often collectively known as "Austria".) was a land-based power, focused on Germany and securing its eastern border against the Ottoman Empire. Another key difference was the disparity in relative financial strength, with the Spanish Habsburgs providing large subsidies to their Austrian counterparts. The loss of these post-1640, as Spain itself struggled with the costs of a long running global war, substantially weakened the imperial position.

Prior to the Reformation, shared religion partially compensated for weak imperial institutions. After 1556, rising religious and political tensions allowed states like Lutheran Saxony and Catholic Bavaria to expand their own power, while further weakening imperial authority. This internal political struggle was exacerbated by external powers with their own strategic objectives, such as Spain, the Dutch Republic, or France, confronted by Habsburg lands on its borders to the north, south, and along the Pyrenees. Since a number of foreign rulers were also imperial princes, divisions within the empire drew in players like Christian IV of Denmark, who joined the war in 1625 as Duke of Holstein-Gottorp.

== Background: 1556 to 1618 ==
Major developments in the Thirty Years' War

Disputes occasionally resulted in full-scale conflict like the 1583 to 1588 Cologne War, triggered when its ruler converted to Calvinism. More common were localised riots such as the 1606 Battle of the Flags in Donauwörth, caused when the Lutheran majority blocked a Catholic religious procession. Emperor Rudolf allowed Maximilian of Bavaria, a Catholic, to annex the town, changing the official religion as agreed at Augsburg.

When the Imperial Diet opened in February 1608, both Lutherans and Calvinists sought re-confirmation of the Augsburg settlement. In return, the Habsburg heir Archduke Ferdinand required the immediate restoration of any property taken from the Catholic Church since 1555, as opposed to the previous practice whereby each case was assessed separately. By threatening all Protestants, his demand paralysed the Diet, and removed the perception of imperial neutrality.

Many towns and rulers responded by strengthening their military defences, as noted by foreign travellers. When Frederick IV, Elector Palatine formed the Protestant Union in 1608, Maximilian established the rival Catholic League in July 1609. Both were largely vehicles for their leaders' dynastic ambitions, but combined with the 1609 to 1614 War of the Jülich Succession, tensions increased throughout the empire.

The Spanish Road Purple: Spanish dependencies Green: Ruled by Austria Orange: Ruled by Spain

What started as an internal dynastic dispute drew in external powers due to the imminent expiry of the 1609 Twelve Years' Truce, which suspended the Eighty Years' War between Spain and the Dutch Republic. Before restarting hostilities, Ambrosio Spinola, commander in the Spanish Netherlands, needed to secure the Spanish Road, an overland route connecting Habsburg possessions in Italy to Flanders. This allowed them to transport troops and supplies by road rather than sea, which was dominated by the Dutch navy. By 1618, the only part not controlled by Spain ran through the Electoral Palatinate.

Since Emperor Matthias had no surviving children, in July 1617 Philip III of Spain agreed to support Ferdinand II's election as king of Bohemia and Hungary. In return, Ferdinand made concessions to Spain in northern Italy and Alsace and agreed to support their offensive against the Dutch. Doing so required his election as emperor, which was not guaranteed; Maximilian of Bavaria, who opposed the increase of Spanish influence in an area he considered his own, tried to create a coalition to support his candidacy.

Another option was Frederick V, Elector Palatine, a Calvinist who in 1613 married Elizabeth of Bohemia, daughter of James I of England. When Ferdinand was elected king of Bohemia in 1617, he also gained control of its electoral vote, but his conservative Catholicism made him unpopular with the mostly Protestant Bohemian nobility, who were also concerned about the erosion of their rights. Since the seven electors previously consisted of three Protestants and four Catholics, replacing Ferdinand with Frederick would alter the religious balance, making possible the election of a Protestant emperor and the end of Habsburg predominance. (Note: Since electoral votes were associated with the position, rather than the individual, becoming king of Bohemia in addition to Elector Palatine would give Frederick two votes.) These factors combined to bring about the Bohemian Revolt in May 1618.

== Phase I: 1618 to 1635 ==
=== Bohemian Revolt ===
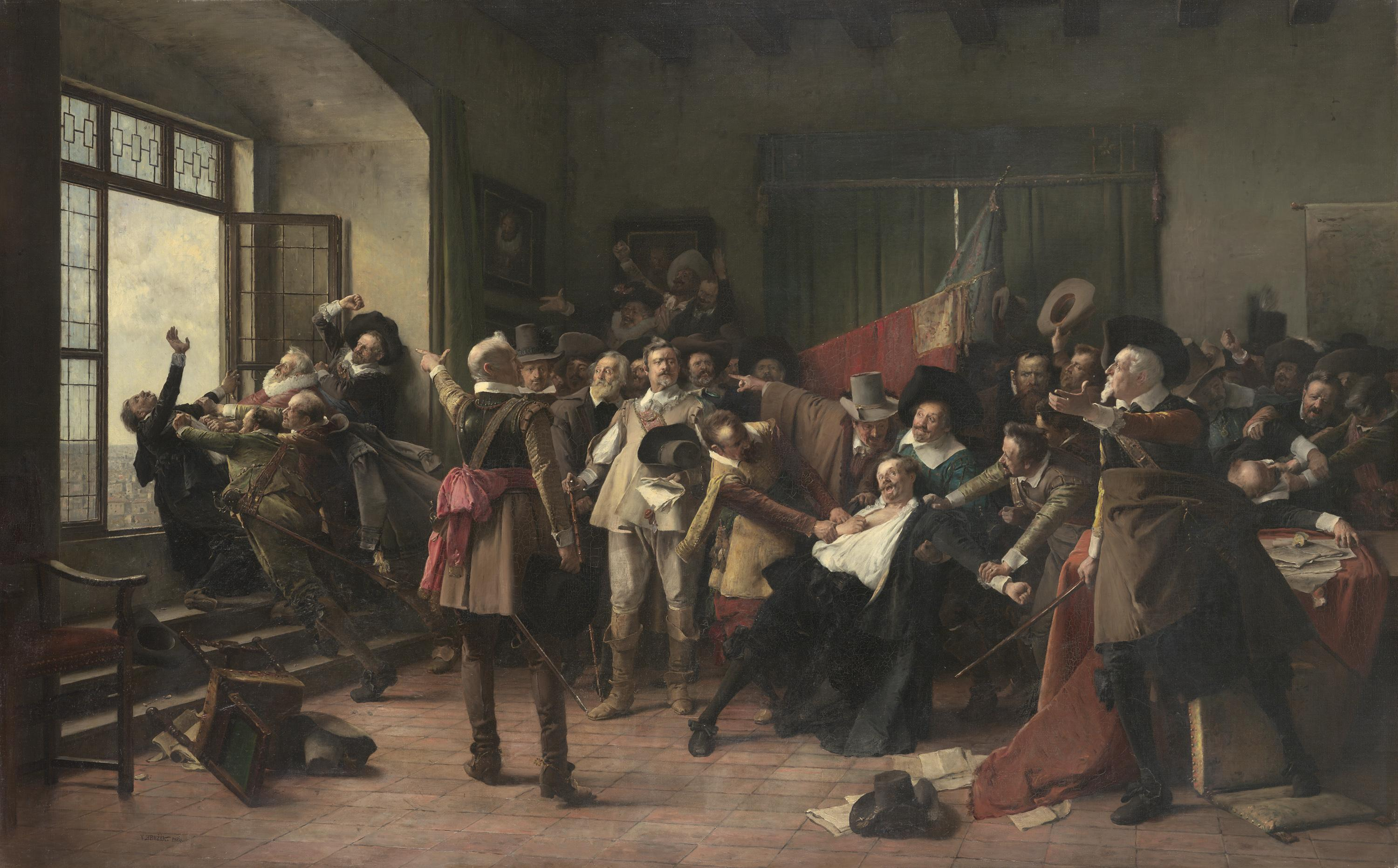
19th-century depiction of the Third Defenestration of Prague (1618), which marked the beginning of the Bohemian Revolt, and therefore of the first phase of the Thirty Years' War.

Ferdinand once claimed he would rather see his lands destroyed than tolerate heresy within them. Less than 18 months after taking control of Styria in 1595, he had eliminated Protestantism in what had been a stronghold of the Reformation. Their war in the Netherlands meant the Spanish Habsburgs preferred to avoid antagonising Protestants elsewhere. However, while recognising the dangers of Ferdinand's fervent Catholicism, they ultimately supported his claim due to lack of alternatives.

Elected king of Bohemia in May 1617, Ferdinand reconfirmed Protestant religious freedoms, but his record in Styria led to the suspicion he was only awaiting a chance to overturn them. These concerns were heightened after a series of legal disputes over property were all decided in favour of the Catholic Church. In May 1618, Protestant nobles led by Count Thurn met in Prague Castle with Ferdinand's two Catholic representatives, Vilem Slavata and Jaroslav Borzita. In what became known as the Third Defenestration of Prague, both men were thrown out of the castle windows along with their secretary Filip Fabricius, although all three survived.

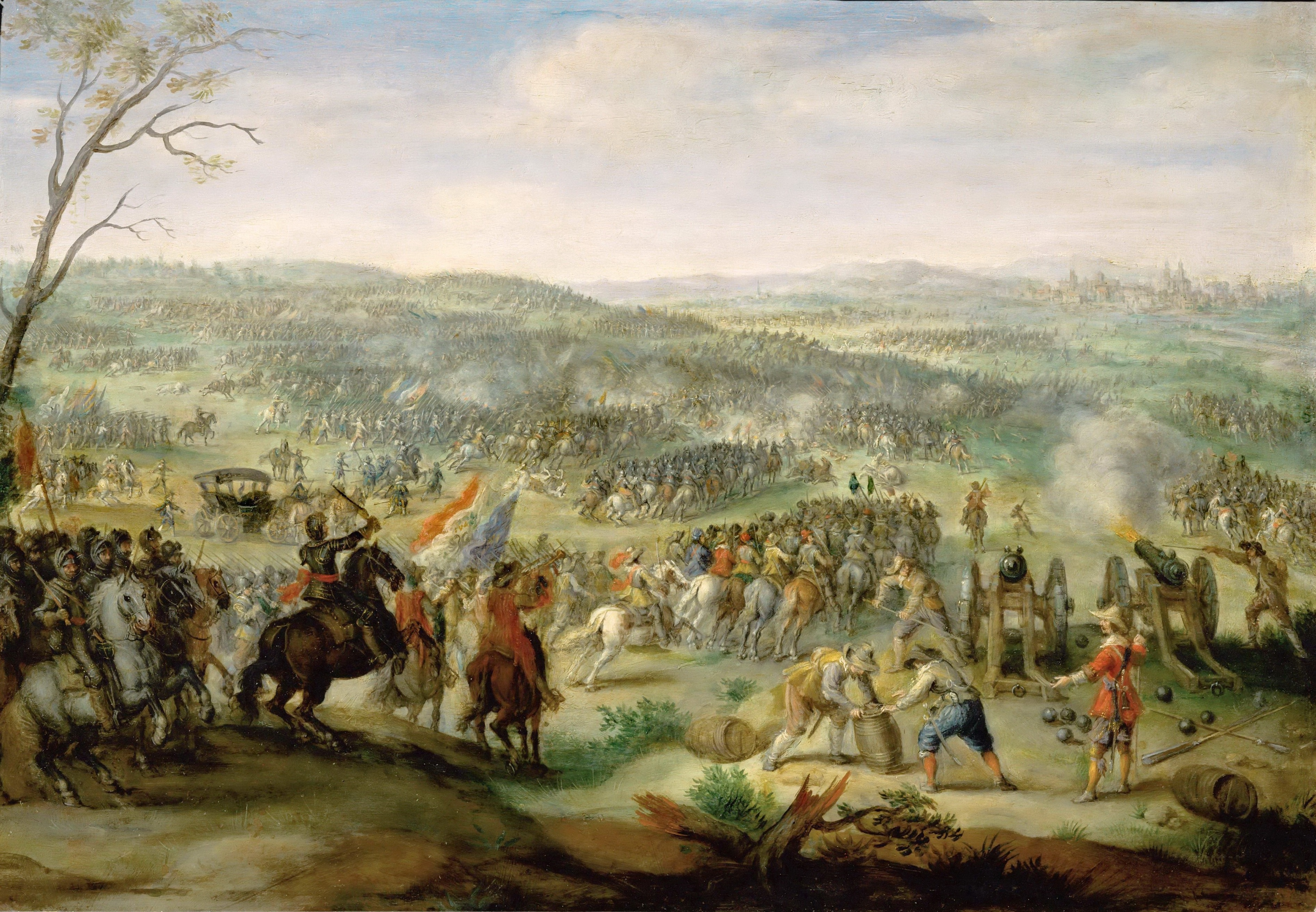
The Battle of White Mountain, oil painting by Peter Snayers

Thurn established a Protestant-dominated government in Bohemia, while unrest expanded into Silesia and the Habsburg heartlands of Lower and Upper Austria, where much of the nobility was also Protestant. Losing control of these threatened the entire Habsburg state, while in addition to its crucial electoral vote, Bohemia was one of the most prosperous areas of the Empire. Regaining control was vital for the Austrian Habsburgs, but chronic financial weakness left them dependent on Maximilian and Spain for the resources needed to achieve this.

Spanish involvement in Bohemia drew in the Dutch and their ally, France, although the strongly Catholic Louis XIII faced his own domestic Protestant rebellion and refused to support them elsewhere. Elsewhere, Charles Emmanuel I, Duke of Savoy helped Frederick fund a mercenary army under Ernst von Mansfeld, which was sent to support the Bohemian rebels. Attempts by Maximilian and John George of Saxony to broker a negotiated solution ended when Emperor Matthias died in March 1619, since many believed the loss of his authority and influence had fatally damaged the Habsburgs.

By mid-June 1619, an army led by Thurn was outside Vienna, and despite defeating Mansfeld at Sablat, Ferdinand's position continued to worsen. Gabriel Bethlen, the Calvinist Prince of Transylvania, invaded Hungary and besieged Vienna with Ottoman support, although war with Poland–Lithuania in 1620, followed by the 1623 to 1639 conflict with Persia, prevented their direct participation.

The Bohemian-Palatinate phase

On 19 August, the Bohemian Estates rescinded Ferdinand's 1617 election as king and a week later formally offered the crown to Frederick. On 28 August, Ferdinand was elected Holy Roman Emperor, making war inevitable if Frederick accepted the Bohemian crown. Most of Frederick's advisors urged him to reject it, as did the Duke of Savoy, and his father-in-law James I.

However, he received backing from Christian of Anhalt, along with Maurice of Orange, for whom conflict in Germany was a means to divert Spanish resources from the Netherlands. The Dutch offered subsidies to Frederick and the Protestant Union, helped raise loans for Bohemia, and provided weapons and munitions. However, wider European support failed to materialise, largely due to lack of enthusiasm for removing a legally elected ruler, regardless of religion.

Although Frederick accepted the crown and entered Prague in October 1619, his support eroded over the next few months. In July 1620, the Protestant Union proclaimed its neutrality, while John George of Saxony backed Ferdinand in return for the cession of Lusatia and a guarantee of Lutheran rights in Bohemia. Maximilian of Bavaria funded a combined Imperial-Catholic League army led by Count Tilly and the Count de Bucquoy, which pacified Upper and Lower Austria and occupied western Bohemia before marching on Prague. Defeated at the Battle of White Mountain in November 1620, the Bohemian army disintegrated, and Frederick fled the country.

=== Palatinate campaign ===
By abandoning Frederick, the German princes hoped to restrict the dispute to Bohemia, an objective thwarted by Maximilian's dynastic ambitions. In the October 1619 Treaty of Munich, Ferdinand transferred the Palatinate's electoral vote to Bavaria, and allowed Maximilian to annex the Upper Palatinate. Many Protestants had supported Ferdinand against Frederick because they opposed the deposition of a legally elected ruler, and now objected to his removal on the same grounds. For Catholics, it presented an opportunity to regain lands and properties lost since 1555, a combination which destabilised large parts of the Empire.

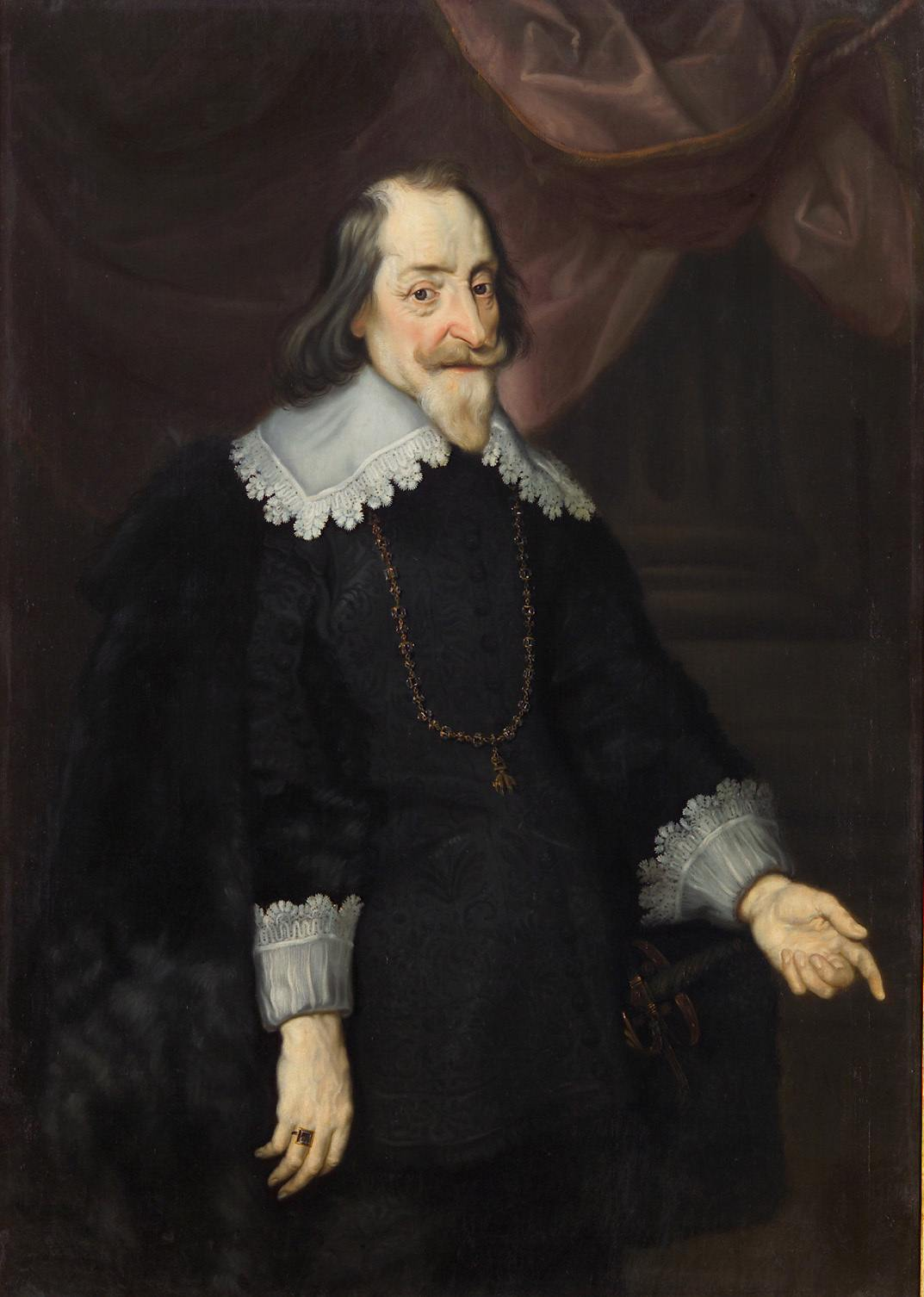
Maximilian I, Elector of Bavaria whose seizure of the Palatinate expanded the war

At the same time, Spain was drawn into the conflict due to the strategic importance of the Spanish Road, and its proximity to the Palatinate. When an army led by Córdoba occupied the Lower Palatinate in October 1619, James I sent English naval forces against Spanish colonies in the Americas, and threatened war if Spanish troops were not withdrawn by spring 1621. These actions were primarily designed to placate his opponents in Parliament, for whom his pro-Spanish policy was a betrayal of the Protestant cause. Spanish chief minister Count-Duke Olivares correctly interpreted them as an invitation to open negotiations, and in return for an Anglo-Spanish alliance offered to restore Frederick to his Rhineland possessions.

Since Frederick's demand for full restitution of his lands and titles was incompatible with the Treaty of Munich, hopes of a negotiated peace quickly evaporated. Despite defeat in Bohemia, Frederick still had allies including Georg Friedrich of Baden and Christian of Brunswick, while the Dutch provided military support and his father-in-law James funded an army of mercenaries under Mansfeld. However, failure to co-ordinate effectively led to defeats at Wimpfen in May 1622, after which Georg Friedrich made peace, and Höchst in June.

By November 1622, Spanish and imperial troops controlled most of the Palatinate, apart from Frankenthal, which was held by a small English garrison under Sir Horace Vere. After Höchst, Mansfeld and Christian united at Hagenau before moving towards the Netherlands. They were stopped by Córdoba at Fleurus, but the Protestant army escaped destruction, and made it to Bergen op Zoom. Frederick arrived in the Netherlands in 1622, where he lived in The Hague until his death in November 1632.

When the Imperial Diet met in February 1623, Ferdinand forced through provisions transferring Frederick's titles, lands, and electoral vote to Maximilian. He did so with support from the Catholic League, despite strong opposition from Protestant members, as well as the Spanish. The Palatinate was clearly lost, and in March Vere surrendered Frankenthal, while campaigning ended with Tilly's victory over Christian of Brunswick at Stadtlohn in August. However, Spanish and Dutch involvement was a significant step in internationalising the war, while Frederick's removal meant other Protestant princes began planning how to preserve their own rights and territories.

=== Danish intervention (1625–1629) ===
Key locations, 1625–1629 on the map of the modern federal state of Lower Saxony

With Saxony dominating the Upper Saxon Circle and Brandenburg the Lower, both kreise remained neutral in the early stages. However, Frederick's deposition in 1623 united the Lutheran John George of Saxony and Calvinist George William, Elector of Brandenburg, over concerns Ferdinand intended to reclaim Catholic territories. These were strengthened in early 1625 when territories held by Protestants since 1566 were returned by Tilly to the Roman Catholic Diocese of Halberstadt.

As Duke of Holstein, Christian IV was also a member of the Lower Saxon circle, while the Danish economy relied on the Baltic trade and tolls from traffic through the Øresund. In 1621, Hamburg accepted Danish "supervision", while his son Frederick became joint-administrator of Lübeck, Bremen, and Verden, thus ensuring Danish control of the Elbe and Weser rivers.

Ferdinand had paid Albrecht von Wallenstein for his support against Frederick with estates confiscated from the Bohemian rebels, and now contracted with him to conquer the north on a similar basis. In May 1625, the Lower Saxony kreis elected Christian their military commander, although this was initially opposed by Saxony and Brandenburg, who viewed Denmark and Sweden as competitors, and wanted to avoid either becoming involved in the empire. Attempts to negotiate a peaceful solution failed as the conflict in Germany became part of the wider struggle between France and their Habsburg rivals in Spain and Austria.

In the June 1624 Treaty of Compiègne, France had agreed to subsidise the Dutch war against Spain for a minimum of three years, while in the December 1625 Treaty of The Hague, the Dutch and English agreed to finance Danish intervention in the Empire. (Note: As well as being brother-in-law to Frederick of the Palatinate, James I was also linked to Christian IV of Denmark, having married his elder sister Anne of Denmark (1574–1619).) Hoping to create a wider coalition against Ferdinand, the Dutch invited France, Sweden, Savoy, Transylvania, and the Republic of Venice to join, but it was overtaken by events. In early 1626, Cardinal Richelieu, main architect of the alliance, faced a new Huguenot rebellion at home and in the March Treaty of Monzón, France withdrew from northern Italy and the critical Valtellina Pass, re-opening the Spanish Road.

Danish intervention

Dutch and English subsidies enabled Christian to devise an ambitious three-part campaign plan. While he led the main force down the Weser, Mansfeld would attack Wallenstein in Magdeburg, supported by forces led by Christian of Brunswick and Maurice of Hesse-Kassel. However, Mansfeld was defeated at Dessau Bridge in April, and when Maurice refused to support him, Christian of Brunswick fell back to Wolfenbüttel, where he died of disease shortly after. The Danes were comprehensively beaten at Lutter in August, and Mansfeld's army retreated south to the Ottoman Empire, where his army dissolved after his death in November.

Many of Christian's German allies, such as Hesse-Kassel, had little interest in replacing imperial domination with Danish, while few of the Dutch or English subsidies were ever paid. Charles I of England allowed Christian to recruit up to 9,000 Scottish mercenaries, but they took time to arrive, and although able to slow Wallenstein's advance, were insufficient to stop him. By the end of 1627, Wallenstein had occupied Mecklenburg, Pomerania, and Jutland, and began making plans to construct a fleet capable of challenging Danish control of the Baltic. He was supported by Spain, for whom it provided an opportunity to open another front against the Dutch.

On 13 May 1628, his deputy von Arnim besieged Stralsund, the only port with facilities large enough to build this fleet. Gustavus Adolphus responded by sending several thousand Scots to Stralsund under Alexander Leslie, who was also appointed governor. Von Arnim abandoned the siege on 4 August, but three weeks later Christian suffered another defeat at Wolgast. He began negotiations with Wallenstein, who despite his recent victories was concerned by the prospect of Swedish intervention, and thus anxious to make peace.

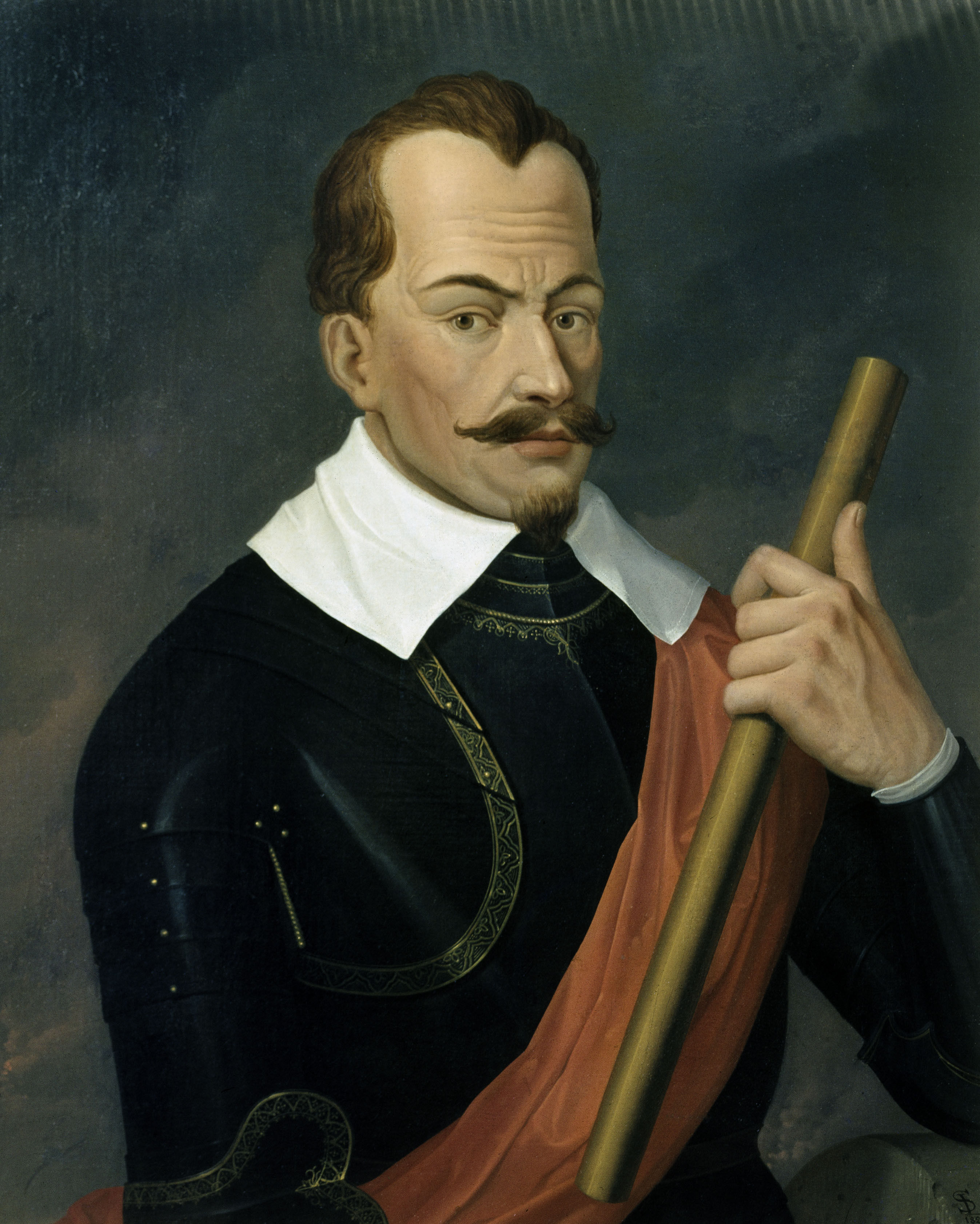
Albrecht von Wallenstein achieved great military success for the Empire but his power threatened both Ferdinand and the German princes.

With Ferdinand's resources stretched by the outbreak of the War of the Mantuan Succession, Wallenstein persuaded him to agree relatively lenient terms in the June 1629 Treaty of Lübeck. These allowed Christian to retain Schleswig and Holstein in return for relinquishing Bremen and Verden, and abandoning support for the German Protestants. While Denmark kept Schleswig and Holstein until 1864, this effectively ended its period as a major power in the Baltic region.

Once again, the methods used to obtain victory explain why the war failed to end. Ferdinand's chronic financial weakness meant Wallenstein raised money by demanding ransoms from towns, while his men plundered the local territory, regardless of whether it belonged to allies or opponents. When Ferdinand deposed the hereditary Duke of Mecklenburg in early 1628 and appointed Wallenstein in his place, the act united all German princes in opposition, regardless of religion. However, Maximilian's desire to retain the Palatinate meant the Catholic League argued only for a return to the position prevailing before 1627, while Protestants wanted that of 1618.

Made overconfident by success, in March 1629, Ferdinand passed an Edict of Restitution, which required all lands taken from the Catholic church after 1555 to be returned. While technically legal, politically it was extremely unwise, since doing so would alter nearly every single state boundary in north and central Germany, deny the existence of Calvinism and restore Catholicism in areas where it had not been a significant presence for nearly a century. Well aware none of the princes involved would agree, Ferdinand used the device of an imperial edict, once again asserting his right to alter laws without consultation. This new assault on "German liberties" ensured continuing opposition and undermined his previous success.

At the same time, Madrid was reluctant to antagonise German Protestants with momentum in the Eighty Years' War moving in favour of the Dutch. The weakening of Spanish finances led to the loss of Oldenzaal in 1626, followed by Groenlo in 1627. This was made worse by the Dutch capture of the Spanish treasure fleet at Matanzas in 1628, while the Mantuan War diverted resources from the Netherlands, allowing Frederick Henry to besiege 's-Hertogenbosch in 1629. Imperial intervention could not prevent its fall, ending Spanish hopes of stopping trade with the Dutch East Indies.

=== Sweden invades Germany (1630–1635) ===
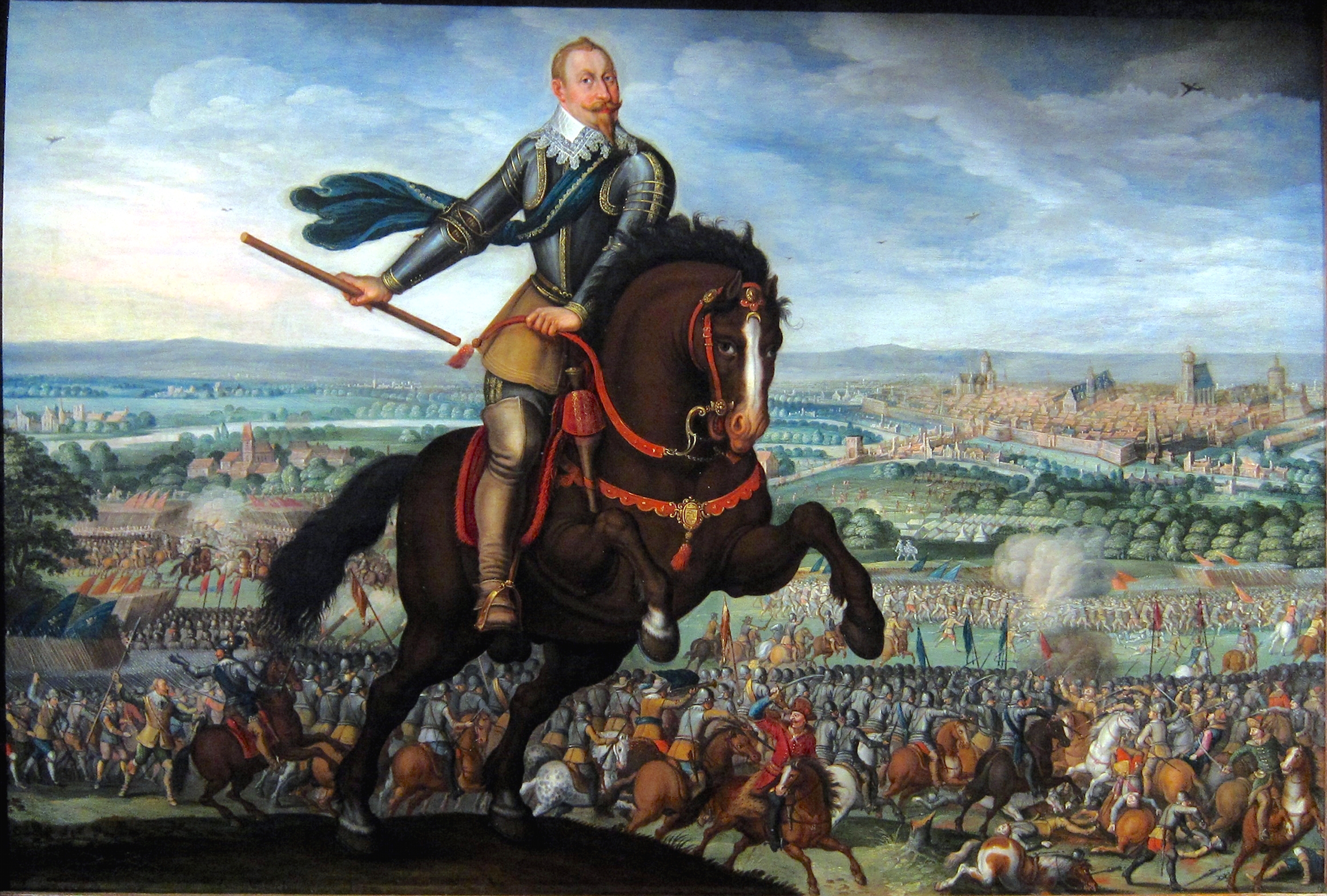
Gustavus Adolphus of Sweden at Breitenfeld in 1631

From 1626 to 1629, Gustavus was engaged in a war with Poland–Lithuania, ruled by his Catholic cousin Sigismund, who also claimed the Swedish throne and was backed by Ferdinand II. Once this conflict ended, and with only a few minor states like Hesse-Kassel still openly opposing Ferdinand, Gustavus became an obvious ally for Richelieu. In September 1629, the latter helped negotiate the Truce of Altmark between Sweden and Poland–Lithuania, freeing Gustavus to enter the war. Partly a genuine desire to support his Protestant co-religionists, like Christian he also wanted to maximise his share of the Baltic trade that provided much of Sweden's income.

After diplomatic negotiations with Ferdinand II failed, Gustavus landed in Pomerania in June 1630 with nearly 18,000 troops. Using Stralsund as a bridgehead, he marched south along the Oder towards Stettin. This allowed him to coerce Bogislaw XIV of Pomerania, into an alliance which secured Swedish interests in Pomerania against Poland–Lithuania, who instead initiated the 1632 to 1634 Smolensk War with Russia.

Although they had successfully secured their eastern flank, Swedish expectations of widespread German support proved unrealistic. By the end of 1630, their only new ally was the Administrator of Magdeburg, Christian William whose capital was under siege by Tilly. Despite the devastation inflicted by Wallenstein, Saxony and Brandenburg were ambivalent about Swedish intervention. Both states had their own ambitions in Pomerania, while experience showed inviting external powers into the Empire was easier than getting them to leave.

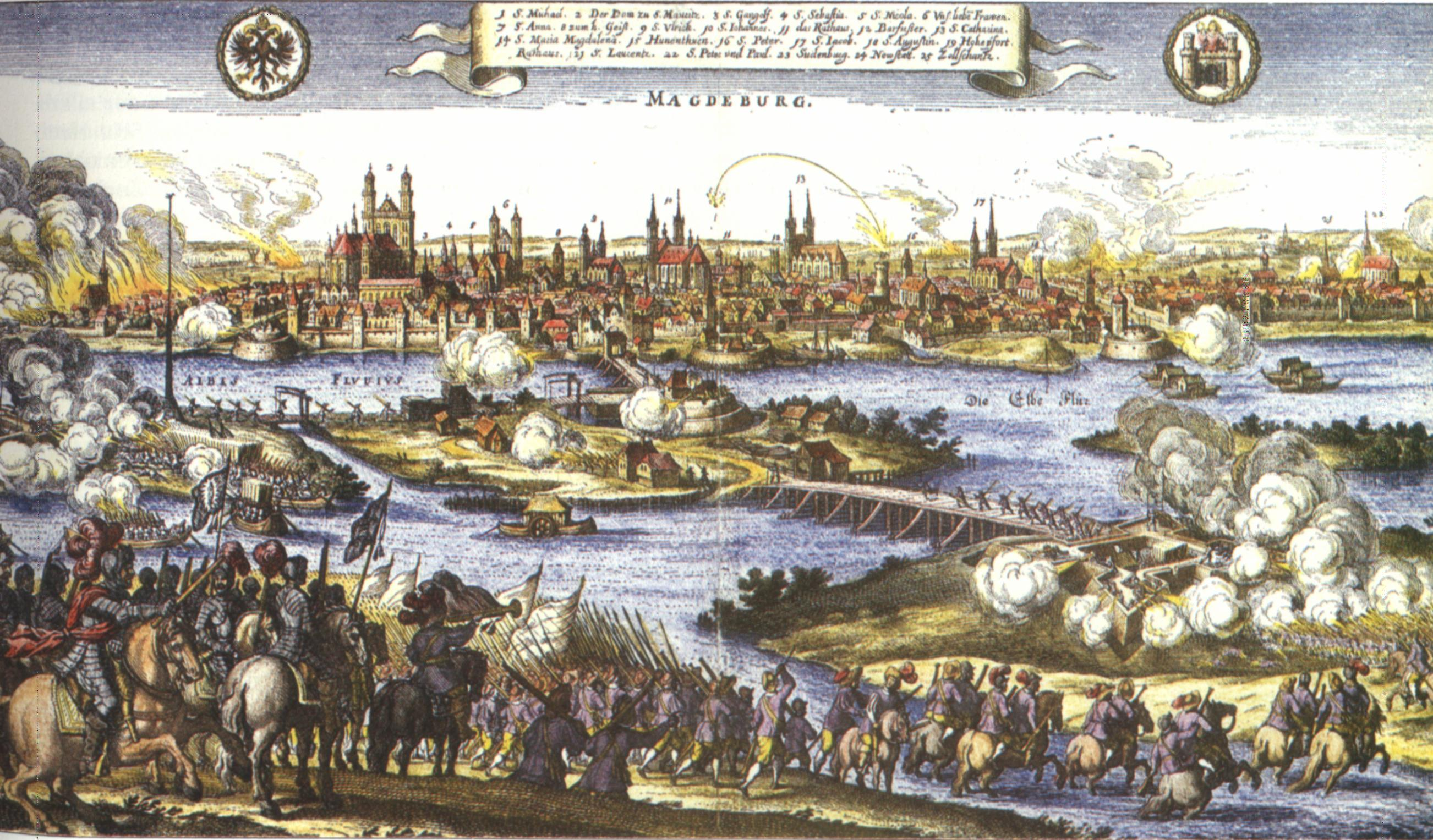
The Sack of Magdeburg in 1631

Gustavus put pressure on Brandenburg by sacking Küstrin and Frankfurt an der Oder and then bombarding George William in Berlin, while the Sack of Magdeburg in May 1631 provided a powerful warning of the consequences of imperial victory. Once again, French financial power bridged differences between the potential allies, and under the 1631 Treaty of Bärwalde, Richelieu agreed to fund the Swedes and German states including Hesse-Kassel, Saxony, and Brandenburg. Payments amounted to 400,000 Reichstaler per year, or one million livres, enabling Sweden to support a total of 36,000 troops.

With this army, Gustavus invaded southern Germany, winning victories at Breitenfeld in September 1631, then Rain in April 1632, where Tilly was killed. However, Wallenstein realised the Swedes were overextended, and established himself at Fürth, across their supply lines to the Baltic. At the Battle of the Alte Veste in late August, a failed Swedish assault on the Imperial camp outside the town was bloodily repulsed, arguably the greatest blunder committed by Gustavus during his German campaign.

Campaigns during the Swedish phase

Two months later, the Swedes and Imperialists met at Lützen, where both sides suffered heavy casualties. Gustavus himself was killed and some Swedish units incurred losses of over 60%. Fighting continued until dusk when Wallenstein retreated, abandoning his artillery and wounded. Despite the loss of Gustavus, most commentators consider the battle a Swedish victory, although the result continues to be disputed.

After his death, Gustavus' policies were continued by his Chancellor Axel Oxenstierna, and Bernard of Saxe-Weimar and Gustav Horn. With French backing, Sweden and a number of smaller German states formed the Heilbronn League in April 1633, although Brunswick-Lüneburg, Saxony, and Brandenburg remained outside. In July, the Swedes and their allies defeated a Bavarian army at Oldendorf. Wallenstein's critics claimed this was due to his failure to support them, while rumours spread that he was preparing to switch sides. Ferdinand II ordered his arrest in February 1634, and he was assassinated by his own officers in Cheb on 25th.

The loss of Wallenstein and his organisation left Ferdinand II reliant on Spain for military support. Since their main concern was to re-open the Spanish Road for their campaign against the Dutch, the focus of the war now shifted from the north to the Rhineland and Bavaria. Cardinal-Infante Ferdinand of Austria, new Governor of the Spanish Netherlands, raised an army of 18,000 in Italy, which met up with 15,000 Imperial troops at Donauwörth on 2 September 1634. Four days later, their combined army defeated Horn and Bernard at Nördlingen, a result that cost Sweden control of southern Germany.

== Phase II: French intervention, 1635 to 1648 ==
By triggering direct French intervention, Nördlingen expanded the conflict rather than ending it. Richelieu provided the Swedes with new subsidies, hired mercenaries led by Bernard of Saxe-Weimar for an offensive in the Rhineland, and in May 1635 initiated the Franco–Spanish War (1635–1659). A few days later, the German states and Ferdinand agreed to the Peace of Prague. In return for withdrawing the Edict of Restitution, the Heilbronn and Catholic Leagues agreed to dissolve their forces, which were replaced by a single Imperial army, although Saxony and Bavaria retained control of their own forces. This is generally seen as the point when the war ceased to be a primarily inter-German religious conflict.

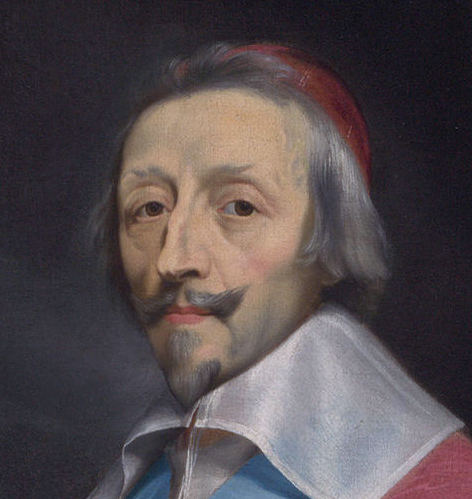
Cardinal Richelieu, French chief minister from 1624 until 1642, and creator of the anti-Habsburg alliance

In March 1635, French soldiers entered the Valtellina, cutting the link between Milan and the Empire. This was followed in May by an invasion of the Spanish Netherlands, which collapsed with the loss of 17,000 men. In March 1636, France joined the Thirty Years' War as an ally of Sweden, which was increasingly reliant on French financing for its continued participation. (Note: While the death of Gustavus was greeted with dismay by most European Protestants, Richelieu was more ambivalent. The two were increasingly at odds over strategic objectives, although there is no evidence for contemporary claims he was involved in the king's death.) The Spanish responded by invading northern France, causing panic in Paris before lack of supplies forced them to retreat. Elsewhere, Saxony began the year by occupying Pomerania, before defeats at Dömitz and Wittstock in October re-established Swedish predominance in northeast Germany.

Ferdinand II died in February 1637, and was succeeded by his son Ferdinand III, who faced a precarious military position. Although Matthias Gallas had forced Johan Banér, the new Swedish commander, back to the Baltic, in March 1638 Bernard of Saxe Weimar destroyed an Imperial army at Rheinfelden. His capture of Breisach in December severed the Spanish Road, while Charles I Louis raised an army to regain his father's possessions in the Palatinate. Although the latter was routed by von Hatzfeldt at Vlotho in October, lack of supplies obliged Gallas to withdraw from the Baltic.

In April 1639, Banér defeated the Saxons at Chemnitz, then invaded Bohemia in May. To retrieve the situation, Ferdinand diverted Piccolomini's army from Thionville, ending direct military cooperation between Austria and Spain. Pressure grew on Olivares to make peace, especially after French and Swedish gains in Germany cut the Spanish Road, forcing Spain to resupply their armies in Flanders by sea. Attempts to re-assert maritime control ended when the Dutch fleet under Maarten Tromp won a significant victory over the Spanish at the Downs in October 1639.

The French occupied Spanish-controlled Artois in 1640, while Dutch attacks on Portuguese colonies, combined with opposition to taxes, led to revolts in both Portugal and Catalonia. Olivares now argued Spain should accept Dutch independence, and focus on preventing further French gains in the Spanish Netherlands. This appeared achievable since most of the Dutch regenten believed the war was won, the only question being the price of peace. They therefore reduced the army budget for 1640, despite objections from Frederick Henry.

Key locations 1635 to 1648 mentioned in text

After Bernard died in July 1639, his troops joined Banér's Swedish army in an ineffectual campaign along the Weser, the highlight being a surprise attack in January 1641 on the Imperial Diet in Regensburg. Forced to retreat, Banér reached Halberstadt in May where he died, and despite beating off an Imperial force at Wolfenbüttel in June, his largely German troops mutinied due to lack of pay. The situation was saved by the arrival of Lennart Torstensson in November with 7,000 Swedish recruits and enough cash to satisfy the mutineers.

The French won a victory at Kempen with Hessian support in January 1642. This was followed by a Swedish victory at Breitenfeld in October 1642, where Torstensson inflicted almost 10,000 casualties on an Imperial army led by Archduke Leopold Wilhelm of Austria. The Swedes captured Leipzig in December, although they failed to take Freiberg, and by 1643 the Saxon army had been reduced to a few isolated garrisons. Despite these setbacks, Ferdinand fought on, hoping to improve his position enough to exclude the Imperial Estates from his peace negotiations with France and Sweden, and allow him to represent the Empire as a whole.

This seemed more likely when Richelieu died in December 1642, followed by Louis XIII in May 1643, leaving his five-year-old son Louis XIV as king. However, Richelieu's policies were continued by his successor Cardinal Mazarin, while gains in Alsace allowed France to focus on the war against Spain. In 1643, the Army of Flanders invaded northern France, but were decisively beaten by Condé at Rocroi on 19 May. This ended any prospect of re-opening the Spanish Road, and Madrid finally accepted the reality of Dutch independence.

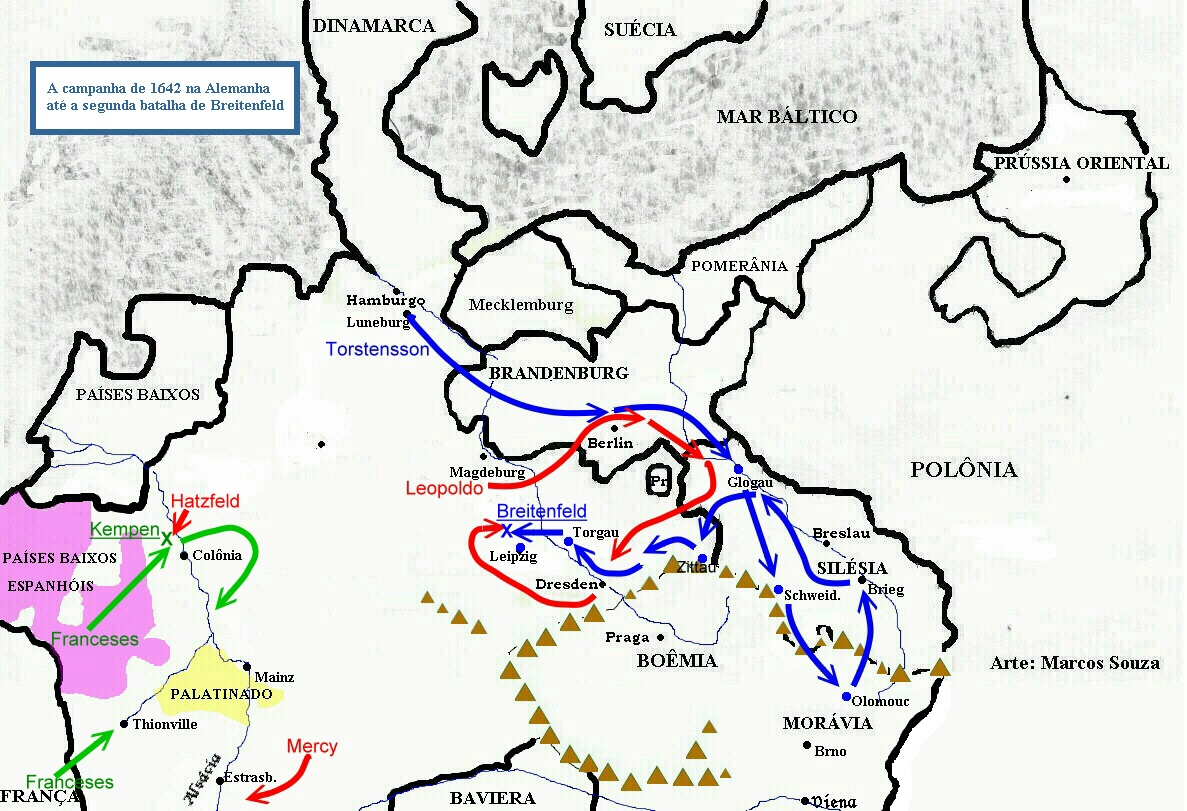
Campaigns during the Franco-Swedish phase (until 1642)

However, Condé was unable to fully exploit his victory due to factors affecting all combatants. The devastation inflicted by 25 years of warfare meant armies spent more time foraging than fighting, forcing them to become smaller and more mobile, with a much greater emphasis on cavalry. Difficulties in gathering provisions meant campaigns started later, and restricted them to areas that could be easily supplied, usually close to rivers. In addition, the French army in Germany was shattered at Tuttlingen in November by Bavarian general Franz von Mercy.

Soon after Rocroi, Ferdinand invited Sweden and France to attend peace talks in the Westphalian towns of Münster and Osnabrück, but negotiations were delayed when Christian of Denmark blockaded Hamburg and increased toll payments in the Baltic. This severely impacted the Dutch and Swedish economies, and in December 1643 the Torstensson War began when the Swedes invaded Jutland with Dutch naval support. The Swedish attack on Jutland, commanded by Torstensson, was accompanied by another invasion through Scania, led by Gustav Horn. Ferdinand assembled an army under Gallas to attack the Swedes from the rear and to support Denmark, which proved a disastrous decision. Leaving Wrangel to finish the war in Denmark, in May 1644 Torstensson marched back into Germany. Gallas was unable to stop him, and the Danes sued for peace after their defeat at Fehmarn in October 1644.

In August 1644, the French and Bavarian armies met in the three day Battle of Freiburg, in which both sides suffered heavy casualties. Convinced the war could no longer be won, Maximilian now put pressure on Ferdinand to end the conflict. Shortly after peace talks restarted in November, Gallas' army disintegrated and the remnants retreated into Bohemia, where they were scattered by Torstensson at Jankau in March 1645. In May, Bavarians under von Mercy destroyed a French detachment at Herbsthausen, before he in turn was defeated and killed at Second Nördlingen in August. In September, John George of Saxony signed a six-month truce with Sweden, then agreed to remain neutral in the March 1646 Treaty of Eulenberg.

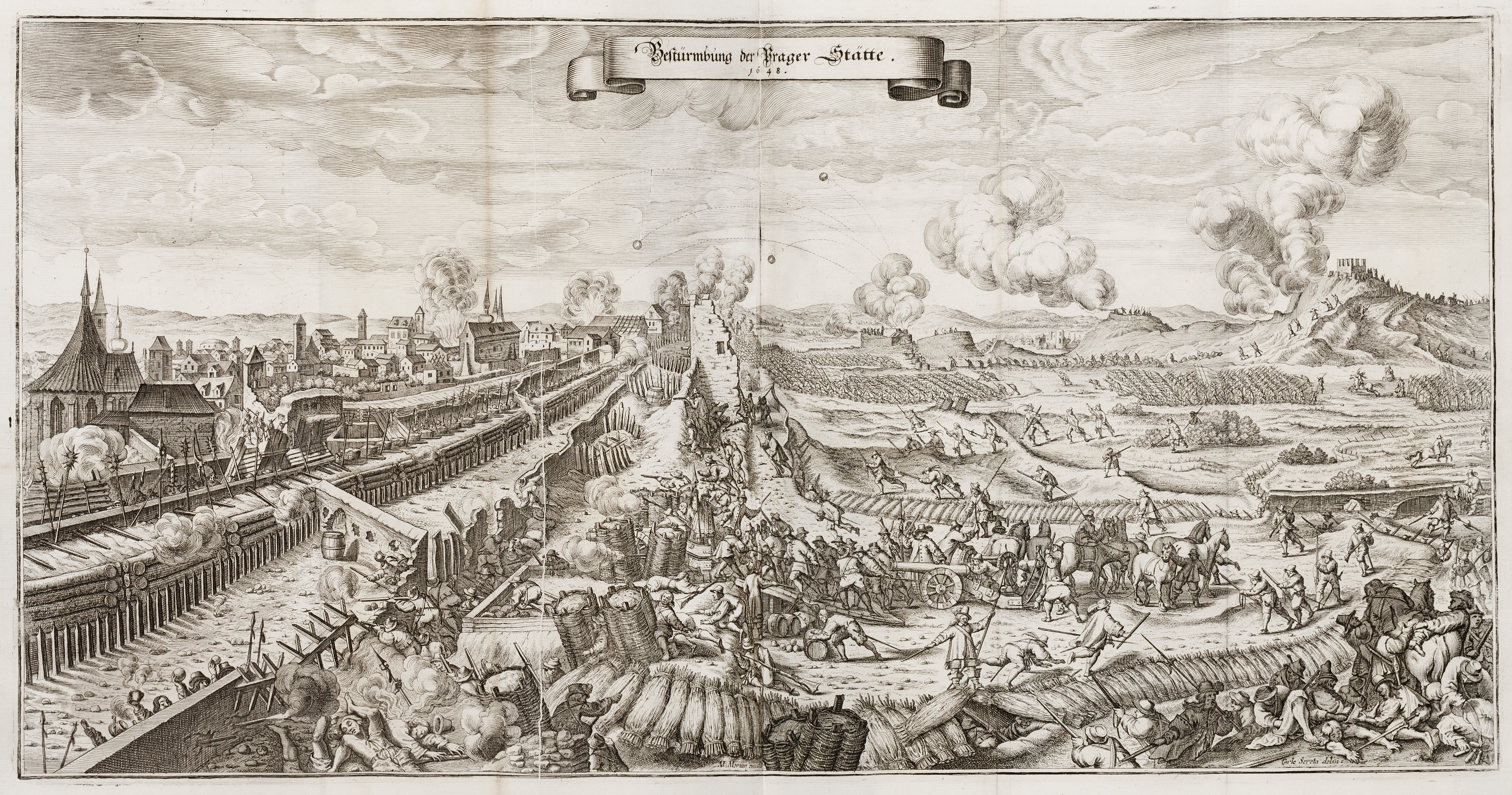
The final battle of the war; the Swedish Siege of Prague in 1648

Under Turenne, French commander in the Rhineland, and Wrangel, who had replaced Torstensson, the French and Swedes separately invaded Bavaria in the summer of 1646. Maximilian was soon desperate to end the war he was largely responsible for starting, at which point the Spanish publicised a secret offer by Mazarin to exchange French-occupied Catalonia for the Spanish Netherlands. Angered by this duplicity, the Dutch agreed a truce with Spain in January 1647 and began to negotiate their own peace terms. Having failed to acquire the Netherlands through diplomacy, Mazarin decided to do so by force. To free up resources for the attempt, on 14 March 1647 he signed the Truce of Ulm with Bavaria, Cologne and Sweden.

The planned offensive fell apart when Turenne's mostly German troops mutinied, while Bavarian general Johann von Werth refused to comply with the truce. Although the mutinies were quickly suppressed, Maximilian felt obliged to follow Werth's example, and in September ordered Bronckhorst-Gronsfeld to combine the remnants of the Bavarian army with Imperial troops under Peter von Holzappel. Outnumbered by a Franco-Swedish army led by Wrangel and Turenne, they were defeated at Zusmarshausen in May 1648. Holzappel was killed, and although most of his army escaped thanks to Raimondo Montecuccoli, Bavaria was left defenceless once again.

The Swedes sent a second force under von Königsmarck to attack Prague, seizing the castle and Malá Strana district in July. The main objective was to gain as much loot as possible before the war ended; they failed to take the Old Town but captured treasures including the Codex Gigas, which can now be seen in Stockholm. When a Spanish offensive in Flanders ended with defeat at Lens in August 1648, Ferdinand finally agreed terms and on 24 October, he signed peace treaties with France and Sweden, ending the war.

== Italy ==
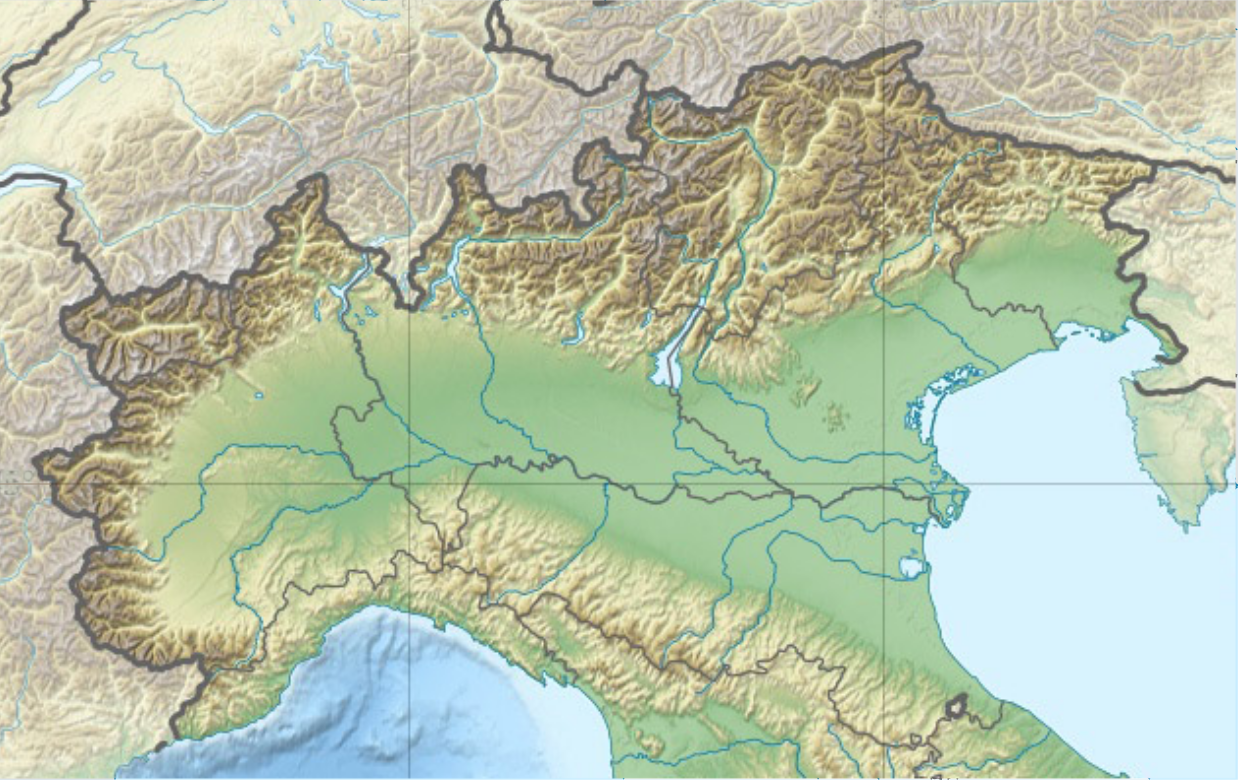
Northern Italy

Control of Northern Italy provided access to the vulnerable southern borders of France and Austria. It also contained large sections of the Spanish Road, which allowed Spain to safely move recruits from Italy to support their war in the Netherlands. The French sought to disrupt this vital supply route by attacking the Spanish-held Duchy of Milan, or blocking the Alpine passes.

In 1618, war broke out in the Valtellina between the Catholic Grisons Rebels and the Protestant Three Leagues. Both Spain and France sent troops to support different factions, with France sending the Duke of Rohan and Spain the Duke of Feria. In 1625, Savoy invaded Genoa with French support, while François d'Estrées invaded the Valtellina. Spain then sent the Duke of Feria and the Marquess of Santa Cruz to relieve Genoa, which happened in April 1625. In 1626, France and Spain signed the Treaty of Monzón, with France agreeing to withdraw from the Valtellina and Piedmont.

Montferrat and its fortress of Casale Monferrato were subsidiary territories of the Duchy of Mantua and their possession allowed the holder to threaten Milan. When the Duke of Mantua died in December 1627, France and Spain backed rival claimants, resulting in the 1628 to 1631 War of the Mantuan Succession. The French-born Duke of Nevers was backed by France and the Republic of Venice, his rival the Duke of Guastalla by Spain, Ferdinand II, Savoy and Tuscany. While a relatively minor conflict, the struggle had a disproportionate impact on the Thirty Years War, since Pope Urban VIII viewed Habsburg expansion in Italy as a threat to the Papal States. His opposition to Ferdinand II divided the Catholic powers, and made it acceptable for France to employ Protestant allies against Austria.

In March 1629, the French stormed Savoyard positions in the Pas de Suse, lifted the Spanish siege of Casale, and captured Pinerolo. The Treaty of Suza then ceded the two fortresses to France and allowed their troops unrestricted passage through Savoyard territory, giving them control over Piedmont and the Alpine passes into southern France. However, as soon as the main French army withdrew in late 1629, the Spanish and Savoyards besieged Casale once again. At the same time, mercenaries funded by Ferdinand II were used in a Spanish offensive which routed the main Venetian field army, and forced Nevers to abandon Mantua. By October 1630, the French position seemed so precarious their representatives agreed the Treaty of Ratisbon. It was never ratified, as Richelieu claimed he had not approved the terms.

Several factors restored the French position in northern Italy, notably a devastating outbreak of plague; between 1629 and 1631, over 60,000 died in Milan and 46,000 in Venice, with proportionate losses elsewhere. Richelieu took advantage of the diversion of imperial resources to fund a Swedish invasion of Germany, whose success forced the Spanish-Savoyard alliance to withdraw from Casale and sign the Treaty of Cherasco in April 1631. Nevers was confirmed as Duke of Mantua and although Richelieu's representative, Cardinal Mazarin, agreed to evacuate Pinerolo, it was later secretly returned under an agreement with Victor Amadeus I, Duke of Savoy. With the exception of the 1639 to 1642 Piedmontese Civil War, this secured the French position in northern Italy for the next twenty years.

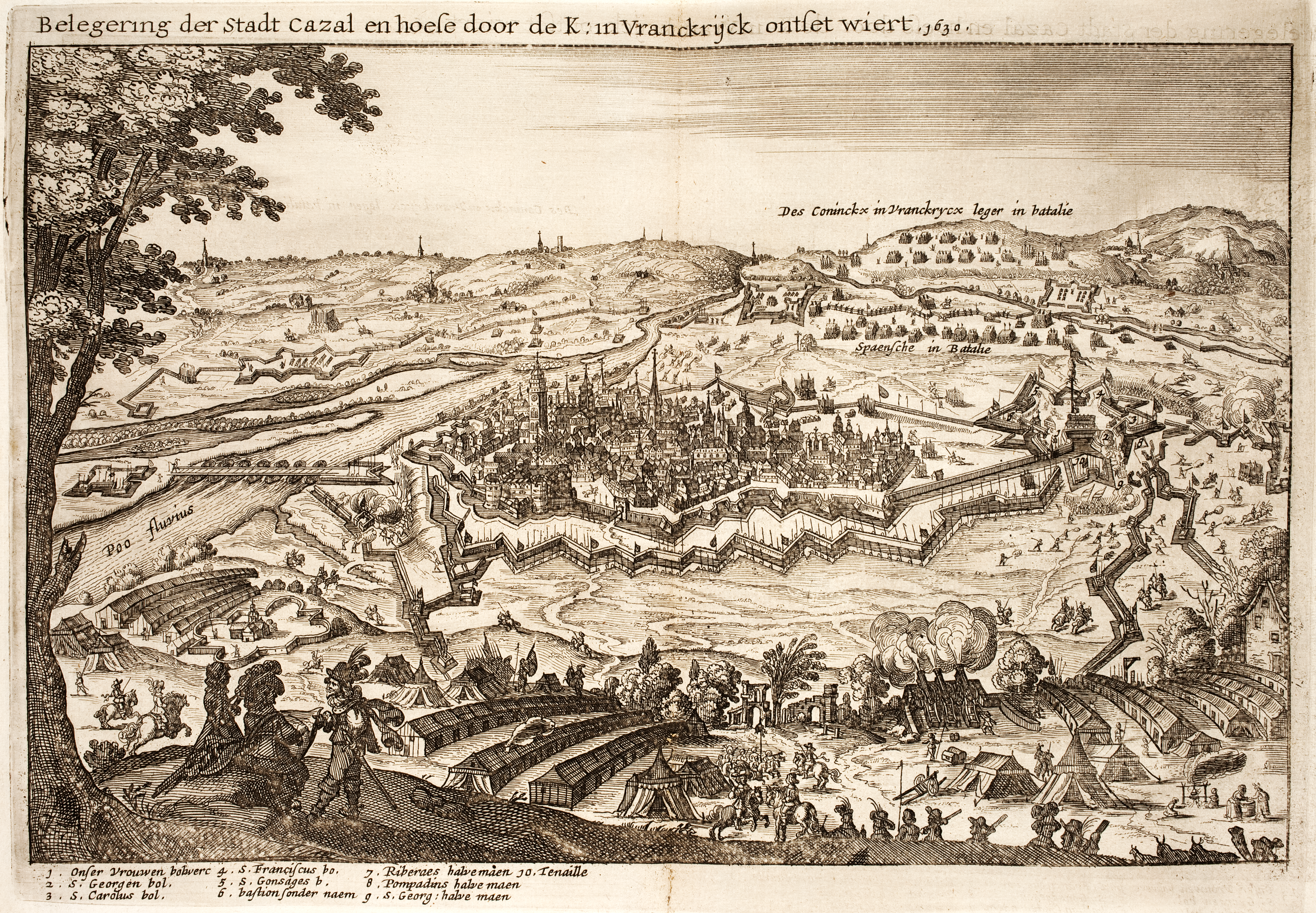
Siege and capture of Casale Monferrato by French troops, 1630

After the outbreak of the Franco–Spanish War in 1635, Richelieu supported a renewed offensive by Victor Amadeus against Milan to tie down Spanish resources. These included an unsuccessful attack on Valenza in 1635, plus minor victories at Tornavento and Mombaldone. However, the anti-Habsburg alliance in northern Italy fell apart when first Charles of Mantua died in September 1637, then Victor Amadeus in October, whose death led to a struggle for control of the Savoyard state between his widow Christine of France and brothers, Thomas and Maurice.

In 1639, their quarrel erupted into open warfare, with France backing Christine and Spain the two brothers, and resulted in the Siege of Turin. One of the most famous military events of the 17th century, at one stage it featured no less than three different armies besieging each other. However, revolts in Portugal and Catalonia forced the Spanish to cease operations in Italy, and the war was settled on terms favourable to Christine and France.

In 1647, a French-backed rebellion succeeded in temporarily overthrowing Spanish rule in Naples. The Spanish quickly crushed the Neapolitan Revolt of 1647 and restored their rule over all of southern Italy, defeating multiple French expeditionary forces sent to back the rebels. However, it exposed the weakness of Spanish rule in Italy and the alienation of the local elites from Madrid. In 1650, the governor of Milan wrote that as well as widespread dissatisfaction in the south, the only one of the Italian states that could be relied on was the Duchy of Parma.

== Iberian Peninsula ==
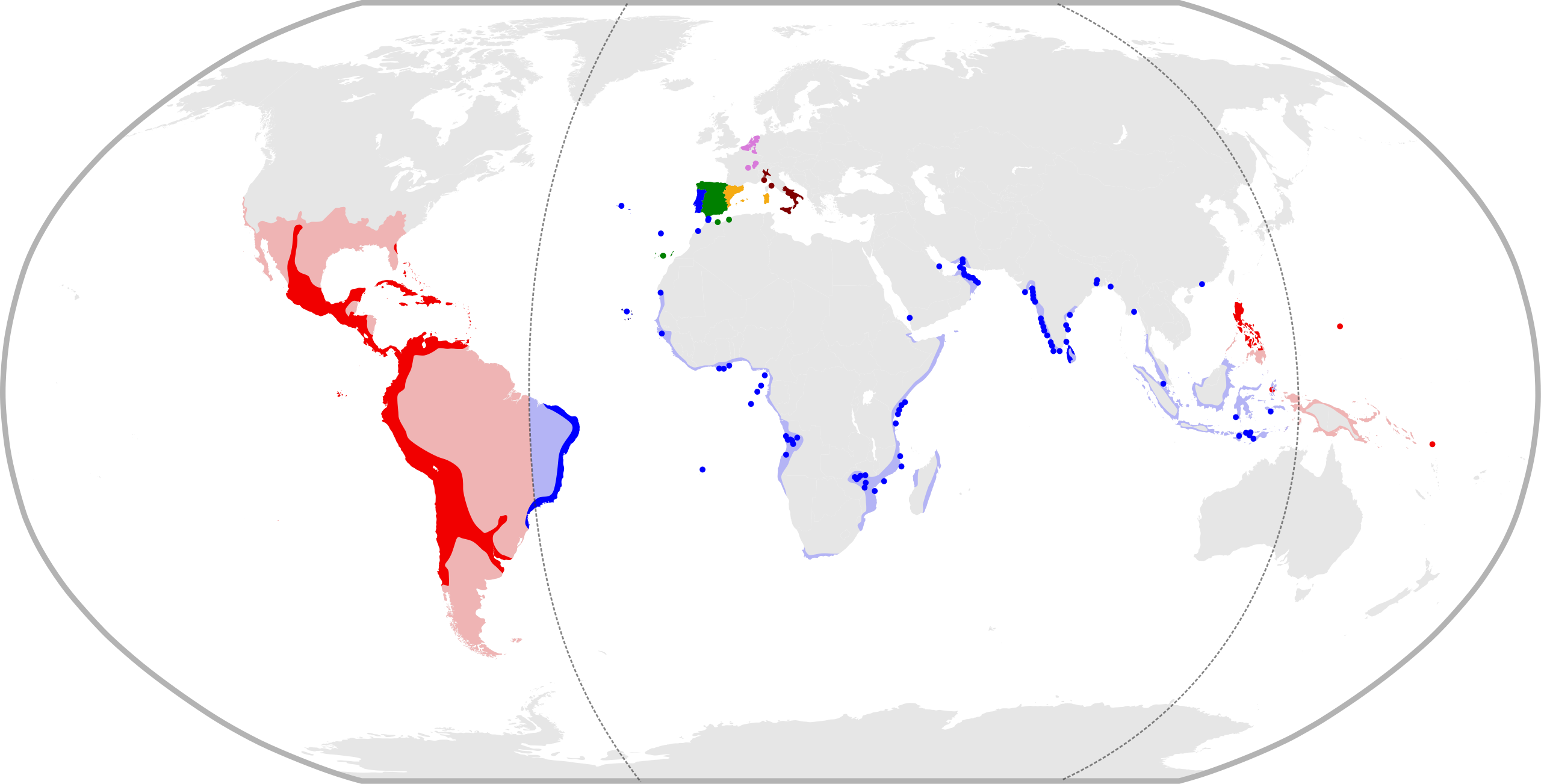
The Iberian Union; Spain's inability to protect Portuguese interests in the 1602 to 1663 Dutch–Portuguese War was a key factor in the 1640 Portuguese Restoration War

Throughout the 1630s, tax increases levied to pay for the war led to protests throughout Spanish territories, which in 1640 resulted in revolts: first in Portugal with the Restoration War to re-gain their independence against the Iberian Union, then in the Principality of Catalonia. Both were backed by France as part of Richelieu's 'war by diversion', in January 1641 the rebels proclaimed a Catalan Republic. The Madrid government quickly assembled an army of 26,000 men to crush the Catalan revolt, which defeated the rebels at Martorell on 23 January 1641. The French now persuaded the Catalan Courts to recognise Louis XIII as Count of Barcelona, and ruler of Catalonia.

On 26 January, a combined French-Catalan force routed a larger Spanish army at Montjuïc and secured Barcelona. However, the rebels soon found the new French administration differed little from the old, turning the war into a three-sided contest between the Franco-Catalan elite, the rural peasantry, and the Spanish. There was little serious fighting after France took control of Perpignan and Roussillon, establishing the current-day Franco-Spanish border in the Pyrenees. The revolt ended in 1651 when Madrid recaptured Barcelona.

== Peace of Westphalia ==
Holy Roman Empire after the Peace of Westphalia, 1648

In its final form, the Peace of Westphalia consisted of three separate agreements. These were the Peace of Münster between Spain and the Dutch Republic, the Treaty of Osnabrück between the Empire and Sweden, and the Treaty of Münster between the Empire and France. Split between Münster and Osnabrück, talks began in 1642, with a total of 109 delegations attending at one time or other. After the Swedes rejected Christian of Denmark as mediator, the negotiators finally agreed on Papal Legate Fabio Chigi, and Venetian envoy Alvise Contarini.

The first to be signed on 30 January 1648, the Peace of Münster forms part of the Westphalia settlement since the Dutch Republic was still considered imperial territory. It confirmed Dutch independence from Spain, although the Republic was not officially acknowledged as being outside the Empire until 1728. The Dutch also gained a monopoly over trade conducted through the Scheldt estuary, ensuring the commercial ascendancy of Amsterdam. Antwerp, capital of the Spanish Netherlands and previously the most important port in northern Europe, would not recover economically until the late 19th century.

The terms of the separate treaties with France and Sweden had first to be agreed by Ferdinand and the Imperial Estates. It has been argued they were a "major turning point in German and European...legal history", because they went beyond normal peace settlements and effected major constitutional and religious changes to the Empire itself. Negotiations were complex and slow, with states like Saxony and Bavaria having very different views on desired outcomes. Ferdinand delayed signing, hoping for an improvement in his military position, but with Swedish troops on the verge of taking Prague, he finally did so on 24 October.

Key elements of the Peace were provisions confirming the autonomy of states within the Empire, Ferdinand's acceptance of the supremacy of the Imperial Diet, and those seeking to prevent future religious conflict. Article 5 reconfirmed the Augsburg settlement, established 1624 as the basis, or "Normaljahr", for determining the dominant religion of a state and guaranteed freedom of worship for religious minorities. Article 7 recognised Calvinism as a Reformed faith and removed the ius reformandi, the requirement that if a ruler changed his religion, his subjects had to follow suit. These terms did not apply to the hereditary lands of the Habsburg monarchy, such as Lower and Upper Austria.

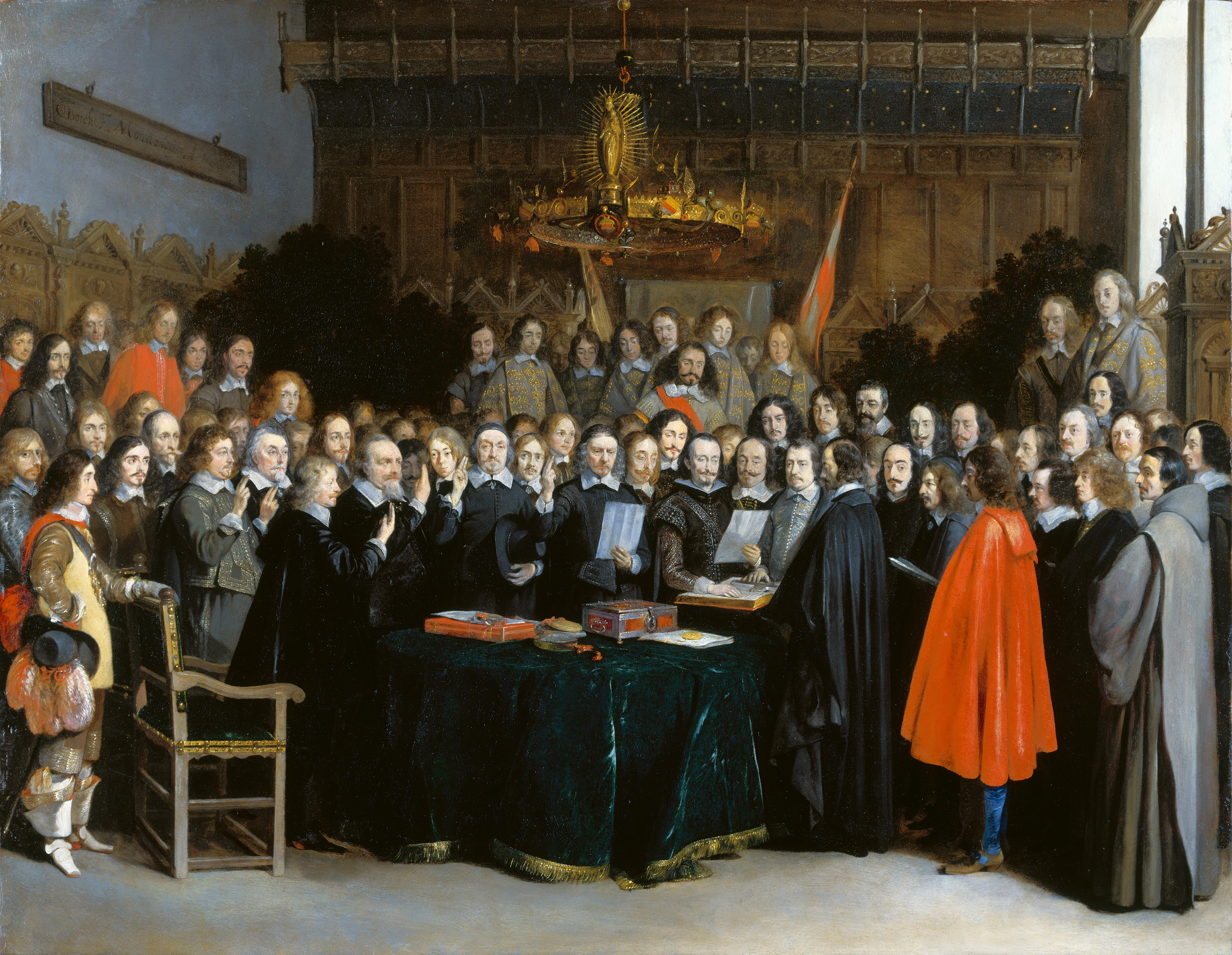
Signing of the Peace of Münster between Spain and the Dutch Republic, 30 January 1648

In terms of territorial concessions, Brandenburg–Prussia received Farther Pomerania, and the bishoprics of Magdeburg, Halberstadt, Kammin, and Minden. Frederick's son Charles Louis regained the Lower Palatinate and became the eighth imperial elector, although Bavaria kept the Upper Palatinate and its electoral vote. In Lorraine, the Three Bishoprics of Metz, Toul and Verdun, occupied by France since 1552, were formally ceded, as were the cities of the Décapole in Alsace, with the exception of Strasbourg and Mulhouse. Sweden received an indemnity of five million thalers, the imperial territories of Swedish Pomerania, and the Prince-bishoprics of Bremen and Verden, which also gave them a seat in the Imperial Diet.

The terms were denounced by Pope Innocent X, for whom the bishoprics ceded to France and Brandenburg were property of the Catholic Church, and thus his to assign. It also disappointed many exiles by accepting Catholicism as the dominant religion in Bohemia, Upper and Lower Austria, all Protestant strongholds prior to 1618. Fighting did not end immediately, since demobilising over 200,000 soldiers took time, and the last Swedish garrison did not leave Germany until 1654. In addition, Mazarin insisted on excluding the Burgundian Circle from the Treaty of Münster, allowing France to continue its campaign against Spain in the Low Countries, a war that continued until the 1659 Treaty of the Pyrenees. The political disintegration of Poland–Lithuania led to the 1655 to 1660 Second Northern War with Sweden, which also involved Denmark, Russia and Brandenburg, while two Swedish attempts to impose its control on the port of Bremen failed in 1654 and 1666.

It has been argued the Peace established the principle known as Westphalian sovereignty, the idea of non-interference in domestic affairs by outside powers, although this has since been challenged. The "Congress" model was used for negotiations at Aix-la-Chapelle in 1668, Nijmegen in 1678, and Ryswick in 1697, although unlike the 19th-century system, these were intended to end wars, rather than prevent them.

== Human and financial cost of the war ==
The Thirty Years' War is part of what historians sometimes call "The General Crisis" of the mid-17th century, a period of sustained conflict and unrest in areas ranging from Ming China to the British Isles, Tsarist Russia and the Holy Roman Empire. In each of these, fighting combined with famine and disease to inflict severe losses on local civilian populations. While the war certainly ranks as one of the worst of these events, 19th-century German nationalists often exaggerated its impact to illustrate the dangers of a divided Germany.

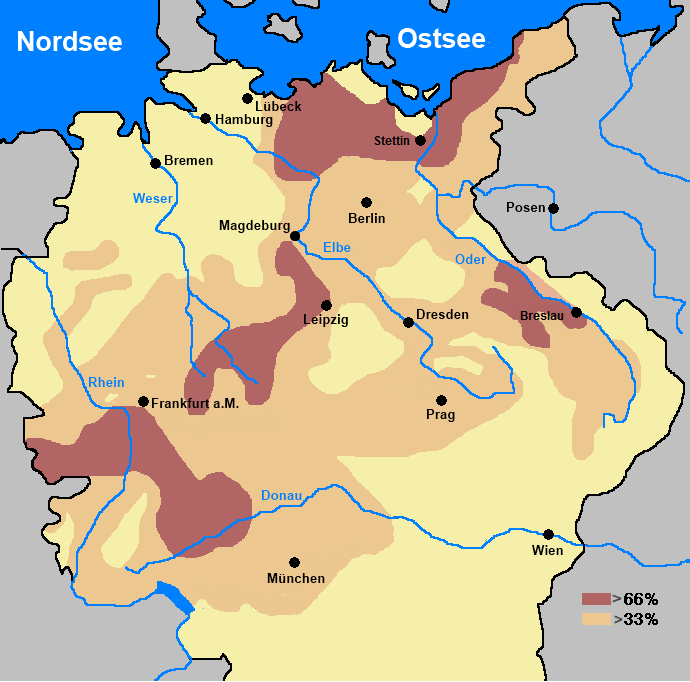
Population decline within Germany, 1618 to 1648 Note: Decline includes factors such as emigration from rural to more secure urban areas and does not equate to deaths 33–66% >66%

Claims of up to 12 million deaths from a population of 18 million are no longer considered realistic, while upper estimates of material losses are not supported by contemporary evidence, or in some cases exceed prewar tax records. Regardless, modern commentators agree the war was a man-made mortality disaster previously unknown in Europe. Estimates range from 4.5 to 8 million dead, most incurred after Sweden entered the war in 1630, the vast majority being civilians.

Field armies averaged 13,000 to 20,000 men, although many were considerably smaller, the largest being Alte Veste in 1632, where the combined total of the two forces was 70,000 to 85,000. When garrison and other Line of communication troops are included, the total deployed by both sides within Germany averaged 80,000 to 100,000 from 1618 to 1626, peaking at 250,000 in 1632, then falling to under 160,000 by 1648.

Casualty rates could be extremely high. Of 230 men conscripted for military service from the Swedish village of Bygdeå between 1621 and 1639, 215 are recorded as dead or missing, while another 5 returned home crippled. Historian Peter Wilson puts those killed or wounded in action at around 450,000. Since research shows disease increased that number by a factor of between two and three, it suggests a range for total military casualties of 1.3 to 1.8 million. Despite some concerns over his methodology, this is supported by Pitirim Sorokin, who puts total military deaths from combat and disease at around 2.1 million, half of which occurred between 1635 and 1648.

Local returns show only 3% of civilian deaths were due to military action, the major causes being starvation (12%), bubonic plague (64%), typhus (4%), and dysentery (5%). Poor harvests throughout the 1630s and repeated plundering of the same areas led to widespread famine, with reports of people eating grass, too weak to accept alms, or resorting to cannibalism. Although regular outbreaks of disease were common prior to 1618, their spread was accelerated by the influx of foreign soldiers, the shifting locations of battle fronts, and displacement of rural populations into already crowded cities. Soldiers transferred from Germany allegedly sparked the 1629–1631 Italian plague, described as the "worst mortality crisis to affect Italy during the early modern period". This resulted in some 280,000 deaths, with estimates of up to a million.

Modern historians generally agree that the German areas of the Holy Roman Empire experienced an overall population decline of roughly 40%, from 18 and 20 million in 1600 to between 11 and 13 million in 1650, and did not regain pre-war levels until 1750. Nearly 50% of these losses were incurred during the first period of Swedish intervention from 1630 to 1635. Bohemia and Moravia also saw a 27% population decline, from approximately 2.95 million in 1600 to 2.15 million in 1650. The high mortality rate was partly due to the reliance of all sides on foreign mercenaries, often unpaid and required to live off the land. Lack of a sense of 'shared community' resulted in atrocities such as the destruction of Magdeburg, in turn creating large numbers of refugees who were extremely susceptible to sickness and hunger. While flight saved lives in the short-term, in the long run it often proved catastrophic.

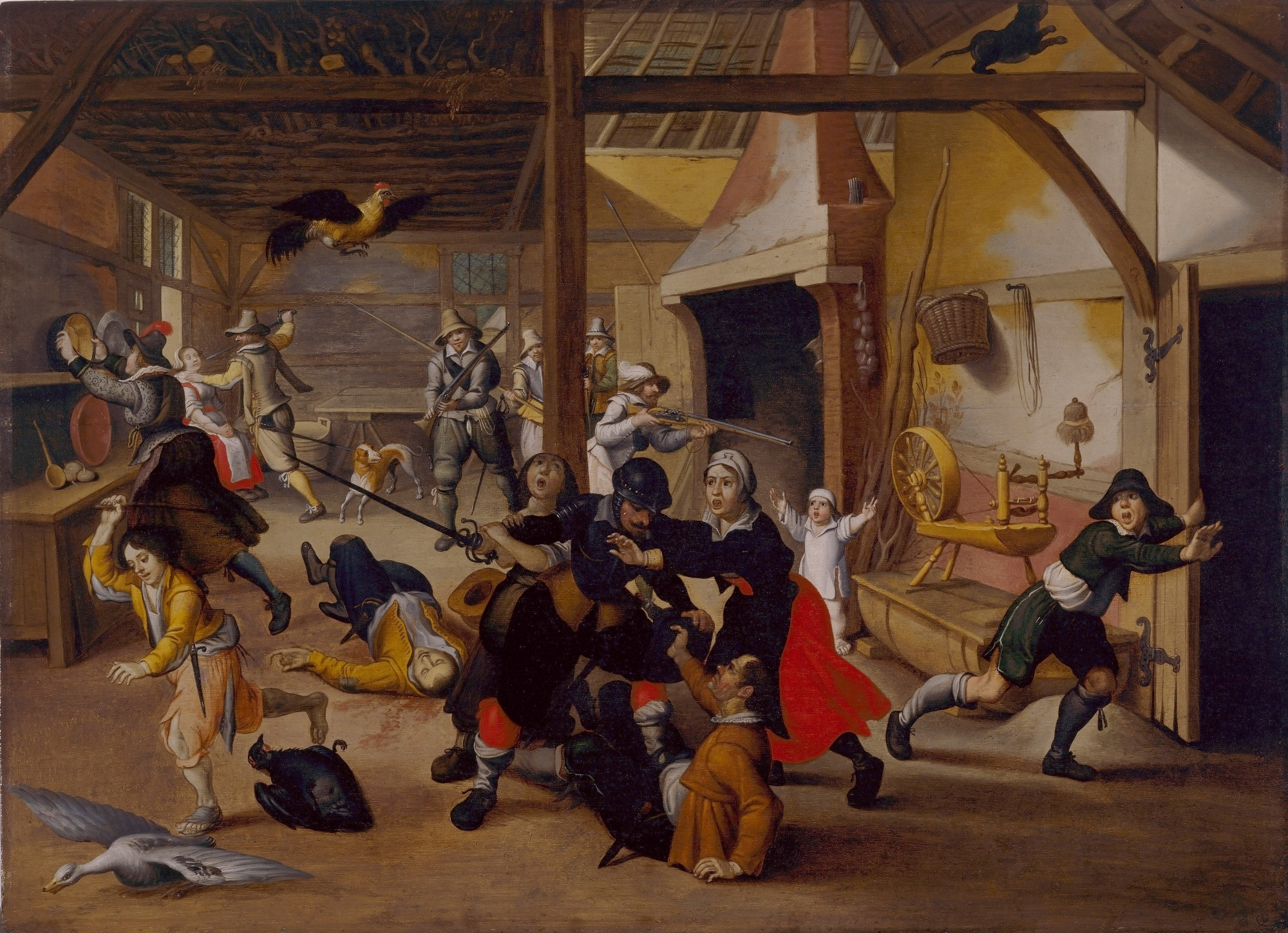
Soldiers plundering a farm

In 1940, historian Günther Franz published an analysis of data from across Germany covering the period from 1618 to 1648. Broadly confirmed by more recent work, he concluded about 40% of the civilian rural population became casualties, and 33% of the urban. These figures need to be read with care, since Franz calculated the absolute decline in pre and post-war populations, or 'total demographic loss'. They therefore include factors unrelated to death or disease, such as permanent migration to areas outside the Empire or lower birthrates, a common but less obvious impact of extended warfare. (Note: For example, the population of Augsburg fell from 48,000 in 1620 to 21,000 in 1650, which Franz portrays as a demographic loss of 27,000; however, many of these were not dead, but emigrated due to decline in trade) There were also wide regional variations, with areas of northwest Germany experiencing minimal loss of population, while those of Mecklenburg, Pomerania and Württemberg fell by nearly 50%.

Although some towns may have overstated their losses to avoid taxes, individual records confirm serious declines; from 1620 to 1650, the population of Munich fell from 22,000 to 17,000, that of Augsburg from 48,000 to 21,000. The financial impact is less clear; while the war caused short-term economic dislocation, especially in the period 1618 to 1623, overall it accelerated existing changes in trading patterns. It does not appear to have reversed ongoing macro-economic trends, such as the reduction of price differentials between regional markets, and a greater degree of market integration across Europe. The death toll may have improved living standards for the survivors; one study shows wages in Germany increased by 40% in real terms between 1603 and 1652.

== Military developments ==
Innovations made during the war, particularly by Gustavus, are considered part of the evolution known as the "Military Revolution", although whether tactics or technology were at the heart of these changes is still debated. Introduced by Maurice of Orange in the 1590s, these sought to increase infantry firepower by moving from massed columns to line formation. Gustavus further reduced the ten ranks used by Maurice to six, and increased the proportion of musketeers to pikemen. He also enhanced their firepower by providing each unit with quick-firing light artillery pieces on either flank. The best example of their application in battle was the victory over Tilly's traditionally organised army at Breitenfeld in September 1631.

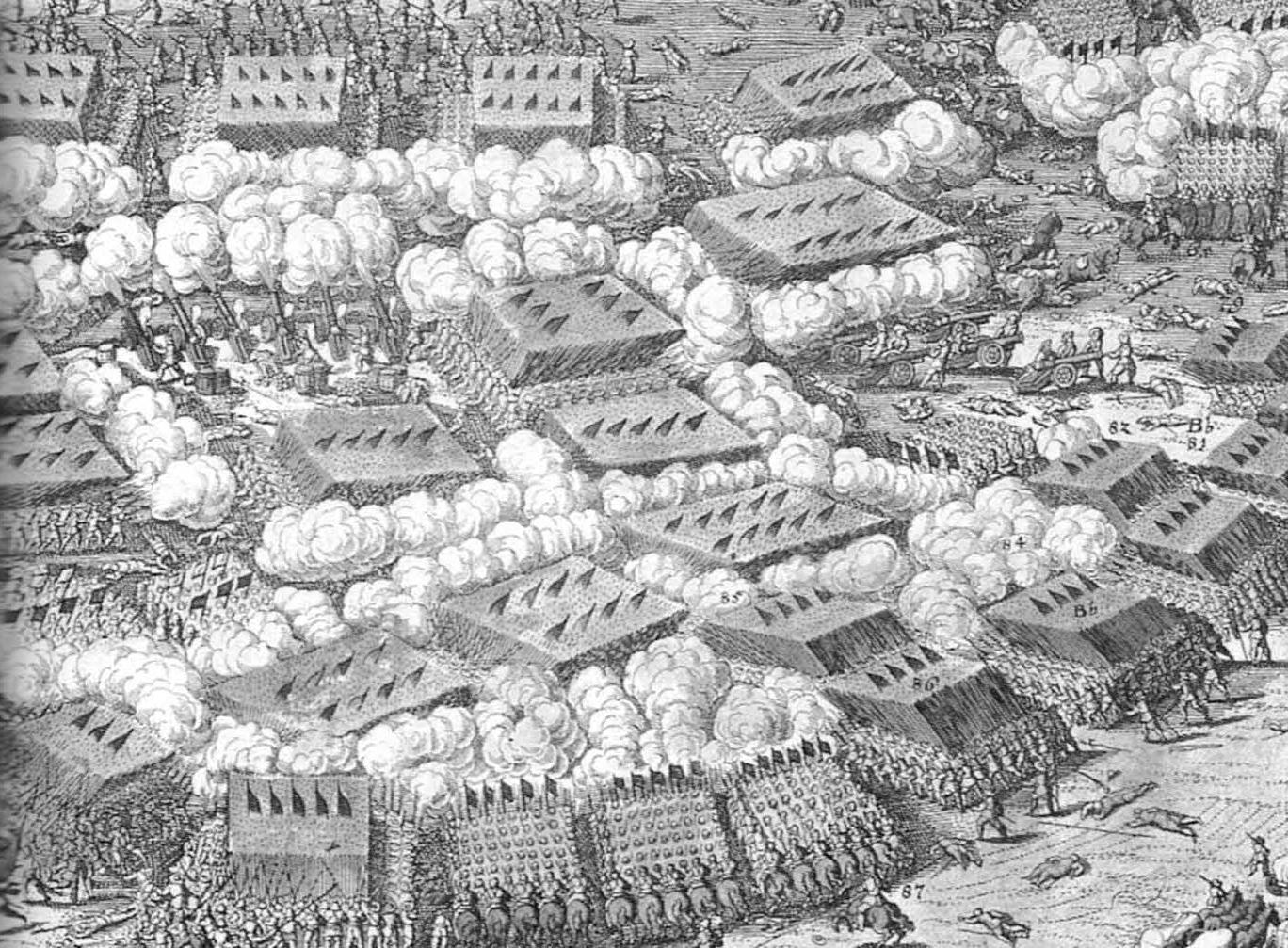
Breitenfeld 1631; Tilly's army (left) are deployed two companies deep, the Swedes (right) just one company deep.

However, line formations were often harder to co-ordinate, as demonstrated when the supposedly obsolete Spanish tercios defeated the Swedes at Nördlingen in 1634. Since they also lacked the offensive impact of columns, Gustavus compensated by requiring his cavalry to be far more aggressive, often employing Finnish Hakkapeliitta as shock troops. However, even the Swedes used columns on occasion, notably the failed assault at Alte Veste in September 1632. The line versus column debate continued into the early 19th century, and both were employed during the Napoleonic Wars.

Such tactics needed professional soldiers, who could retain formation, reload and fire disciplined salvos while under attack, as well as the use of standardised weapons. The first half of the 17th century saw the publication of numerous instruction manuals showing the movements required, thirty-two for pikemen and forty-two for musketeers. In theory, it took up to six months to train infantry to operate in this way, but in reality many went into battle with far less experience. It also placed greater responsibility on junior officers who provided the vital links between senior commanders and the tactical unit. One of the first military schools designed to produce such men was set up at Siegen in 1616, and others soon followed.

On the other hand, strategic thinking failed to develop at the same pace. Historian Jeremy Black claims most campaigns were primarily concerned with supplying their troops, rather than focused strategic objectives. The disconnect between military and diplomatic goals helps explain why the war lasted so long, and peace proved so elusive. When fighting officially ended in 1648, there were still over 150,000 troops within the Empire, small numbers by modern standards, but unprecedented at the time. Most 17th-century states could not finance armies of this size for extended periods, forcing them to depend on "contributions" from areas they passed through.

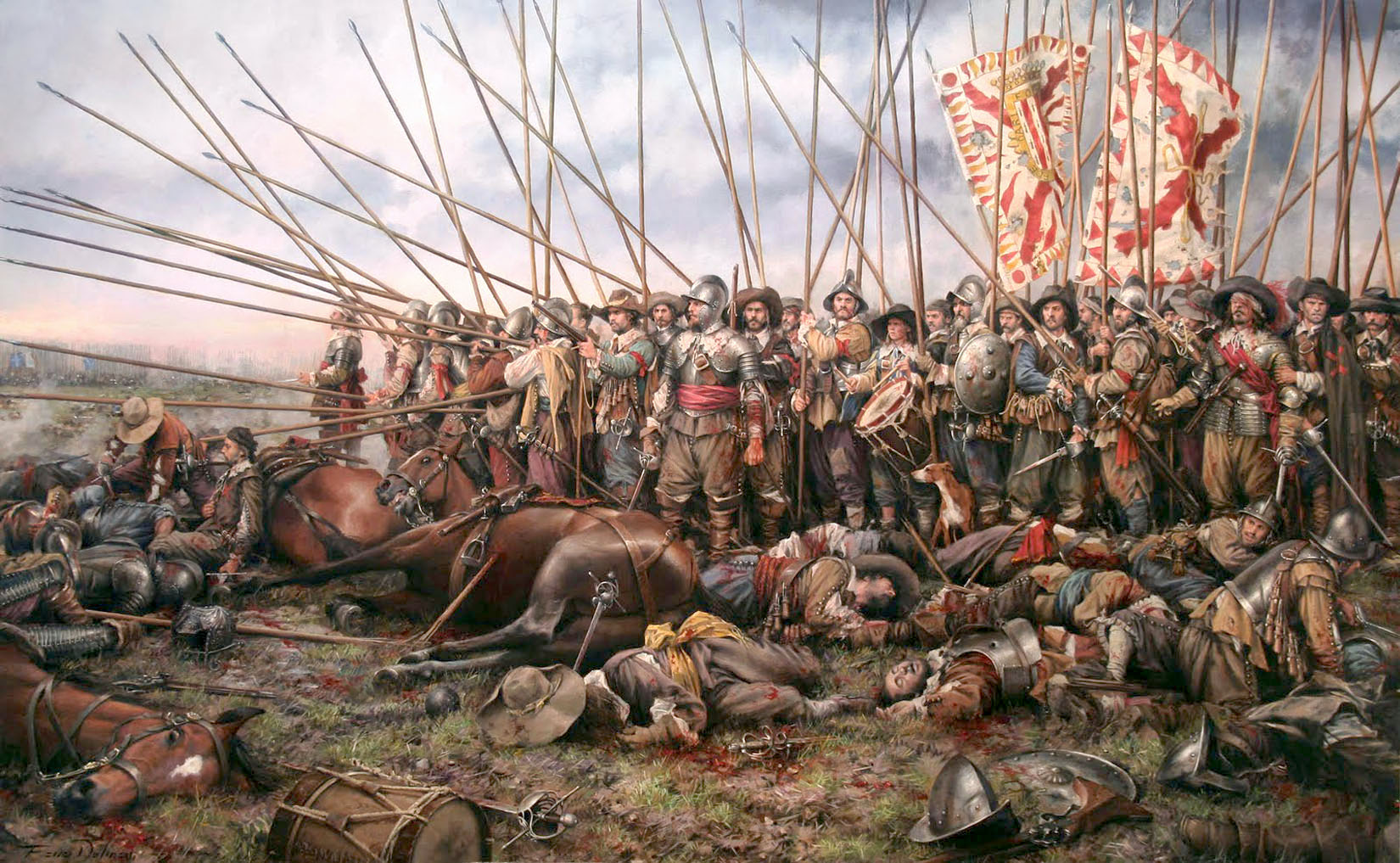
The Battle of Rocroi (1643) is often seen as the end of the battlefield supremacy of the tercios.

Supplies thus became the limiting factor in planning campaigns, a problem that grew more acute as the war progressed. Armies became smaller, with a greater emphasis on cavalry that could cover greater distances and move faster, rather than slow moving infantry. Poor infrastructure also required commanders to stay close to rivers, then the primary means of bulk transportation, and meant they could not move too far from their main bases. The result was in "armies devoid of intelligible political objectives...degenerating into travelling armed mobs, living in a symbiotic relationship with the countryside they passed through". This focus on supplying the troops meant military operations often conflicted with the political aims of their employers. The devastation inflicted in 1628 and 1629 by Imperial troops on their allies in Brandenburg and Saxony was a major factor in the latter backing Swedish intervention.

Finally, some commentators argue that while the Thirty Years' War certainly played a role in accelerating the development of new tactics and technology, the need to fund, supply, and direct permanent armies for extended periods across wide-ranging theatres was of greater significance. This required much more sophisticated mechanisms and led to the transfer of organised violence from "contractor" generals like Wallenstein or Mansfeld to nation-states. In this sense, the truly "revolutionary" aspect of the Military Revolution was less about the tactics and technology used by soldiers, and more about the institutions required to support them.

== Social and cultural impact ==
The breakdown of social order caused by the war was often more significant and longer lasting than the immediate damage. The collapse of local government created landless peasants, who banded together to protect themselves from the soldiers of both sides, and led to widespread rebellions in Upper Austria, Bavaria and Brandenburg. Soldiers devastated one area before moving on, leaving large tracts of land empty of people and changing the ecosystem. Food shortages were worsened by an explosion in the rodent population, while Bavaria was overrun by wolves in the winter of 1638, and its crops destroyed by packs of wild pigs the following spring.

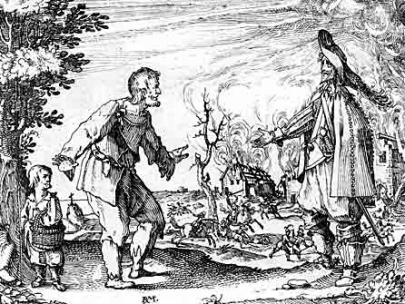
A peasant begs for mercy in front of his burning farm; by the 1630s, being caught in the open by soldiers from either side was "tantamount to a death sentence".

Contemporaries spoke of a "frenzy of despair" as people sought to make sense of the relentless and often random bloodshed unleashed by the war. Attributed by religious authorities to divine retribution, attempts to identify a supernatural cause led to a series of witch-hunts, starting in Franconia in 1626, then quickly spreading to other parts of Germany. They began in the Bishopric of Würzburg, an area with a history of such events going back to 1616 and now re-ignited by Bishop von Ehrenberg, a devout Catholic eager to assert the church's authority in his territories. By the time he died in 1631, over 900 people from all levels of society had been executed.

The Bamberg witch trials, held in the nearby Bishopric of Bamberg from 1626 to 1631, claimed over one thousand lives; in 1629, 274 died in the Eichstätt witch trials, plus another 50 in the adjacent Duchy of Palatinate-Neuburg. Elsewhere, persecution followed imperial military success, expanding into Baden and the Palatinate following their reconquest by Tilly, then into the Rhineland. However, the extent to which they were symptomatic of the impact of the conflict on society is debatable, since many took place in areas relatively untouched by the war. Concerned their brutality would discredit the Counter-Reformation, Ferdinand ensured active persecution largely ended by 1630.

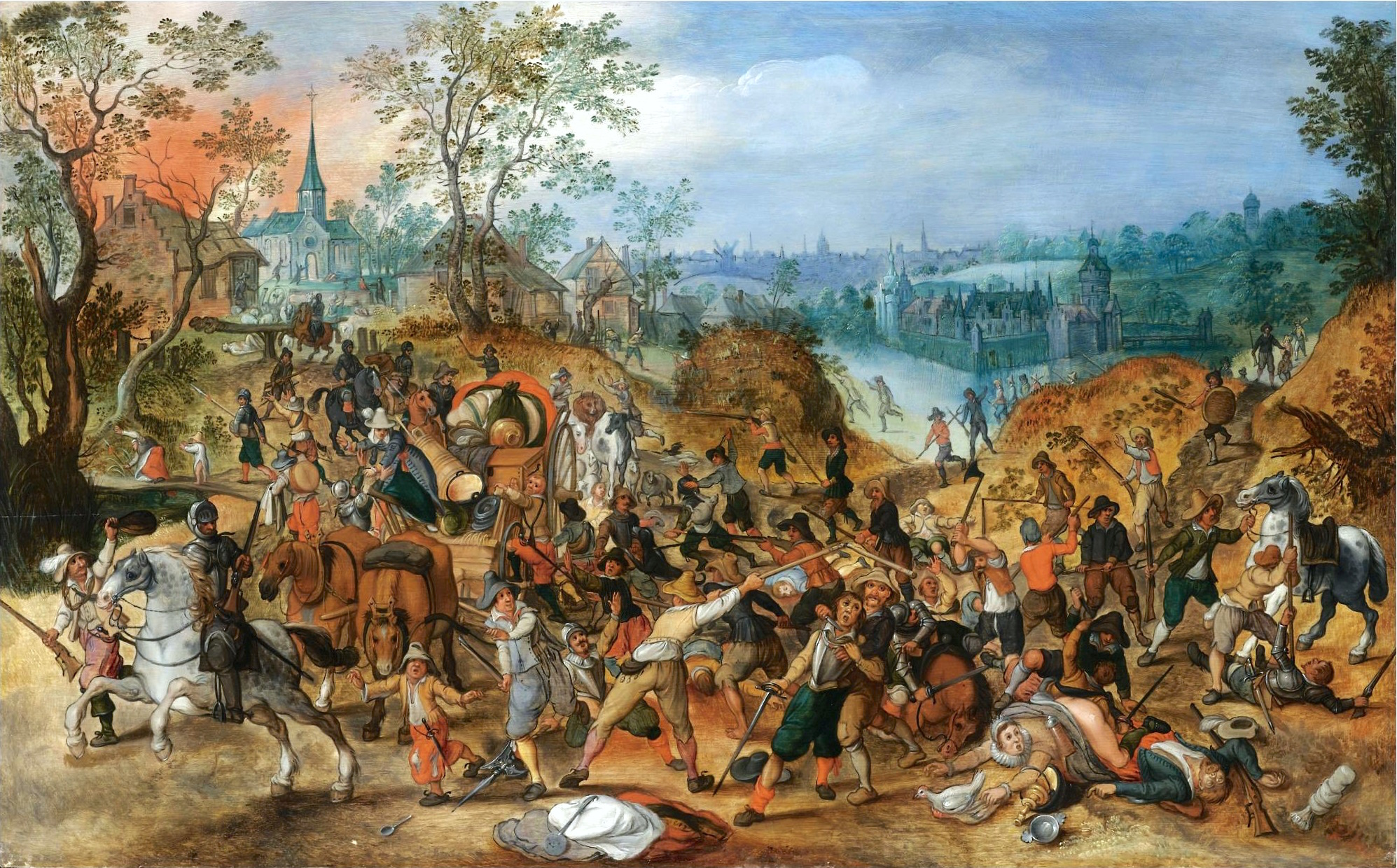
Local people attacking mercenaries and their entourage outside a small town, by Sebastiaen Vrancx

Although the war caused immense destruction, it has also been credited with sparking a revival in German literature, including the creation of societies dedicated to "purging foreign elements" from the German language. One example is Simplicius Simplicissimus, a picaresque novel written by Hans Jakob Christoffel von Grimmelshausen in 1668, providing a realistic portrayal of a soldier's life based on his own experience, which is verified by other sources. Other less famous examples include the diaries of Peter Hagendorf, a participant in the Sack of Magdeburg whose descriptions of the everyday brutalities of the war remain compelling.

For German, and to a lesser extent Czech writers, the war was remembered as a defining moment of national trauma, the 18th-century poet and playwright Friedrich Schiller being one of many to use it in their work. Variously known as the 'Great German War,' 'Great War', or 'Great Schism', for 19th- and early 20th-century German nationalists it showed the dangers of a divided Germany and was used to justify the creation of the German Empire in 1871, as well as the Greater Germanic Reich envisaged by the Nazis. Bertolt Brecht used it as the backdrop for his 1939 anti-war play Mother Courage and Her Children, while its enduring cultural resonance is illustrated by the novel Tyll; written by Austro-German author Daniel Kehlmann and also set during the war, it was nominated for the 2020 Booker Prize.

== Political consequences ==
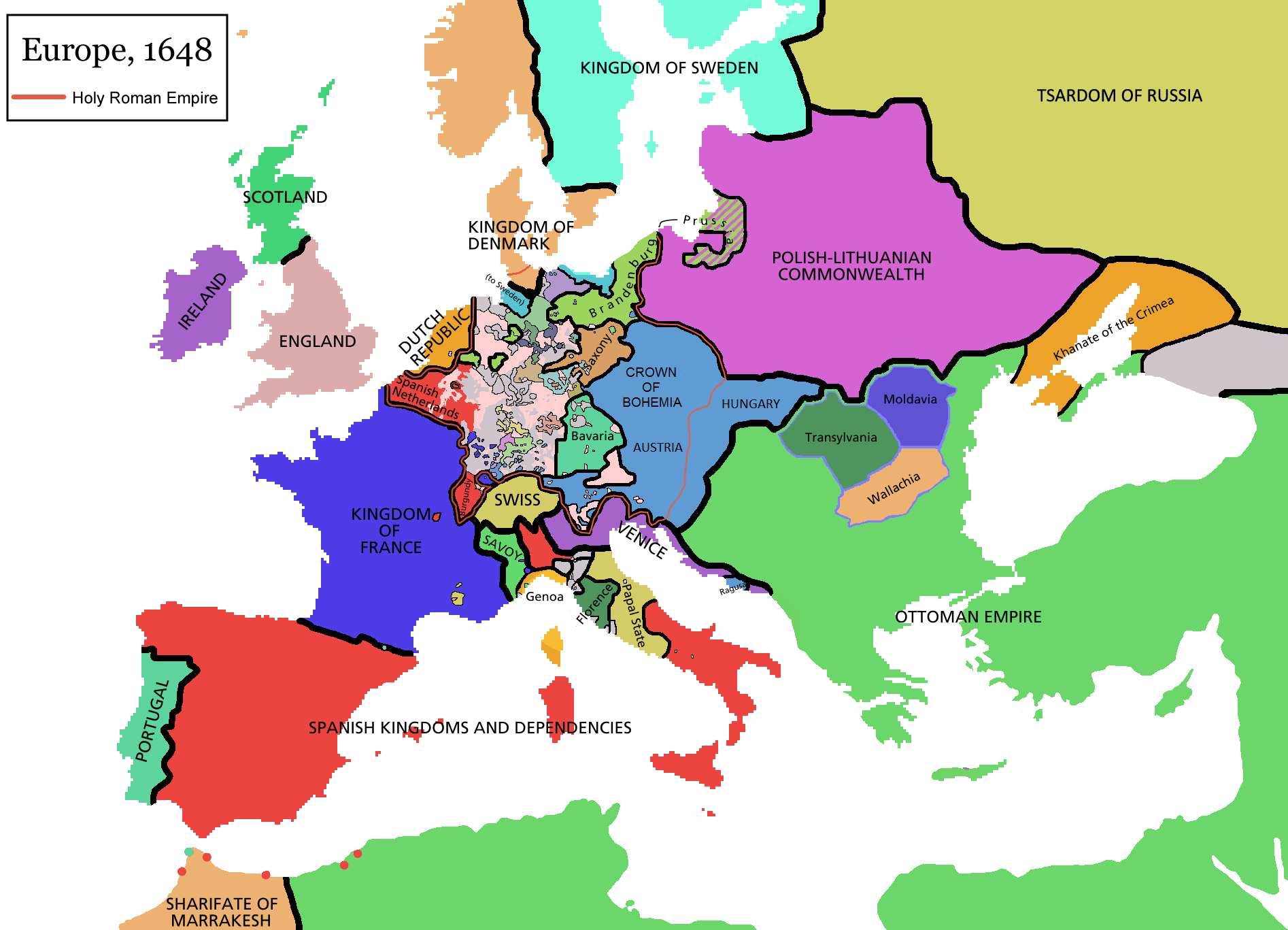
Europe after the Peace of Westphalia, 1648

The Peace of Westphalia reconfirmed "German liberties", ending Habsburg attempts to convert the Holy Roman Empire into a centralised state similar to Spain. Over the next 50 years, Bavaria, Brandenburg-Prussia, Saxony, and others increasingly pursued their own policies, while Sweden gained a permanent foothold in the Empire. Despite these setbacks, the Habsburg lands suffered less from the war than many others. They also became a far more coherent geographical bloc with the addition of Bohemia, and the restoration of Catholicism throughout their territories.

By laying the foundations of the modern nation state, the Peace of Westphalia changed the relationship between rulers and ruled, many of whom previously had multiple political and religious allegiances. After 1648, they were now understood to be subject first and foremost to the laws and edicts of their respective state authority, not the claims of any other entity, either religious or secular. This made it easier to levy national forces loyal to the state and its leader; one lesson learned from Wallenstein and the Swedish invasion was the need for their own permanent armies, and German society became far more militarised.

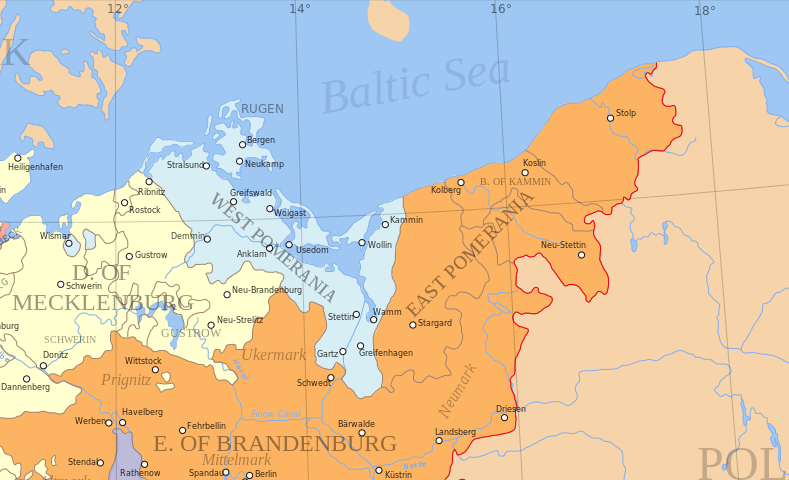
Swedish sovereignty over Western Pomerania (in blue) was confirmed in 1653, and finally ended only in 1815.

For Sweden, the war had established the kingdom as a major force in Northern Europe, but the direct benefits of the Peace of Westphalia ultimately proved short-lived. Unlike French gains, which were incorporated into France, Swedish territories remained part of the Empire, and they became members of the Lower and Upper Saxon kreis. While this provided both seats and influence in the Imperial Diet, it also brought Sweden into direct conflict with Brandenburg–Prussia and Saxony, their competitors in Pomerania. The income from their German possessions was relatively minor, and although parts of Pomerania remained Swedish until 1815, much of it was ceded to Prussia in 1679 and 1720.

France arguably gained more from the conflict than any other power, and by 1648, most of Richelieu's objectives had been achieved. These included separation of the Spanish and Austrian Habsburgs, expansion of the French frontier into the Holy Roman Empire, and an end to Spanish military supremacy in Northern Europe. Although the Franco–Spanish war continued until 1659, the Peace of Westphalia allowed Louis XIV to begin replacing Spain as the predominant European power.

While religion remained a divisive political issue in many countries, the Thirty Years' War is arguably the last major European conflict where it was a primary driver. Future religious conflicts were either internal, such as the Camisards revolt in southern France, or relatively minor, like the 1712 Toggenburg War. The war created the outlines of a Europe that persisted until 1815 and beyond, most significantly the nation-state of France, along with the start of a split between Germany and a separate Austro-Hungarian bloc.

== See also ==
- Thirty Years' War outside Europe
- Timeline of the Thirty Years' War

== Sources ==
- A. Mears, John (1988). "The Thirty Years' War, the "General Crisis," and the Origins of a Standing Professional Army in the Habsburg Monarchy". Central European History. 21 (2): 122–41. doi:10.1017/S0008938900012711. ISSN 0008-9389. JSTOR 4546115. S2CID 144482963.
- Alfani, Guido; Percoco, Marco (2019). "Plague and long-term development: the lasting effects of the 1629–30 epidemic on the Italian cities". The Economic History Review. 72 (4): 1175–1201. doi:10.1111/ehr.12652. ISSN 1468-0289. S2CID 131730725.
- Algra, Hendrik; Algra, Ale (1956). Dispereert niet: Twintig eeuwen historie van de Nederlanden [Despair not: Twenty centuries of the history of the Netherlands] (in Dutch). T. Wever. Archived from the original on 23 February 2023.
- Backstrom, Olli (2023). Military Revolution and the Thirty Years War 1618–1648 - Aspects of Institutional Change and Decline. HUP. ISBN 978-952-369-092-9.
- Baramova, Maria (2014). Asbach, Olaf; Schröder, Peter (eds.). Non-splendid isolation: the Ottoman Empire and the Thirty Years War in The Ashgate Research Companion to the Thirty Years' War. Routledge. ISBN 978-1-4094-0629-7.
- Bassett, Richard (2015). For God and Kaiser; the Imperial Austrian Army. Yale University Press. ISBN 978-0-300-17858-6.
- Bely, Lucien (2014). Asbach, Olaf; Schröder, Peter (eds.). France and the Thirty Years War in The Ashgate Research Companion to the Thirty Years' War. Ashgate. ISBN 978-1-4094-0629-7.
- Van Nimwegen, Olaf (2014). Asbach, Olaf; Schröder, Peter (eds.). The Dutch–Spanish War in the Low Countries 1621–1648 in The Ashgate Research Companion to the Thirty Years' War. Ashgate. ISBN 978-1-4094-0629-7.
- Bireley, Robert (1976). "The Peace of Prague (1635) and the Counterreformation in Germany". The Journal of Modern History. 48 (1): 31–69. doi:10.1086/241519. S2CID 143376778.
- Bonney, Richard (2002). The Thirty Years' War 1618–1648. Osprey Publishing.
- Briggs, Robin (1996). Witches & Neighbors: The Social And Cultural Context of European Witchcraft. Viking. ISBN 978-0-670-83589-8.
- Brzezinski, Richard (2001). Lützen 1632: Climax of the Thirty Years War: The Clash of Empires. Osprey. ISBN 978-1-85532-552-4.
- Chandler, David (1990). The Art of Warfare in the Age of Marlborough. Spellmount Publishers Ltd. ISBN 978-0-946771-42-4.
- Clodfelter, Micheal (2008). Warfare and Armed Conflicts: A Statistical Encyclopedia of Casualty and Other Figures, 1492–2015 (2017 ed.). McFarland. ISBN 978-0-7864-7470-7.
- Costa, Fernando Dores (2005). "Interpreting the Portuguese War of Restoration (1641–1668) in a European Context". Journal of Portuguese History. 3 (1).
- Cramer, Kevin (2007). The Thirty Years' War & German Memory in the Nineteenth Century. University of Nebraska. ISBN 978-0-8032-1562-7.
- Croxton, Derek (2013). The Last Christian Peace: The Congress of Westphalia as A Baroque Event. Palgrave Macmillan. ISBN 978-1-137-33332-2.
- Croxton, Derek (1998). "A Territorial Imperative? The Military Revolution, Strategy and Peacemaking in the Thirty Years War". War in History. 5 (3): 253–279. doi:10.1177/096834459800500301. JSTOR 26007296. S2CID 159915965.
- Davenport, Frances Gardiner (1917). European Treaties Bearing on the History of the United States and Its Dependencies (2014 ed.). Literary Licensing. ISBN 978-1-4981-4446-9.
- Duffy, Christopher (1995). Siege Warfare: The Fortress in the Early Modern World 1494–1660. Routledge. ISBN 978-0-415-14649-4.
- Ferretti, Giuliano (2014). "La politique italienne de la France et le duché de Savoie au temps de Richelieu; Franco-Savoyard Italian policy in the time of Richelieu". Dix-septième Siècle (in French). 1 (262): 7. doi:10.3917/dss.141.0007.
- Friehs, Julia Teresa. "Art and the Thirty Years' War". Die Welt der Habsburger. Archived from the original on 8 August 2021.
- Frost, Robert I (1994). "Book Review Salm, Hubert Armeefinanzierung im Dreißigjährigen Krieg. Der Niederrheinisch-Westfälische Reichskreis 1635–1650 (Münster, 1990) and Ernst, Hildegard, Madrid und Wien 1632–1637. Politik und Finanzen in den Beziehungen zwischen Philipp IV. und Ferdinand II. (Münster, 1991)". War in History. 1: 102–105. doi:10.1177/096834459400100109.
- Hays, J. N. (2005). Epidemics and pandemics; their impacts on human history. ABC-CLIO. ISBN 978-1-85109-658-9.
- Gnanaprakasar, Nalloor Swamy (2003). Critical History of Jaffna – The Tamil Era. Asian Educational Services. ISBN 978-81-206-1686-8.
- Gutmann, Myron P. (1988). "The Origins of the Thirty Years' War". Journal of Interdisciplinary History. 18 (4): 749–770. doi:10.2307/204823. JSTOR 204823.
- Hanlon, Gregory (2016). The Twilight Of A Military Tradition: Italian Aristocrats And European Conflicts, 1560–1800. Routledge. ISBN 978-1-138-15827-6.
- Hayden, J. Michael (1973). "Continuity in the France of Henry IV and Louis XIII: French Foreign Policy, 1598–1615". The Journal of Modern History. 45 (1): 1–23. doi:10.1086/240888. JSTOR 1877591. S2CID 144914347.
- Helfferich, Tryntje (2009). The Thirty Years War: A Documentary History. Hackett Publishing Co, Inc. ISBN 978-0-87220-939-8.
- Heitz, Gerhard; Rischer, Henning (1995). Geschichte in Daten. Mecklenburg-Vorpommern; History in data; Mecklenburg-Western Pomerania (in German). Koehler&Amelang. ISBN 3-7338-0195-4.
- Israel, Jonathan (1995a). Spain in the Low Countries, (1635–1643) in Spain, Europe and the Atlantic: Essays in Honour of John H. Elliott. Cambridge University Press. ISBN 978-0-521-47045-2.
- Israel, Jonathan (1995b). The Dutch Republic: Its Rise, Greatness, and Fall 1477–1806. Oxford: Clarendon Press. ISBN 0-19-873072-1.
- Jensen, Gary F. (2007). The Path of the Devil: Early Modern Witch Hunts. Rowman & Littlefield. ISBN 978-0-7425-4697-4.
- Kamen, Henry (2003). Spain's Road to Empire. Allen Lane. ISBN 978-0-14-028528-4.
- Kohn, George (1995). Encyclopedia of Plague and Pestilence: From Ancient Times to the Present. Facts on file. ISBN 978-0-8160-2758-3.
- Lee, Stephen (2001). The Thirty Years War (Lancaster Pamphlets). Routledge. ISBN 978-0-415-26862-2.
- Lesaffer, Randall (1997). "The Westphalia Peace Treaties and the Development of the Tradition of Great European Peace Settlements prior to 1648". Grotiana. 18 (1): 71–95. doi:10.1163/187607597X00064.
- Levy, Jack S (1983). War in the Modern Great Power System: 1495 to 1975. University Press of Kentucky.
- Lockhart, Paul D (2007). Denmark, 1513–1660: the rise and decline of a Renaissance monarchy. Oxford University Press. ISBN 978-0-19-927121-4.
- Maland, David (1980). Europe at War, 1600–50. Palgrave Macmillan. ISBN 978-0-333-23446-4.
- McMurdie, Justin (2014). The Thirty Years' War: Examining the Origins and Effects of Corpus Christianum's Defining Conflict (MA thesis). George Fox University. Archived from the original on 7 April 2022.
- Milton, Patrick; Axworthy, Michael; Simms, Brendan (2018). Towards The Peace Congress of Münster and Osnabrück (1643–1648) and the Westphalian Order (1648–1806) in "A Westphalia for the Middle East". C Hurst & Co Publishers Ltd. ISBN 978-1-78738-023-3.
- Mitchell, Andrew Joseph (2005). Religion, revolt, and creation of regional identity in Catalonia, 1640–1643 (PhD thesis). Ohio State University. Archived from the original on 17 April 2023.
- Murdoch, Steve (2000). Britain, Denmark-Norway and the House of Stuart 1603–1660. Tuckwell. ISBN 978-1-86232-182-3.
- Murdoch, Steve; Zickermann, Kathrin; Marks, Adam (2012). "The Battle of Wittstock 1636: Conflicting Reports on a Swedish Victory in Germany". Northern Studies. 43: 71–109. Archived from the original on 8 July 2022.
- Murdoch, Steve; Grosjean, Alexia (2014). Alexander Leslie and the Scottish generals of the Thirty Years' War, 1618–1648. Routledge. ISBN 978-1-84893-467-2.
- Nicklisch, Nicole; Ramsthaler, Frank; Meller, Harald; Others (2017). "The face of war: Trauma analysis of a mass grave from the Battle of Lützen (1632)". PLOS ONE. 12 (5) e0178252. Bibcode:2017PLoSO..1278252N. doi:10.1371/journal.pone.0178252. PMC 5439951. PMID 28542491.
- Norrhem, Svante (2019). Mercenary Swedes; French subsidies to Sweden 1631–1796. Translated by Merton, Charlotte. Nordic Academic Press. ISBN 978-91-88661-82-1.
- O'Connell, Daniel Patrick (1968). Richelieu. Weidenfeld & Nicolson.
- O'Connell, Robert L (1990). Of Arms and Men: A History of War, Weapons, and Aggression. OUP. ISBN 978-0-19-505359-3.
- Outram, Quentin (2001). "The Socio-Economic Relations of Warfare and the Military Mortality Crises of the Thirty Years' War" (PDF). Medical History. 45 (2): 151–184. doi:10.1017/S0025727300067703. PMC 1044352. PMID 11373858. Archived (PDF) from the original on 25 June 2022.
- Outram, Quentin (2002). "The Demographic impact of early modern warfare". Social Science History. 26 (2): 245–272. doi:10.1215/01455532-26-2-245 (inactive 22 September 2025).
- Parker, Geoffrey (2008). "Crisis and Catastrophe: The global crisis of the seventeenth century reconsidered". American Historical Review. 113 (4): 1053–1079. doi:10.1086/ahr.113.4.1053.
- Parker, Geoffrey (1976). "The 'Military Revolution', 1560–1660 – a Myth?". The Journal of Modern History. 48 (2): 195–214. doi:10.1086/241429. JSTOR 1879826. S2CID 143661971.
- Parker, Geoffrey (1997) [1984]. The Thirty Years' War. Routledge. ISBN 978-0-415-12883-4. (with several contributors)
- Parker, Geoffrey (2004) [1972]. Army of Flanders and the Spanish Road, 1567–1659: The Logistics of Spanish Victory and Defeat in the Low Countries' Wars. CUP. ISBN 978-0-521-54392-7.
- Parrott, David (2001). Richelieu's Army: War, Government and Society in France, 1624–1642. Cambridge University Press. ISBN 978-0-521-79209-7.
- Pazos, Conde Miguel (2011). "El tradado de Nápoles. El encierro del príncipe Juan Casimiro y la leva de Polacos de Medina de las Torres (1638–1642): The Treaty of Naples; the imprisonment of John Casimir and the Polish Levy of Medina de las Torres". Studia Histórica, Historia Moderna (in Spanish). 33.
- Pfister, Ulrich; Riedel, Jana; Uebele, Martin (2012). "Real Wages and the Origins of Modern Economic Growth in Germany, 16th to 19th Centuries" (PDF). European Historical Economics Society. 17. Archived from the original (PDF) on 11 May 2022.
- Porshnev, Boris Fedorovich (1995). Dukes, Paul (ed.). Muscovy and Sweden in the Thirty Years' War, 1630–1635. Cambridge University Press. ISBN 978-0-521-45139-0.
- Pursell, Brennan C. (2003). The Winter King: Frederick V of the Palatinate and the Coming of the Thirty Years' War. Ashgate. ISBN 978-0-7546-3401-0.
- Ryan, E.A. (1948). "Catholics and the Peace of Westphalia" (PDF). Theological Studies. 9 (4): 590–599. doi:10.1177/004056394800900407. S2CID 170555324. Archived from the original (PDF) on 4 March 2016.
- Schmidt, Burghart; Richefort, Isabelle (2006). "Les relations entre la France et les villes hanséatiques de Hambourg, Brême et Lübeck: Moyen Age-XIXe siècle; Relations between France and the Hanseatic ports of Hamburg, Bremen and Lubeck from the Middle Ages to the 19th century". Direction des Archives, Ministère des affaires étrangères (in French).
- Schulze, Max-Stefan; Volckart, Oliver (2019). "The Long-term Impact of the Thirty Years War: What Grain Price Data Reveal" (PDF). Economic History. Archived (PDF) from the original on 28 July 2021.
- Sharman, J.C (2018). "Myths of military revolution: European expansion and Eurocentrism". European Journal of International Relations. 24 (3): 491–513. doi:10.1177/1354066117719992. hdl:10072/385454. S2CID 148771791.
- Spielvogel, Jackson (2017). Western Civilisation. Wadsworth Publishing. ISBN 978-1-305-95231-7.
- Storrs, Christopher (2006). The Resilience of the Spanish Monarchy 1665–1700. OUP. ISBN 978-0-19-924637-3.
- Stutler, James Oliver (2014). Lords of War: Maximilian I of Bavaria and the Institutions of Lordship in the Catholic League Army, 1619–1626 (PDF) (PhD thesis). Duke University. hdl:10161/8754. Archived from the original (PDF) on 28 July 2021.
- Sutherland, NM (1992). "The Origins of the Thirty Years War and the Structure of European Politics". The English Historical Review. CVII (CCCCXXIV): 587–625. doi:10.1093/ehr/cvii.ccccxxiv.587.
- Talbott, Siobhan (2021). "'Causing misery and suffering miserably': Representations of the Thirty Years' War in Literature and History". Literature & History. 30 (1): 3–25. doi:10.1177/03061973211007353. S2CID 234347328.
- Thion, Stephane (2008). French Armies of the Thirty Years' War 1618-1648 (2014 ed.). Helion Books. ISBN 978-1-80451-448-1.
- Thornton, John (2016). "The Kingdom of Kongo and the Thirty Years' War". Journal of World History. 27 (2): 189–213. doi:10.1353/jwh.2016.0100. JSTOR 43901848. S2CID 163706878.
- Thornton, John K. (26 March 2020). A History of West Central Africa to 1850. Cambridge University Press. ISBN 978-1-108-88292-7.
- Trevor-Roper, Hugh (2001) [1967]. The Crisis of the Seventeenth Century: Religion, the Reformation and Social Change. Liberty Fund. ISBN 978-0-86597-278-0.
- Van Gelderen, Martin (2002). Republicanism and Constitutionalism in Early Modern Europe: A Shared European Heritage Volume I. Cambridge University Press. ISBN 978-0-521-80203-1.
- Van Groesen, Michiel (2011). "Lessons Learned: The Second Dutch Conquest of Brazil and the Memory of the First". Colonial Latin American Review. 20 (2): 167–193. doi:10.1080/10609164.2011.585770. S2CID 218574377.
- Van Nimwegen, Olaf (2010). The Dutch Army and the Military Revolutions, 1588–1688. Boydell Press. ISBN 978-1-84383-575-2.
- Wedgwood, C.V. (1938). The Thirty Years War (2005 ed.). New York Review of Books. ISBN 978-1-59017-146-2.
- White, Matthew (2012). The Great Big Book of Horrible Things. W.W. Norton & Co. ISBN 978-0-393-08192-3.
- Wilson, Peter H. (2009). Europe's Tragedy: A History of the Thirty Years War. Allen Lane. ISBN 978-0-7139-9592-3.
- Wilson, Peter H. (2018). Lützen: Great Battles Series. Oxford: Oxford University Press. ISBN 978-0-19-964254-0.
- Wilson, Peter (2008). "The Causes of the Thirty Years War 1618–48". The English Historical Review. 123 (502): 554–586. doi:10.1093/ehr/cen160. JSTOR 20108541.
- Zaller, Robert (1974). "'Interest of State': James I and the Palatinate". Albion: A Quarterly Journal Concerned with British Studies. 6 (2): 144–175. doi:10.2307/4048141. JSTOR 4048141.
