= Treaty of Wismar =

1636 treaty between France and Sweden

The Treaty of Wismar was signed on 20 March 1636 by France and Sweden at Wismar in Mecklenburg. The accord was negotiated for Sweden by Lord High Chancellor Axel Oxenstierna, Count of Södermöre who was regent for Christina, Queen of Sweden. The signatories agreed to unite forces against the Habsburgs, with France attacking on the left bank of the Rhine River and Sweden fighting in Silesia and Bohemia. The Treaty of Wismar was eventually ratified in 1638 by the Treaty of Hamburg.

== See also ==
- List of treaties

== Related reading ==
- Parker, Geoffrey; Adams, Simon (1997) The Thirty Years' War (Routledge. 2 ed.) ISBN 0415128838
- Tryntje Helfferich, translator (2009) The Thirty Years War: A Documentary History (Hackett Publishing Company, Inc.) ISBN 978-0872209398
