= Johann Philipp Kratz von Scharffenstein =

German nobleman and field marshal

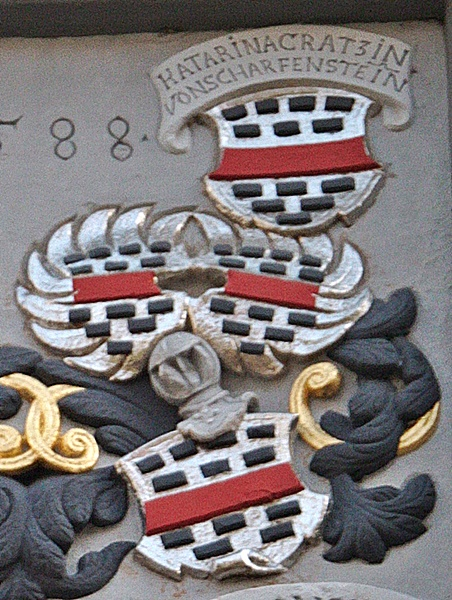
- Kratz von Scharffenstein's coat of arms
- Born: 1585
- Died: 26 July 1635 (aged 49–50) Vienna, Holy Roman Empire
- Allegiance: Catholic League; Holy Roman Empire (Kingdom of France) France; Sweden
- Service years: 1620–1635
- Rank: Field marshal
- Conflicts: Thirty Years' War; Battle of White Mountain; Palatinate campaign; Siege of Breda; Battle of Dessau Bridge; Battle of Bamberg; Battle of Rain; Battle of Nördlingen

Johann Philipp Kratz von Scharffenstein (1585 – 26 July 1635) was a German nobleman and field marshal, who fought during the course of the Thirty Years' War. He served with distinction in forces of both the Catholic League and Holy Roman Empire. His poor relationship with the Imperial generalissimo Albrecht von Wallenstein frustrated his plan of becoming the supreme commander of the League's forces. Embittered by this he defected to Sweden, where he attained the rank of field marshal. He was captured at the Battle of Nördlingen in 1634 and executed for treason a year later.

== Biography ==
Johann Philipp Count of Scharffenstein, Freiherr of Riesenberg was born in 1585. At the outbreak of the Thirty Years' War, Scharffenstein served in the army of the Bishopric of Worms, which was part of the armed forces of the Catholic League. On 8 November 1620, he commanded a regiment of heavy cavalry at the Battle of White Mountain. Positioned on the flank of the Catholic infantry tercios he managed to contain the cavalry charge of Christian I, Prince of Anhalt-Bernburg. In the meantime elements of the Bohemian infantry fled the battlefield without even engaging the enemy, leading to a Catholic-Holy Roman victory. Scharffenstein's actions during the battle inspired several folksongs. Between 1621 and 1623, he fought under Johann Tserclaes, Count of Tilly against the remnants of the rebel forces headed by Ernst von Mansfeld, Christian the Younger of Brunswick and Georg Friedrich, Margrave of Baden-Durlach in the Palatinate campaign. After the conclusion of the campaign he joined the ranks of the Holy Roman army, departing for the Netherlands where he participated in Spinola's Siege of Breda in 1624. Following the Danish intervention into the war he returned to Germany, commanding the Imperial cavalry in the Battle of Dessau Bridge on 25 April 1626. In the same year, he quit Imperial service over an argument with Imperial generalissimo Albrecht von Wallenstein, possibly over the dismissal of Raimbaut XIII of Collalto. Deeply offended he entered the service of France. Not wanting to strain his relationship with the Holy Roman Emperor Ferdinand II by whose grace he received estates in Bohemia, Scharffenstein left the French army shortly before the two states fought in the War of the Mantuan Succession. After Wallenstein's dismissal, Scharffenstein returned into the Imperial army, serving in lower Germany. 1630 was marked by the Swedish intervention in the Thirty Years' War, the Swedes swept through Pomerania and Brandenburg meeting little resistance. Scharffenstein was then appointed to the position of the garrison commander of the Landsberg an der Warthe, repealing a Swedish assault on the city in January 1631. Scharffenstein remained in Landsberg until the Sack of Magdeburg, whereupon he departed for Thuringia in the rank of Generalwachtmeister and commanding an independent army. There he faced off Bernard of Saxe-Weimar, while Tilly advanced to Saxony and fought the Battle of Breitenfeld. Swedish penetration into southern Germany led to the recall of Wallenstein into active service. Scharffenstein switched back into the Liga army, becoming the governor of the Upper Palatinate on 1 January 1632 and being promoted to General of the Artillery. In his new capacity he coordinated the efforts of the Imperial and Liga armies. On 9 March, he defeated the Swedes in the Battle of Bamberg, the first such victory in the war.

== Defection and Death ==
On 15 April, he fought at the Battle of Rain commanding the Liga cavalry. On 17 April, the retiring Tilly suggested Scharffenstein as his successor in the command of the Liga troops. Scharffenstein assumed the position temporarily; however, Maximilian I, Elector of Bavaria replaced him with Johann von Aldringen, after Wallenstein protested the decision going as far as threatening to quit if Scharffenstein was appointed. Scharffenstein's distaste for Wallenstein grew into an open hatred, prompting him to defect to the Swedes through secret negotiations with Bernard in May 1633. He tried to surrender Ingolstadt to the Swedes the moment he deemed his other rival Aldringen (who was fighting in Swabia) was most vulnerable. The Bernardines arrived too late, ruining his plan and forcing him to flee to Bernard. As a Swedish field marshal he fought side by side with Bernard in Bohemia and the Upper Palatinate, before advancing to Franconia at the head of 5,000 men. On 5 November 1634, he commanded the Swedish right flank at the Battle of Nördlingen opposite Johann von Werth. The Swedes were defeated, and 4,000 men fell into captivity including Scharffenstein and Gustav Horn, Count of Pori. He was taken to Vienna where he managed to escape and fled to Silesia. He was seized again and brought back to Vienna where he was convicted of treason and executed on 26 July 1635.
