= Battle of Nördlingen (1634) =

Battle of the Thirty Years' War

- Part of the Thirty Years' War
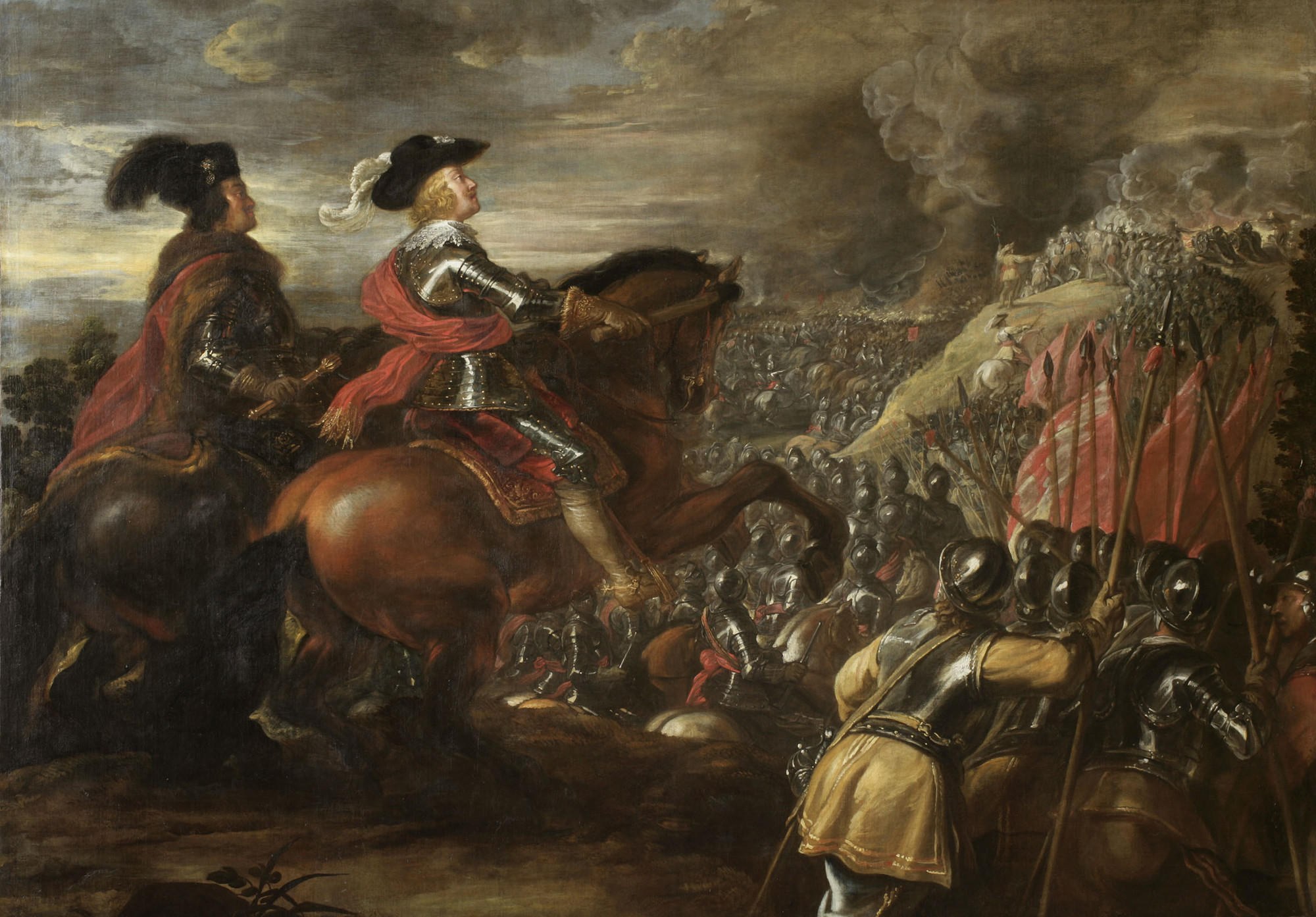
- The Battle of Nördlingen by Jan van den Hoecke
Date	5–6 September 1634 (N.S.)
Location	Nördlingen, Bavaria, Germany 48°48′20″N 10°29′09″E
Result	Imperial-Spanish victory

Belligerents
Spanish Empire; Holy Roman Empire; Catholic League	Swedish Empire; Heilbronn League

Commanders and leaders
(Spanish Empire) Cardinal-Infante Ferdinand (Spain) Count Leganés (Holy Roman Empire) Ferdinand of Hungary (Holy Roman Empire) Matthias Gallas (Holy Roman Empire) Ottavio Piccolomini; Charles de Lorraine	(Swedish Empire) Gustav Horn (POW); (Swedish Empire) Bernhard of Saxe-Weimar; Scharffenstein (executed)

Strength
33,000 (Note: Split into 15,000 Spanish, 9,500 Imperialists, and 8,500 Bavarians); 50 guns	25,700 (Note: Including into 8,000 men from Würrtemberg); 68 guns

Casualties and losses
c. 3,500 killed or wounded	12,000–14,000 killed or captured; 68 guns captured

The Battle of Nördlingen, (Note: German: Schlacht bei Nördlingen; Spanish: Batalla de Nördlingen; Swedish: Slaget vid Nördlingen) fought over two days from 5 to 6 September 1634, was a major battle of the Thirty Years' War. An Imperial–Spanish force led by the Cardinal-Infante Ferdinand and Ferdinand of Hungary inflicted a crushing defeat on the Swedish–German army led by Gustav Horn and Bernhard of Saxe-Weimar.

By 1634, the Swedes and their German allies occupied much of southern Germany. This allowed them to block the Spanish Road, an overland supply route running from Italy to Flanders, used to support Spain's war against the Dutch Republic. Seeking to re-open this, a Spanish army under the Cardinal-Infante linked up with Imperial forces near Nördlingen, which was held by a Swedish garrison.

Horn and Bernhard of Saxe-Weimar marched to its relief, but significantly underestimated the numbers they faced. After limited fighting on 5 September, on the 6th they launched a series of assaults south of Nördlingen, all of which were repulsed. Superior numbers allowed the Spanish-Imperial commanders to continually reinforce their positions, and Horn ordered his troops to withdraw. As they did so, they were outflanked by Imperial cavalry and retreat turned into a rout, with both Horn and his deputy Scharffenstein among those taken prisoner.

Defeat forced the Swedes to withdraw from Bavaria, while in May 1635 their major German allies signed the Peace of Prague with Emperor Ferdinand II. In response, France now intervened on behalf of Sweden and the Dutch Republic by declaring war on Spain, and entering the Thirty Years' War as an active belligerent. As a consequence, some suggest Nördlingen was the pivotal battle of the Thirty Years' War.

== Background ==
Swedish intervention in the Thirty Years' War began in June 1630 when nearly 18,000 troops under Gustavus Adolphus landed in the Duchy of Pomerania. Provided with subsidies as part of a French policy of opposition to the Habsburgs, and supported by Saxony and Brandenburg-Prussia, Gustavus won a series of victories over Imperial forces, including Breitenfeld in September 1631, then Rain in April 1632.

Despite the death of Gustavus at Lützen in November 1632, Sweden and its German allies formed the Heilbronn League in April 1633, once again financed by France. In July, the coalition defeated an Imperial army at Oldendorf in Lower Saxony; a few months later, Emperor Ferdinand II dismissed his leading general Albrecht von Wallenstein, who was assassinated by Imperial agents in February 1634.

1634 campaign; key locations. "Blue lines" indicate rivers, vital for moving men and supplies and thus the focus of most campaigns; note Danube, axis of advance for the Imperialists

The removal of Wallenstein made Emperor Ferdinand more reliant on the Spanish. Since their primary objective was re-opening the Spanish Road to support their campaign against the Dutch Republic, the focus now shifted to the Rhineland and Bavaria. Cardinal-Infante Ferdinand, newly appointed Governor of the Spanish Netherlands, recruited an army of 11,700 in Italy, which in May crossed the Alps through the Stelvio Pass. At Rheinfelden, he linked up with forces previously commanded by the Duke of Feria, who died in January 1634. This brought his numbers up to 18,000 infantry and 4,000 cavalry.

The Swedes and their German allies largely operated as separate units, each with their own objectives. While Johan Banér and Hans von Arnim invaded Bohemia, Gustav Horn tried to block the Spanish by investing Überlingen, and Bernhard of Saxe-Weimar sought to consolidate his position in Franconia by taking Kronach. Neither was successful and left Regensburg isolated, which was besieged on 23 May by an Imperial army of 25,000 under Ferdinand of Hungary. Horn and Bernhard met at Augsburg on 12 July and marched towards the Bohemian border, hoping the threat of them combining with Arnim would force Ferdinand to abandon the siege.

Although they defeated an Imperial blocking force under Johann von Aldringen at Landshut on 22 July, the siege continued and Regensburg surrendered on 26 July. With 15,000 men, Ferdinand marched down the Danube (see Map) and reached Donauwörth on 26 August, where he turned aside to besiege the Swedish-held town of Nördlingen, which had to be taken before continuing his advance. Horn and Bernhard marched to Bopfingen but delayed their attack; with both sides short of supplies and suffering from plague, they were confident the outnumbered Imperials would have to withdraw.

However, on 2 September the Imperial and Spanish armies linked up, and Nördlingen nearly fell to an assault two days later. Horn and Bernhard were joined by 3,400 men under Scharffenstein, giving them around 26,000 in total, although this included 8,000 poorly trained Württemberg militia, many of whom had previously served in the Imperial army. Horn wanted to wait for additional troops, which were a week's march away, but Bernhard urged an immediate attack, claiming the Spanish reinforcements numbered less than 7,000. The true figure was over 18,000, which meant the combined Spanish-Imperial army totalled over 33,000 and outnumbered their opponents.

== Battle ==
Phase 1: 6 September 5:00 to 6:00 am; the Swedes (blue) take the Albuch, before being repulsed by Spanish-Imperial troops (red)

Early on 5 September, the Protestant army broke camp, feinted west as if retreating to Ulm, then moved across country to seize a line of hills two kilometres south of Nördlingen. From west to east, these included the Himmelrech, Ländle, Lachberg, Heselberg, and Albuch, the latter in particular being key to the Spanish left. The Cardinal-Infante ordered these to be occupied, with veterans from the Tercio of Fuenclara holding the Heselberg.

Later in the afternoon, infantry led by Bernhard of Saxe-Weimar made contact with Spanish and Imperial pickets on the Himmelreich, which was quickly captured. They then occupied the Ländle and Lachberg hills, before their advance was stopped by Spanish troops holding the Heselberg. Despite a heavy artillery bombardment, a number of Swedish assaults were repulsed, before Horn ordered a halt just before midnight.

The delay allowed Cerbellón and the Tercio of Toraldo time to construct defensive positions on the Albuch, and around 2:00 am on 6 September, the Heselberg was abandoned. This meant it was defended by 6,600 Spanish veterans led by Leganés and Cerbellón, 1,500 Bavarian infantry under Ottavio Piccolomini, a battery of 14 guns, along with 2,800 cavalry. The rest of the Imperial army was left holding a line running north to Nördlingen.

The defenders of the Albuch faced 8,800 infantry commanded by Horn, along with 4,000 cavalry and 800 dragoons, led by Scharffenstein. Bernhard and the remaining troops took position opposite their Imperial counterparts, with 2,000–2,500 Württemberg militia in the rear protecting the baggage train. Bernhard was tasked with preventing the Imperial right reinforcing their colleagues on the Albuch, although it soon became clear he was badly outnumbered, and was thus restricted to limited skirmishing.

Phase 2; 7:30 am to 10:30 am; a series of Swedish-German infantry and cavalry assaults are repulsed

At 5:00 am on 6 September, the Swedish artillery opened fire, followed by a general assault on the Albuch led by the Scottish and Vitzhum brigades, along with 3 cavalry squadrons. Scharffenstein's cavalry were quickly repelled by their Spanish counterparts, but the relatively inexperienced infantry gave ground. Horn believed he was on the verge of a great victory, but as the Imperial troops fell back in disorder, they were rallied by veterans from the Tercio of Idiáquez, who drove forward in a sudden counterattack, taking their opponents by surprise and re-forming their lines. By 6:00 am, Imperial forces were back in control of the Albuch.

Whilst reorganising his scattered infantry, Horn kept up the pressure by ordering a second attack, which was stopped short of the Spanish positions with heavy losses. followed by another attack with all available troops, which also failed. With his forces largely unengaged, at 7:30 am Bernhard transferred the Thurn brigade to join a series of assaults, which persisted for another hour without success. Their numerical superiority allowed Leganés and Gallas to send a constant stream of reinforcements to support those holding the Albuch.

Phase 3: late morning; Horn retreats, and a general Spanish-Imperial advance routs the Protestant army

Trying to prevent this, Bernhard moved his cavalry against the Imperial right, but they were repulsed and forced back to their previous positions. The troops assaulting the Albuch were exhausted, and after one last attack around 10:00 am, Horn ordered them to hold their positions until nightfall, before withdrawing towards Ulm. However, seeing their adversaries pulling back, the Spanish-Imperial troops began a general advance, routing Bernhard's cavalry and allowing Croat light cavalry to outflank his infantry. At the same time, combined Imperial, Bavarian, and Spanish forces attacked the Heselberg, driving those holding it into the woods.

Horn's men were now attacked on two sides, from troops advancing from the Albuch, and Imperial cavalry charging out of the woods, cutting off his retreat. His army disintegrated, and suffered between 12,000 and 14,000 casualties, compared to 3,500 for their opponents. (Note: Other sources suggest the Protestant losses were as high as 16,000) This included 4,000 prisoners, most of whom were enrolled in the Imperial army. Scharffenstein, previously a senior Bavarian commander, was captured and later executed for treason, while Horn was held in custody until 1642. Bernhard and von Taupadel reached Heilbronn with the survivors a few days later.

== Aftermath ==
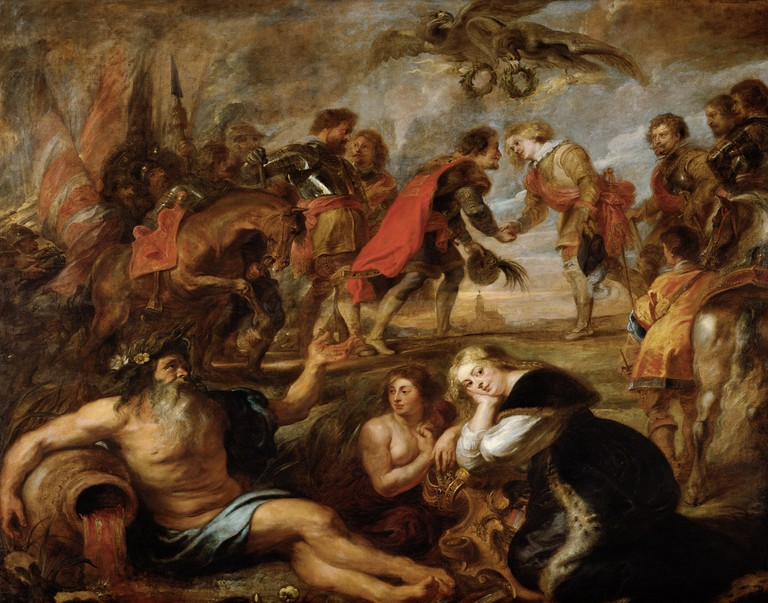
The Victory of the Two Ferdinands, Peter Paul Rubens (1635)

Nördlingen effectively destroyed Swedish power in southern Germany, and has been described by some commentators as "arguably the most important battle of the war". It has been also portrayed as "a Spanish victory," with victory owing much to the performance of the veteran tercios, while Cardinal-Infante Ferdinand performed well in what was his first battlefield command. The Imperial army retook most of Württemberg and moved into the Rhineland, while Ferdinand and his troops continued into the Spanish Netherlands, where he took up his appointment as Governor.

Swedish Chancellor Axel Oxenstierna faced domestic pressure to end the war, stating defeat was "so terrible, it couldn't have been worse." In December, two of their main allies, Saxony and Hesse-Darmstadt, negotiated a peace agreement with Emperor Ferdinand, later formalised in the May 1635 Treaty of Prague. Its terms included the dissolution of the Heilbronn and Catholic Leagues, and the treaty is generally seen as the point when the Thirty Years' War ceased to be primarily a German religious conflict.

However, the collapse of the anti-Habsburg alliance in Germany now prompted direct French intervention. In February 1635, Cardinal Richelieu signed a treaty agreeing a joint Franco-Dutch offensive in the Spanish Netherlands, while a French army under Henri, Duke of Rohan, cut the Spanish Road by invading the Valtellina in March. This was followed in April by a new alliance with Sweden, as well as financing an army of 12,000 under Bernard of Saxe-Weimar in the Rhineland. In May, France formally declared war on Spain, starting the 1635 to 1659 Franco-Spanish War.

== Sources ==
- Aedo y Gallart, Diego (1884). Des Don Diego de Aedo y Gallart Schilderung der Schlacht von Nördlingen (i.J. 1634) Aus dessen Viaje del Infante Cardenal Don Fernando de Austria ... und mit Anmerkungen versehen (German ed.). De Gruyter.
- Benavides, José Ignacio (2021). El Cardenal Infante (La esperanza frustrada de la monarquía hispánica, 1609-1641). La Esfera de los Libros. ISBN 978-8491648659.
- David, Saul (2012). The Encyclopedia of War. Dorling Kindersley. ISBN 978-1-4093-8664-3.
- Guthrie, William (2001). Battles of the Thirty Years War: From White Mountain to Nordlingen, 1618–1635. Praeger. ISBN 978-0-313-32028-6.
- Kamen, Henry (2003). Spain's Road to Empire. Allen Lane. ISBN 978-0-14-028528-4.
- Lorenzana, Francisco (2018). La Guerra de los Treinta Años: El ocaso del Imperio español. Madrid: Kailas Editorial. ISBN 978-84-17248-26-0.
- Parker, Geoffrey (1997) [1984]. The Thirty Years' War. Routledge. ISBN 978-0-415-12883-4. (with several contributors)
- Picouet, Pierre (2019). The Armies of Philip IV of Spain 1621–1665: The Fight for European Supremacy (Century of the Soldier). Warwick: Helion & Company Limited. ISBN 978-1-911628-61-3.
- Pike, John (2023). The Thirty Years War, 1618–1648: The First Global War and the End of Habsburg Supremacy. Yorkshire: Pen and Sword Military. ISBN 978-1-52677-575-7.
- Riches, Daniel (2012). Protestant Cosmopolitanism and Diplomatic Culture: Brandenburg-Swedish Relations in the Seventeenth Century. The Northern World: North Europe and the Baltic c. 400–1700 AD. Peoples, Economies and Cultures vol. 59. Brill. ISBN 978-90-04-24079-7. ISSN 1569-1462. Protestant Cosmopolitanism and Diplomatic Culture at Google Books.
- Wedgwood, C. V. (2005) [1938]. The Thirty Years War. New York Review of Books. ISBN 978-1-59017-146-2.
- Wilson, Peter (2009). The Thirty Years War: Europe's Tragedy. London: Belknap Press. ISBN 978-0-674-06231-3.
- Wilson, Peter (2020). La Guerra de los Treinta Años (vol. 1-2): Una tragedia europea. Madrid: Desperta Ferro Ediciones. ISBN 978-84-121687-9-2.
