= Hakkapeliitta =

Finnish light cavalry that served during the Thirty Years' War

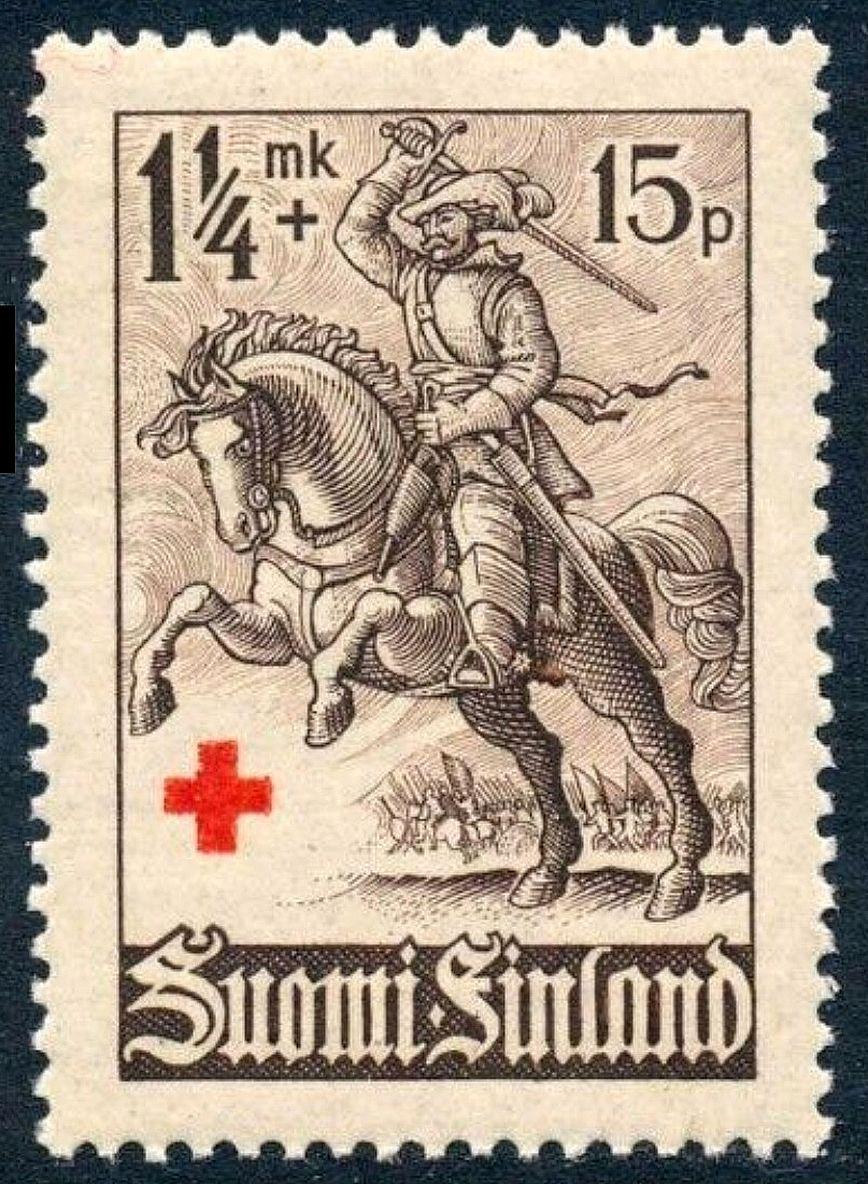
Hakkapeliitta featured on a 1940 semi-postal Finnish postage stamp

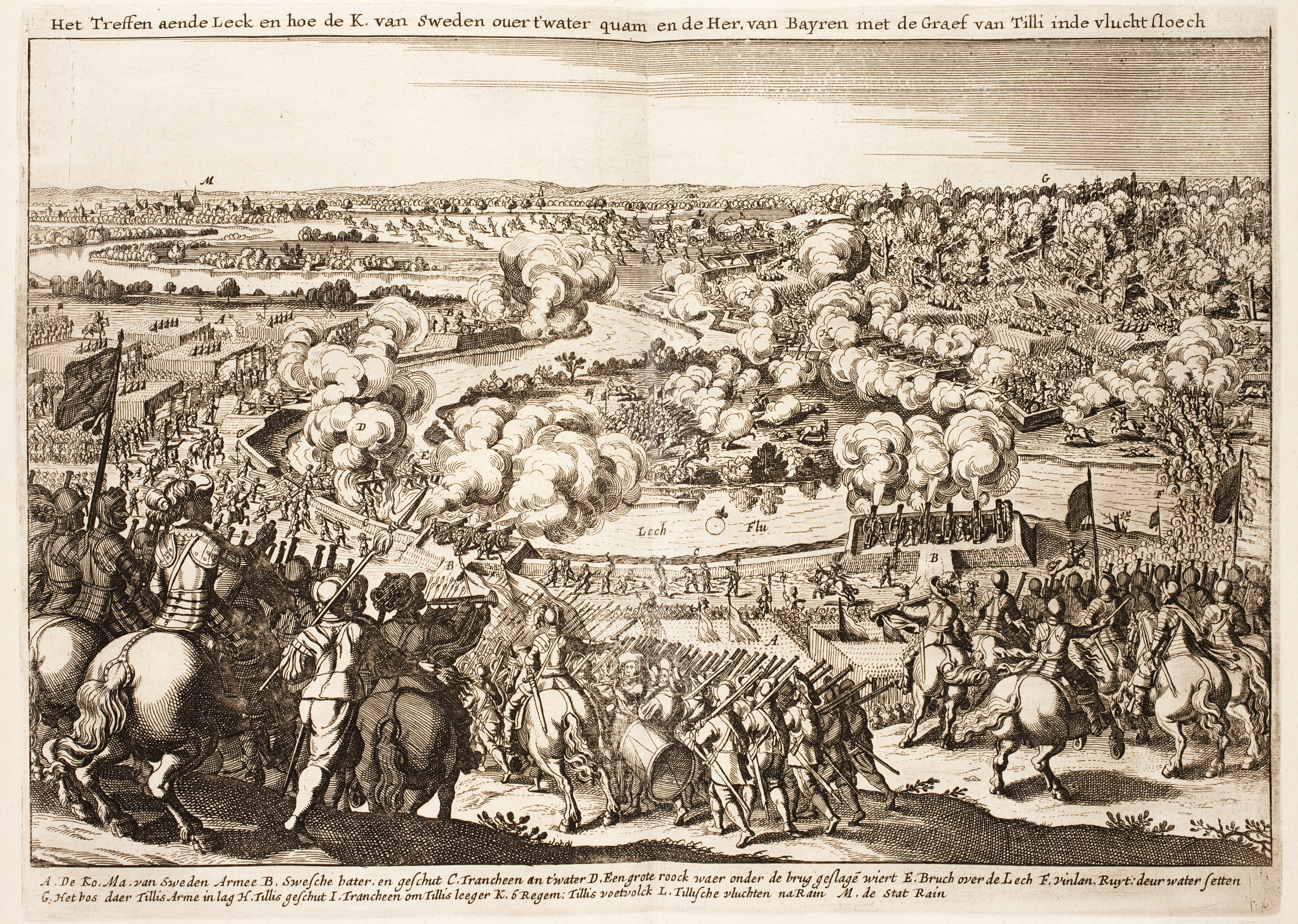
Finnish cavalry crossing the river Lech in the Battle of Rain, Thirty Years' War, 1632. Matthias Merian in Danckerts Historis, 1642.

Hakkapeliitta (Finnish pl. hakkapeliitat) is a historiographical term used for a Finnish light cavalryman in the service of King Gustavus Adolphus of Sweden during the Thirty Years' War (1618 to 1648). Hakkapeliitta is a 19th-century Finnish modification of a contemporary name given by foreigners in the Holy Roman Empire and variously spelled as Hackapelit, Hackapelite, Hackapell, Haccapelit, or Haccapelite. These terms were based on a Finnish battle cry hakkaa päälle (lit. 'strike upon [them]'; Swedish: hacka på), commonly translated as 'Cut them down!'

The hakkapeliitta-style cavalry was first used during the Polish-Swedish Wars of the late 16th century. In the early 17th century the cavalry led by the Field Marshal Jacob De la Gardie participated in campaigns against Poland and Russia. The Hakkapeliitta cavalry men led by Field Marshal Gustaf Horn were vital to the Swedish victories in Germany during the Thirty Years' War.

The Finnish military march Hakkapeliittain Marssi is named after the Hakkapeliitta.

== Tactics ==
The Hakkapeliitta were well-trained Finnish light cavalrymen who excelled in skirmishing, raiding and reconnaissance, as well as in pitched battles. The greatest advantage these lightly armored horsemen had were the speed and ferocity of their charge. They were equipped like the typical harquebusier light cavalry of their era; armed with a broadsword and two wheellock pistols and protected by a buff coat and a pot helmet. A steel breastplate was often worn as well. They would attack at a full gallop, the troopers on the front rank firing their pistols at near-contact distance and the whole formation crashing through the enemy at sword point. The horses themselves were another weapon, as they were used to trample enemy infantrymen. The horses used by the Hakkapeliitta were the ancestors of the modern Finnhorse; they were strong and durable.

== Organization ==
The Swedish army then had three cavalry regiments from Finland:

- Nyland and Tavastehus County Cavalry Regiment (Swedish: Nylands och Tavastehus läns kavalleriregemente)
- Åbo and Björneborg County Cavalry Regiment (Åbo och Björneborgs läns kavalleriregemente)
- Viborg and Nyslott County Cavalry Regiment (Viborgs och Nyslotts läns kavalleriregemente)

Their most famous commander was Torsten Stålhandske, who was commissioned as a lieutenant-colonel with the Nyland and Tavastehus Cavalry Regiment in 1629 and led it for the first time in the Thirty Years' War. The original provincial regiments (landskapsregementen) had been raised by splitting the old Grand regiments (Storregementen); also "Land regiments" (landsregementen), organized by Gustavus Adolphus at the end of the 1610s, forming 21 infantry and eight cavalry regiments as written in the Swedish constitution of 1634.

== Notable battles ==
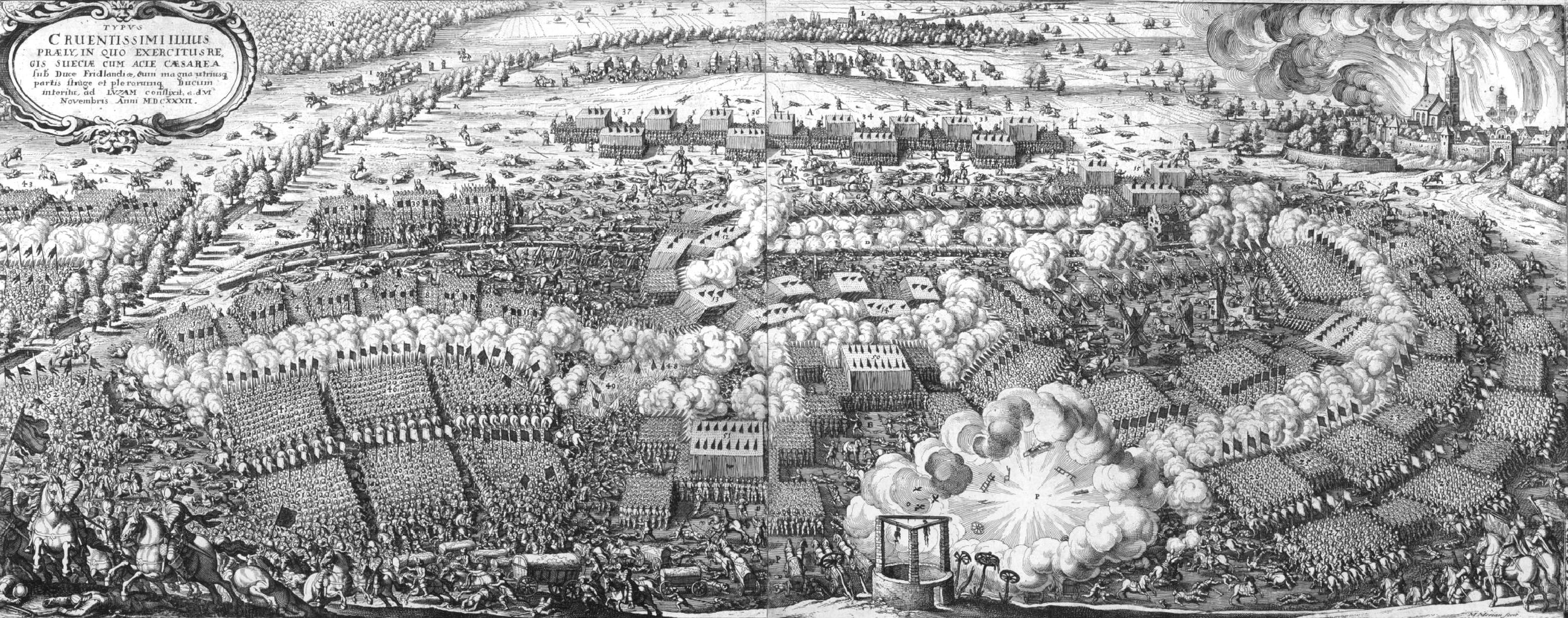
The Battle of Lützen

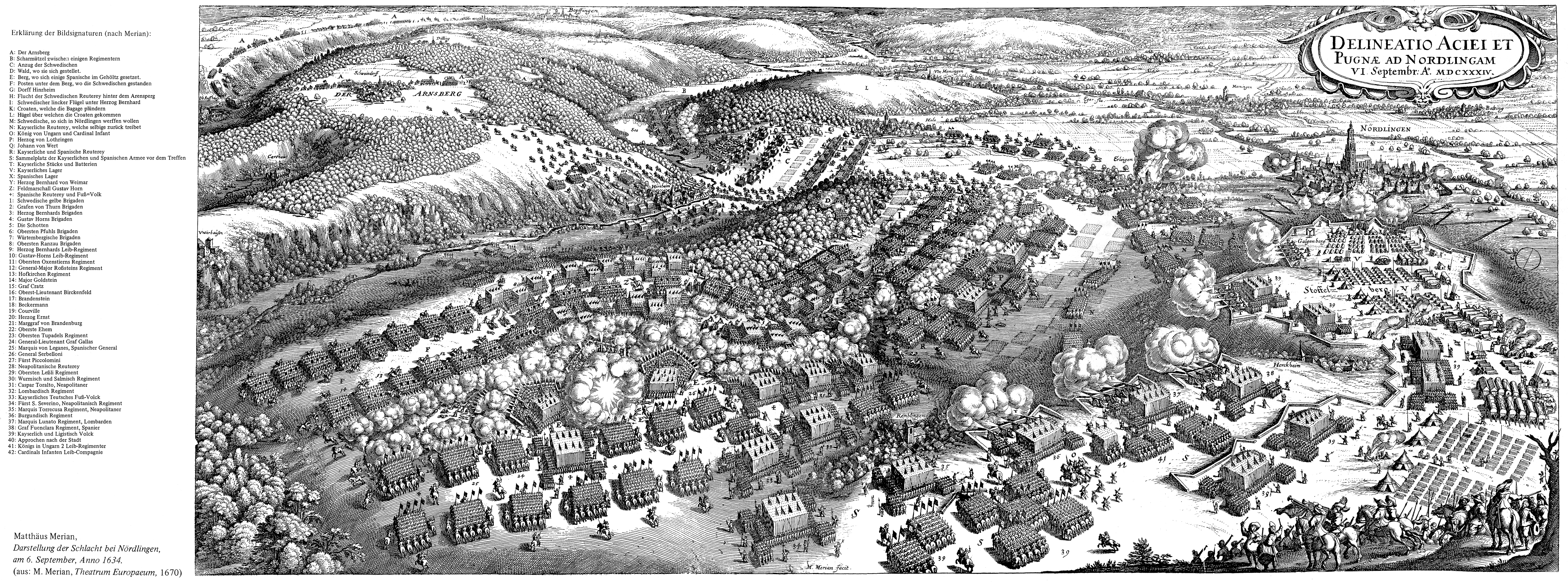
The Battle of Nördlingen

The main battles in which the Hakkapeliitta took part during the Thirty Years' War were:

- Breitenfeld in 1631
- Lech in 1632
- Battle of Alte Veste in 1632
- Lützen in 1632
- Nördlingen in 1634
- Leipzig in 1642 (also known as the Second Battle of Breitenfeld or the First Battle of Leipzig)
- Jankau in 1645

200 Hakkapeliitta were also part of the army which King Karl X Gustav of Sweden led across the frozen Danish straits in the winter of 1658, which enabled him to conquer Skåneland from Denmark in the Treaty of Roskilde. Many Finnish soldiers served under the Swedish Empire. During the era of the Swedish Empire of the 17th century, the Finnish cavalry was constantly used in Germany, Bohemia, Poland, and Denmark. Parts of the cavalry were stationed in Estonia and Livonia.

== In popular culture ==
- The Bearkillers, a protagonist faction in S.M. Stirling's Emberverse series, uses the Hakkapeliitta battle cry.
- The module of the Advanced Squad Leader board game system, depicting the Finnish forces in World War II, is titled Hakkaa Päälle!
- Nokian Tyres and its predecessor firms have made a snow tire called Hakkapeliitta since 1936.
- Hakkapeliitta's feature in Eric Flint's 1632 novel series as one part of Gustav II Adolf's armies.
- The song "Rex Regi Rebellis" by Finnish metal band Turisas describes the adventures of the Hakkapeliitta and includes the battle cry Hakkaa päälle pohjan poika! (Strike them down, son of the North!).
- The Hakkapeliitta is included in the video game Age of Empires III as a mercenary unit, under the name hackapell. When Age of Empires III: Definitive Edition released, the Hackapell mercenary was removed and replaced with a more generic "Harquebusier" unit. This is due to the introduction of a full Swedes civilization, who can field non-mercenary Hakkapelit from the Stable. While historically the Hakkapeliitta are light cavalry, until Patch 13.27885 of the Knights of the Mediterranean expansion, the game classifies them as Ranged Heavy Cavalry. Thereafter, Hakkapeliitta are correctly classified as Light Cavalry, albeit still primarily a ranged unit.
- In Civilization V, the Hakkapeliitta are a unique unit of the Swedish Empire under Gustavus Adolphus.
- Hakkapeliitta is the only unique unit of the Swedish Empire's unit roster in the strategy game Empire: Total War.
- In the Anime Jormungand, Sophia Valmer use this war cry before engaging in hand to hand combat situation with knives, in episode 12 of the first season.
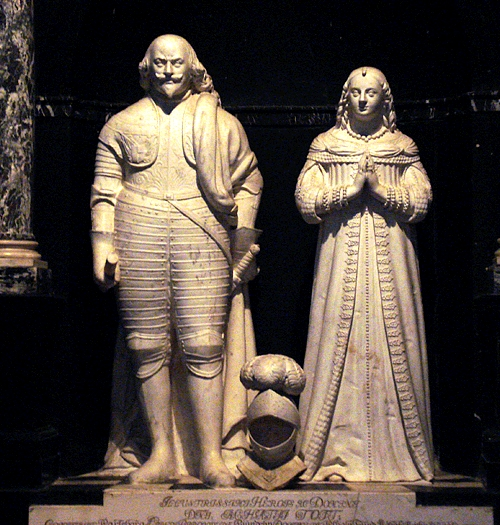
Åke Henriksson Tott's tomb in the Cathedral of Turku
