= Battle of Oldendorf =

1633 battle of the Thirty Years' War

- Part of the Thirty Years' War
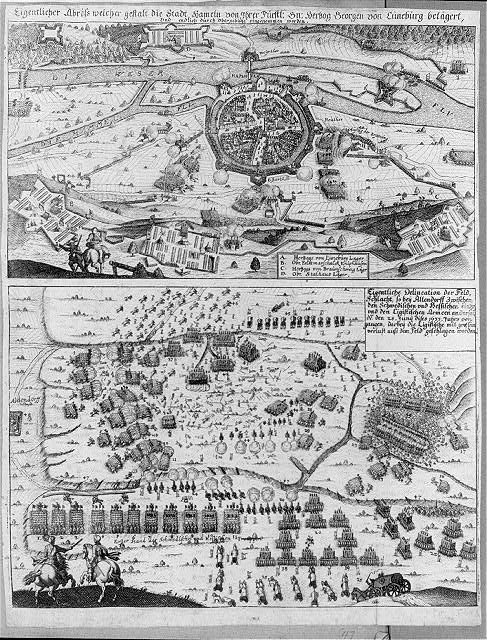
- Engraving showing the Siege of Hamelin and Battle of Oldendorf
| Date | 8 July 1633 |
| Location | Hessisch-Oldendorf, Germany |
| Result | Swedish victory |

Belligerents
| (yes) Swedish Empire; Brunswick-Lüneburg; Hesse-Kassel | Holy Roman Empire |

Commanders and leaders
| Brunswick; (Swedish Empire) Knyphausen; Melander; (yes) Kagg; (yes) Stålhandske | Bönninghausen; Gronsfeld; Geleen; Jean de Merode † |

Strength
| 13,000; 37 guns | 14,700; 15 guns |

Casualties and losses
| 300–700 killed or wounded | 3,000–6,000 killed or wounded 1,000 captured |

The Battle of Oldendorf, (Note: German: Schlacht bei Hessisch-Oldendorf) took place on 8 July 1633 during the Thirty Years' War near Hessisch-Oldendorf in Lower Saxony. Troops besieging Hamelin led by the Duke of Brunswick combined with their Swedish allies to defeat an Imperial army sent to relieve the town.

== Background ==
Following Swedish intervention in the Thirty Years' War in 1630, William V, Landgrave of Hesse-Kassel allied with Gustavus Adolphus of Sweden, his distant relative and Protestant co-religionist. Sweden was joined by Hesse-Kassel and Brunswick-Lüneburg in reducing the Imperial presence in Westphalia, the Ruhr area and Sauerland.

Proximity to the Dutch Republic increased the strategic importance of this region when the Eighty Years' War with Spain restarted in 1621, but it remained a secondary theatre during the Thirty Years War, with few major battles. After Gustavus Adolphus was killed in November 1632, the Duke of Brunswick was appointed local Swedish commander. The 1633 campaign focused on securing the supply route stretching from Bremen on the coast south along the River Weser.

As part of this strategy, in March 1633 Brunswick invested Hamelin in Lower Saxony. To relieve the town, an Imperial army was assembled, commanded by Lothar von Bönninghausen, a Westphalian nobleman, with Gronsfeld and the Walloon exile Jean de Merode as his deputies. Although totalling approximately 11,000 infantry and 4,000 cavalry, most were inexperienced and poorly trained. Bönninghausen himself was a commander of limited ability, but whose reputation for brutality and plunder attracted recruits.

== Battle ==
The siege progressed slowly, and on 6 July the relief force reached Minden, where they were joined by additional cavalry commanded by Geleen. Meanwhile, Brunswick was reinforced by Swedish and Hessian troops led by Knyphausen, Torsten Stålhandske and Melander. Their combined army of 7,000 infantry and 6,000 cavalry marched out to meet Bönninghausen, leaving only a few hundred men to continue the siege.

Key locations in article

Late in the afternoon of 7 July, the two armies made contact near Hessisch-Oldendorf, approximately 20 kilometres northwest of Hamelin. The Swedish-German troops formed up on a plateau northwest of the town, their left in front of Oldendorf commanded by Knyphausen, Brunswick in the centre, then Melander on the right anchored on the nearby village of Barksen. They were shielded by woods on either flank, with a stream running along their entire front that negated Bönninghausen's superior numbers of infantry. The latter deployed his men 500 metres away, placing himself with the reserve in the rear, Geleen commanding the centre, with Gronsfeld and Merode on the right and left respectively.

The battle opened at 7:00 am with an artillery barrage, although this had relatively little impact. Shortly after 9:00 am, Gronsfeld ordered his troops to assault Swedish infantry under Lars Kagg, but they quickly lost momentum in the woods and were counter-attacked on both flanks. The more mobile Swedish field artillery allowed Melander to provide Kagg with close range support, unlike their opponents, while they were simultaneously outflanked by Brunswick's cavalry. After two hours of fighting, the Imperial troops began to fall back and Merode was killed sometime after 11:00 am.

The reserve fled without firing a shot, and fighting ended around 2:00 pm. Although his rearguard managed to hold off the pursuit, Bönninghausen lost over 3,000 dead or wounded, plus another 1,000 taken prisoner, against an estimated 700 casualties for Brunswick's army. Other sources put Imperial losses at over 6,000, those of the allies under 300.

== Aftermath ==
With no hope of relief, Hamelin surrendered and the Swedes seized Osnabrück, which they held until 1643. The Hessians also acquired a number of garrisons, although most of their army moved southeast in a bid to recover their homeland in 1634. Oldendorf was followed by a minor Swedish success at Pfaffenhofen an der Ilm on 11 August, but neither side gained a significant advantage from the 1633 campaign.

Defeat at Nördlingen on 6 September 1634 broke the Swedish hold on Southern Germany. Most of their German allies reconciled with Emperor Ferdinand and signed the Peace of Prague, including the Electorate of Saxony, leading to direct French intervention in the Thirty Years' War on the side of Sweden.

The Hessians were left in possession of most of their Westphalian garrisons in the hope they could be persuaded to sign the Peace of Prague, and integrate their troops into the Imperial army. The attempt ultimately failed, but was supported by Melander, who resigned from the Hessian army in 1640, then re-entered the war in 1645 as Imperial commander in Westphalia.

== Sources ==
- Burschel, Peter (1994). Söldner im Nordwestdeutschland des 16. und 17. Jahrhunderts (in German). Vandenhoeck & Ruprecht. ISBN 3-525-35650-1.
- Guthrie, William P (2002). Battles of the Thirty Years War: from White Mountain to Nordlingen, 1618-1635. Greenwood Publishing Group. ISBN 0-313-32028-4.
- Guthrie, William P (2003). The later Thirty Years War: from the Battle of Wittstock to the Treaty of Westphalia. Greenwood Publishing Group. ISBN 0-313-32408-5.
- Schattkowsky, Martina (2003). Witwenschaft in der frühen Neuzeit: Fürstliche und adlige Witwen zwischen Fremd- und Selbstbestimmung (in German). Leipziger Universitätsverlag. ISBN 3-936522-79-0.
- Wilson, Peter H. (2009). Europe's Tragedy: A History of the Thirty Years War. Allen Lane. ISBN 978-0-7139-9592-3.
- Wilson, Peter; Tkacova, K; Pert, Thomas (2023). "Mapping premodern small war: the case of the Thirty Years War (1618-48)". Small Wars & Insurgencies. 34 (6): 1043–1071. doi:10.1080/09592318.2023.2220503.
