= Battle of Lützen =

Battle of Lützen may refer to:

- Battle of Lützen (1632), part of the Thirty Years' War
- Battle of Lützen (1813), part of the War of the Sixth Coalition
