= Treaty of Compiègne (1635) =

Treaty of mutual defence between France and Sweden

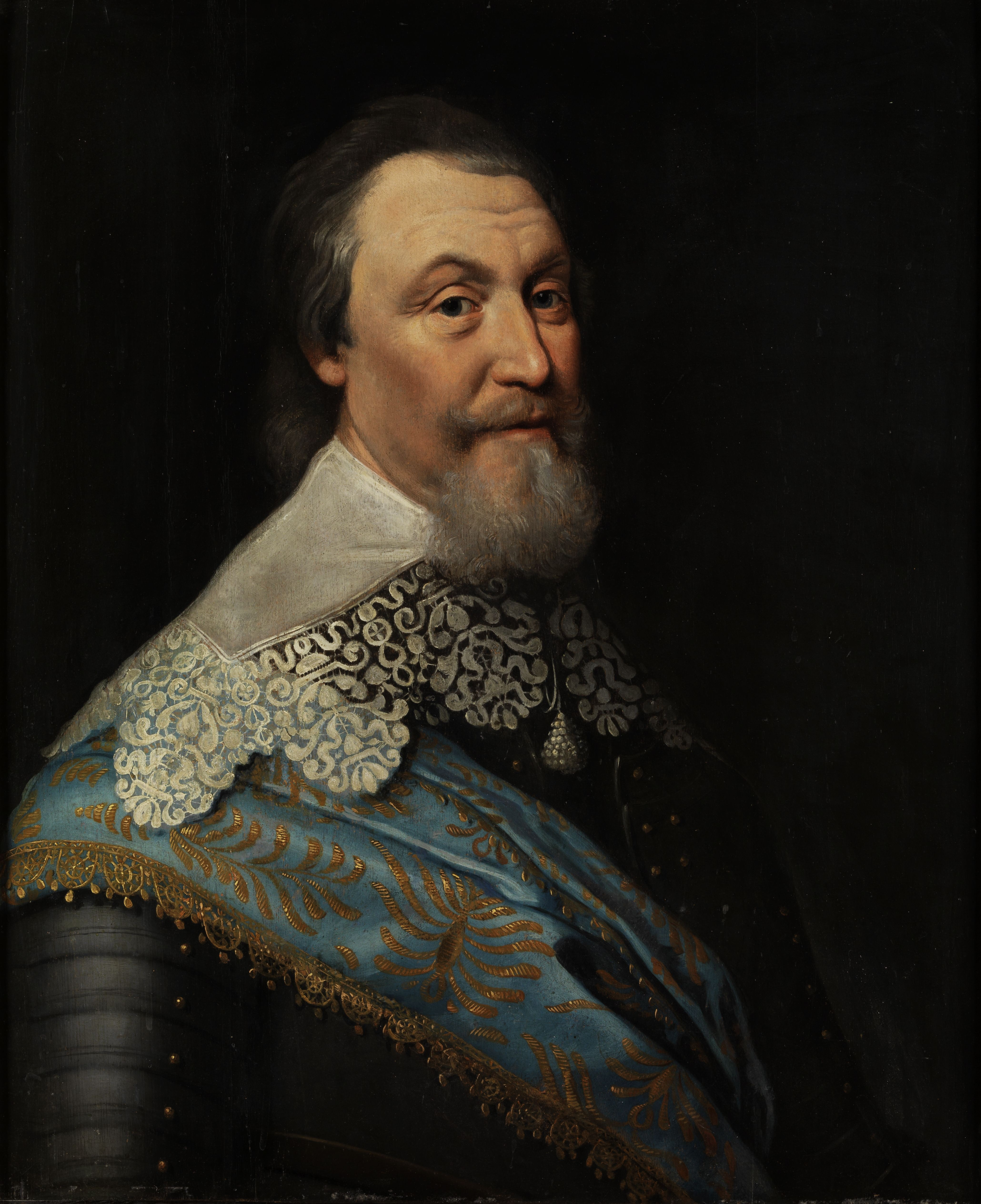
- Swedish Chancellor Axel Oxenstierna
- Signed: 30 April 1635
- Location: Compiègne, France
- Negotiators: (Kingdom of France) du Tremblay; (Swedish Empire) Hugo Grotius
- Original signatories: (Kingdom of France) Cardinal Richelieu; (Swedish Empire) Axel Oxenstierna
- Parties: France; (yes) Sweden
- Languages: French

The Treaty of Compiègne, signed on 30 April 1635 Old Style, was a mutual defence alliance between France and Sweden.

Prior to 1635, France provided indirect diplomatic and financial support to opponents of their Habsburg rivals in Spain and the Holy Roman Empire, but avoided direct involvement. This included backing the Dutch Republic in the Eighty Years' War with Spain, and Swedish intervention in the Thirty Years War.

After the Swedes and their German allies were defeated at Nördlingen in September 1634, France decided to enter the war. Under the treaty, they agreed to continue subsidising Swedish participation, and declare war on Spain, beginning the Franco-Spanish War (1635–1659).

== Background ==
A key factor in European politics during the 17th century was the struggle between the Bourbon kings of France and their Habsburg rivals in Spain and the Holy Roman Empire. Habsburg territories in the Spanish Netherlands, Franche-Comté, and the Pyrenees blocked French expansion, and made it vulnerable to invasion. Under Cardinal Richelieu, chief minister from 1624 until his death in 1642, French policy was to 'arrest the course of Spanish progress', and 'protect her neighbours from Spanish oppression'.

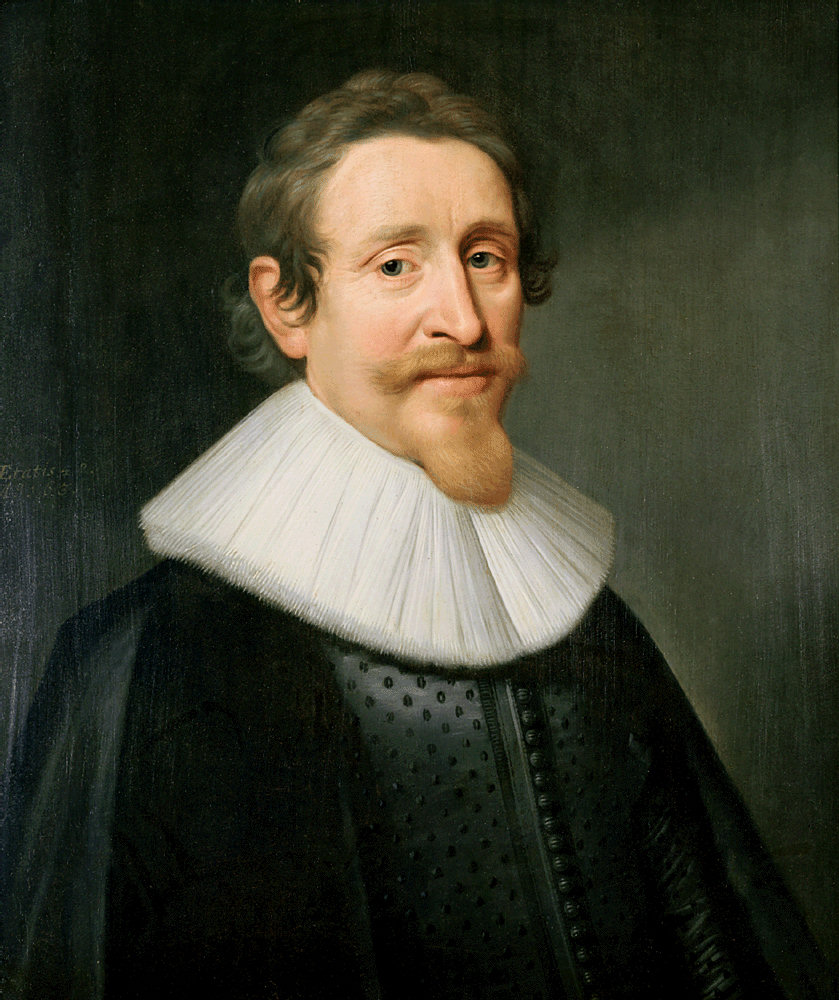
Dutch exile Hugo Grotius, appointed Swedish ambassador to Paris in 1635

With France weakened by domestic conflict, prior to 1634 Richelieu focused on supporting Habsburg opponents and creating defensive alliances, but avoiding direct conflict. The 1624 Treaty of Compiègne agreed to fund the Dutch revolt against Spain for three years, which was then renewed in 1627. Under the 1631 Treaty of Bärwalde, Richelieu also backed Swedish intervention in the Thirty Years War by financing a Swedish army of 36,000 for five years.

In 1633, Sweden and a number of German Protestant states formed the Heilbronn League, which suffered a serious defeat at Nördlingen in September 1634. This crisis moved Richelieu closer to direct intervention in the Thirty Years War; in October, French garrisons occupied towns in Alsace on the left bank of the Rhine, then part of the Empire. Richelieu also proposed replacing Bärwalde with the Treaty of Paris, an agreement between France and the Heilbronn League.

Although accepted by the Swedish representative Löffler, as well as the Germans, it was rejected by Chancellor Axel Oxenstierna. His main objection was that by paying subsidies to the Heilbronn League, rather than direct to Sweden, France gained much greater control over Sweden's German allies.

Löffler was replaced by the exiled Dutch lawyer Hugo Grotius, who was appointed Swedish Ambassador to France and ordered to discuss new terms. The main French negotiator, François Leclerc du Tremblay, continued to try to persuade him to accept the Treaty of Paris, delaying agreement. In February 1635, the Imperial army made significant gains in the Rhineland, and Oxenstierna himself traveled to Paris in April; the combination brought the two sides to rapid agreement on a new treaty between Sweden and France, signed on 30 April.

== Provisions ==
The treaty renewed the financial provisions made at Bärwalde, and set out zones of control in the Rhineland; Sweden recognised French ownership of the right bank, from Strasbourg to Breisach, while France agreed to ensure Sweden retained Mainz, Benfeld and Worms. To satisfy Richelieu's domestic critics, who questioned his alliances with Protestant powers, Sweden accepted the restoration of Catholicism in areas where it had been practised prior to 1618; France undertook to declare war on Spain, and both parties agreed not to make a separate peace.

== Aftermath ==
In addition to the treaty with the Swedes, France signed agreements with Bernard of Saxe-Weimar to provide 16,000 troops for a campaign in Alsace and the Rhineland, and an anti-Spain alliance with the Dutch. Oxenstierna delayed ratification of the treaty until 19 May, when France formally declared war on Spain and invaded the Spanish Netherlands. In May 1635, most of their German allies made peace in the 1635 Treaty of Prague, and the Heilbronn League was dissolved. The combination of these events is generally considered to mark the point at which the Thirty Years War stopped being primarily a religious conflict.

== Sources ==
- Hayden, J Michael (1973). "Continuity in the France of Henry IV and Louis XIII: French Foreign Policy, 1598-1615". The Journal of Modern History. 45 (1): 1–23. doi:10.1086/240888. JSTOR 1877591. S2CID 144914347.
- Knox, Bill (2017). Tucker, Spencer (ed.). The 1635 Treaty of Prague; a failed settlement? in Enduring Controversies in Military History, Volume I: Critical Analyses and Context. Greenwood Press. ISBN 978-1440841194.
- Lord Acton (1934). Ward, AW; Prothero, GW (eds.). The Cambridge Modern History Volume IV - The Thirty Years War. Cambridge University Press.
- Maland, David (1980). Europe at War, 1600-50. Palgrave Macmillan. ISBN 978-0333234464.
- O'Connell, Daniel Patrick (1968). Richelieu. Weidenfeld & Nicolson.
- Poot, Anton (2013). Crucial years in Anglo-Dutch relations (1625-1642): the political and diplomatic contacts. Uitgeverij Verloren. ISBN 978-9087043803.
- Tucker, Spencer (2017). The Roots and Consequences of Civil Wars and Revolutions: Conflicts That Changed World History. ABC-CLIO. ISBN 978-1440842931.
- Wedgwood, CV (1938). The Thirty Years War (2005 ed.). New York Review of Books. ISBN 978-1590171462.
