= Battle of Rain order of battle =

The following units and commanders fought in the Battle of Rain.

== Swedish Army ==
King Gustav II Adolf of Sweden

=== Infantry ===
- Hand Infantry Regiment (Swedish)
- Hand Infantry Regiment (Swedish)
- Second Infantry of the 3rd Regiment (Danish)
- Hastger Infantry Regiment (Finnish)
- Royal Guard Coy (Mixed)
- N. Brahe Infantry Regiment (German)
- Winckel Infantry Regiment (German)
- Thurn Infantry Regiment (German)
- Baner Infantry Regiment (German)
- Bernard Saxe-Weimar Infantry Regiment (German)
- Burt Infantry Regiment (German)
- Chemnitz Infantry Regiment (German)
- Forbes Infantry Regiment (German)
- Horn Infantry Regiment (German)
- Kagge Infantry Regiment (German)
- Kanoffsky Infantry Regiment (German)
- Liebenstein Infantry Regiment (German)
- Mitschefall Infantry Regiment (German)
- Mitzlaff Infantry Regiment (German)
- Monro of Fowles Infantry Regiment (German)
- Riese Infantry Regiment (German)
- Schaffalitsky Infantry Regiment (German)
- B. Schlammersdorf Infantry Regiment (German)
- T. Schlammersdorf Infantry Regiment (German)
- Schneidwinds Infantry Regiment (German)
- Truchsess Infantry Regiment (German)
- Wildenstein Infantry Regiment (German)
- Hepburn Infantry Regiment (Scottish)
- Mackay Infantry Regiment (German)
- Spens (German)

=== Cavalry ===
- Stenbock Cuirassier (Swedish)
- Soop Cuirassier (Swedish)
- Silversparre Squadron (Swedish)
- Sack Squadron (Swedish)
- Sperreuter Squadron (Swedish)
- Stålhandske Cuirassier (Finnish)
- Tesenhaussen (Livonian)
- Domhoff Squadron (Kurland)
- Baudissin Cuirassier (German)
- B. Saxe-Weiver Cuirassier (German)
- Horn Cuirassier (German)
- Kotchtitzky Cuirassier (German)
- Baden Cuirassier (German)
- Monro of Fowles Cuirassier (German)
- Schonberg Cuirassier (German)
- Soms Squadron (German)
- Sperreuter Cuirassier (German)
- Streiff Squadron (German)
- Tott Cuirassier (German)
- Truchsess Cuirassier (German)
- Uslar Cuirassier (German)
- Wedel Cuirassier (German)
- W. Saxe Weimer Cuirassier (German)
- Ohm Cuirassier (German)
- Horn Leib Coy (German)
- Du Menys Dragoon (German)
- Taupadel Dragoon (German)

== Holy Roman Empire – Catholic League Army ==
John Tserclaes, Count of Tilly

=== Infantry ===
- Alt-Till Infantry Regiment (Catholic League-Wurzburg)
- Reinach Infantry Regiment (Catholic League-High German)
- Comargo Infantry Regiment (Catholic League-High German)
- Pappenheim Infantry Regiment (Catholic League-High German)
- Wahl Infantry Regiment (Catholic League-High German)
- Jung-Furstenberg Infantry Regiment (Catholic League-High German)
- Free Companies Infantry Regiment (Catholic League-High German)
- Beck Infantry Regiment (Imperialist-Walloon)
- Conteras Infantry Regiment (Imperialist-German)
- Savelli Infantry Regiment (Imperialist-Low German)
- Witzleban Infantry Regiment (Imperialist-German)
- Baldiron Infantry Regiment (Imperialist-Spanish)
- Fahrenbach Infantry Regiment (Imperialist-High German)
- Rittberg Infantry Regiment (Imperialist-German)

=== Cavalry ===
- Cronberg Heavy Cavalry (Catholic League-High German)
- Billehe Heavy Cavalry (Catholic League-High German)
- J. Fugger Cuirassier (Catholic League-Low German)
- Blankhart Cuirassier (Catholic League-Low German)
- D'Espagne Cuirassier (Catholic League-Low German)
- Cratz Cuirassier (Catholic League-High German)
- Hasslang Cuirassier (Catholic League-High German)
- Merode Cuirassier (Catholic League-High German)
- Free Coy (Catholic League-High German)
- Dragoons (Catholic League-High German)
- O.H. Fugger Croats (Catholic League-High German)
- Merode Arquebussier (Imperialist-Walloon)
- Bucquoy Heavy Cavalry (Imperialist-Walloon)
- Free Coy (Imperialist-High German)
- Croats Light Cavalry (Imperialist-Croatian)

== Sources ==
- Welsh, William E. "The Lion Conquers Bavaria: The Battle of the Lech, April 1632." Strategy & Tactics, Number 229 (July/August 2005) ISSN 1040-886X
