= Peace of Prague (1635) =

Saxony makes peace with Emperor Ferdinand

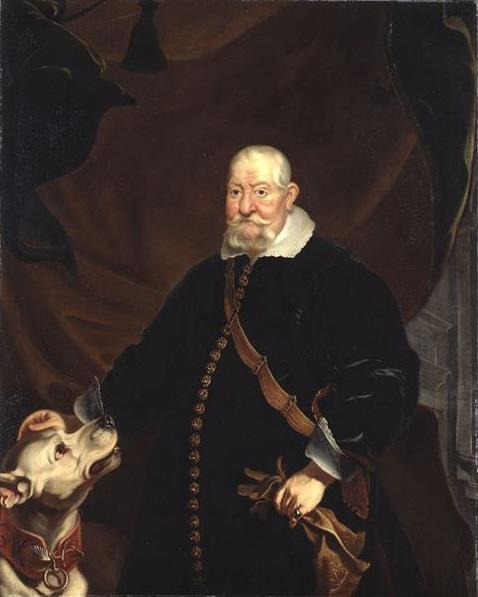
- John George I, Elector of Saxony
- Signed: 30 May 1635 (Note: All dates in article are Old Style)
- Location: Prague Castle, Bohemia
- Mediators: George II of Hesse-Darmstadt
- Negotiators: (Holy Roman Empire) Trauttmansdorff; (Holy Roman Empire) von Senftenau; (Holy Roman Empire) von Gebhardt; von Döring; von Sebottendorf; von Oppel
- Original signatories: (Holy Roman Empire) Emperor Ferdinand II; John George I
- Signatories: Numerous
- Parties: (Holy Roman Empire) Emperor Ferdinand II; John George I
- Languages: German (Note: While most treaties of the period were written in Latin, German was used for agreements within the Holy Roman Empire)

The Peace of Prague, (Note: Czech: Pražský mír, German: Prager Frieden) dated 30 May 1635 Old Style, was a significant turning point in the Thirty Years' War. Signed by John George I, Elector of Saxony, and Ferdinand II, Holy Roman Emperor, the terms ended Saxony's support for the anti-Imperial coalition led by Sweden.

Other states within the Holy Roman Empire subsequently joined the treaty, and their exit was a key factor in Catholic France entering the war as an ally of Protestant Sweden. Although fighting continued until 1648, it is generally agreed Prague ended the war as primarily one of religion.

== Background ==
The Thirty Years' War began in 1618 when the Protestant Frederick V of the Palatinate, accepted the crown of Bohemia. Most members of the Holy Roman Empire viewed it as an internal dynastic dispute. With Bavarian support, Emperor Ferdinand quickly suppressed the Bohemian Revolt. Troops under Maximilian I, Elector of Bavaria invaded the Palatinate in 1622 and sent Frederick into exile. However, depriving a hereditary prince of his lands changed both the nature and the extent of the war.

Christian IV of Denmark invaded Northern Germany in support of his fellow Protestants until forced to withdraw in 1629. Success led Ferdinand to pass the Edict of Restitution, which required any property transferred since 1552 to be restored to its original owner, which was in nearly every case the Catholic Church. By effectively undoing the 1555 Peace of Augsburg, the edict forced moderate Protestants like John George of Saxony and George William of Brandenburg into opposition. That increased after 1627 by having a large Imperial army based on their lands, whose rarely-paid troops simply took what they wanted.

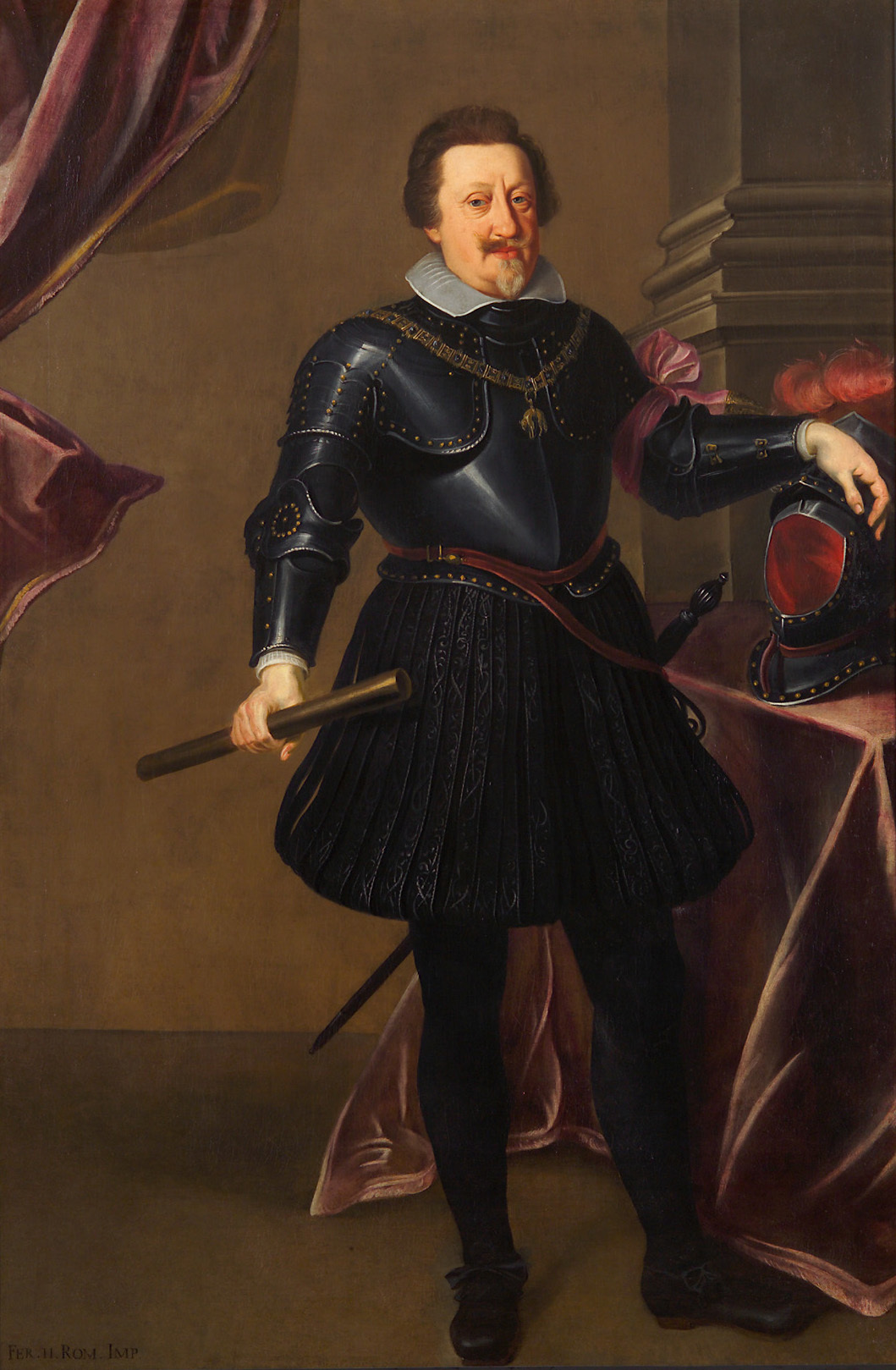
Emperor Ferdinand II, ca 1635

In 1630, Gustavus Adolphus of Sweden invaded Pomerania with money from France and support from Saxony and Brandenburg-Prussia. After his death at the Battle of Lützen (1632), Sweden formed the Heilbronn League. Funded by France and composed of smaller German Protestant states, the League won a number of victories until defeat at Nördlingen in 1634.

One result of Nördlingen was to highlight strategic differences between individual Heilbronn members. Sweden competed with Prussia and the Dutch Republic over the lucrative Baltic trade, and sought to retain its post-1630 acquisition of Swedish Pomerania. To strengthen its borders in the Rhineland and Low Countries, France supported the Dutch against the Swedes in the Baltic, and also backed Maximilian of Bavaria, a leader of the anti-Swedish Catholic League. Most of their German allies wanted to restore the territorial position of 1618, which implied reversing French and Swedish gains.

After 1632, Ferdinand accepted Catholicism could not be re-imposed by force and opened discussions on amending the Edict of Restitution in February 1633, eighteen months before Nördlingen. The execution of Imperial Commander Albrecht von Wallenstein in February 1634 removed a major obstacle since he had become an independent agent. With the Lutheran states of Denmark-Norway and Hesse-Darmstadt acting as mediators, the two parties agreed a preliminary draft in November 1634, known as the Pirnaer Noteln. Although subject to many corrections and revisions, this formed the basis of the 1635 agreement.

== Terms ==
The treaty was a bilateral agreement between Ferdinand and John George, and other states joined later. Negotiations took eight days and were held in Prague Castle, the site of the Defenestrations of Prague, which had begun the war in 1618. Its terms included the following;

- The Edict of Restitution was effectively revoked, and the date for returning properties was established as 12 November 1627. However, under the Reservatum ecclesiasticum, Protestant administrators of formerly Catholic prince-bishoprics and imperial abbeys were excluded from the Imperial Diet.
- Formal alliances between states within the Empire or with outside powers were prohibited, which led to dissolution of the Catholic and Heilbronn Leagues.
- In principle, the armies of the various states were unified into the Army of the Holy Roman Empire, but that proved almost impossible to enforce;
- A general amnesty was granted to those who had fought against Imperial troops, apart from descendants of former "Winter King" Frederick V of the Palatinate (1596–1632).

== Aftermath ==
=== Accessions ===
Many other states and rulers subsequently acceded to the treaty, including:

- 31 August 1635: George, Duke of Brunswick-Calenberg – Principality of Calenberg and Duchy of Brunswick-Lüneburg
- Electorate of Brandenburg
- Electorate of Mainz
- Ferdinand of Bavaria – Electorate of Cologne, Prince-Bishopric of Münster (the Chapter of Münster signed as a separate party), and Prince-Bishopric of Paderborn
- Franz von Hatzfeld – Prince-Bishopric of Bamberg
- George II, Landgrave of Hesse-Darmstadt – Landgraviate of Hesse-Darmstadt
- Saxe-Weimar
- Saxe-Gotha
- Duchy of Mecklenburg-Schwerin
- The princes of Anhalt
- Countess Katharine of Lippe-Detmold
- Count of Zweibrücken-Hanau
- Hanseatic League cities such as the Free City of Hamburg and the Free City of Bremen
- Several imperial cities such as
  - Erfurt (which never achieved imperial city status)
  - Free City of Frankfurt
  - Imperial City of Memmingen
  - Free Imperial City of Nuremberg
  - Free Imperial City of Ulm
- Electorate of Bavaria

Some exceptions:

- Calvinist William V, Landgrave of Hesse-Kassel initially also acceded to the Peace of Prague but in 1636 concluded an alliance with France instead, which earned him an imperial ban.
- The Imperial City of Strasbourg did not accede to the treaty.
- The Duchy of Württemberg was explicitly excluded from the treaty.

=== Imperial restoration and territorial changes ===
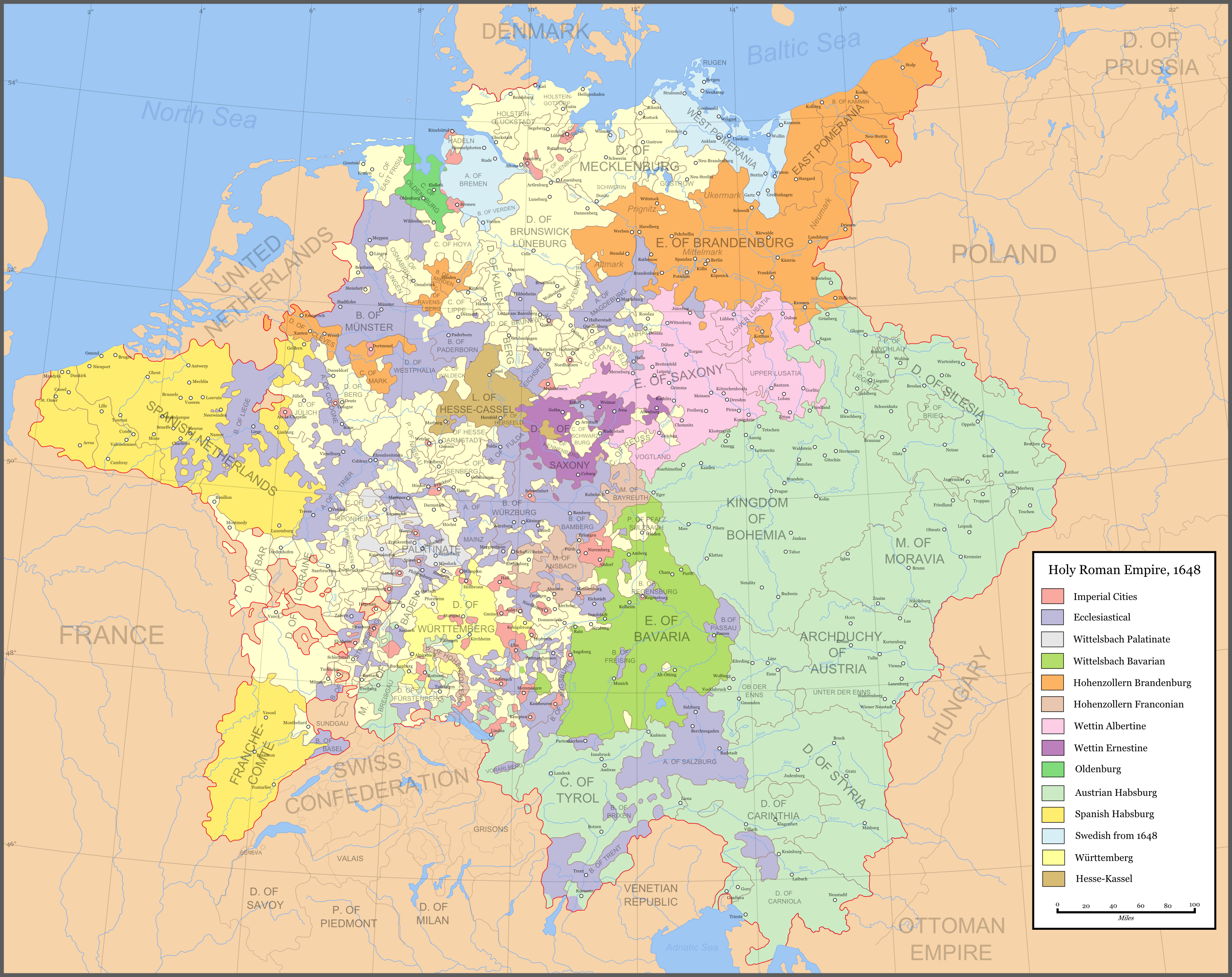
Holy Roman Empire 1648; its complexity presented opportunities for external powers.

Some of the states that later acceded to the Peace of Prague received minor concessions: Brandenburg-Prussia was confirmed as holder of Farther Pomerania, previously a possession of the last Duke Bogislaw XIV.

In 1623, Saxony occupied the Bohemian crown lands of Lower and Upper Lusatia in return for its support during the Bohemian Revolt. Under the Traditionsrezess annex of 1636, Ferdinand ceded both territories in perpetuity, plus the towns of Jüterbog, Dahme and Burg Querfurt. John George also received the Archbishopric of Magdeburg and Halberstadt, after agreeing not to secularise them; these were transferred to Brandenburg-Prussia in 1648.

While Ferdinand continued the Counter-Reformation in his own lands, it is generally agreed the Peace of Prague ended it as an internal religious conflict and re-established the principle of cuius regio, eius religio. By renouncing their right to create alliances and handing over control of armed forces, the Imperial estates, in return, acknowledged the supremacy of the Emperor.

=== Continuation of wars ===
However, those principles were not universally followed and hostilities continued. They included internal struggles between Imperial states, such as the Hessian War, as well as intervention by foreign powers. The war expanded on 19 May 1635, when France declared war on Spain, and entered the Thirty Years' War as an active belligerent. While his elder brother William, Duke of Saxe-Weimar joined the Peace, Bernard of Saxe-Weimar and his army were employed by France against Spanish possessions in Lorraine and in the Rhineland. In 1642, Sweden won a decisive victory at Breitenfeld, and overran Saxony. Many German states responded by shifting towards neutrality, and negotiating independently from the Emperor. The various parties fought on in the hope of improving their position, and peace was not finally achieved until the Peace of Westphalia in 1648.

== Sources ==
- Asbach, Olaf; Schröder, Peter (2014). The Ashgate Research Companion to the Thirty Years' War. Ashgate. ISBN 978-1409406297.
- Espenhorst, Martin (2016). "The Peace of Prague – A Failed Settlement?". The Ashgate Research Companion to the Thirty Years' War. Ashgate. ISBN 9781317041344.
- Bireley, Robert (2003). The Jesuits and the Thirty Years War: Kings, Courts, and Confessors. Cambridge University Press. ISBN 978-0521820172.
- Bireley, Robert (1976). "The Peace of Prague (1635) and the Counterreformation in Germany". The Journal of Modern History. 48 (1): 31–69. doi:10.1086/241519. S2CID 143376778.
- Engel, Gustav (1980). Politische Geschichte Westfalens (in German). Grote. ISBN 978-3774564428.
- Knox, Bill (2017). Tucker, Spencer (ed.). Enduring Controversies in Military History Volume I: Critical Analyses and Context. Greenwood Press. ISBN 978-1440841194.
- Onnekink, David; Rommelse, Gijs (2019). The Dutch in the Early Modern World: A History of a Global Power. Cambridge University Press. ISBN 978-1107125810.
- Wedgwood, CV (2005). The Thirty Years War. New York Review of Books. ISBN 978-1590171462.
