= Battle of Dessau Bridge =

1626 battle of the Thirty Years' War

Coordinates: 51°53′01″N 12°14′12″E

- Part of the Thirty Years' War
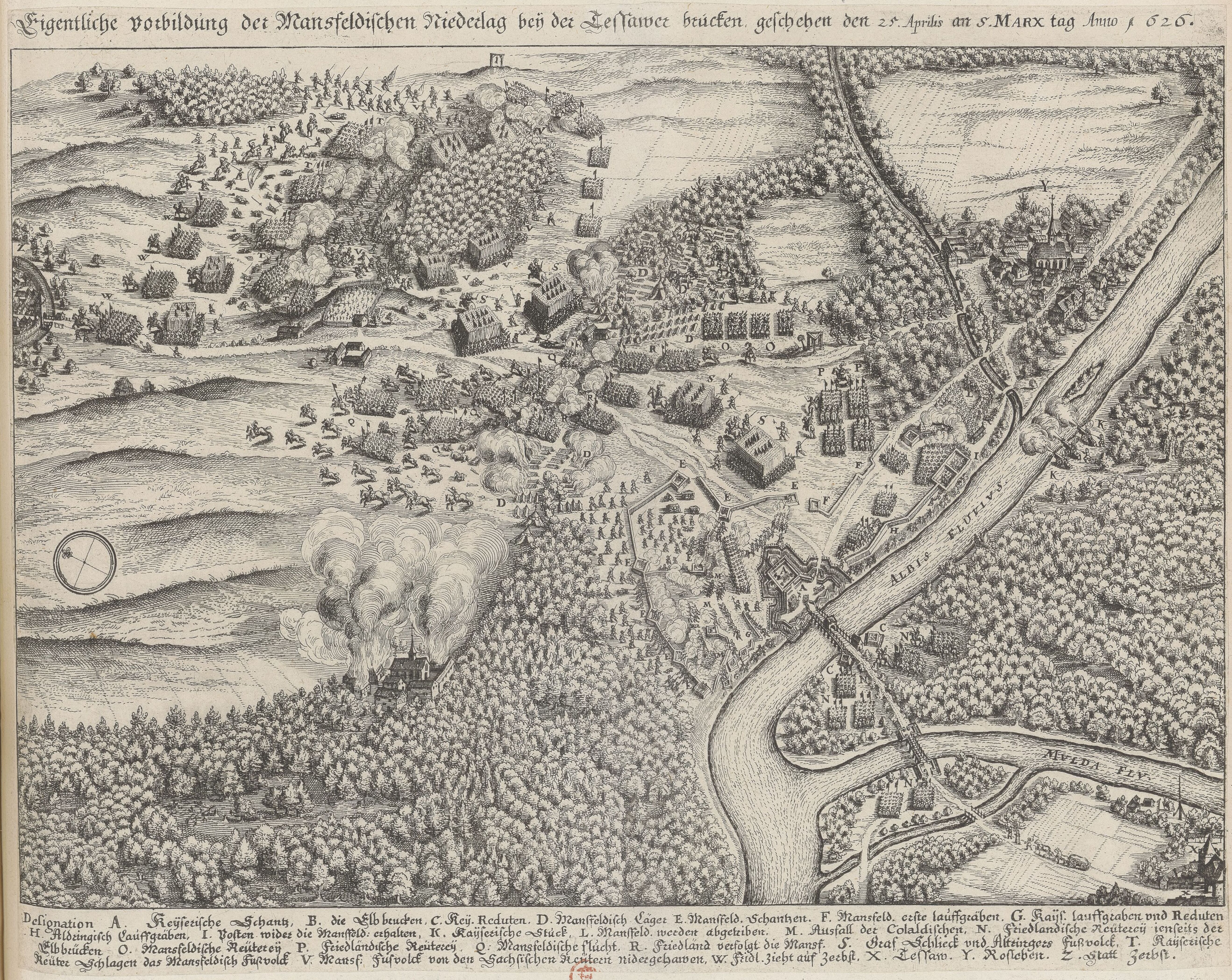
- A map of the Battle of Dessau Bridge
Date	25 April 1626
Location	Dessau, Duchy of Anhalt-Dessau present-day Saxony-Anhalt, Germany
Result	Catholic victory

Belligerents
Denmark–Norway	Holy Roman Empire; Catholic League

Commanders and leaders
(Denmark–Norway) Ernst von Mansfeld (Denmark–Norway) Christian William of Brandenburg	(Holy Roman Empire) Albrecht von Wallenstein (Holy Roman Empire) Torquato Conti (Holy Roman Empire) Johann von Aldringen

Strength
12,000	20,000

Casualties and losses
4,000 dead, wounded, or captured	2,000

The Battle of Dessau Bridge (German: Schlacht bei Dessau) was a significant battle of the Thirty Years' War between Danish Protestants and the Imperial German Catholic forces on the Elbe River outside Dessau, Germany on 25 April 1626.

This battle was an attempt by Ernst von Mansfeld to cross the Dessau bridge in order to invade the headquarters of the Imperial Army in Magdeburg, Germany. The Dessau bridge was the only land access between Magdeburg and Dresden, which made it difficult for the Danes to advance. The Count of Tilly wanted control of the bridge in order to prevent King Christian IV of Denmark from having access to Kassel and to protect the Lower Saxon Circle. The Imperial German forces of Albrecht von Wallenstein handily defeated the Protestant forces of Ernst von Mansfeld in this battle.

== Preparation for battle ==
Albrecht von Wallenstein began his preparation in October and November 1625 by settling in the Halberstadt-Aschersleben area and extending its borders. Wallenstein and the growing Imperial Army were informed of the approach of Mansfeld and his Danish army. King Christian IV of Denmark had formally entered Denmark into the Thirty Years War. As Mansfeld and his army was commanded to approach Albrecht von Wallenstein at the Dessau Bridge, King Christian IV of Denmark and ally Christian of Brunswick were commanded to fight the Catholic army of the Count of Tilly in Upper Austria. Christian of Brunswick's engagements at Fleurus, Höchst in 1622, and the Battle of Stadtlohn in 1623 were not victorious, and the battles diminished his force. Christian of Brunswick and his peasant Protestant army, backing the army of King Christian of Denmark, was soon eliminated by the Catholics due to the weakness of his army and lack of a supporting army from Landgrave when moving into Hesse. Part of the Imperial Army, under the command of Johann von Aldringen, had time to prepare heavy artillery and troops for any Protestant threat advancing down the Elbe. Wallenstein and the Imperial Catholic league marched to Dessau, where Mansfeld and the Protestant army would inevitably try to cross in order to reach Magdeburg and the German Catholic League headquarters in Aschersleben. In Vienna, there was talk of Wallenstein's deposition from his army and replacement by the Italian Count Collalto, an expert in the art of mercenary leadership.

== Battle and outcome ==
In April 1626, Mansfeld and his army moved as quickly as possible to Dessau, as did Wallenstein and the Imperial Army. Aldringen and his men arrived first, thus allowing them to form their "death trap" at the Dessau Bridge, deploying the heavy artillery which they possessed. Due to Wallenstein's inexperience, Mansfeld was overly confident and underestimated his enemy as his army approached. Mansfeld was not aware that they were soon to face the most powerful army along the Elbe. On 25 April, the battle began and Aldringen's troops of held off Mansfeld's men as they attempted to push across the bridge and river. The Imperial army soon arrived in force. Mansfeld and his troops were completely overpowered. Once nearly half of Mansfeld's army had been destroyed, the Danes retreated to Silesia. Christian IV's army was defeated by the Count of Tilly in the Battle of Lutter, which left Tilly with the lands of Holstein, Jutland, and Schleswig.
