= Johann von Aldringen =

Austrian nobleman and soldier (1588–1634)

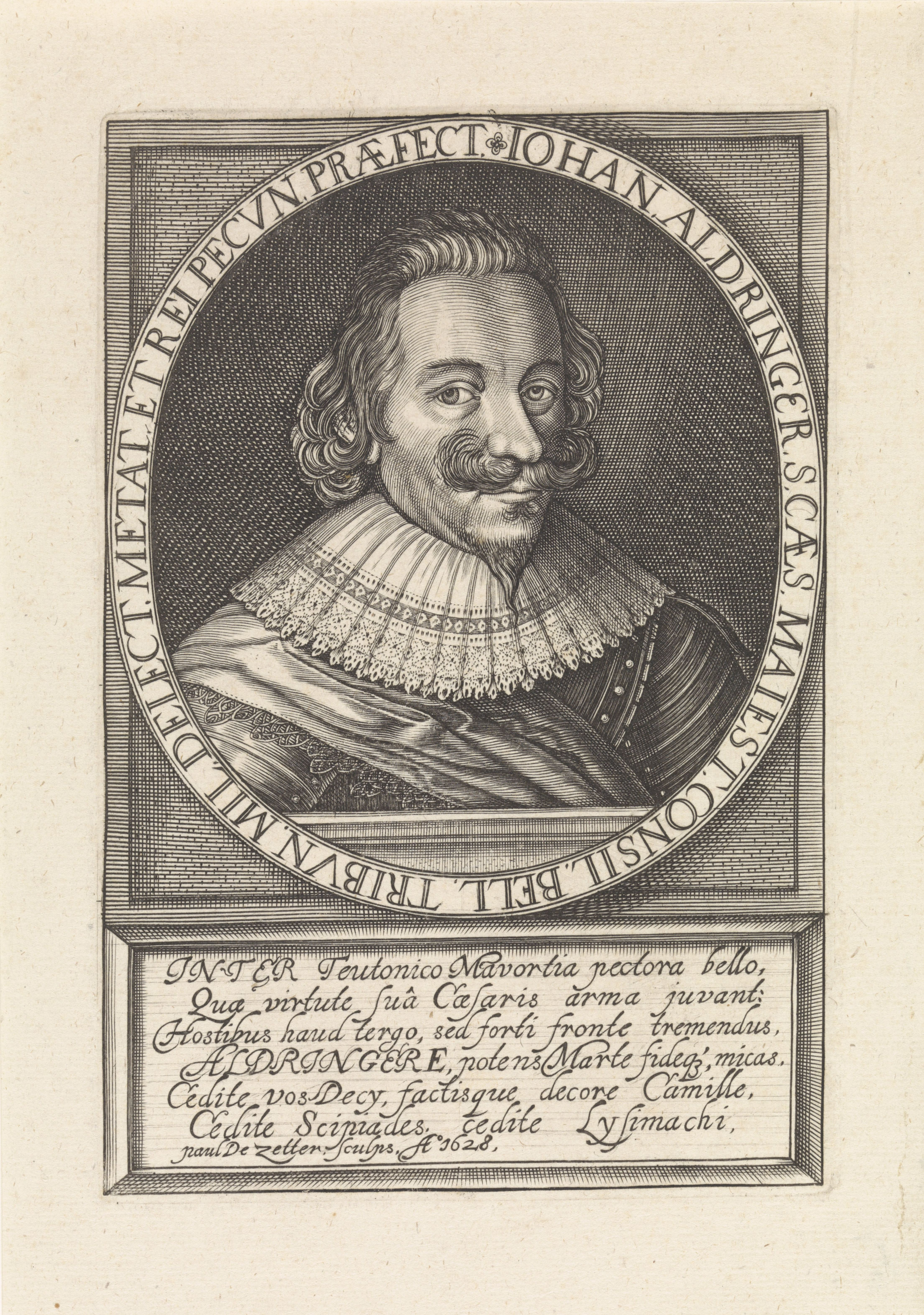
Johann von Aldringen

Johann Reichsgraf von Aldringen (sometimes spelled Altringer or Aldringer; 10 December 1588 – 22 June 1634) was a Luxemburger who served in the armies of the Spanish Habsburgs and later the Austrian Habsburgs, especially during the Thirty Years' War.

== Biography ==
He was born in Luxembourg in the Duchy of Luxembourg. After travelling as a nobleman's page in France, Italy, and the Netherlands, he attended the University of Paris.

In 1606 he entered the service of Spain, in which he remained until 1618, when he joined the imperial army. Here he distinguished himself in the field and in the cabinet. Made a colonel in 1622, two years later he was employed on the Council of War and on diplomatic missions. At the Battle of Dessau Bridge in 1626 he performed very distinguished service against Ernst von Mansfeld. He and his constant comrade Matthias Gallas were ennobled on the same day, and in the course of the Italian campaign of 1630 the two officers married the two daughters of Count d'Arco.

Aldringen served as Count Rambold Collalto's major-general in this campaign and was present at the taking of Mantua on 18 July 1630 during the War of Mantuan Succession. The plunder of the duke of Mantua's treasures made Gallas and Aldringen wealthy men. Back in Germany in 1631, he served after Breitenfeld as Tilly's artillery commander, and, elevated to the dignity of count of the Empire, he was present at the Battle of the Lech, where he was wounded.

When Tilly died of his wounds Aldringen succeeded to the command. Made field-marshal after the assault of the Alte Veste near Nuremberg, at which he had been second in command under the Duke of Friedland, Albrecht von Wallenstein (with whom he was a great favourite), he was next placed at the head of the corps formed by Duke Maximilian I of Bavaria to support Wallenstein. In this post his tact and diplomatic ability were put to a severe test in the preservation of harmony between the two dukes. Finally Count Aldringen was won over by the court party which sought to displace the too successful Duke of Friedland. After Wallenstein's death Aldringen commanded against the Swedes on the Danube, until he was killed in battle at Landshut on 22 July 1634. His considerable estate descended to his sister, and thence to the family of Clary and Aldringen.
