= Heilbronn League =

Anti-Imperial alliance between France, Sweden and Western German Allies

- 1633–1635
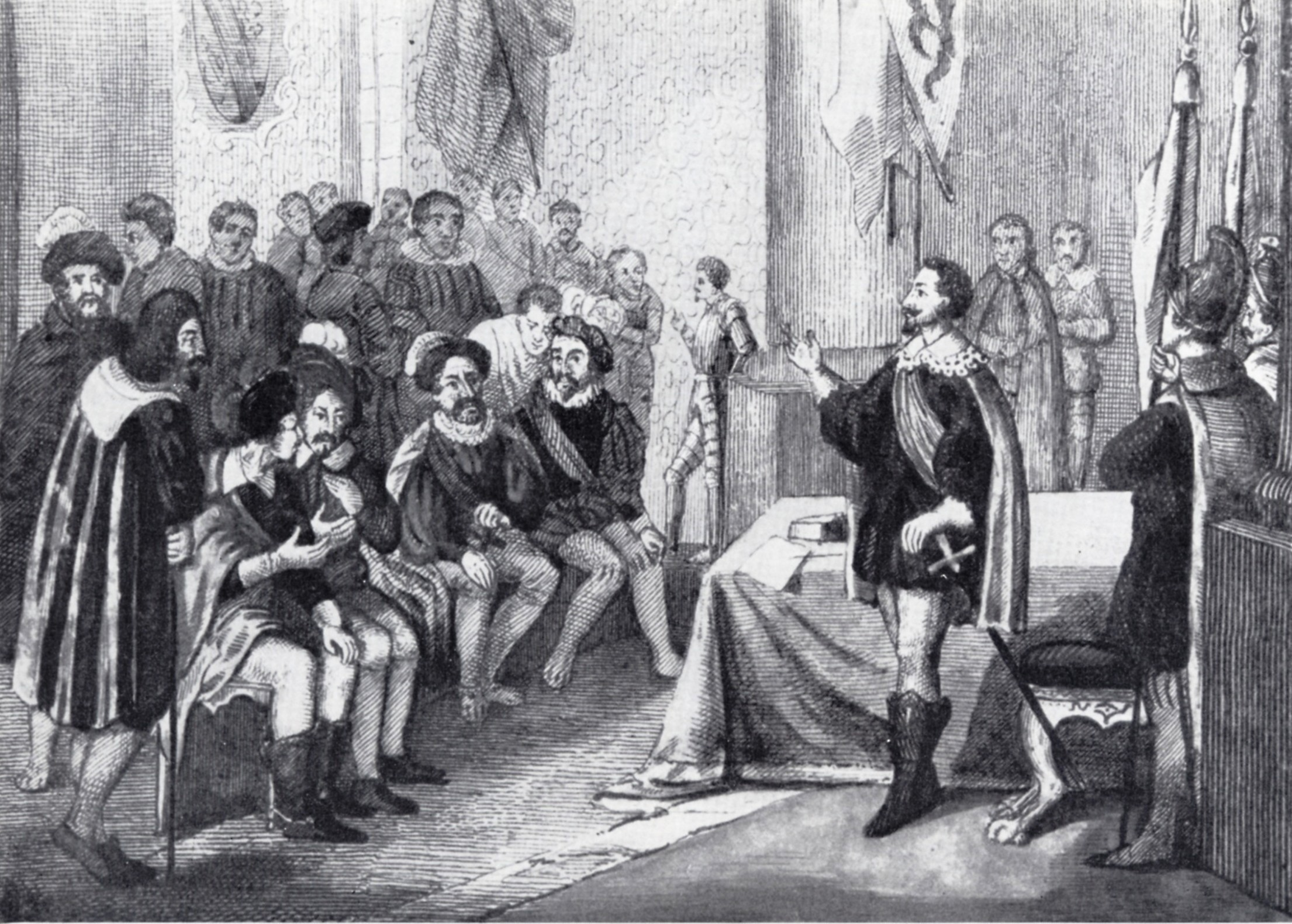
- Founding of the Heilbronn League, April 1633
- Common languages: French and German
- League Director
  - 1633–1635: Axel Oxenstierna
- Historical era: 1633 to 1635
  - Established: 23 April 1633
  - Dissolved, following the Peace of Prague: 30 May 1635

The Heilbronn League (German: Heilbronner Bund) was an anti-Imperial alliance formed in the Free Imperial City of Heilbronn, on 23 April 1633, during the Thirty Years' War. Led by Sweden, it brought together various Protestant states in western and southern Germany. It was supported by Saxony and Brandenburg-Prussia, although they were not members.

Established following the death of Gustavus Adolphus of Sweden at Lützen, in November 1632, it was directed by Sweden, with France providing financial support. Despite competing priorities and objectives, the League achieved considerable success, before its defeat at Nördlingen in November 1634.

This provided an opportunity for Emperor Ferdinand to negotiate with his Protestant opponents. The Peace of Prague largely ended conflict between members of the Holy Roman Empire, and the League was dissolved. However, fighting in Germany continued until 1648, much of it driven by foreign powers including France, Sweden, the Dutch Republic and Spain.

== Background ==
The death of Gustavus Adolphus of Sweden at Lützen, November 1632

Many German Protestants remained neutral in the early stages of the Thirty Years' War, which began in Bohemia, then expanded after 1620 into the Palatinate.

This changed in 1629, when Emperor Ferdinand passed the Edict of Restitution, requiring any property transferred since 1552 to be returned to its original owners. In nearly every case, this meant from Protestant to the Catholic Church, effectively undoing the settlement agreed in the 1555 Peace of Augsburg.

In addition, instead of paying wages, Ferdinand allowed his armies to plunder any territories they passed through, including those of his allies.

The combination led Saxony and Brandenburg-Prussia to join Gustavus Adolphus of Sweden, when he invaded the Empire in 1630. Swedish intervention was a mixture of religious support for fellow Protestants, and acquiring Swedish Pomerania in order to control the lucrative Baltic trade. It was financed by France, concerned by Imperial gains on its eastern border in the Rhineland.

The coalition won a series of battles against the German Catholic League, culminating in November 1632 with Lützen, in the modern German state of Saxony-Anhalt. Although generally held to be a Protestant victory, the death of Gustavus Adolphus weakened their cause overall.

== Formation and objectives ==
Imperial Circles, pre-1648; note Burgundian Circle at top, later split into Dutch Republic and the Spanish Netherlands

As Gustavus was succeeded by his six-year-old daughter Christina, chancellor Axel Oxenstierna took over direction of policy.

After ensuring control of the army, his next step was replacing the previous loose alliance with a more formal structure; this was driven by a perceived need to stabilise the Swedish state and doubts over the reliability of his allies.

Swedish Pomerania blocked Brandenburg's own commercial ambitions in the Baltic Sea, while Saxony's ruler, Elector John George, considered Sweden as great a threat as the Imperial armies.

After Lützen, John George proposed a summit of German Protestants in Dresden, to negotiate a pact of neutrality, while France suspended its subsidy payments to Sweden, and awaited developments. Advisors urged Ferdinand to take advantage of this and reverse the 1629 Edict, but he saw a chance to recoup his losses by military means and missed the opportunity.

In March, Oxenstierna invited members of the Upper Rhenish, Lower Rhenish–Westphalian, Swabian and Franconian Circles to Heilbronn. (Note: The Swabian Circle alone contained nearly 90 separate members, not all of whom participated.)

Although efforts to recruit the Hansa cities failed, the League was formed on 27 April 1633.

France resumed payment of subsidies on 7 April; crucially, these were paid direct to Sweden, assuring its control. Oxenstierna was appointed League Director, with an absolute veto over military affairs; he was supported by a council of ten advisors, three of whom were Swedes, the others being long-time supporters like Count Solms-Hohensolms. The members agreed to fund an army of 78,000, although in reality they provided less than a third of the money needed; the Germans agreed to continue fighting until Sweden obtained 'just compensation', while Oxenstierna promised to ensure a return to pre-1618 borders.

== Dissolution; Peace of Prague, 1635 ==
With limited support from Saxony and Brandenburg, the coalition won a series of victories against the Catholic League. Imperial victory at Nördlingen in 1634 re-established a military balance and gave Ferdinand another chance to make peace.

The League and its supporters had different priorities. To strengthen its borders in the Rhineland and the Low Countries, France supported the Dutch, Swedish competitors in the Baltic, and agreed the May 1631 Treaty of Fontainebleau with Maximilian of Bavaria, Ferdinand's ally and Sweden's opponent in the Rhineland campaign of 1633–34.

Sweden sought to preserve its grip on the Baltic Sea and retain Swedish Pomerania. Their German allies wanted to restore the territorial position of 1618, effectively negating gains by France and Sweden.

By the end of 1633, Ferdinand had accepted Catholicism could not be re-imposed by force. With the Lutheran states of Denmark-Norway and Hesse-Darmstadt acting as mediators, in November 1634, he agreed a preliminary draft with John George, known as the 'Pirnaer Noteln'. While subject to many corrections and revisions, this became the basis of the 1635 Peace of Prague, which dissolved the Catholic and Heilbronn leagues.

== Sources ==
- Asbach, Olaf; Schröder, Peter (2014). The Peace of Prague in The Ashgate Research Companion to the Thirty Years' War. Ashgate. ISBN 978-1409406297.
- Brzezinski, Richard (2001). Lützen 1632; climax of the 30 Years War. Osprey. ISBN 9781855325524.
- Knox, Bill (2017). Tucker, Spencer (ed.). The Peace of Prague; a failed settlement? in Enduring Controversies in Military History Volume I: Critical Analyses and Context. Greenwood Press. ISBN 978-1440841194.
- O'Connell, Daniel Patrick (1968). Richelieu. Weidenfeld & Nicolson.
- Riches, Daniel (2012). Protestant Cosmopolitanism and Diplomatic Culture: Brandenburg-Swedish Relations in the Seventeenth Century (Northern World). Brill. ISBN 978-9004240797.
- Wedgwood, CV (1938). The Thirty Years War (2005 ed.). New York Review of Books. ISBN 978-1590171462.
- Wilson, Peter (2009). Europe's Tragedy. Penguin. ISBN 978-0141006147.
