= Battle of Lützen (1632) =

Battle of the Thirty Years' War

- Part of the Thirty Years' War
- Death of Gustav II Adolph at the Battle of Lützen; Carl Wahlbom, 1855
Date	16 November 1632
Location	Lützen, Saxony-Anhalt, Germany
Result	Swedish victory (Note: This is the general consensus, although it has also been described as a "marginal Imperial tactical victory")

Belligerents
Holy Roman Empire; Catholic League	(yes) Swedish Empire; Saxony; Hesse-Kassel

Commanders and leaders
(Holy Roman Empire) Wallenstein; (Holy Roman Empire) Pappenheim (DOW); (Holy Roman Empire) Heinrich Holk	(Swedish Empire) Gustavus Adolphus †; (Swedish Empire) Bernard of Saxe-Weimar; (Swedish Empire) Knyphausen

Strength
19,175 total 43 guns	18,738 (Note: split 12,828 infantry, 5,910 cavalry); 60 guns

Casualties and losses
5,160 killed, wounded or taken prisoner, 24 guns captured	6,000 killed or wounded

The Battle of Lützen, fought on 16 November 1632, (Note: 6 November per the Julian calendar followed at the time in Sweden) was one of the most important of the Thirty Years' War. A Swedish army under Gustavus Adolphus, supported by troops from Saxony and Hesse-Kassel, narrowly defeated an Imperial force under Albrecht von Wallenstein. Both sides suffered heavy casualties, with Gustavus himself among the dead.

The battle began with a series of frontal attacks by the Swedish infantry, which nearly succeeded in breaking through before being repulsed with severe losses by Imperial cavalry under Pappenheim. Gustavus was killed as they fell back, but re-formed by his subordinates, his infantry overran the Imperial centre just before nightfall, supported by close range artillery fire. Wallenstein withdrew in good order, but was forced to abandon his wounded, many of his guns, and most of his supply train.

Despite the loss of their king, the Swedes continued the war under the direction of Axel Oxenstierna. Backed by French subsidies, in April 1633 Sweden formed the Heilbronn League with their German allies, and shortly afterwards won an important victory at Oldendorf. In February 1634, rumours Wallenstein was about to change sides resulted in his assassination by Imperial agents.

== Background ==
Swedish intervention in the Thirty Years' War began in June 1630 when nearly 18,000 troops under Gustavus Adolphus landed in the Duchy of Pomerania. Backed by French subsidies and supported by Saxony and Brandenburg-Prussia, he defeated Imperial armies at Breitenfeld in September 1631, then Rain in April 1632. However, this drew him deep into Southern Germany and Imperial general Albrecht von Wallenstein established himself at Fürth, threatening to cut his lines of communication to the north. On 3 September, an assault on the Imperial camp outside the town was bloodily repulsed, arguably the greatest blunder committed by Gustavus during his German campaign.

1632 campaign; key locations

After this success, Wallenstein joined Heinrich Holk in attacking Saxony, hoping to force John George I, Elector of Saxony, out of the war and obliging Gustavus to follow him. Leipzig was captured in early November and on 14 November Wallenstein decided to establish winter quarters there. However, the next day the Swedes learned Pappenheim's corps of 5,800 men had been detached and sent to Halle, leaving Wallenstein with between 13,000 and 15,000 men. (Note: split 4,800–5,800 cavalry, 8,200 infantry) Since this gave Gustavus and his 19,000 men numerical superiority, he decided to attack and quickly advanced from his base at Naumburg. As well as troops in Swedish service, his force included 850 from Hesse-Kassel and some 2,000 Saxons, although their main army was absent.

On the evening of 15 of November, the Swedish and German army camped in battle formation two kilometres outside Lützen, ready to attack next day. Advised of their movements by his scouts, Wallenstein ordered Pappenheim to return as quickly as possible. The latter set off with his cavalry just after midnight on 6 November, leaving the infantry to follow, while Wallenstein's troops worked through the night building defensive positions along the main Lützen-Leipzig road, also known as the Via Regia. The ground was mostly flat, except on the Imperial right, which Wallenstein anchored on a low hill next to three windmills, supported by his main artillery battery.

== Battle ==
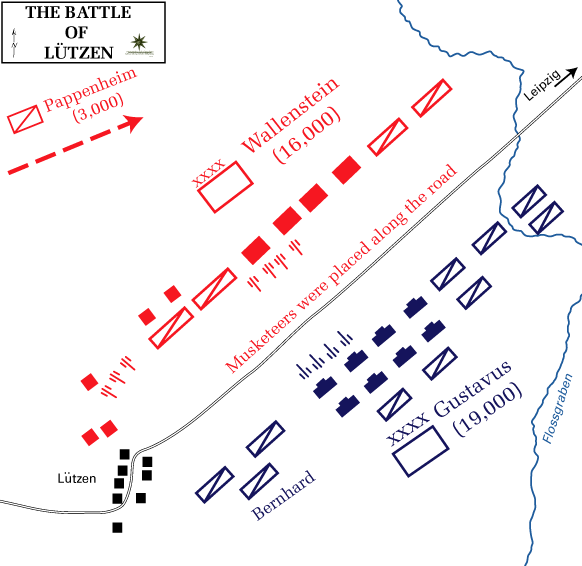
The Battle of Lützen; starting positions. Note Flossgraben canal, extreme right

The Swedish advance was hampered first by morning mist, (Note: Lützendimma, or "Lützen fog", is still used in Sweden to describe particularly heavy fog, although there is some debate as to whether it was actually caused by smoke from burning buildings in Lützen, which Wallenstein had ordered to be set on fire) then having to cross the Flossgraben canal (see Map). As a result, their attack did not begin until 11:00 am, a delay which gave Pappenheim time to reach the battlefield and negated the initial Swedish numerical superiority. Although Bernhard of Saxe-Weimar made little progress against Wallenstein's right, Gustavus overran a line of musketeers holding the ditch along the Lützen-Leipzig road, crossed it, then swung round to outflank the Imperial left. This was the situation around 12:00 pm when Pappenheim arrived on the battlefield with 2,300 cavalry.

He immediately charged and drove the Swedish infantry back across the road, with several elite units effectively wiped out or losing up to 65% of their strength. The Imperial troops also suffered heavy casualties, particularly among their senior officers, including Pappenheim, who was fatally wounded and died while being evacuated in a coach. At the same time, Holk launched a counterattack on the Swedish centre; by 13:00, both armies were losing cohesion and the battle degenerated into a confused series of firefights between opposing units.

By now, officers on both sides were trying to reorganise their troops, the smoke from the burning houses in Lützen blowing across the battlefield and making it almost impossible to see. While trying to rally his shattered infantry, Gustavus and his entourage got lost and ran into an Imperial cavalry unit; he was shot three times and fell dead from his horse, his body not recovered until after the fighting ended that evening. The Swedish reserve under Knyphausen managed to hold the line, providing time for their colleagues to reform and the fighting paused around 15:00.

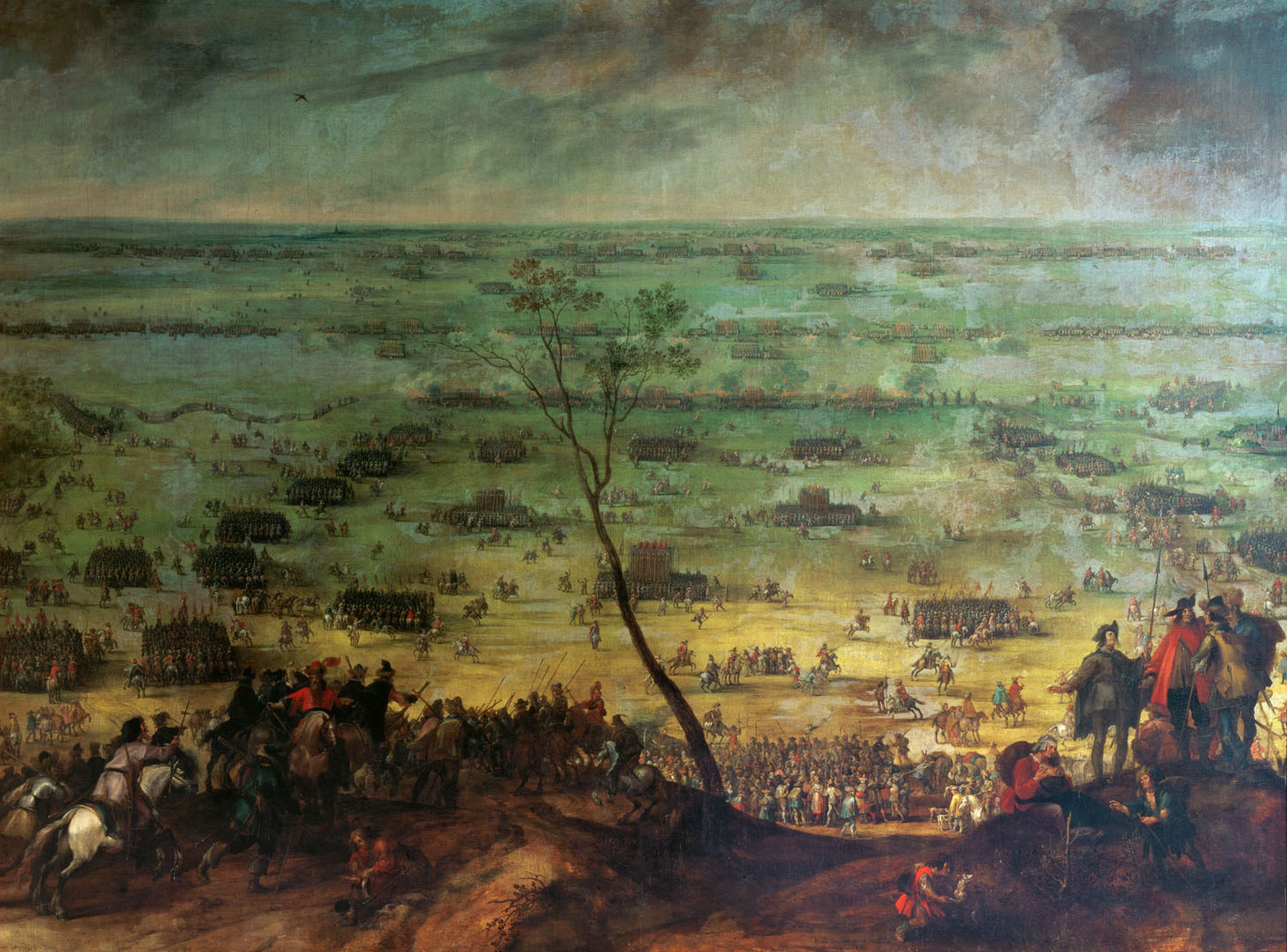
View from the Imperial side in Pieter Snayers' painting of the battle, commissioned by Imperial commander Ottavio Piccolomini.

Although news of Gustavus' death soon spread, Wallenstein himself refused to believe it, while many of his own troops were in equally bad shape. Much of Pappenheim's cavalry fled and told the infantry coming from Halle the battle was lost, although the latter continued marching towards Lützen. Several units looted their own baggage train, accompanied by camp followers who escaped on the horses needed to transport guns and supply wagons.

There are few reliable eyewitness accounts for the second phase of the battle and events are thus harder to reconstruct. One suggestion is Knyphausen advised retreat but when Bernhard of Saxe-Weimar continued his attack on the Imperial left, he moved his troops forward and crossed the Via Regia once again. As they did so, they captured the small battery in the centre (see Battle Map) and used it to fire on the Imperial left, which slowly withdrew out of range. Around 16:00, Bernard of Saxe-Weimar finally over-ran Lützen, then seized the main Imperial battery next to the windmills which were turned on his retreating opponents.

By 17:00 and with dusk falling, fighting subsided as Wallenstein ordered his troops to retire, abandoning his guns and baggage. After marching all day, Pappenheim's infantry, about 2,900 strong, arrived on the battlefield after nightfall; they wished to counterattack but instead Wallenstein ordered them to cover his retreat into Leipzig. The Swedes were finally able to recover the body of their king from under a heap of corpses on the Imperial side of the ditch which had been the scene of bitter fighting throughout the day.

== Aftermath ==
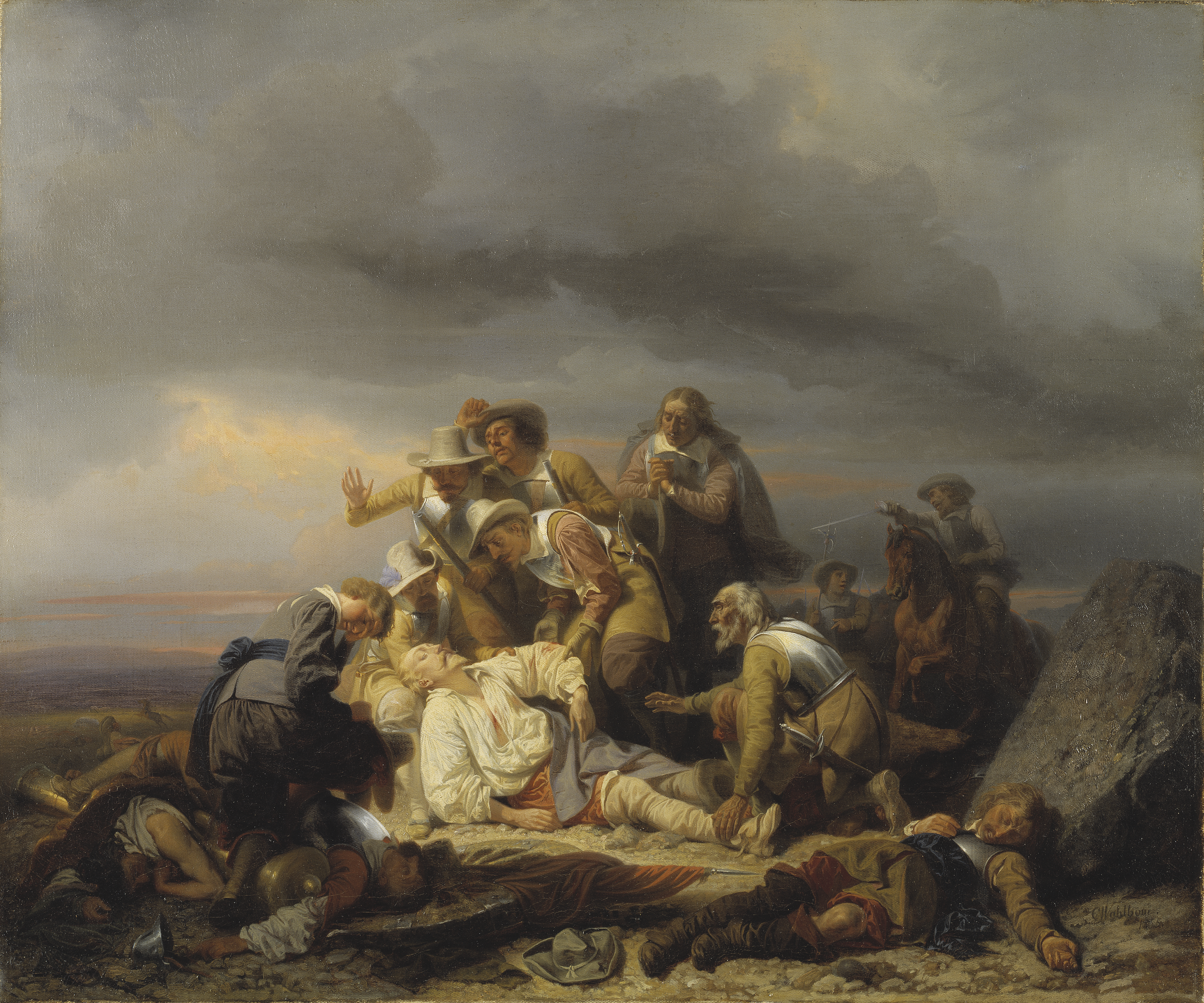
Finding the body of Gustavus Adolphus after the Battle of Lützen by Carl Wahlbom.

While Imperial casualties of 5,160 killed or wounded were slightly lower than Swedish losses of around 6,000, it was still nearly one-third of the Imperial army's force. Wallenstein decided he could not hold Leipzig and withdrew into Bohemia, leaving behind over 1,200 wounded, who were taken prisoner. During this retreat, the Imperials were harassed by Saxon peasantry angry at the destruction of their crops and suffered significant additional casualties. His retreat allowed the Swedes to claim Lützen as a victory, a view with which most historians agree, although it can also be seen as a marginal Imperial victory.

Although the death of Gustavus caused dismay at home and within the wider European Protestant community, his allies were more ambivalent. French chief minister Cardinal Richelieu, whose financial subsidies funded the Swedish army, had increasingly clashed with Gustavus over strategic objectives. While there is no evidence for contemporary rumours that Richelieu was involved, his death cemented French leadership of the anti-Habsburg alliance. Saxony and Brandenburg had grown disillusioned with the Swedish alliance, which led to heavy loss of civilian life from plague and starvation, while the occupation of Swedish Pomerania threatened their own interests in the Baltic trade.

Since Gustavus was succeeded by his six-year-old daughter Christina, direction of policy was taken over by the Privy Council of Sweden, headed by Axel Oxenstierna. Appointed Chancellor in January 1633, he decided Sweden could gain adequate compensation for its investment only by continuing the war. After ensuring control of the army, he next moved to replace the previous loose alliance with a more formal structure, largely driven by doubts over the reliability of his allies.

Richelieu resumed payment of subsidies to Sweden on 7 April and on 27 April, Sweden and its German Protestant allies formed the Heilbronn League. Oxenstierna was appointed League Director, with an absolute veto over military affairs, supported by a council of ten advisors, three of whom were Swedes. Its members agreed to support an army of 78,000 men, although they provided less than a third of the money needed; the balance was paid by France to Sweden directly, ensuring control over the League. The German states agreed to continue fighting until Sweden obtained "just compensation," while Oxenstierna promised them a return to pre-1618 borders. In July, the coalition defeated an Imperial army under von Gronsfeld at Oldendorf; Wallenstein's alleged refusal to support his colleague and rumours he was contemplating switching sides led to his removal and assassination by Imperial agents in February 1634.

== Legacy ==
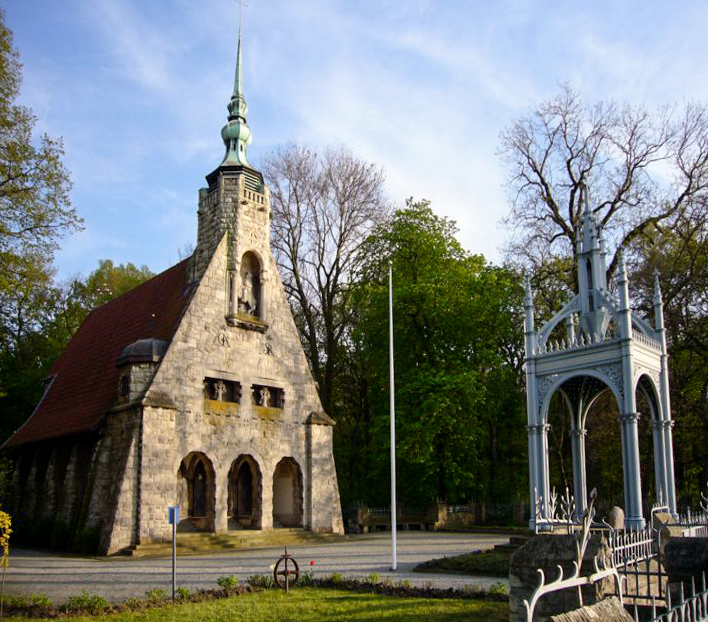
Gustavus Adolphus memorial at Lützen

The day after the battle, a granite boulder was placed near the spot where Gustavus Adolphus fell, known as the Schwedenstein; in 1832, an iron canopy was erected over the stone, with a chapel built nearby in 1907. The battle was fought on 16 November according to the Gregorian calendar or 6 November according to the Julian calendar, which was then in use in Sweden. Despite adopting the Gregorian calendar in 1753, the Swedes still commemorate Gustavus Adolphus Day on 6 November each year.

In 2011, a mass grave containing the remains of 47 soldiers was found in an area where a Swedish unit known as the Blue Brigade was reportedly overrun by Pappenheim's cavalry. Examination of the remains showed the average age was 28, while evidence of healed injuries indicate they were veterans; more than half had been hit by gunfire, an unusually high number for this period.

== Sources ==
- Semchankov, Yan (2009). Тридцалетняя война [The Thirty Years' War] (in Russian). Moscow: Рейтар. ISBN 978-5-8067-0047-7.
- Brzezinski, Richard (2001). Lützen 1632: Climax of the Thirty Years War: The Clash of Empires. Osprey. ISBN 978-1-85532-552-4.
- Museum of Gothenburg. "The Death of Gustavus II Adolphus Swedish Historical Wallcharts". Swedish National Heritage Board.
- Nicklisch, Nicole; Ramsthaler, Frank; Meller, Harald (2017). "The face of war: Trauma analysis of a mass grave from the Battle of Lützen (1632)". PLOS ONE. 12 (5) e0178252. Public Library of Science, PLOS One. Bibcode:2017PLoSO..1278252N. doi:10.1371/journal.pone.0178252. ISSN 1932-6203. PMC 5439951. PMID 28542491.
- Porshev, Boris (2014). Тридцатилетняя война и вступление в нее Швеции и Московского государства [The Thirty Years' War and the entry of Sweden and the Moscow State] (in Russian). T8. ISBN 978-5-519-03225-4.
- Riches, Daniel (2012). Protestant Cosmopolitanism and Diplomatic Culture: Brandenburg-Swedish Relations in the Seventeenth Century (Northern World). Brill. ISBN 978-90-04-24079-7.
- Schürger, André (2015). The archaeology of the Battle of Lützen: An examination of 17th century military material culture (Thesis). University of Glasgow. OCLC 936224650.
- Wedgwood, C.V. (1938). The Thirty Years War (2005 ed.). New York Review of Books. ISBN 978-1-59017-146-2.
- Wilson, Peter H. (2009). Europe's Tragedy: A History of the Thirty Years War. Allen Lane. ISBN 978-0-7139-9592-3.
- Wilson, Peter H. (2018). Lützen: Great Battles Series. Oxford: Oxford University Press. ISBN 978-0-19-964254-0.
