= Ramboldo, Count of Collalto =

Italian commander

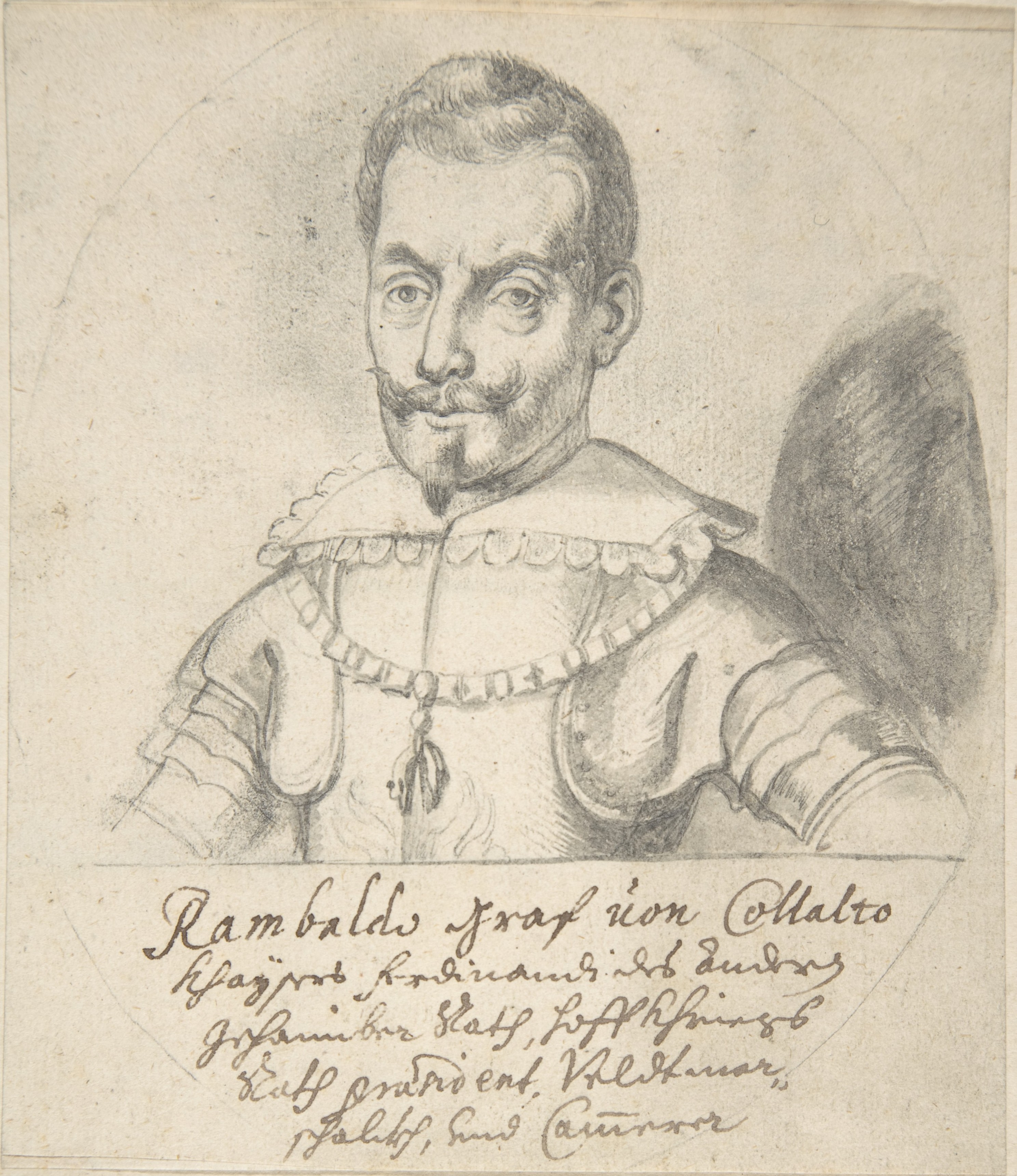
Rambaldo XIII, Count of Collalto, 1625

Ramboldo XIII, Count of Collalto (also Rambaldo; 21 September 1579 – 19 November 1630) was an Italian Imperial commander.

== Biography ==
Born at Mantua into an ancient noble House of Collalto, dating back to the 10th century, he was the son of Venetian general Antonio IV of Collalto. Expelled from the Republic of Venice, he joined the Imperial Army and reached the rank of colonel. In 1620 he was sent by Emperor Ferdinand II to Hungary, where he opposed very energetically the rebellions led by Gabriel Bethlen.

After being Imperial envoy in Rome and Madrid, he fought in 1623 under Johann Tserclaes, Count of Tilly on the Rhine and Main and became in 1624 head of the Imperial War Council in Vienna.

Made a Field Marshal, he received supreme command of the campaign in Northern Italy against Charles Gonzaga of Nevers during the War of Mantuan Succession. Already very sick, he was not present at the siege and sack of Mantua on 18 July 1630.

Charged of conspiring with Venice, he traveled to Vienna to defend himself, but died on the way in Chur, on 19 November 1630.
