= Battle of Breitenfeld (1631) order of battle =

Contemporary etching of troop disposition at the beginning of the Battle of Breitenfeld

The following units and commanders fought in the Battle of Breitenfeld of the Thirty Years War in 1631. Unless otherwise noted, all units have ten companies.

== Holy Roman Empire (Catholic) ==
Johann Tserclaes, Count of Tilly
Unless otherwise noted, all units are German.

=== Left ===
General Gottfried Heinrich Graf zu Pappenheim

- Bernstein Imperial Cuirassier (Veteran) - Colonel Wilhelm von Bernstein
- Merode-Waroux Imperial Cuirassier - Colonel Jean de Merode-Waroux (Walloon)
- Neusächsisch Imperial Cuirassier - Colonel Franz Albecht von Saxe-Lauenburg
- Piccolomini Imperial Cuirassier (Veteran) - General Ottavio Piccolomini
- Rangoni Imperial Cuirassier - Colonel Giulio Marchese Rangoni
- Strozzi Imperial Cuirassier (Veteran) - Colonel Giacomo Strozzi
- Trèka Imperial Cuirassier - Colonel Adam Erdmann Trčka of Lípa

=== Center ===
Gen. Otto Friedrich von Schönburg

- Baldiron-Dietrichstein Imperial Infantry - Colonel Antoni von Baldiron-Dietrichstein
- Blankart League Infantry - Colonel Otto Ludwig von Blankart
- Caffarelli Imperial Arquebusier (5 companies) - Colonel Francesco de Caffarelli (Walloon)
- Chiesa Imperial Infantry - Colonel Kaspar Francesco Chiesa
- Colloredo Imperial Arquebusier - Colonel Giovanni Battista von Colloredo
- Comargo-Reinach League Infantry - Colonel Hans Ludwig von Grotta
- Contreras Imperial Infantry - Gen. Alonso Guillén de Contreras
- Coronini Imperial Arquebusier - Colonel Johann P. Coronini von Cronberg
- Erwitte League Cuirassier - Gen. Dietrich Ottmar von Erwitte
- Fürstenberg Imperial Infantry - Colonel Egon VIII of Fürstenberg-Heiligenberg
- Gallas Imperial Infantry (Veteran) - Gen. Matthias Gallas
- Gonzaga Imperial Infantry - Colonel Hannibal M. von Gonzaga
- Geleen League Infantry (Veteran) - Colonel Gottfried Huyn von Geleen
- Göss Imperial Infantry - Colonel Max von Liechtenstein
- Hareaucourt Imperial Arquebusier Squadron (5 companies) - Colonel Henri Haraucourt de Faulquemont (Walloon)
- Holstein-Gottorp Imperial Infantry - Colonel Adolf von Holstein-Gottorp
- Montecuccoli Imperial Arquebusier - Colonel Ernesto Montecuccoli
- Pappenheim Imperial Infantry - Colonel Philipp von Pappenheim
- Savelli League Infantry (Veteran) - Colonel Federigo Savelli
- Tilly League Infantry (Veteran) - Johann Tserclaes, Count of Tilly
- Wahl League Infantry - Colonel Joachim Christian von Wahl
- Wangler Imperial Infantry (Veteran) - Colonel Johann von Wangler "the Elder"

=== Right ===
General Count Egon VIII of Fürstenberg-Heiligenberg

- Altsächsisch Imperial Cuirassier - Colonel Julius Henry of Saxe-Lauenburg
- Baumgarten League Cuirassier - Colonel Wilhelm von Baumgarten (Italian)
- Cronberg League Cuirassier (Veteran) - Colonel Adam Philip von Cronberg (Walloon)
- Schönburg League Cuirassier (Veteran) - Gen. Otto Friedrich von Schönburg
- Wengersky Imperial Cuirassier (10 companies + dragoon detachment) - Colonel Albrecht Wengersky

=== Skirmishers ===
- Isolano Irregular Light Horse - Colonel Johann Ludwig Hektor Isolano (Croatian and Hungarian)
- Independent Dragoon companies

=== Artillery ===
- Siege Pieces
- 10 demi-cannon
- Field Pieces
  - 16 quarter cannon
  - 7 Saxon quarter cannon (captured at Prague)

== Swedish-Saxon ==
=== Saxon forces ===
Prince John George I, Elector of Saxony

==== Left ====
General Hans Rudolf von Bindauf

- Bindauf Cuirassier Regiment (Raw) (8 companies) - Gen. Hans Rudolf von Bindauf
- Anhalt Cuirassier Squadron (Raw) (5 companies) - Colonel Ernst von Anhalt-Bernburg
  - Kurfürstin Hovfanna Independent Cuirassier Company (Raw)
- Hofkirchen Cuirassier Squadron (Raw) (5 companies) - Colonel Lorenz Hofkirchen
- Löser "Feudal Levy" Cuirasser Squadron (Raw) (6 companies) - Colonel Hans von Löser
- Saxe-Altenburg Cuirasser Regiment (Raw) (8 companies) - Johann Philipp, Duke of Saxe-Altenburg
- Pflugk "Feudal Levy" Cuirassier Regiment (Raw) (6 companies) - Colonel Bernhard von Pflugk

==== Center ====
Friedrich Wilhelm II, Duke of Saxe-Altenburg

- Arnim Infantry Regiment (Militia) - Marshal Hans Georg von Arnim-Boitzenburg
  - Independent Free (Detached Musketeer) Companies (3 companies)
- Klitzing Infantry Regiment (Militia) - Colonel Hans Kaspar von Klitzing
- Löser Infantry Regiment (Militia) - Colonel Hans von Löser
- Starschedel Infantry Regiment (Raw) - Colonel Moritz Dietrich von Starschedel
- Volfersdorf Household Foot Regiment - Colonel Siegmund von Wolfersdorf
- Bose Household Foot Regiment (8 companies) - Colonel Karl von Bose
- Kurfürst Infantry (Detached Musketeer) Companies (3 companies) - Colonel Johann Casimir von Schaumberg
- Pforte Household Foot Regiment (8 companies) - Colonel Johann von der Pforte
- Vitzthum Household Foot Regiment (8 companies) - Dam Vitzthum

==== Right ====
Marshal Hans Georg von Arnim-Boitzenburg

- Arnim Leibgarde Cuirassier Regiment (Veteran) (2 companies) - Marshal Hans Georg von Arnim-Boitzenburg
- Kurfürstin Cuirassier Regiment (Militia) (5 companies) - Colonel von Taube
- Steinau Cuirassier Regiment (Militia) (3 companies) - Colonel Wolf Adam von Steinau
- Kalckstein Cuirassier Regiment (Militia) - Colonel Albrecht von Kalckstein
- Wilhelm Leib Cuirassier Squadron (Militia) (5 companies) - Colonel Wilhelm Leib
- Saxe-Altenburg Cuirassier Regiment (Militia) - Friedrich Wilhelm II, Duke of Saxe-Altenburg

==== Artillery ====
- Siege Pieces
  - 12 quarter cannon

=== Swedish forces ===
Gustavus Adolphus of Sweden

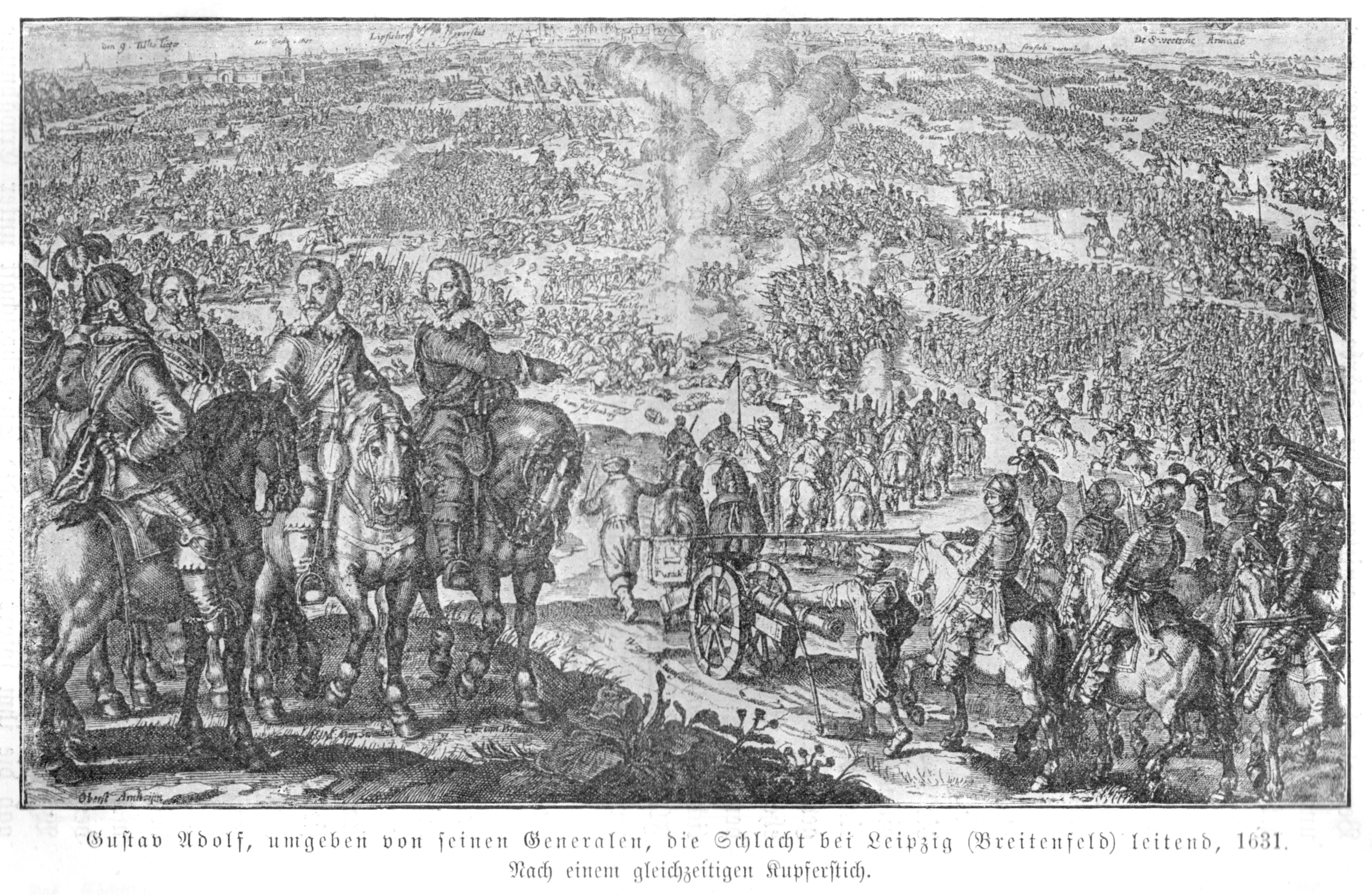
Gustavus Adolphus at the Battle of Breitenfeld

==== Left ====
Marshal Gustav Karlsson Horn

- Horn Cuirassier Regiment (8 companies) - Marshal Gustav Horn (German)
- Baudissin Cuirassier Regiment (12 companies) - Gen. Wolf Heinrich von Baudissin (German)
- Caldenbach Cuirassier Regiment (8 companies) - Colonel Moritz Pensen von Caldenbach (German)
- Courville Cuirassier Squadron (5 companies) - Colonel Nicholas de Courville (German)
- Hall Cuirassier Regiment (12 companies) - Colonel Adolf Theodor von Efferen-Hall
- Waldstein Infantry Regiment (8 companies) - Colonel Berthold von Waldstein (German)

==== Right ====
General Sir Johan Banér

- "Commanded" Musketeer Reserve (8 companies) - Gen. Johan Banér
- Rosen Infantry Regiment (12 companies) - Colonel Reinhold von Rosen (German)
- Finnish (Light) Horsemen (Veteran) (12 companies) - Gen. Åke Henriksson Tott (Finnish)
- Östergötland Horsemen (Veteran) (4 companies) - Colonel Claus Dietrich von Sperreuth (Swedish)
- Småland Horsemen (Veteran) (8 companies) - Fredrik Stenbock (Swedish)
- Västergötland Horsemen (Veteran) (8 companies) - Colonel Erik Soop (Swedish)
- Dāmitz Cuirassier Regiment (4 companies) - Colonel Sigfrid von Dāmitz (German)
- Courland Cuirassier Squadron (4 companies) - Colonel Ernst Dönhoff (Latvian)
- Livonia Cuirassier Regiment (5 companies) - Lieutenant Colonel Jürgen Aderkas (Estonian)
- Rheingreven Cuirassier Regiment (Veteran) (15 companies) - Otto Ludwig von Salm-Kyrburgh (German)
- 1st Squadron (Veteran) (4 companies) - Lieutenant Colonel Torsten Stålhandske (Swedish)
- 2nd Squadron (Veteran) (4 companies) - Colonel Reinhold Wunsch (Swedish)

==== Center ====
General Maximilian Teuffel

- "Yellow" Brigade - Gen. Maximilian Teuffel (Swedish and German)
  - "Yellow" (Gula) Infantry Regiment (12 companies) - Gen. Maximilian Teuffel (Swedish and German)
  - Chemnitz Infantry Squadron (4 companies) - Colonel Niklas von Chemnitz (German)
- Oxenstierna's Brigade - Colonel Åke Gustafsson Oxenstierna
  - Dalarna (Dalregementet) Infantry Regiment (Veteran) (7 companies) - Colonel Åke Gustafsson Oxenstierna (Swedish)
  - Uppland, Närke, and Värmland Infantry Regiment (Veteran) (8 companies) - Lieutenant Colonel Axel Lillie (Swedish)
  - Finnish Infantry Regiment (Veteran) (8 companies) - Colonel Klas Hastfer (Swedish)
- Hand's Brigade - Colonel Erik Hand
  - Östergötland Infantry Regiment (8 companies) - Colonel Erik Hand (Swedish)
  - Dalsland Infantry Squadron (4 companies) - Colonel Wilhelm von Salzburg (Swedish)
  - Västergötland Infantry Regiment (8 companies) - Colonel Karl Hård af Segerstad (Swedish)
- "Blue" Brigade - Gen. Hans Georg aus dem Winckel (German)
  - "Blue" Infantry Regiment (12 companies) - Gen. Hans Georg aus dem Winckel (German)
  - "Red" Infantry Regiment (12 companies) - Colonel Giesebrecht von Hegendorf (German)
- Scots Brigade - Colonel James Lumsdaine
  - Lumsdaine Infantry Regiment (Veteran) (8 companies) - Colonel James Lumsdaine (Scottish)
  - Mackay/Monro Infantry Regiment (Veteran) (8 companies) - Colonel Donald Mackay and Robert Monro (Scottish)
  - Ramsey Infantry Regiment (Veteran) (8 companies) - Colonel Sir James Ramsay (Scottish)
  - Hamilton Infantry Regiment (Veteran) (8 companies) - Colonel Sir John Hamilton (Scottish)
- Ortenburg Cuirassier Regiment (The King's "Life Regiment of Horse") - Colonel Johann Philip von Ortenburg (Latvian)

==== Center (Reserve) ====
General John Hepburn

- "Green" Brigade - Gen. John Hepburn (Scottish)
  - "Green" (Gröna) Infantry Regiment (8 companies) - Gen. John Hepburn (German)
  - Foulis Scottish Infantry Regiment (8 companies) - Lieutenant Colonel Robert Munro, 18th Baron of Foulis (Scottish)
  - Bock Musketeer Regiment (8 companies) - Colonel von Bock (German)
- Von Thurn's Brigade - General Heinrich Mathias von Thurn
  - "Black" Infantry Regiment (Veteran) (8 companies) - Gen. Heinrich Mathias von Thurn (German)
  - "Black" Infantry Regiment (8 companies) - Colonel Adolf Theodor von Efferen-Hall (German)
  - "White" Infantry Regiment (12 companies) - Colonel Sigfrid von Dārgitz (German)
- Vitzthum's Brigade - Colonel Johann Vitzthum von Ecksådt
  - "Orange" Infantry Regiment (8 companies) - Colonel Johann Vitzthum von Ecksådt (German)
  - Mitschefall Infantry Squadron (5 companies) - Colonel Wilhelm Kasper von Mitschefall (German)
  - John Ruthwenn Infantry Regiment (8 companies) - Lieutenant Colonel John Ruthven (German)
- Schaffman Cuirassier Squadron (4 companies) - Colonel Adam Schaffman (Czech/Silesian)
- Kochtitzky Horse (4 companies) - Colonel Andras Kochtitzky "the Younger" (Slav/Pomeranian)
- Taupadel Dragoon Squadron (4 companies) - Colonel Georg Christof von Taupadel (Train Guard)

==== Artillery ====
- Field Pieces - Colonel Lennart Torstensson
  - 12 quarter cannons (3 ahead of each front line brigade)
  - "Regimental" pieces
  - 42 minions
