= Iron and Blood (book) =

Noteworthy Book

Iron and Blood: A Military History of the German-Speaking Peoples Since 1500
- Author: Peter H. Wilson
- Language: English
- Subject: Military history, German history
- Publisher: Allen Lane (UK), Harvard University Press (US)
- Publication date: 2022 (UK), 2023 (US)
- Publication place: United Kingdom
- Media type: Print, e-book
- Pages: 976
- ISBN: 978-0-674-98762-3

Iron and Blood: A Military History of the German-Speaking Peoples Since 1500 is a 2022 book by British historian Peter H. Wilson. Published by Allen Lane in the United Kingdom and Harvard University Press in the United States, the book offers a comprehensive military history of the German-speaking world from the early modern period to the present day. The work aims to challenge simplified notions of German militarism by situating the military experience of German-speaking peoples in a broad, pan-European context.

== Overview ==
Wilson's work traces the military evolution of the German-speaking regions over five centuries, including the Holy Roman Empire, the Habsburg and Hohenzollern dynasties, Prussia, Imperial Germany, the Wehrmacht, and postwar armed forces such as the Bundeswehr. Rather than presenting a linear narrative of militarization, Wilson emphasizes the complexity and diversity of German military traditions, institutions, and cultural attitudes toward war.

This is part of a recent spate of books, that are variously titled with the words "blood" and "iron" in their title, albeit sometimes reversed—reflecting a common long standing and evolving linguistic meme.

== Structure ==
The book is divided into five parts, each consisting of three chapters that explore:

- Major political and military events
- The structure, recruitment, and command of armies
- Societal attitudes and the social role of military institutions

=== Part I: Balancing War and Peace ===
The early chapters examine the decentralized military structures of the Holy Roman Empire, focusing on regional warlords, the development of early modern armies, and the emerging professional identity of soldiers.

=== Part II: Accepting War as Permanent ===
This section analyzes the normalization of warfare from the Thirty Years’ War through the eighteenth century, including the rise of permanent armies and the fiscal and bureaucratic mechanisms that sustained them.

=== Part III: Professionalizing War ===
Wilson explores the increasing standardization of military practices in the 18th century and the growth of military professionalism under the Habsburg and Prussian states.

=== Part IV: Nationalizing War ===
The 19th century saw war tied more closely to national identity. Topics include the Napoleonic Wars, the German unification conflicts, and the integration of military service into broader nation-building efforts.

=== Part V: Democratizing War ===
The final section covers the 20th and 21st centuries, from World War I through World War II and into the Cold War and modern period. Wilson discusses both total war and the later demilitarization and reintegration of armed forces in democratic contexts.

== Reception ==
Iron and Blood has been praised by scholars and reviewers for its depth, ambition, and nuanced approach. Historians have noted its success in dispelling deterministic views of German militarism and for bringing a wide range of regional experiences into conversation. Its thematic structure and interdisciplinary lens have also been highlighted as strengths and historian Richard J. Evans claims that with this book, Wilson launched "a sustained attack" on notions of "teleological Prussocentrism." (Note: Prussocentrism is a Prussia-based subvariant of Eurocentrism—defined as the belief system that positions Europe as the central force in shaping world history, promoting universal values, and representing progress and development. It is closely linked to colonial violence and justifies the domination of non-European cultures through narratives of superiority and advancement.)

== Editions ==
- Wilson, Peter H. (2022). Iron and Blood: A Military History of the German-Speaking Peoples Since 1500. Allen Lane. ISBN 978-0241389674.
- Wilson, Peter H. (2023). Iron and Blood: A Military History of the German-Speaking Peoples Since 1500. Harvard University Press. ISBN 978-0-674-98762-3.

== See also ==
- Blood and Iron
- Machtpolitik
- Military history of Germany
- Sonderweg theory
