= Battle of Breitenfeld (1631) =

Part of the Thirty Years' War

Coordinates: 51°25′04″N 12°22′40″E

- Part of the Thirty Years' War
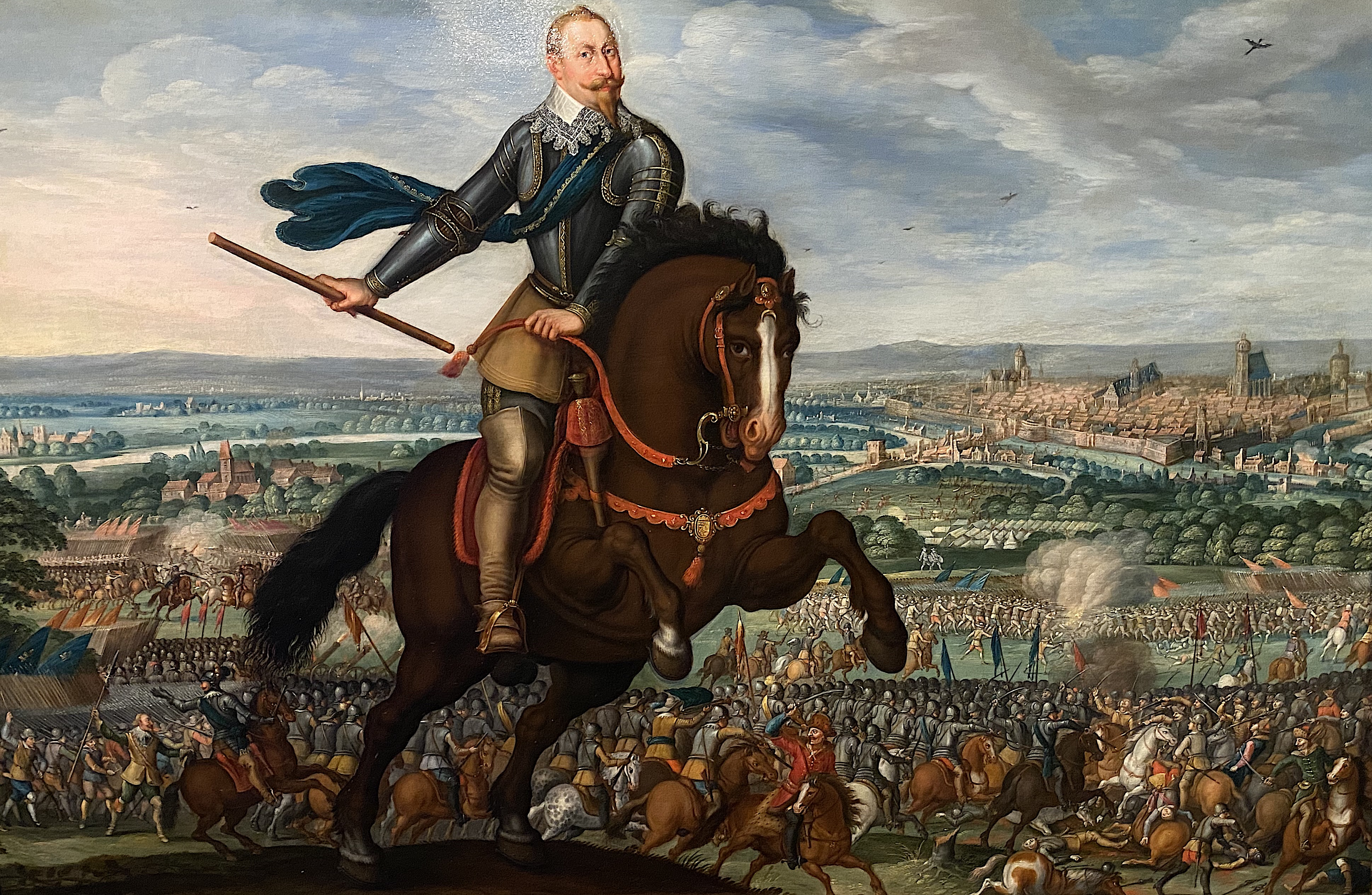
- Gustavus Adolphus at Breitenfeld
Date	17 September 1631
Location	Breitenfeld, Leipzig, Saxony, Germany
Result	Swedish-Saxon victory

Belligerents
Swedish Empire; Saxony	(Habsburg monarchy) Holy Roman Empire; Catholic League

Commanders and leaders
(Swedish Empire) Gustavus Adolphus; (Swedish Empire) Gustav Horn; (Swedish Empire) Johan Banér; (Swedish Empire) Lennart Torstensson; (Electorate of Saxony) Johann George I; (Electorate of Saxony) Hans Georg von Arnim	(Habsburg monarchy) Count of Tilly (WIA); (Habsburg monarchy) Gottfried zu Pappenheim (WIA); (Habsburg monarchy) Egon von Fürstenberg (WIA)

Units involved
See Order of Battle	See Order of Battle

Strength
40,150, (Note: 22,800 Swedes, 17,350 Saxons) 66 guns	31,400, (Note: 14,700 Imperial, 15,700 Catholic League, 1,000 irregulars) 27 guns

Casualties and losses
5,550 killed or wounded (Note: 3,550 Swedish, 2,000 Saxon)	7,000–8,000 killed 6,000 captured
- Location within Saxony Breitenfeld (Germany)

The Battle of Breitenfeld (Note: German: Schlacht bei Breitenfeld; Swedish: Slaget vid Breitenfeld, also known as the First Battle of Breitenfeld or Battle of Leipzig), 17 September 1631, took place during the Thirty Years' War outside Breitenfeld, Leipzig, in modern Saxony. In one of the most significant battles of the war, a combined Swedish-Saxon force defeated an army made up of Imperial and Catholic League troops.

Swedish intervention in the Thirty Years' War began in June 1630 when nearly 18,000 soldiers under Gustavus Adolphus landed in Pomerania. He made an alliance with John George I, Elector of Saxony, prompting an invasion of Saxony in early 1631 by Imperial troops led by Johann Tserclaes, Count of Tilly. The combined Swedish-Saxon force marched on Leipzig where Tilly was based.

At the start of the battle, the Saxon troops were routed by Tilly's cavalry, which then combined with his infantry in an attempt to envelop the Swedish army. The Swedes regrouped and launched a series of counterattacks, forcing Tilly to retreat with substantial losses. Victory allowed the Swedes to launch a campaign into southern Germany.

== Background ==
Swedish intervention in the Thirty Years' War began in June 1630 when Gustavus Adolphus landed in Pomerania with nearly 18,000 troops. He marched south along the Oder towards Szczecin and coerced Bogislaw XIV into an alliance which secured Swedish interests in Pomerania against his rival Sigismund. As a result, Sigismund turned his attention to Russia, initiating the 1632 to 1634 Smolensk War.

However, Swedish hopes of widespread German support largely failed, and by the end of 1630, their only new ally was Christian William whose capital Magdeburg was besieged by Tilly. Although the devastation inflicted by Imperial troops stationed in Saxony and Brandenburg made them sympathetic to Gustavus, both states had their own competing ambitions in Pomerania. Their caution was reinforced by previous experience, which showed inviting external powers into the Holy Roman Empire was easier than getting them to leave.

Gustavus put pressure on Brandenburg by sacking Küstrin and Frankfurt an der Oder, while the Sack of Magdeburg in May 1631 provided a powerful warning of the consequences of Imperial victory. Once again, Richelieu used French financial power to bridge differences between the Swedes and the German princes; the 1631 Treaty of Bärwalde provided funds for the Swedes and their Protestant allies, including Saxony and Brandenburg. These subsidies allowed Gustavus to increase the number of troops under his control to around 36,000.

== Battle ==
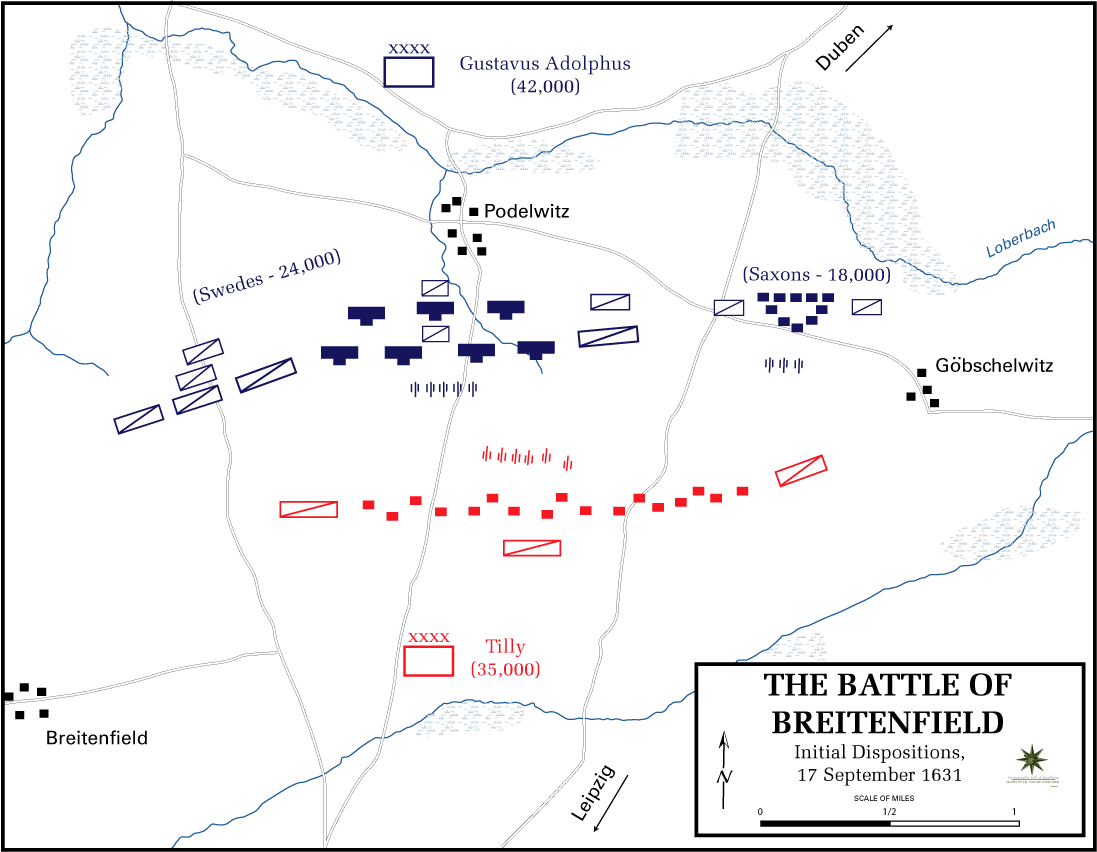
Order of battle for the Battle of Breitenfeld (1631)

The battle began at twelve o'clock with an exchange of artillery fire. Tilly's artillery concentrated their fire against the Saxon troops and the Swedish centre and left wing. The Saxons and Swedes returned fire with their own guns. It took some time before Torstenson's heavy artillery were brought into position to launch its own bombardment. The Swedes demonstrated firepower in a rate of fire of three to five volleys to one Imperial volley. Torstenson later changed direction to aim his guns more accurately against the enemy. Tilly's tercios were easy targets for Torstenson's guns, while the Swedish troops were much sparsely spread and stood "as firm as a wall". During the approximately two-hour long cannonade, about 1,000 Swedish soldiers were killed, about the same number of Saxon soldiers and about 2,000 Imperial-League soldiers. Colonel von Baumgarten was among the first to die from a Saxon cannonball.

Both forces on the battlefield remained stationary throughout the cannonade and refused to advance against their adversary. Tilly did not want to abandon the Galgenberg, whose advantageous position Gustavus Adolphus feared to attack. Furthermore, the gunpowder smoke from the cannons and the advance of the troops accumulated large clouds of dust and smoke, which with strong south-westerly winds blew straight into the faces of the Swedish soldiers. To circumvent this and attempt to get the wind on their side, the King ordered his right wing to pivot to the left. This movement was observed by both Tilly and Pappenheim. The latter's cavalry was struck hard by the heavy Swedish artillery fire. The impetuous Pappenheim wanted to immediately unleash his cavalry upon the Swedes, while the latter was busy regrouping their ranks.

=== Pappenheim's assault ===
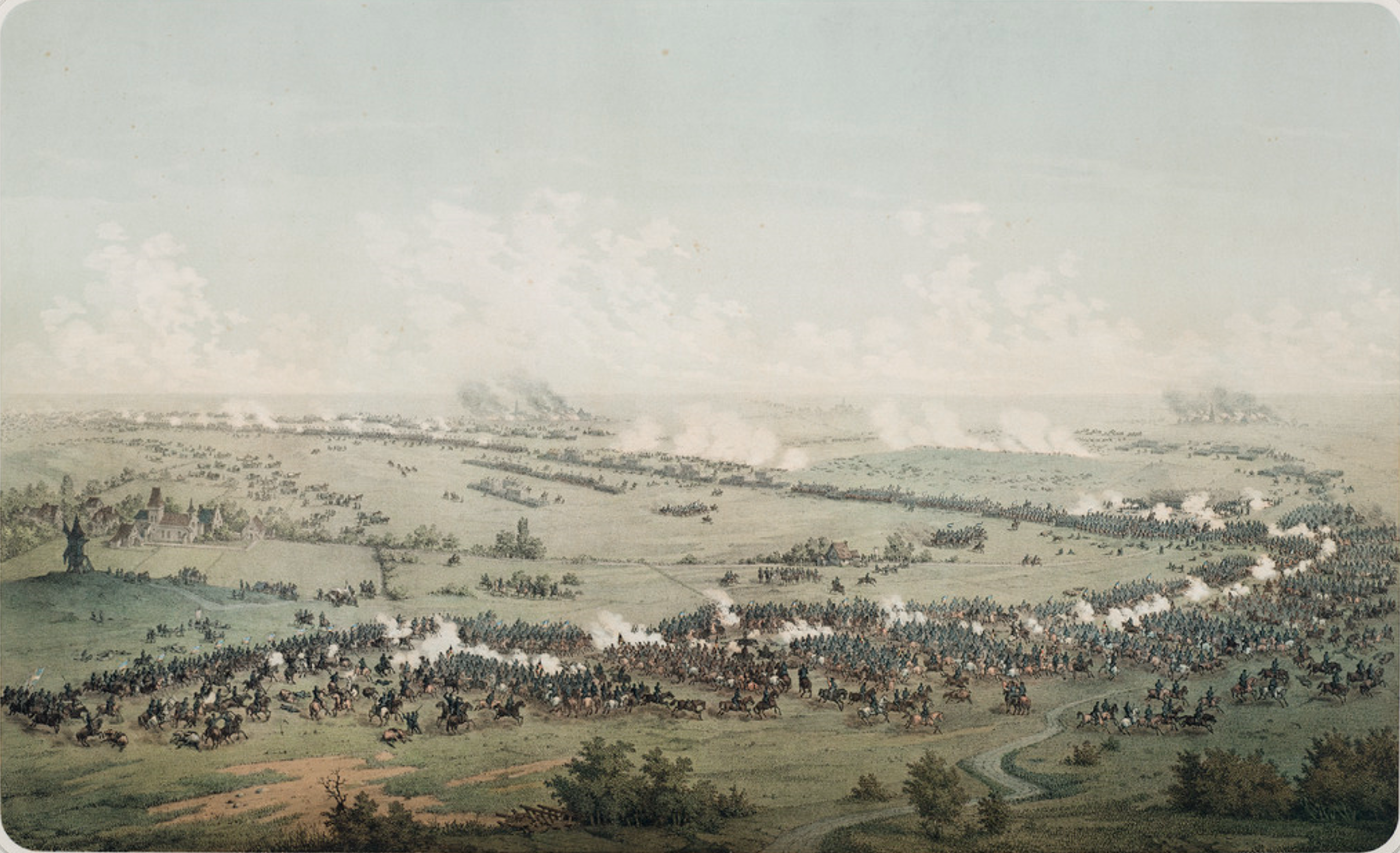
Otto August Mankell's painting of the battle depicting the cavalry attacks against the Swedish right wing.

Without receiving any orders from Tilly, Pappenheim went on his own initiative with his cuirassiers and attacked the Swedish right wing at two o'clock. He executed a flanking maneuver to avoid the fire of the Swedish guns. His harquebusiers and the Schleswig-Holstein-Gottorp regiment advanced behind his cuirassiers. Pappenheim's aim was to employ caracole tactics to penetrate Gustavus Adolphus' front. Banér and the King had by this time fully deployed their troops into lines, and were fully prepared to defend themselves against Pappenheim's assault. As soon as Pappenheim's cuirassiers approached Gustavus Adolphus' front and discharged their pistols at them, the Swedish commanded musketeer platoons fired a concentrated volley at point-blank range. Short after, the Swedish cuirassiers fired their pistols at the approaching Imperial cuirassiers.

The surprisingly accurate Swedish fire disrupted the charge of the Imperial cuirassiers and forced them to withdraw. Pappenheim regrouped his cuirassiers for a renewed attack, with fire support from musketeers of Schleswig-Holstein-Gottorp regiment and Piccolomini's and Merode's harquebusiers. While the Swedish musketeers reloaded their muskets, the Swedish cavalry mounted swift counter-charges against Pappenheim's scattered cuirassiers. The horsemen then fell back to their previous positions to avoid the fire from Pappenheim's harquebusiers and musketeers, allowing the Swedish musketeers to fire a new volley at Pappenheim's cavalry. This process was repeated each time Pappenheim made a new attempt to penetrate Gustavus Adolphus' lines.

"By half three, our cannon a little ceasing, the horsemen on both wings charged furiously one another, our horsemen with a resolution, abiding unloosing a pistol, till the enemy had discharged first, and then at a near distance our musketeers meeting them with a salvo; then our horsemen discharged their pistols, and then charged through them with swords; and at their return the musketeers were ready again to give the second salvo of musket amongst them; the enemy thus valiantly resisted by our horsemen, and cruelly plagued by our platoons of musketeers; you may imagine, how soon he would be discouraged after charging twice in this manner, and repulsed."

— Robert Monro,

Within an hour Pappenheim made three frontal caracole attacks, all of which were repulsed by the cooperation between the Swedish musketeers and horsemen. Despite this setback, his offensive power was still strong and he was able to quickly recoil and regroup his dispersed cuirassiers. As the firepower from the King's front proved extremely taxing, he decided to extend his cavalry line leftward and go around the King's front to envelop his right flank. By performing this evasive maneuver, he directed his attacks against the King's right flank, as well as Banér's troops in the second line. Gustavus Adolphus promptly responded to this threat by ordering his reserves and Banér's units from the second line to reinforce his exposed flank, allowing him to gradually extend his own line rightward. First to deploy on the King's right flank was the Rhinegrave's cuirassiers, later followed by Aderkas' Livonians, Dönhoff's Curonians and Kochtitzky's Slavic and Pomeranian cavalry. Pappenheim made three flanking attacks against the Swedes. The regimental commanders Aderkas and Damitz fell during this action. Both Gustavus Adolphus and Banér encouraged their horsemen and musketeers to remain steadfast. With all his attacks repulsed, Pappenheim fell back with heavy casualties and left his remaining cuirassiers demoralized and exhausted. Meanwhile, the Yellow Brigade launched their own attack and were able to create a gap between Schleswig-Holstein-Gottorp's regiment and Piccolomini's harquebusiers on Pappenheim's right flank.

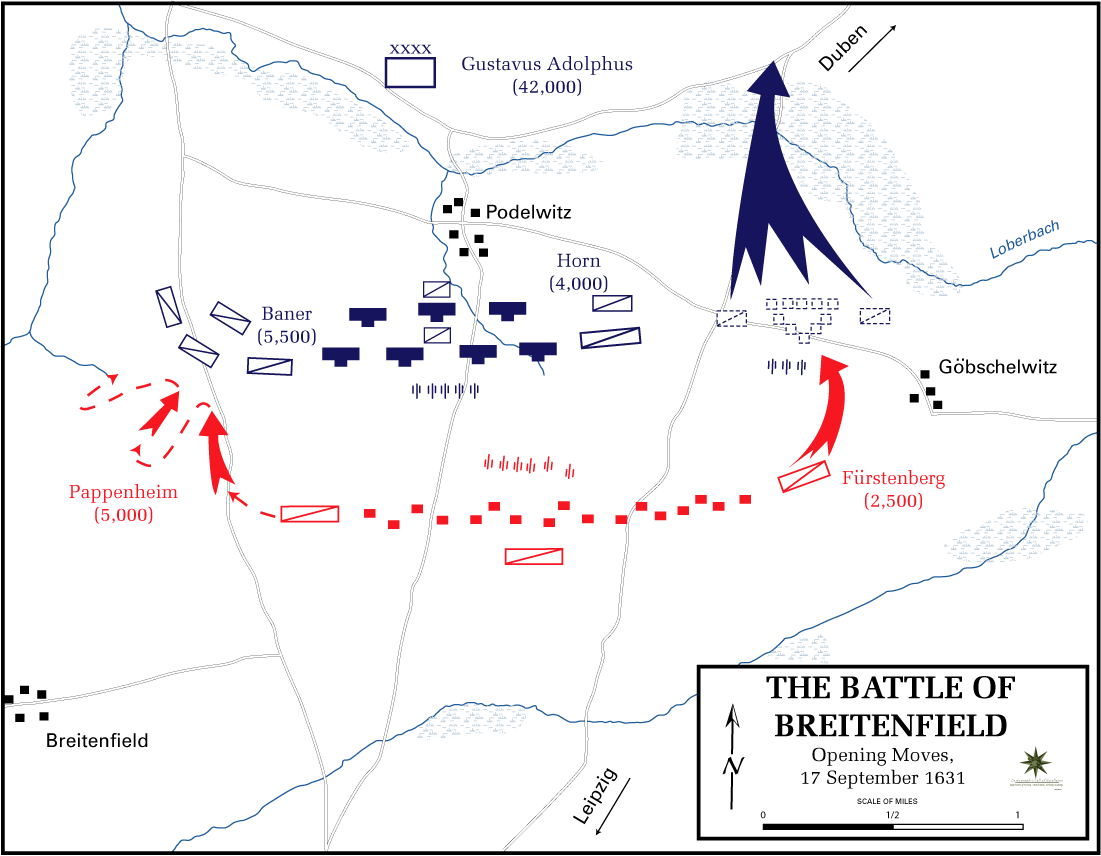
The Imperial cavalry attack the Swedish right wing and the Saxon army. The latter is forced to retreat.

Following Pappenheim's seventh repulse at about four o'clock in the evening, Gustavus Adolphus ordered Banér to rally the cavalry of Sperreuth, Stenbock, Soop, Tott, Stålhandske and Wunsch. Banér led them in a broad counter-charge against both Pappenheim's cuirassiers and Piccolomini's and Merode's harquebusiers. His shock attack immediately threw Pappenheim's exhausted cuirassiers back in disarray, with some units under Pappenheim falling back to the Imperial artillery positions at Galgenberg, while others accompanied Piccolomini in his retreat from the battlefield. The Livonian and Curonian cuirassiers pursued Piccolomini's cuirassiers through Breitenfeld and Halle.

With Pappenheim's cavalry taken out of action, only Colonel von Schleswig-Holstein-Gottorp's infantry regiment remained on this front. The regiment formed into a tercio to stand their ground against attacks from Stålhandske's and Wunsch's Hakkapeliitta. The Finnish horsemen met stubborn resistance, forcing Banér to bring in Ortenburg's cuirassiers and the Yellow Brigade's commanded musketeers at five o'clock, who pulverised the tercio with musketry fire and canister charges from their regimental artillery. Their combined firepower were able to finally bring down the tercio. Out of 1,500 men, only 300 men of the Schleswig-Holstein-Gottorp regiment survived after the battle. Colonel von Schleswig-Holstein-Gottorp was mortally wounded during this action and was escorted as a Swedish prisoner of war to Eilenburg for treatment. He succumbed to his wounds two days later.

=== Tilly's main assault and Saxon retreat ===
Tilly's infantry remained stationary on the Galgenberg while Pappenheim's made his assault against the Swedish right wing. Half an hour after Pappenheim's first charge, Fürstenberg's and Isolani's cavalry, on the Imperial-League right wing, made a direct assault of their own against the Saxon centre and left wing. They were spearheaded by Cronberg's and Schönburg's cuirassier regiments. Schönburg attacked the Saxon Horse Guards, which were quickly routed after a brief struggle. Saxe-Altenburg's and General Bindauf's regiments resolutely defended themselves against Baumgarten's cavalry attack, with the latter soon being reinforced by Cronberg's cavalry. General Bindauf and Colonel Starschedel were both shot to death, resulting in their regiments disintegrating and routing from the battlefield. Colonel Steinau was captured by the Imperial-League troops during the commotion, along with most of his regiment.

At three o'clock in the afternoon, Tilly recognized an opportunity for a main assault with his Imperial-League infantry against both the Saxon army and the left flank of the Swedish centre. Tercios spearheaded by Philipp von Pappenheim's and Göss's regiments, supported by Wangler's regiment and Erwitte's reserve cavalry, marched down the Galgenberg and made an oblique advance to the right, concentrating on the Saxon troops. Meanwhile, Gallas' tercios advanced to put pressure on the Swedish centre, while Tilly's tercios acted as a "hinge" between Gallas' and Göss's tercios. The marching tercios were immediately exposed to Torstenson's artillery fire, which tore huge holes among the tightly packed formations.

Owing to the pressure of Fürstenberg's cavalry, coupled with the advance of Tilly's infantry, the rest of the Saxon army started to panic. The greater part of the army routed from the battlefield at four o'clock. Even the Elector John George, who made desperate attempts to incite his troops to fight back, was dragged along in their flight towards Eilenburg. Some Saxon soldiers took the opportunity to plunder their own tross, as well as the nearby Swedish one, who during the rush was also dragged along in the flight. The Saxon artillery was captured by the Imperial cavalry, who used the pieces to bombard both the fleeing Saxon troops and the Swedish left wing. Parts of Fürstenberg's and Isolani's cavalry, whose men cried out "Victoria" in triumph, chased after the Saxons and plundered their abandoned tross. Almost the entire Saxon army fled the battlefield over the course of merely an hour. Only Colonel Taube's Life Regiment and Arnim's Life Guards remained, who later regrouped behind the Swedish left wing. In a short time, the united Protestant army lost a third of its strength, with the remnants now being numerically inferior to Tilly's army.

=== Regroupment ===
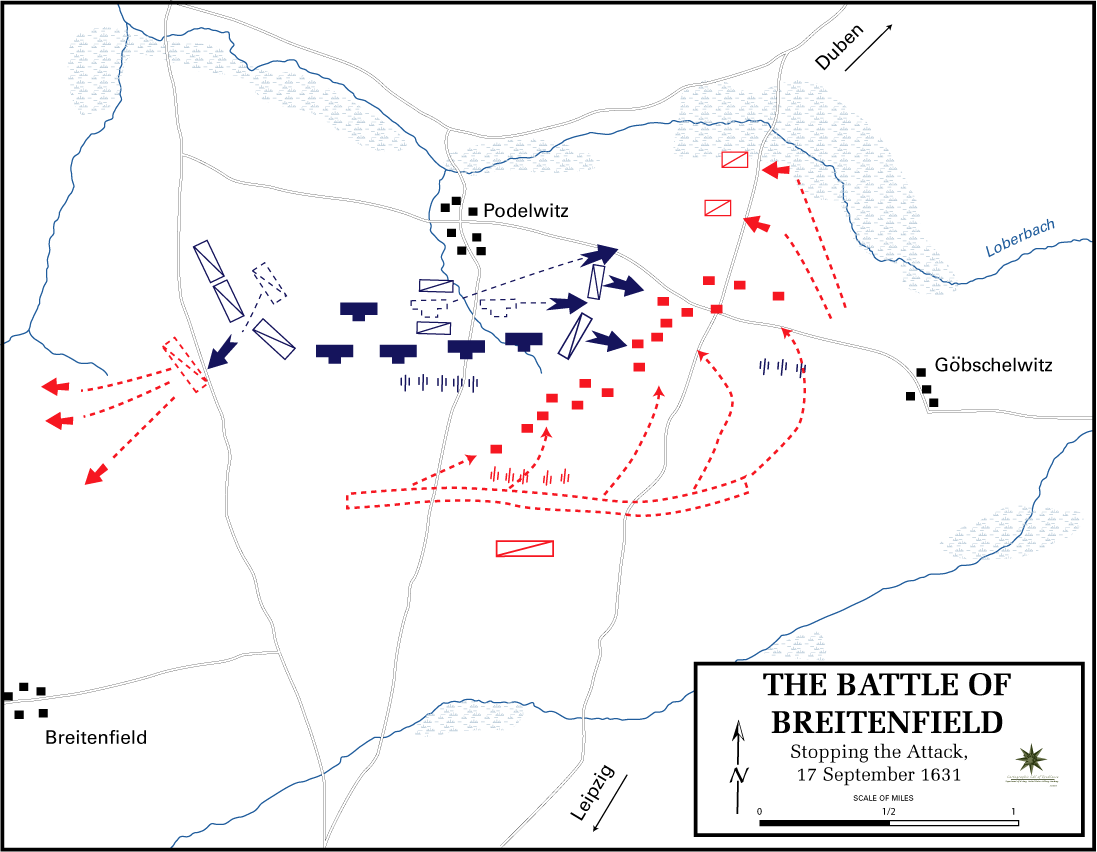
The Imperial-League army pivots to the right for their pincer movement. The Swedish army extends its left wing with auxiliaries to meet the threat.

Tilly's plan was that his centre would launch a broad frontal assault on Horn's open left flank, with fire support from the Imperial batteries on Galgenberg and the captured Saxon artillery. Both Fürstenberg and Isolani were to support Tilly's infantry assault. They gave strict orders to their cavalry to break off their pursuit of the Saxon troops and to attack the open flank and rear of the Swedish centre. While his both cavalry wings made their assaults, Tilly planned to execute a pincer movement against Horn's troops. If successful, he would outflank the Swedish army on their left flank and ultimately drive them back towards the marchlands at the Lober stream. Arriving at the former position of the Saxons, Tilly slowly pivoted his Imperial-League tercios to the left. The movement of such large amount of troops on the trodden earth stirred up huge clouds of dust. These clouds were spread out with the wind towards the Swedish left wing, thus obscuring the visibility among Tilly's and Horn's troops. The left-turn movement and the difficult visibility resulted in Pappenheim's, Wahl's, Wangler's and Reinach-Comargo's infantry regiments, comprising 7,800 men and about 1,000 soldiers from nearby regiments, being pushed too far to the right. Owing to the size of the tercios, the turning manoeuver became a very time-consuming process. Many soldiers were crowded together and placed too far back to fully participate in the fighting on the far left.

The agile Swedish troops now saw their opportunity. Horn observed the new situation occurring before his eyes and immediately reacted to Tilly's attempt to outflank his troops. He took the initiative by ordering his left flank (Baudissin's and Caldenbach's cuirassiers) to pivot sharply to the left, allowing his rear line (Taupadel's dragoons and Efferen-Hall's and Courville's cuirassiers) to advance and extend his front line on both flanks. Waldstein's commanded musketeers were also lined up in the gaps between the squadrons.

Horn thus re-aligned his troops in a new defensive front at a 90-degree angle, which ran perpendicularly along the country road between Düben and Leipzig. The road was surrounded by deep ditches, which Horn used as a defensive obstacle. His hastily improvised maneuver was carried out in just 15 minutes, and he exploited the surrounding smoke and dust clouds to conceal his deployment. Before the maneuver could be completed, Fürstenberg made an attempt to charge Horn's flank. But since his cavalry, having chased away the Saxon troops, had not yet regrouped his ranks effectively, he was unable to mount a concentrated attack. Thus his attack was quickly repulsed by a concentrated volley from Waldstein's musketeers.

=== Action at Horn's front ===
Horn was well aware that his thin lines alone could not hold their ground against the crushing force of the Imperial-League infantry, which now numbered some 20,000 men and reinforced by thousands of Fürstenberg's cavalry. While Tilly slowly regrouped his tercios for his decisive infantry assault, he wanted to put pressure on Horn by sending Fürstenberg's remaining cavalry, mainly Baumgarten's and Cronberg's cuirassier regiments, in several columns to attack the Swedish left wing from the flank and the rear. Horn responded to Tilly's regroupment by having Baudissin's and Caldenbach's cuirassiers engage in delaying actions against the Imperial-League infantry, with fire support from Waldstein's musketeers. His aim was to disrupt Tilly's attack preparations in order to buy himself time to call for reinforcements. In some places, Horn's rapid-firing regimental artillery was able to unleash a blast of close-range grapeshots and canister-charges against the slow-moving Imperial-League infantry. At the same time, Efferen-Hall's and Courville's cuirassiers managed to repulse Fürstenberg's cavalry charge. Fürstenberg responded by using the captured Saxon artillery to bombard the Swedish cuirassiers, killing colonel Efferen-Hall and several of his men in the process. Tilly ordered Fürstenberg to renew his attacks on Horn's front, while his infantry moved into fighting positions. When these began to march across the deep trenches, Colonel Caldenbach and his regiment decided to sally out against the Imperial-League infantry in a suicidal assault. Caldenbach and nearly all of his men were killed during this delaying action, however, their assault stalled the advance of several enemy infantry regiments. This gave Horn more time to organize his defense.

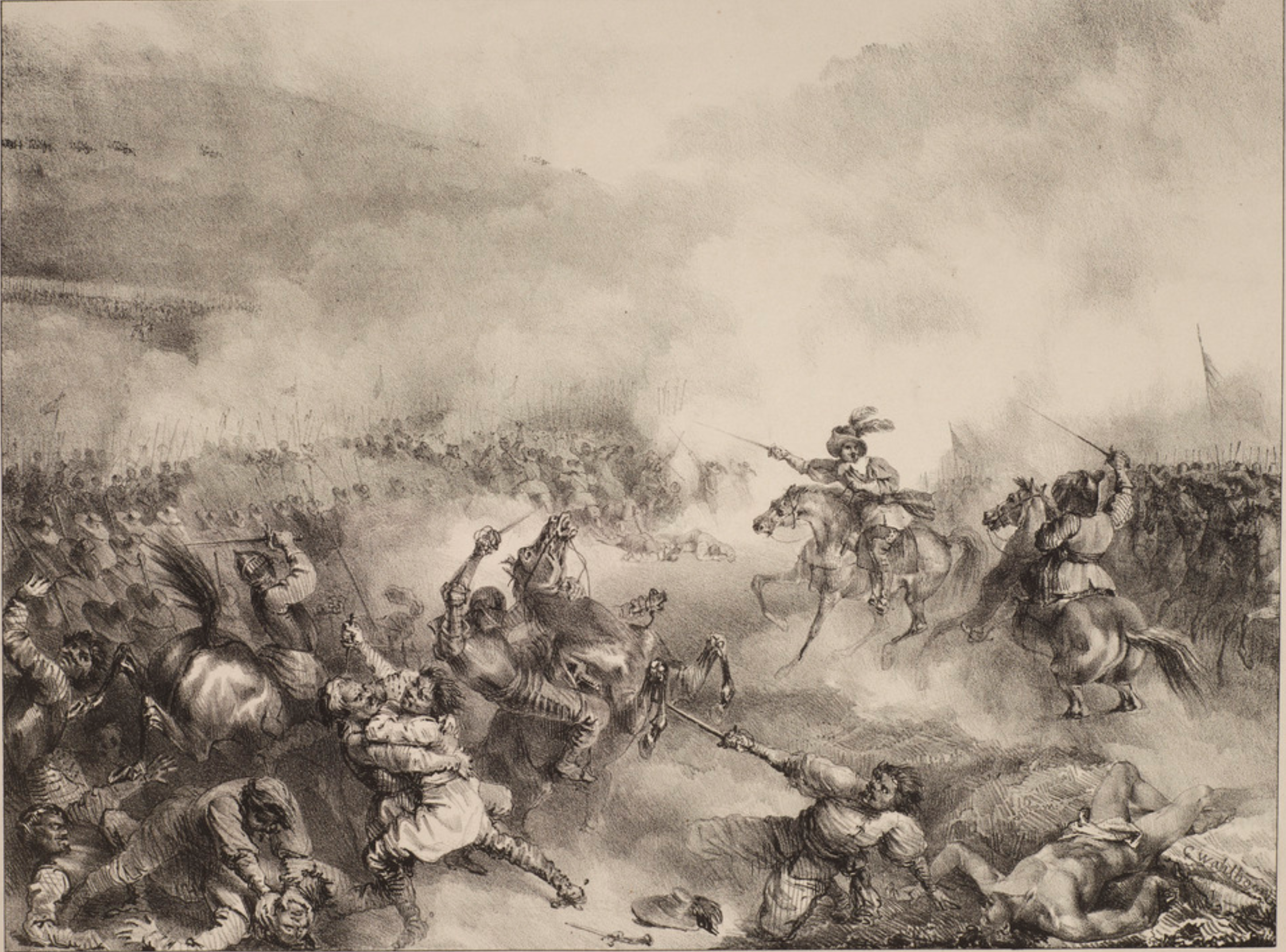
Battle of Breitenfeld by Carl Wahlbom.

Horn reported his situation to Major General Teuffel, who in turn forwarded the report to Gustavus Adolphus while he was busy with his own defense against Pappenheim's assaults. The King hastened to the centre where he received a direct report from Field Marshal Arnim that the Saxon army had retreated and the entire Imperial-League army had turned their attention towards Horn's isolated troops. The King immediately ordered Teuffel to send auxiliaries to Horn's aid. As Teuffel was about to carry out the King's order, he was killed by a stray bullet fired from Tilly's infantry regiment, who advanced to confront the stationary Blue Brigade. This forced Gustavus Adolphus to ride alone to Colonel Hepburn at the centre's second line. He ordered him to march to Horn's aid with all three brigades of the second line, along with the reserve units from the first and second lines. In columns, Hepburn's, Eckstädt's, and Thurn's brigades and the reserve troops pivoted straight to the left and deployed themselves on Horn's left front, bringing with them their 18 regimental guns. Furthermore, Efferen-Hall's and Courville's cuirassier regiments were reinforced with Schaffman's and Kochtitzky's cavalry companies. With their arrival at his position, Horn was able to dispose of around 10,000 soldiers, whereby his front line could no longer be outflanked by Tilly's onslaught.

As the Swedish auxiliaries arrived at Horn's front, Philipp von Pappenheim's tercios advanced in columns to confront the Green Brigade. Although Pappenheim's veteran regiments were three times the size of the Green Brigade, the latter had brought several regimental guns and had both the sun and the wind behind their backs. Isolani's Croats employed the caracole to stall the Green Brigade, but they were repulsed by heavy musket volleys and canister shots from Hepburn's regimental guns. When Pappenheim's tercios was within range, Hepburn lined up his Scottish musketeers with their three front ranks kneeling and three rear ranks standing upright. In a short time they were able to fire concentrated platoon volleys, which together with the canister shots from their regimental guns inflicted mounting casualties on Pappenheim's advancing columns. These in turn returned fire with their own muskets.

First (saith he), giving fire unto three little Field-pieces that I had before me, I suffered not my muskettiers to give their volleyes till I came within Pistollshot of the enemy, at which time I gave order to the first rancks to discharge at once, and after them the other three: which done we fell pell mell into their ranckes, knocking them downe with the stocke of the Musket and our swords.

— Henry Muschamp, Lt. Colonel from Scotland,

...[Tilly] received a horrible, uninterrupted pounding from the king's light pieces and was prevented from coming to grips with the latter's forces.

— Raimondo Montecuccoli, Imperial officer,

At the same time, Göss' tercios clashed with Eckstädt's brigade and Erwitte's reserve cavalry advanced against Horn's cavalry. Horn's cavalry acted as a "hinge" between Eckstädt's brigade and the Blue Brigade in the centre. As Göss's and Pappenheim's tercios approached their opponents, the pikemen of both sides clashed against each other, both supported by Baudissin's and Cronberg's cavalry who swept across the open terrain. The musketeers also took part in the fierce melee, using the butt end of their muskets as clubs. Erwitte's arquebusier regiments also attacked Horn's cavalry with the use of caracole and artillery support. Horn responded to Erwitte's attack with infantry musketry and cavalry countercharges.

The fierce fighting along Horn's front accumulated thick clouds of gunpowder smoke and dust, which with strong westerly winds spread across the entire battlefield. These greatly obscured both the commander's ability to survey the battle and the soldiers' ability to recognize their own comrades. At five o'clock in the afternoon, the action at Horn's front had been going on for an hour. Hepburn signaled his musicians to play Scottish marching music to prevent his Scottish troops from getting lost in the smoke. The repeated and concentrated volleys from Horn's and Hepburn's musketeers, coupled with the heavy cannonade from their regimental artillery, forced the remnants of the Imperial-League infantry to stall their attacks, leading to the men being crowded together and losing their momentum. Despite the heavy resistance, Tilly refused to withdraw and his infantry continued to put up heavy pressure on Horn's troops. But his positions had very limited room to manoeuvre and were slowly being pushed back by strong counterattacks made by Horn's and Hepburn's troops.

=== Annihilation of the Imperial-League force ===
Battle of Breitenfeld (1631) by Matthäus Merian the Elder after a drawing by Olof Örnehufvud.

At five o'clock in the afternoon, the battle had been going on for five hours. Following Banér's successful cavalry charge against Pappenheim's cavalry, Gustavus Adolphus noticed a gap had opened up between the Imperial-League centre and the fleeing left wing. He now recognized an opportunity to launch a major counteroffensive to break through Tilly's army. After he had sent auxiliaries to Horn's front, the King rode over to Banér on the right wing to rally his remaining cavalry. He ordered Soop and his Västergötland cavalry to charge against Erwitte's open left flank. Along with Horn's cavalry, Soop's regiment were able to drive Erwitte's cavalry back into Tilly's infantry, causing disorder among the tightly packed tercios.

Meanwhile, the King rode at the head of the Hakkapeliitta and Stenbock's, Sperreuth's and Rheingrave's cavalry. He led them into a flanking charge against the Imperial artillery. Small remnants of Pappenheim's cuirassiers, who had retreated to the Galgenberg, were chased off by the King's cavalry. The Swedes rode up the slopes, cut down the imperial artillerymen and seized their guns. They then rode down the slopes to join up with Soop's cavalry and roll up the remnants of the Imperial-League centre from its left flank.

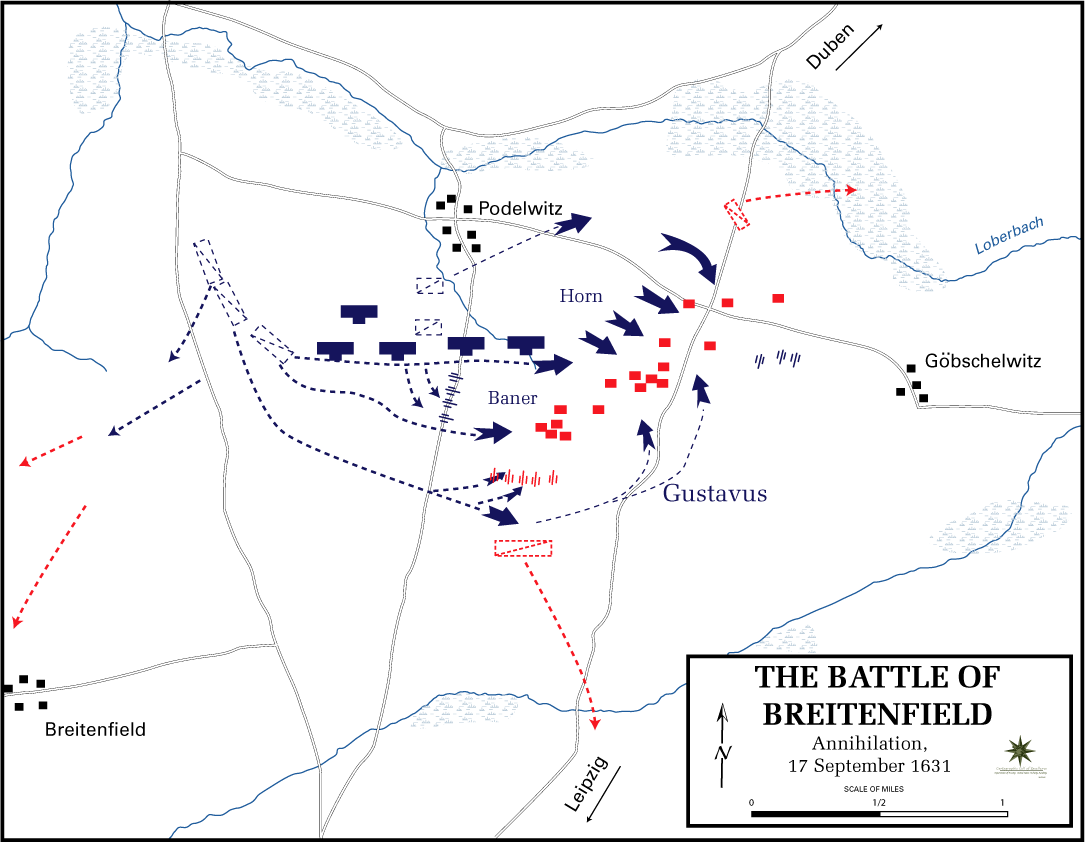
The Imperial cavalry retreats and the Imperial-League infantry are attacked from multiple directions.

To complete his counter-offensive, Gustavus Adolphus ordered the rest of his right wing and the brigades on the first line of the centre to pivot perpendicularly to the left. This manoeuvre allowed the brigades to occupy the Galgenberg, push back Tilly's Imperial-League infantry, and cut off their line of retreat towards Leipzig. At the same time, Torstenson moved his light artillery forward and Mackay's and Monro's regiments were able to recapture the Saxon artillery. Together with the captured Imperial artillery, the tightly packed Imperial-League infantry were now exposed to a heavy artillery crossfire.

Between six and seven o'clock, Horn made his last cavalry charge against the enemy. Hepburn's brigade led an infantry attack, and the King sent the Blue Brigade to support him. These two-fold attacks, coupled with the destructive crossfire from the Swedish artillery, finally led to the collapse of Tilly's army. The Imperial-League tercios suffered heavy losses and lost all cohesion. The remnants of Tilly's army was thus forced into a disorderly retreat. The regimental commanders Erwitte, Caffarelli and Philipp Pappenheim where killed during this action, while Coronini became a Swedish prisoner of war. Thus both Erwitte's reserve cavalry and Philipp Pappenheim's regiment fell apart and fled in panic from the battlefield.

At this point, Tilly had been wounded in the chest and neck by three musket bullets, and received two blows to the head by a German officer, belonging to the Rheingrave's regiment, who attempted to capture him. Tilly was saved when the German officer was shot down by Imperial Colonel Rudolf Maximilian von Sachsen-Lauenburg. Cronberg's and Schönburg's cuirassiers escorted Tilly to safety in Halle. Meanwhile, Field Marshal Pappenheim managed to return to the fray and tried to gather every remaining cuirassier he could find. But by this time, most of the Imperial cavalry had fled the battlefield. With limited room for maneuver, Pappenheim undertook the task of protecting Tilly's retreat. Scattered Imperial-League troops fled towards Leipzig, Merseburg and Halle. Both the King's and Horn's cavalry launched a determined pursuit, cutting down or capturing any Imperial-League soldiers who failed to escape the battlefield. Large parts of the Swedish army, however, were too exhausted to partake in the pursuit. Tilly's army was thus spared from total annihilation.

At six o'clock in the evening, Pappenheim formed tercios at the brow of the Linkelwald forest with the last cohesive remnants of Baldiron-Dietrichstein's, Göss's, Chiesa's and Blankart's regiments. The tercios put up dogged resistance against Tott's and Stenbock's attacking cavalry. Their resistance also gave respite to the remaining Imperial-League troops scattered around the battlefield to escape with their lives. The tercios were subjected to artillery fire from their own artillery pieces, which had now been turned against them by Gustavus Adolphus and Horn's cavalry. By sundown, the 4,100 men of the four Imperial regiments from the start of the battle had now been reduced to a mere 600 men. The fighting finally subsided during nightfall at nine o'clock in the evening. Under the cover of darkness, Pappenheim was able to retreat from the battlefield along with the last Imperial-League soldiers. The flight proceeded in good order through the Linkelwald and in the direction of Halle. The exhausted Swedish infantry spent the night on the battlefield, while the Swedish cavalry and Taube's Saxon cuirassiers continued their pursuit along the roads towards Leipzig and Halle.

"The battaile thus happily wonne, his Majesty did principally under God ascribe the glory of the (first) victory to the Swedes and Fynnes horsemen, who were led by the valorous Fieldt-Marshall Gustavus Horne; for though the Dutch horsemen did behave themselves valourously divers times that day, yet it was not their fortune to put the enemy to flight; and though there were brave brigades of Swedes and Dutch in the field, yet it was the Scots brigads’ fortune to have gotten the praise for the foote service, and not without cause, having behaved themselves well, being led and conducted by an expert cavalier and fortunat—the valiant Hepburne."

— Robert Monro,

== Casualties ==
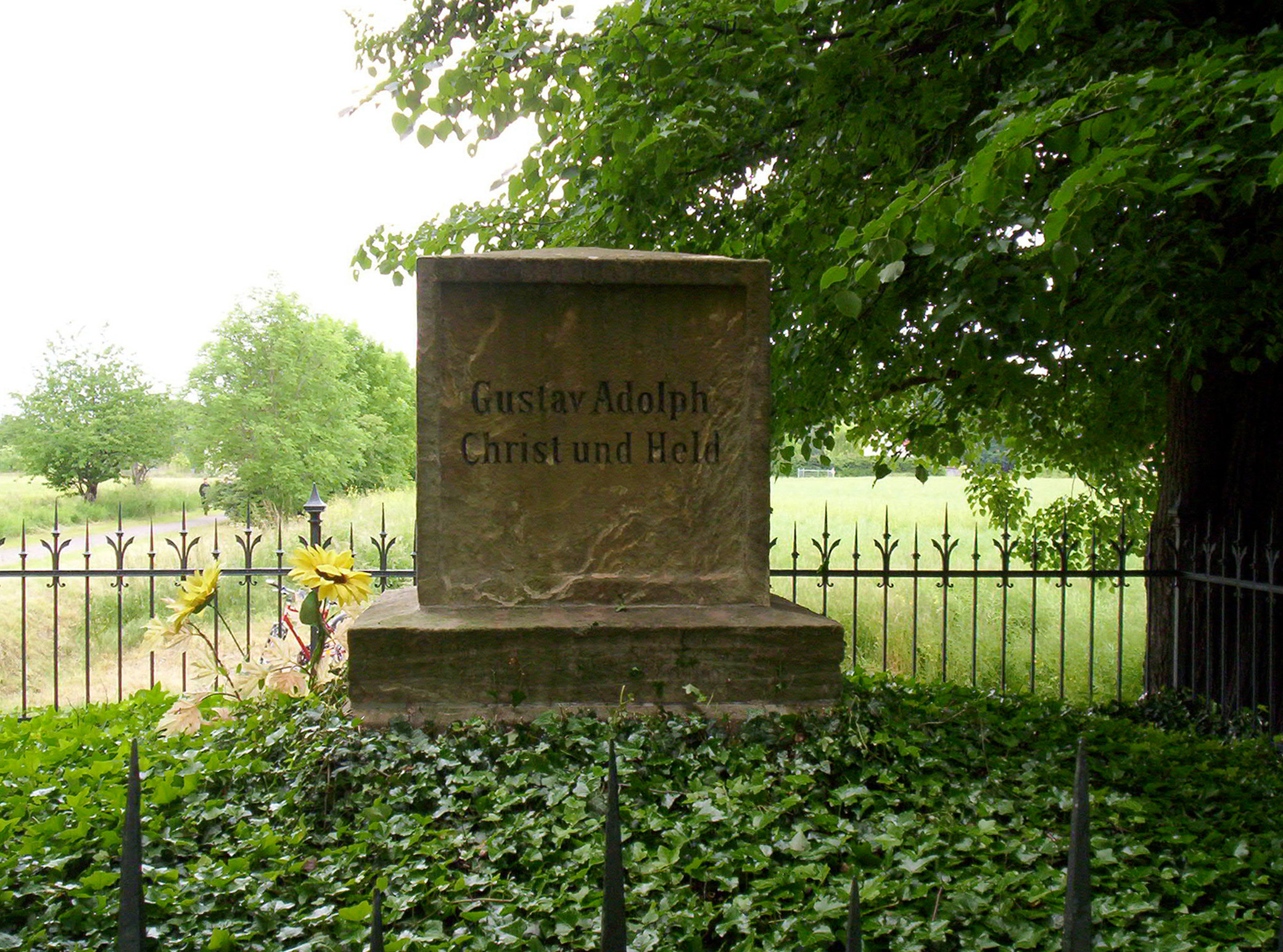
Commemorative monument at Breitenfeld erected during the bicentenary of the battle. The inscription in German reads: Freedom of belief for the world, saved at Breitenfeld, Gustavus Adolphus, Christian and hero.

=== Imperial-Catholic League Army ===
The Imperial-League losses were devastating, with between 7,000 and 8,000 men killed, or around 7,600 men according to some sources, and around 6,000 men captured. Tilly had lost two-thirds of his army in the course of just a few days.

In the following day after the battle, 3,000 fleeing Imperial soldiers surrendered to their Saxon pursuers, who hunted them all the way to Leipzig. The Imperial-League prisoners of war from the battle were soon recruited into the Swedish ranks, as replacements for the Swedes' own losses. Up to 5,000 fleeing Imperial-League soldiers either deserted or were killed by vengeful Saxon peasants in the days following the battle. Among the dead were General of the Artillery Schönburg, General Erwitte and colonels Baumgarten, Schleswig-Holstein-Gottorp, Caffarelli, and Philipp Pappenheim. Furthermore, colonels Blankart, Coronini, Montecuccoli, and Wangler were captured along with a number of lieutenant colonels, rittmeisters and captains. Field Marshals Tilly and Pappenheim and General Fürstenberg were wounded during the battle.

Tilly also lost his entire artillery park, his war chest, and 120 banners and standards. The latter were transported as spoils of war to the Riddarholmen Church in Stockholm for public viewing.

=== Swedish-Saxon army ===
Swedish losses amounted to 3,550 men, divided between 2,100 infantry and 1,450 cavalry. Among the dead were Major General Teuffel, colonels Efferen-Hall, Caldenbach and Damitz and Lieutenant Colonel Aderkas. Colonel Courville became an Imperial prisoner of war.

The Saxons lost between 2,000 and 3,000 men. Most were killed during the artillery barrage at the start of the battle or while they were fleeing from the Imperial cavalry. Among the dead were General Bindauf and Colonel Starschedel.

== Aftermath ==
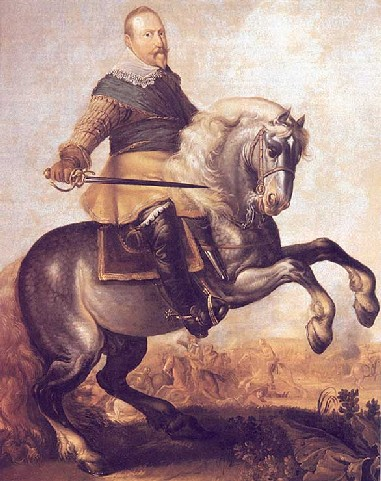
Gustav II Adolf at the Battle of Breitenfeld by an unknown artist.

The Catholics had suffered their first major defeat in the war, which had now been going on for 13 years. Mercenary Peter Hagendorf commented on the defeat:

"What we had stuffed into us at Altmark, we were forced to regurgitate heavily again outside Leipzig."

— Peter Hagendorf.,

Shortly after the battle, the remnants of Tilly's Imperial-League army were forced to retreat south, divided into two parts. Tilly led his troops towards Nördlingen in the Upper Palatinate, while Pappenheim marched with his troops towards the Weser to ambush Gustavus Adolphus's reserve forces.

The Swedish victory at Breitenfeld sent shockwaves around Europe, since the German Protestant states won their first and greatest victory since the outbreak of the war. Breitenfeld came to symbolize the Lutherans' revenge for the Magdeburg massacre months before. The victory allowed Gustavus Adolphus to choose direction of his march. On 15 September a council of war was held in Halle to decide on the continued war plans. One option was to go directly towards Vienna and try to bring about a quick end to the war. The parties decided that John Georg I's Saxon troops would march towards the Austrian Hereditary Lands and Vienna, while the Swedes moved south-west towards the Rhine River to engage the remaining Imperial troops. This decision has been discussed and questioned ever since, but it is impossible to know whether a march towards Vienna could have brought about favorable peace terms for the Protestants already in 1632.

Shortly after the council of war in Halle, Gustavus Adolphus's army first marched to the southwest, encountering only sporadic resistance from scattered imperial troops. On 22 September 1631, he captured the city of Erfurt, followed by Würzburg on 5 October, although the nearby Marienberg Fortress continued to resist. After a determined assault, Marienberg was captured by the Swedes on 8 October. On 19 November, Gustavus Adolphus broke camp with 13,000 men, leaving 7,000 men as an occupying force in Würzburg. The king marched down the river Main and captured several towns and fortresses along the way, the garrisons of which went over to the Swedish army in large numbers. Already on 17 November the city of Frankfurt am Main was taken without a fight. The King's army then continued down the Main, reached its outlet in the Rhine, crossed the great river, and captured the Electoral residence of Mainz on 11 December 1631, where they established their winter quarters.

The totality of the victory confirmed Gustavus Adolphus's military innovations and guaranteed that the Swedes would remain engaged in the war for the foreseeable future. In the long term, the significant loss of forces and the creation of a strong Protestant anti-Imperial force required the Emperor and the Protestant and Catholic princes to rethink on the operational conduct of the war, and the diplomatic avenues they would pursue with it. Gustavus Adolphus's success encouraged several other princes to join the cause of the Swedish king and his few allies. By the month's end, Hanover, the Hessian dukes, Brandenburg and Saxony were officially aligned against the empire, and France had agreed to provide substantially greater funding for Gustavus Adolphus' armies. Although Gustavus Adolphus was killed a year later at the battle of Lützen, the military strength of the alliance had been secured through the addition of new armies. Even when Swedish leadership faltered it did not fail, and the influx of French gold ensured that the hostilities could continue.

== Analysis ==
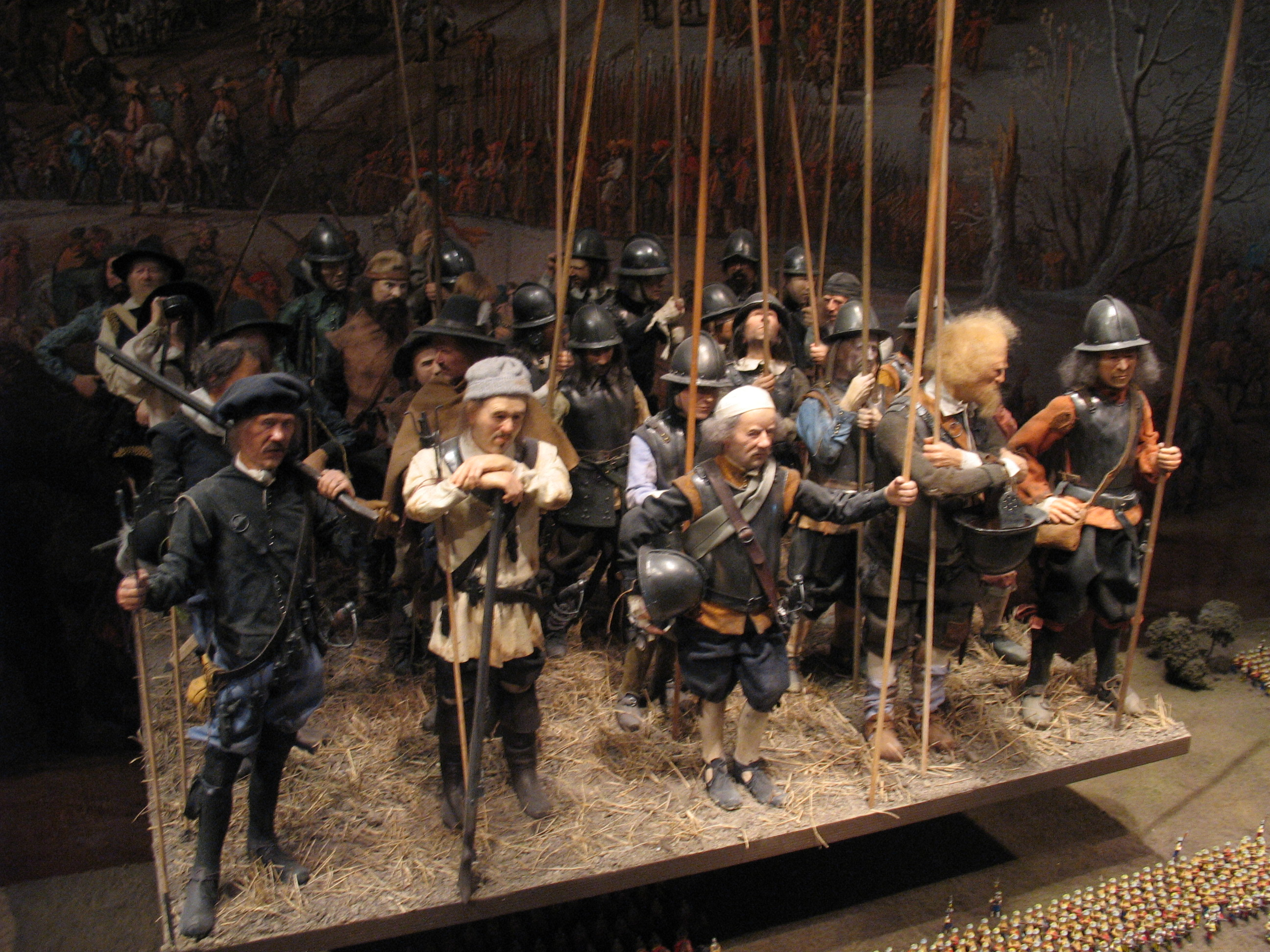
A model of a section of a pike and shot formation from the Thirty Years' War on display at the Swedish Army Museum in Stockholm. Consistent (uniform) dress was not common for military troops at the time.

Europe's armies at the beginning of the 17th century primarily used two kinds of military doctrines: the Spanish-German doctrine and the Dutch doctrine. The Spanish-German doctrine, adopted by Johann Tserclaes Tilly at Breitenfeld, was characterized by robust pike and shot tactical formations. These consisted mainly of pikemen and some musketeers and were formed into large squares known as "tercios". Tercios were heavy on the offensive, but difficult to maneuver on the battlefield. The Dutch battleline was more distinctly linear than the Spanish-German equivalent and was characterized by battalions. These were significantly smaller combat units with both pikemen and musketeers, making them easier to maneuver than the tercios. But since these lacked the crushing weight of the tercios in a frontal assault, firepower played a greater role among the Dutch battalions. Cavalry and artillery were of comparatively minor importance in both systems of combat methodology.

Gustavus Adolphus's Swedish combat methodology was a further development of the Dutch combat methodology and was based on his experiences during the Polish–Swedish War. The smallest combat unit of the King's infantry was the battalion (then called the squadron). Before battle, three to four battalions were combined into a larger combat unit, the brigade. The brigade was powerful enough to both defend against or successfully attack a tercio. Unlike the tercio, the brigade, thanks to its composition of battalions, could maneuver itself much faster and more smoothly on the battlefield. The battleline within Gustavus Adolphus's army was usually divided into two lines, with the brigades formed into line formation side by side in the centre and the cavalry in line formation on both wings. Within each battalion, the pikemen stood in the centre and the musketeers on the wings. A number of musketeer divisions were grouped together with the cavalry.

The firepower was of vital importance in the army of Gustavus Adolphus. Proportionally, the Swedish musketeers in his battalion were fewer than those in the tercio or the Dutch battalion, but they were used highly effectively. Gustavus Adolphus instructed his musketeers to fire volleys instead of successive fire. He had also developed a new technique of musket fire; the musketeers took up firing positions in three ranks: with the first rank while kneeling, the second rank while crouching and the third rank in a standing position. A concentrated Swedish volley had a devastating effect and opened the way for a fierce attack from the Swedish pikemen. The ratio of muskets to pikes was 13 to 8. Thus compared to the Dutch formation, Gustavus Adolphus had increased the number of pikes. The Swedish battleline was also more flexible, as the battalions were only six ranks deep. This made it possible for the Swedish units to quickly react to the enemy's movements. More important, the linear formation allowed most Swedish musketeers to fire at the same time, and allowed the Swedish infantry to match the Imperialist frontage with a smaller number of men.

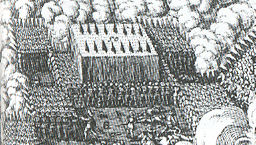
A bastioned tercio in battle.

In addition to the musketeers' volley fire and agility during battle, Gustavus Adolphus also used regimental guns that accompanied the troops during their advance and provided devastating firepower at close range. He had moved away from heavy siege artillery into more mobile field pieces, which because of their mobility and rate of fire were much more effective than the former per pound. In addition, the Swedish cavalry before their clash with the enemy cavalry received effective fire support from the nearby musketeer divisions. The cavalry had also learned, after firing their pistols, to charge with their sabres at hand at full gallop. The great firepower of Gustavus Adolphus's musketeers and artillery, combined with the flexibility of its order of battle (the brigades), made the Swedish army very effective in defensive battles. But the core of his battle methodology, which greatly contributed to the victory at Breitenfeld, was the combined arms of both musketeers and regimental artillery, whose systematic firepower enabled a victorious breakthrough in close combat. This methodology would later be adopted among other armies in Europe and was an important contribution to the development of early modern warfare.

The casualties suffered by the Imperial-League army at Breitenfeld spoke for a change of the Spanish-German doctrine. When Wallenstein regained his role as commander-in-chief of the army, he engaged Gustavus Adolphus's army at the battle of Lützen in 1632, where he deployed his imperial infantry into battalions of three lines. His battalions were influenced by the Dutch doctrine and he also used Gustavus Adolphus's model of uniting battalions into brigades. The Swedish brigade was also forced to reform as a result of the Swedish defeat at the battle of Nördlingen in 1634.

== See also ==
- Breitenfeld (1631) order of battle
- Hakkapeliitta
- Björneborgarnas marsch

== Bibliography ==
- Artéus, Gunnar (2005), Svensk fältherrekonst [Swedish art of war] (in Swedish), Vällingby: Swedish Defence University, ISBN 9185401064
- Barker, Thomas (1975), The Military Intellectual and Battle, Albany, NY: State University of New York Press, ISBN 978-0-87395-251-4
- Carlsson, Sten; Rosén, Jerker (1967), Den svenska historien [The Swedish history] (in Swedish), vol. 4, Stockholm: Albert Bonniers förlag AB
- Cristini, Luca Stefano (2017), La battaglia di Breitenfeld (1631): il superbo capolavoro tattico di Gustavo Adolfo [The Battle of Breitenfeld (1631): Gustavus Adolphus' superb tactical masterpiece] (in Italian), Soldiershop Publishing, ISBN 9788893272148
- Curths, Carl (1814), Die Schlacht bei Breitenfeld unweit Leipzig am 7. September 1631 und die Schlacht bei Lützen am 7. November 1632 [The Battle of Breitenfeld near Leipzig on September 7, 1631 and the Battle of Lützen on November 7, 1632] (in German), Leipzig and Altenburg: Brockhaus
- Davis, Paul (2013), Masters of the Battlefield: Great Commanders from the Classical Age to the Napoleonic Era, New York: Oxford University Press, ISBN 978-0-19-534235-2
- Dodge, Theodore Ayrault (1895), Gustavus Adolphus: A history of the art of war from its revival after the Middle Ages to the end of the Spanish Succession War, with a detailed account of the campaigns of the great Swede, and of the most famous campaigns of Turenne, Condé, Eugene and Marlborough, Houghton, Mifflin, ISBN 978-1853672347, OCLC 33899011
- Englund, Peter (1993), Ofredsår: om den svenska stormaktstiden och en man i dess mitt [Years of unrest: about the Swedish Era of Great Power and a man in its midst] (in Swedish), Stockholm: Bokförlaget Atlantis, ISBN 91-7486-067-4
- Glete, Jan (9 September 2005a), Den svenska armén i Tyskland 1630–1632: Storlek, sammansättning, geografiskt ursprung och förbandens ålder [The Swedish army in Germany 1630–1632: Size, composition, geographical origin and age among the units] (PDF), Department of History at Stockholm University, archived from the original (PDF) on 21 February 2007
- Glete, Jan (30 September 2005b), Värvade regementen i svensk tjänst 1618-1631 [Enlisted regiments in Swedish service 1618-1631] (PDF), Department of History at Stockholm University, archived from the original (PDF) on 9 July 2021
- Grant, James (1851), Memoirs and Adventures of Sir John Hepburn, Edinburgh: William Blackwood & Sons
- Grant, James; Thomée, Gustaf (1853), Konung Gustaf Adolfs skottska krigare: efter 'The memoirs of sir John Hepburn: ett bidrag till trettioåriga krigets historia [King Gustavus Adolphus' Scottish Warriors: After 'The Memoirs of Sir John Hepburn': A Contribution to the History of the Thirty Years' War], Stockholm: Albert Bonniers Förlag
- Gullberg, Tom (2008), Lejonet vaknar 1611–1660 [The lion wakes up 1611–1660] (in Swedish), Helsingfors: Schildts Förlags AB, ISBN 978-951-50-1822-9
- Jones, Archer (2001), The Art of War in the Western World, Urbana: University of Illinois Press, ISBN 0-252-06966-8
- Jörgensen, Christer; Månsson, Per Lennart (2005), Slagfältet under stormaktstiden [The battlefield during the Swedish Era of Great Power] (in Swedish), Lund: Historiska media, ISBN 91-85377-44-9
- Lunde, Henrik O. (2014), A Warrior Dynasty: The Rise and Decline of Sweden as a Military Superpower, Stockholm: Norstedt, ISBN 978-1514632680
- Mackay, Donald (1637), Monro, His Expedition with the Worthy Scots Regiment Called Mac-Keys, London: William Jones
- Mankell, Julius (1854), Arkiv till upplysning om svenska krigens och krigsinrättningarnes historia: Första Bandet [Archive for information regarding the history of the Swedish war and military institutions] (in Swedish), vol. 1, Stockholm: Norstedt
- Mankell, Julius (1860), Arkiv till upplysning om svenska krigens och krigsinrättningarnes historia: Andra Bandet [Archive for information on the history regarding the Swedish war and military institutions] (in Swedish), vol. 2, Stockholm: Norstedt
- Monro, Robert (1634), Monro his expedition vvith the vvorthy Scots Regiment (called Mac-Keyes Regiment) levied in August 1626. by Sr. Donald Mac-Key Lord Rhees, colonell for his Majesties service of Denmark, and reduced after the Battaile of Nerling, to one company in September 1634 at Wormes in the Paltz (PDF), London: William Jones
- Müller, Marco von (2005), Das Leben eines Söldners im Dreißigjährigen Krieg (1618–1648) [The Life of a Mercenary in the Thirty Years' War (1618–1648)] (in German), Berlin: Freie Universität Berlin
- Nelsson, Bertil; Lannerbäck, Alf; Nordin, Mats; Sjögren, Lasse (1993), Från Brunkeberg till Nordanvind: 500 år med svenskt infanteri [From Brunkeberg to Nordanvind: 500 years of Swedish infantry] (in Swedish), Stockholm: Probus, ISBN 91-87184-23-0
- Norrhem, Svante (2019). Mercenary Swedes; French subsidies to Sweden 1631–1796. Translated by Merton, Charlotte. Nordic Academic Press. ISBN 978-91-88661-82-1.
- O'Connell, Daniel Patrick (1968). Richelieu. Weidenfeld & Nicolson.
- Opitz, Walter Theodo (1892), Die Schlacht bei Breitenfeld am 17. September 1631 [The Battle of Breitenfeld on September 17, 1631] (in German), Leipzig: Georg Böhme
- Oredsson, Sverker (2007), Gustav II Adolf (in Swedish), Stockholm: Bokförlaget Atlantis, ISBN 978-91-7353-157-3
- Pantle, Christian; Månsson, Per Lennart (2018), Trettioåriga kriget: när Tyskland stod i lågor och Sverige blev en stormakt [The Thirty Years' War: when Germany was in flames and Sweden became a great power] (in Swedish), Stockholm: Lind & Co, ISBN 978-91-7779-388-5
- Parker, Geoffrey (1997), The Thirty Years' War (2nd ed.), New York: Routledge, ISBN 0-415-12883-8
- Porshnev, Boris Fedorovich (1995). Dukes, Paul (ed.). Muscovy and Sweden in the Thirty Years' War, 1630–1635. Cambridge University Press. ISBN 978-0-521-45139-0.
- Roberts, Keith (2010), Pike and Shot Tactics, 1590–1660, Oxford: Osprey Publishing, ISBN 978-1-84603-469-5
- Rosander, Lars (2003), Sveriges fältmarskalkar: svenska fältherrar från Vasa till Bernadotte [Sweden's field marshals: Swedish warlords from Vasa to Bernadotte] (in Swedish), Lund: Historiska media, ISBN 9189442059
- Rumenius, John (1987), Wästgöta ryttare i 30-åriga kriget: 1000 frivilliga bönder drar ut i kriget 1630 [Västergötland cavalry in the Thirty Year's War: 1000 volunteer farmers go to war in 1630] (in Swedish), Stockholm: Saga Egmont, ISBN 9788726831146
- Sundberg, Ulf (2010), Sveriges krig 1630–1814 [Sweden's wars 1630–1814] (in Swedish), Hallstavik: Svenskt Militärhistoriskt Bibliotek, ISBN 978-91-85789-63-4
- Tucker, Spencer Coakley (2010), Battles That Changed History: An Encyclopedia of World Conflict, Santa Barbara, CA: ABC-CLIO, ISBN 978-1-59884-429-0
- Waitz, Georg (1875), Allgemeine Deutsche Biographie (in German), vol. 1, Leipzig: Duncker & Humblot
- Weigley, Russell Frank (1991), The Age of Battles: The Quest for Decisive Warfare from Breitenfeld to Waterloo, Bloomington, Indiana: Indiana University Press, ISBN 0-253-36380-2
- Wilson, Peter H. (2009), Europe's Tragedy: A History of the Thirty Years War, Allen Lane, ISBN 978-0-7139-9592-3
- Wolke, Lars Ericson; Larsson, Göran; Villstrand, Nils Erik (2006), Trettioåriga kriget [Thirty Year's War] (in Swedish), Lund: Historiska Media, ISBN 91-85377-37-6
- Åselius, Gunnar; Wolke, Lars Ericson (2003), "En revolution i krigskonsten?", Svenska slagfält [Swedish battlefields: 'A revolution in the art of war?'] (in Swedish), Stockholm: Wahlström & Widstrand, ISBN 91-46-20225-0
