= Boitzenburger Land =

- Municipality
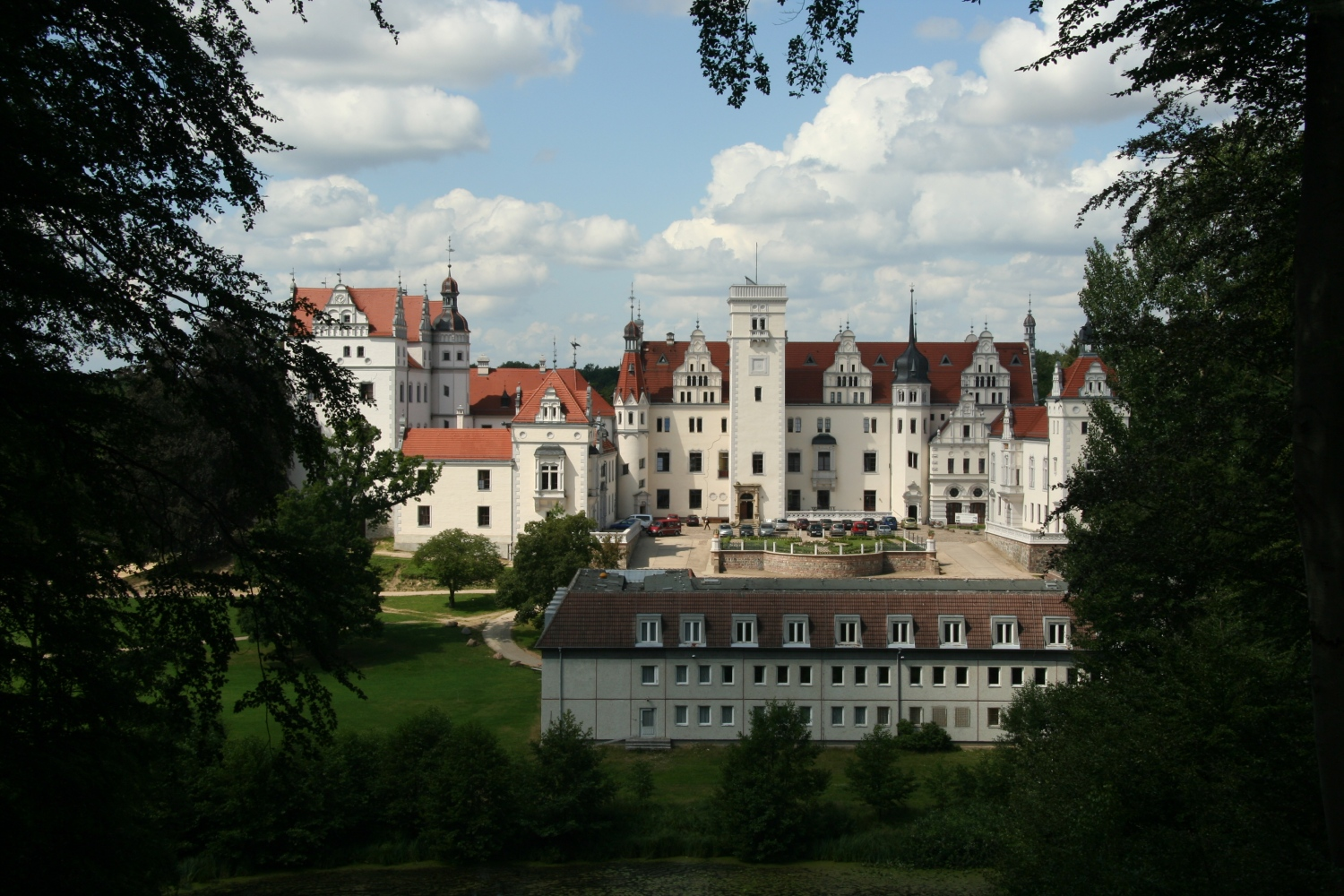
- Boitzenburg Castle

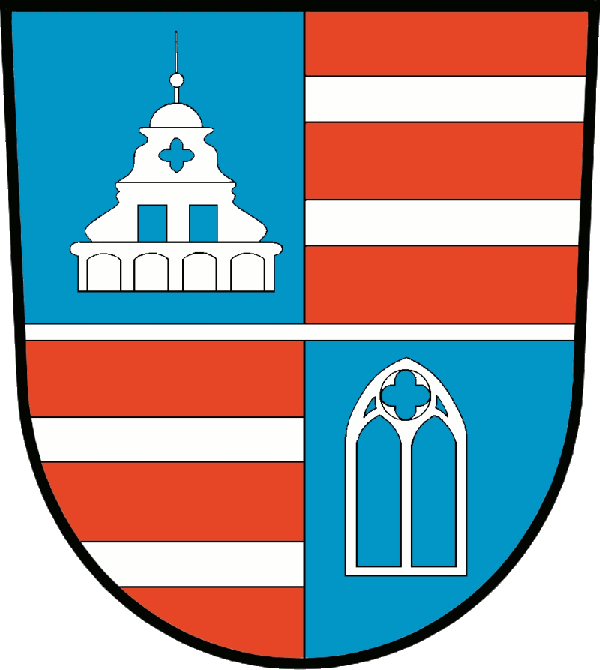
- Coat of arms

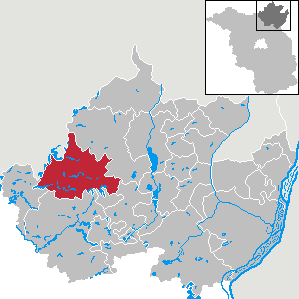
- Location of Boitzenburger Land within Uckermark district
- Interactive map of Boitzenburger Land
- Location within Germany Location within Brandenburg
- Coordinates: 53°16′N 13°36′E
- Country: Germany
- State: Brandenburg
- District: Uckermark

Government
  - Mayor (2016–24): Frank Zimmermann

Area
  - Total: 215.90 km^{2} (83.36 sq mi)
- Elevation: 80 m (260 ft)

Population (2025-12-31)
  - Total: 2,862
  - Density: 13.26/km^{2} (34.33/sq mi)
- Time zone: UTC+01:00 (CET)
  - Summer (DST): UTC+02:00 (CEST)
- Postal codes: 17268
- Dialling codes: 039884, 039885, 039889
- Vehicle registration: UM
- Website: gemeinde-boitzenburger-land.de

Boitzenburger Land is a municipality in the Uckermark district, in Brandenburg, Germany.

== Geography ==
The municipality, with an area of 215.9 square kilometres (83.4 mi^{2}) one of largest in Germany, is located in the northeastern part of Brandenburg, close to the border with the state of Mecklenburg-Vorpommern. The rural community is part of the Uckermark historic region, it is surrounded by extended forests and the Uckermark Lakes Nature Park. In the south, it borders the towns of Templin and Lychen.

== History ==
A settlement named Bozineburc was first mentioned in a 1215 deed. After the whole Uckermark region had passed to the Margraves of Brandenburg according to the 1250 Treaty of Landin, a Cistercian monastery at the site was founded; documented since 1271, about the time when nearby Chorin Abbey was established. In 1536 the abbey was secularised during the Protestant Reformation and devastated by Danish troops in the Thirty Years' War one hundred years later.

Boitzenburg Castle was first mentioned in 1276, it was occupied by Margrave William I of Meissen in 1398 but returned to Brandenburg in 1415. From 1429 the estates were held by the Arnim noble family. Damaged in the Thirty Years' War, when it was a possession of Field Marshal Hans Georg von Arnim-Boitzenburg, the fortress was rebuilt by his descendants in a Baroque style from 1740 onwards. Refurbished according to plans designed by Friedrich August Stüler between 1838 and 1842, it received its present Neo-Renaissance appearance in 1881–1884. The adjacent landscape garden was laid out by Peter Joseph Lenné around 1840. Boitzenburg was then held by Adolf Heinrich von Arnim-Boitzenburg, who became the first Minister President of Prussia in 1848.

After World War II, the Arnim family was disseized and the castle was used as recreation home of the East German National People's Army. Today it houses a hotel. The present-day municipality was established by the merger of ten villages in 1992.

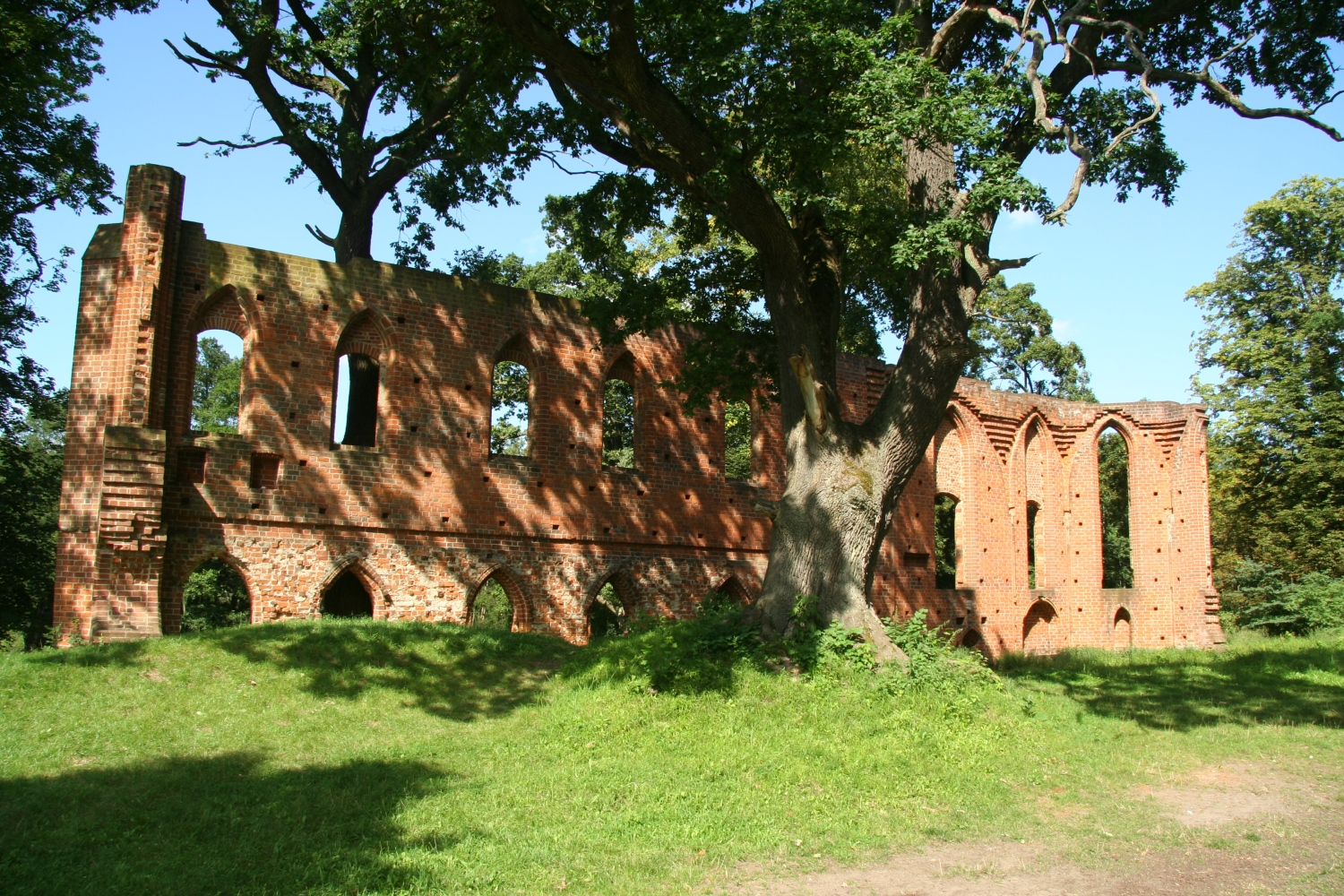
Monastery ruins

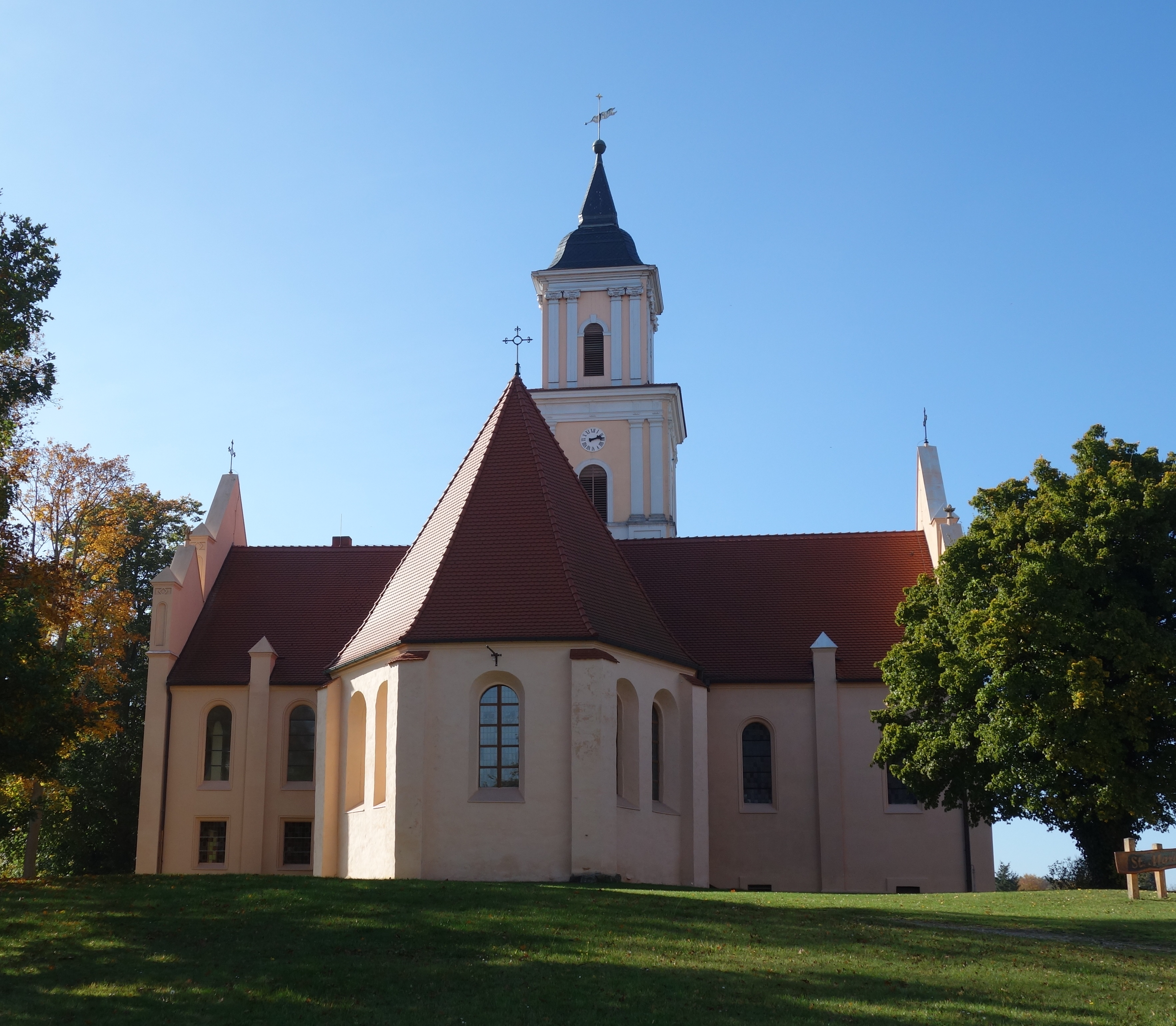
St. Marien church

== Demography ==
Development of population since 1875 within the current Boundaries (Blue Line: Population; Dotted Line: Comparison to Population development in Brandenburg state; Grey Background: Time of Nazi Germany; Red Background: Time of communist East Germany)

Recent Population Development and Projections (Population Development before Census 2011 (blue line); Recent Population Development according to the Census in Germany in 2011 (blue bordered line); Official projections for 2005-2030 (yellow line); for 2017-2030 (scarlet line); for 2020-2030 (green line)

Boitzenburger Land: Population development
within the current boundaries (2020)

Year	Pop.	±% p.a.
1875	5,797	—
1890	5,687	−0.13%
1910	5,234	−0.41%
1925	5,504	+0.34%
1939	5,019	−0.66%
1950	7,443	+3.65%
1964	5,677	−1.92%

Year	Pop.	±% p.a.
1971	5,365	−0.80%
1981	4,918	−0.87%
1985	5,068	+0.75%
1990	5,251	+0.71%
1995	4,997	−0.99%
2000	4,631	−1.51%
2005	4,119	−2.32%

Year	Pop.	±% p.a.
2010	3,668	−2.29%
2015	3,213	−2.61%
2016	3,169	−1.37%
2017	3,151	−0.57%
2018	3,102	−1.56%
2019	3,089	−0.42%
2020	3,112	+0.74%

== People from Boitzenburger Land ==
- Hans Georg von Arnim-Boitzenburg (1583-1641) German field marshal and landowner
- Georg Abraham von Arnim (1651-1734), Prussian field marshal and landowner
- Adolf von Arnim-Boitzenburg (1832-1887), Prussian politician and landowner
- Joachim Dietlof von Arnim-Boitzenburg (1898–1972), landowner
