= Blue Brigade (military unit) =

Blue Regiment
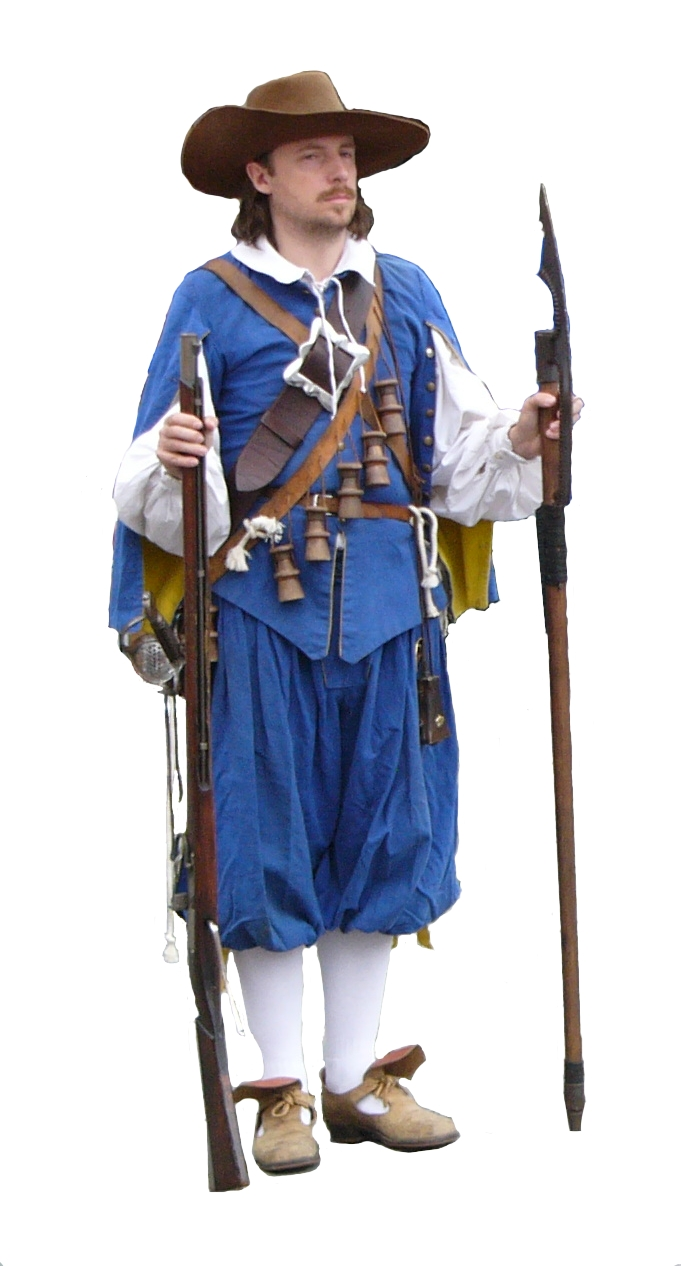
- Musketeer of the Blue regiment
- Active: c. 1624-1652
- Country: Kingdom of Sweden
- Size: c. 1200 (later 16 companies)
- Colors: Blue
- Engagements: Thirty Years' War

Commanders
- 1624: Hans Georg von Arnim-Boitzenburg
- 1625: Maximilian Teuffel
- 1627: Hans von der Noth
- 1629: Hans Kaspar von Klitzing
- 1630: Hans Georg aus dem Winckel

The Blue Regiment or the Blue Brigade was an infantry regiment in the service of Gustav II Adolph during his campaigns in Germany in the Thirty Years' War. A large portion of the regiment was made up of German mercenaries, who were a common phenomenon on both sides. The regiment's name is derived from the blue colored uniforms worn by the soldiers.

The regiment was raised around 1624 during the Polish–Swedish War of 1621–25, originally recruited from Swedish provinces. Following the landing of Gustavus Adolphus and his army in Pomerania, new recruits came from local German inhabitants to fill the ranks. From 1630 onward, the Blue regiment took part in almost every battle of the Swedish intervention in the Thirty Years' War, such as the battle of Breitenfeld (1631), Lützen (1632) and Nördlingen (1634). Battle of Lützen in particular, where it is referred to as the "Old Blue" regiment, though this name was official from 1634 only, was disastrous to the regiment as it lost more than half of its veteran soldiers from the recurring attacks of the Imperial cavalry and the heavy enemy volleys.

The "Old Blue" regiment was replenished and once again achieved prominence fighting under Swedish general Johan Banér in a number of major battles from 1635-1641, but was once again devastated at the Battle of Wolfenbüttel in June 1641. One of the regiment's last major engagements was at the Battle of Jankau in 1645.

Term brigade is derived from a Swedish infantry formation called the "Swedish Brigade", which was developed by Gustavus Adolphus during his military reforms. Normally, a brigade would be composed of 2 regiments divided into 4 or 3 squadrons of c. 400 men each, though in some cases, a double sized regiment of around 16 or more companies was able to form a brigade on its own, as it was later with the Blue and Yellow regiments.

The regiment was officially dissolved in 1652 with the other colored regiments having been dissolved around 1638 or before.

It was later resurrected in 1949 as the Göta Life Guards, which was dissolved in 1980.
