= Blood and Iron =

Blood and Iron may refer to:

- Blood and Iron (speech), an 1862 speech given by Otto von Bismarck
- American Empire: Blood and Iron, a 2001 war novel by Harry Turtledove
- Blood and Iron, a 2006 novel by Elizabeth Bear
- Blood and Iron: The Rise and Fall of the German Empire 1871–1918, a 2021 book by Katja Hoyer
- "Blood and Iron", a song by Bathory from Twilight of the Gods, 1991
- "Blood and Iron", a song by Cirith Ungol from One Foot in Hell, 1986
- "Blood and Iron", a song by Overkill from Feel the Fire, 1985
- Hellboy: Blood and Iron, a 2007 animated film
- Blood & Iron: Bismarck's Wars for Empire, 1993 board wargame by Pacific Rim Publishing

== See also ==
- Iron & Blood: Warriors of Ravenloft
- Blood and Steel
- Human iron metabolism
