= Blood and Steel =

Blood and Steel may refer to:

- Titanic: Blood and Steel, 2012 television drama series about the construction of the RMS Titanic
- Blood and Steel (1925 film), American silent western drama film
- Blood and Steel (1959 film), American drama film

== See also ==
- Blood and Iron
