= Blood & Iron: Bismarck's Wars for Empire =

Blood & Iron: Bismarck's Wars for Empire is a 1993 board game published by Pacific Rim Publishing.

== Gameplay ==
Blood & Iron: Bismarck's Wars for Empire is a game in which a corps‑level nineteenth‑century campaign wargame has players maneuver armies across a zoned map, manage morale, leaders, supply, fortresses, and national intervention triggers, resolving battles through modifiers and dice to achieve scenario‑specific victory conditions.

== Reception ==
Perfidious Albion felt that "More a game to tinker with than to play. It is a little too much for modern tastes but tempting stuff."

== Reviews ==
- Berg's Review of Games#14
