= Julius Mankell =

Swedish politician and historian (1828–1897)

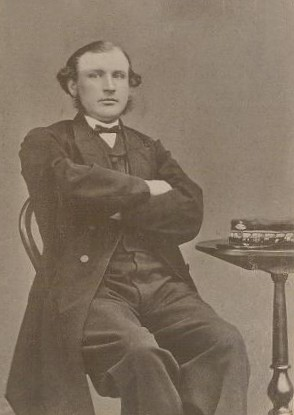
Julius Mankell

Julius Mankell (8 June 1828 – 23 February 1897) was a Swedish libertarian politician and military historian.
