= Uckermark Lakes Nature Park =

Nature park in Brandenburg, Germany

- IUCN category V (protected landscape/seascape)
- Location within Germany
- Location: Brandenburg, Germany
- Nearest city: Templin
- Coordinates: 53°09′36″N 13°24′18″E
- Area: 897 km^{2} (346 sq mi)
- Established: May 3, 1997
- Governing body: Naturparkverwaltung Zehdenicker Str. 1 17279 Lychen

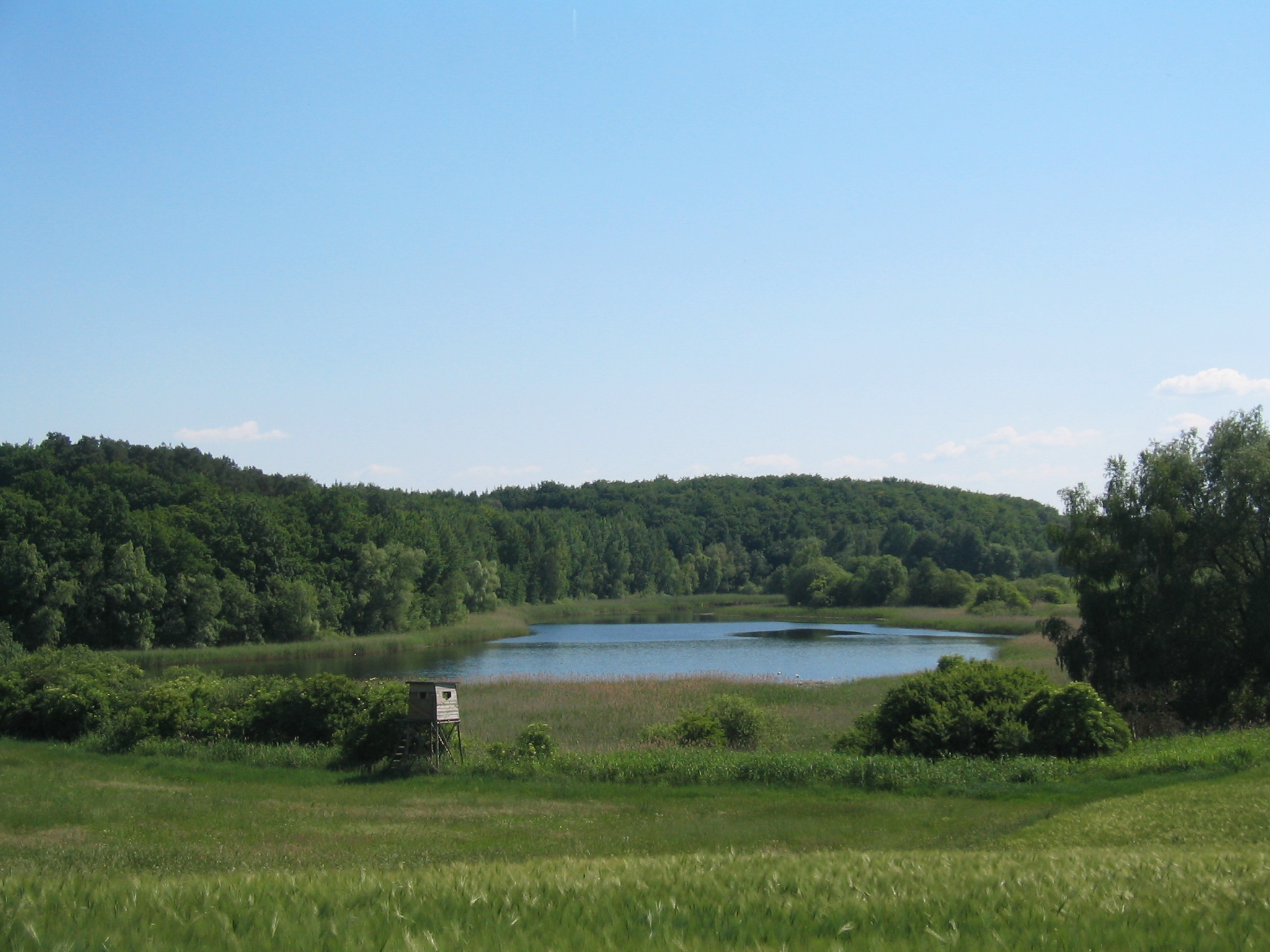

Uckermark Lakes Nature Park is a nature park and reserve in the state of Brandenburg, Germany. It covers an area of 895 km^{2} (346 sq mi). It was established on May 3, 1997, and is located on the northern edge of Brandenburg state. The nature park is bordered to the north by the Feldberg Lake District Nature Park, to the west by the Stechlin-Ruppiner Land Nature Park and to the southeast by the Schorfheide-Chorin Biosphere Reserve. The landscape was marked by the last ice age 15.000 years ago: pushed moraine with numerous lakes and ponds, extensive woodlands, mires, dry meadows and heaths. Many left behind blocks of stone, called erratics, are evidence of the glaciers from Scandinavia.

The Heraldic beast of the nature park is the osprey, which lives here in an unusual density. Other rare animals such as the brown trout, the European otter, the European pond turtle and the European crayfish, are living there. One of the rare plants of Europe, the straw yellow early marsh-orchid (Dactylorhiza incarnata subsp. ochroleuca) can be found here.
