= Peter H. Wilson =

British historian (born 1963)

Peter H. Wilson FRHistS
- Born: Peter Hamish Wilson; 27 November 1963 (age 62)
- Occupations: Historian and academic
- Title: Chichele Professor of the History of War

Academic background
- Education: University of Liverpool; Jesus College, Cambridge
- Doctoral advisor: T. C. W. Blanning

Academic work
- Discipline: History
- Sub-discipline: Military history; Germany in the early modern period
- Institutions: University of Sunderland; Newcastle University; University of Hull; All Souls College, Oxford

Peter Hamish Wilson FRHistS (born 27 November 1963) is a British historian specialising in German history and European military history. Since 2015, he has held the Chichele Professor of the History of War chair at All Souls College, University of Oxford.

== Biography ==
Wilson studied at the University of Liverpool (BA) and Jesus College, Cambridge (PhD). His doctoral supervisor was T. C. W. Blanning of Sidney Sussex College. In 1990 he became a lecturer in Modern European History at the University of Sunderland and in 1994, at Newcastle University. In 1998, he returned to Sunderland as a Reader, and was subsequently Professor of Early Modern History at the University of Sunderland from 2001 to 2006. From 2007 to 2015 he was Grant Professor of History at the University of Hull. In 2011 he was Visiting Fellow at the Center of Excellence of the Westfälische Wilhelms-Universität in Münster. He also held additional teaching assignments at High Point University, High Point, North Carolina, and National War College, Washington, DC. In 2015 he succeeded Hew Strachan as holder of the Chichele Professor of the History of War chair at All Souls College, University of Oxford.

From 2002 to 2010, he and Michael Schaich organized workshops of the German History Society at the German Historical Institute London (DHIL). He was also co-curator of several exhibitions: 1998 at the Hatton Gallery in Newcastle (theme: "Africa in the European Imagination") and 2012 in the New Palace in Potsdam (theme: "Great Britain, America, and the Atlantic World"). He belongs, among others, to the Editorial Advisory Boards of the following journals: The International History Review (2006–2010), War and Society, and the Journal of Military History. Wilson is also a Fellow of the Royal Historical Society (FRHistS).

== Works ==
- War, State and Society in Württemberg, 1677–1793 (= Cambridge Studies in Early Modern History). Cambridge University Press, Cambridge 1995, ISBN 0-521-47302-0.
- German Armies. War and German Politics, 1648–1806. UCL Press, London 1998, ISBN 1-85728-106-3.
- Absolutism in Central Europe (Historical Connections Series). Routledge, London 2000, ISBN 0-415-23351-8.
- From Reich to Revolution. German History, 1558–1806. Palgrave Macmillan, Houndmills 2004, ISBN 0-333-65244-4.
- (editor): 1848. The Year of Revolutions (International Library of Essays in Political History). Ashgate, Aldershot 2006, ISBN 978-0-7546-2569-8.
- (editor): Warfare in Europe 1815–1914 (= International Library of Military History). Ashgate, Aldershot 2006, ISBN 978-0-7546-2478-3.
- (editor): A Companion to Eighteenth-Century Europe. Blackwell, Oxford 2008, ISBN 978-1-4051-3947-2.
- (editor): with Alan Forrest: The Bee and the Eagle: Napoleonic France and the end of the Holy Roman Empire, 1806. Palgrave, Basingstoke 2009, ISBN 978-0-230-00893-9.
- Europe’s Tragedy: A History of the Thirty Years War. Allen Lane, London 2009, ISBN 978-0-14-193780-9.
- (editor): The Thirty Years War: A Sourcebook. Palgrave, Basingstoke 2010, ISBN 978-0-230-24205-0.
- (editor): with Robert John Weston Evans (Hrsg.): The Holy Roman Empire, 1495–1806: A European Perspective. Brill, Leiden 2012, ISBN 978-90-04-20683-0.
- The Holy Roman Empire. A Thousand Years of Europe’s History. Allen Lane, London 2016, ISBN 978-1-84614-318-2.
- Great Battles: Lützen. Oxford University Press, 2018, ISBN 978-0-19964-254-0
- Iron and Blood: A Military History of the German-Speaking Peoples since 1500. Harvard University Press, 2023, ISBN 978-0-67498-762-3
