= Hans Georg von Arnim-Boitzenburg =

German general (1583–1641)

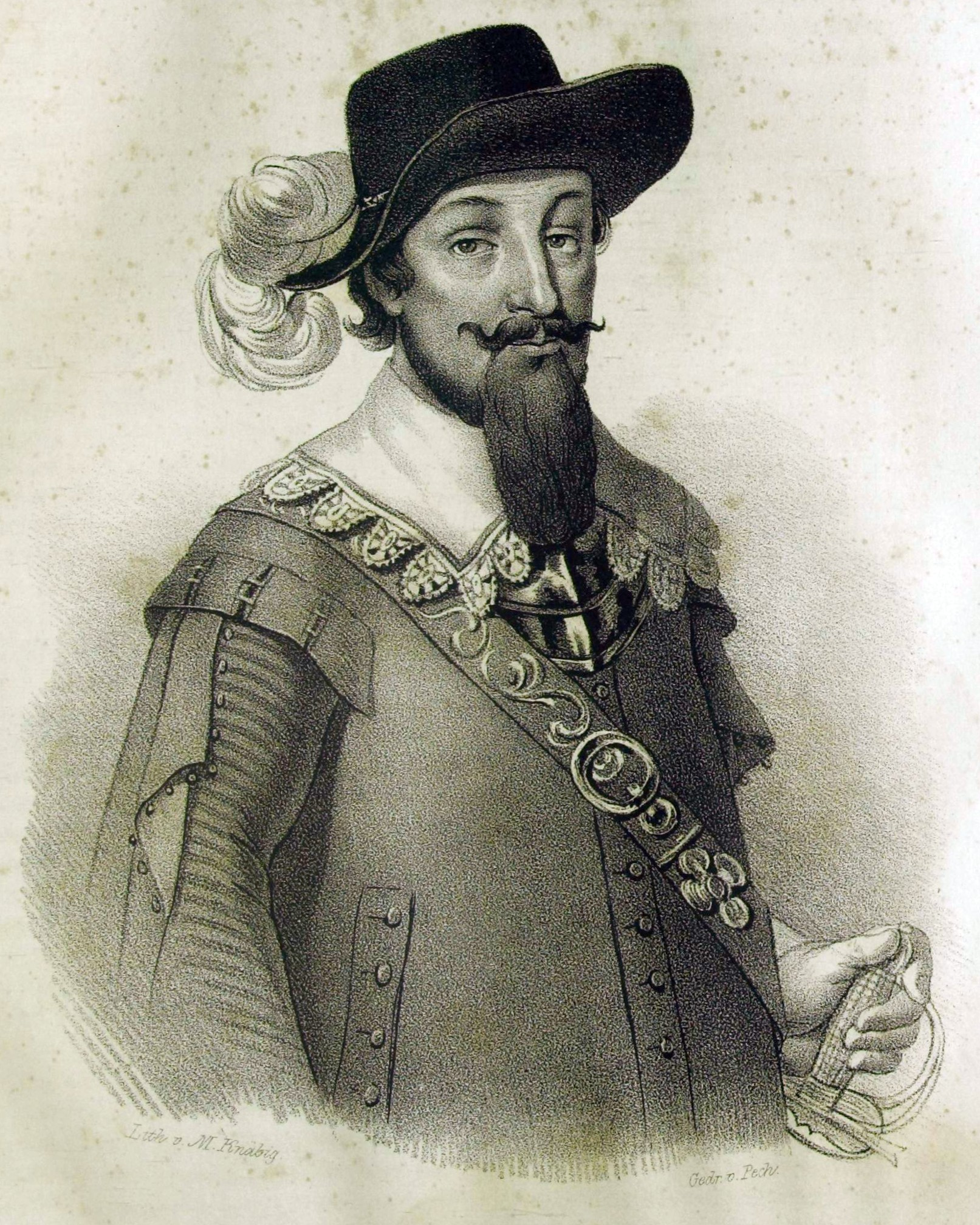
Hans Georg von Arnim-Boitzenburg.

Johann or Hans Georg von Arnim-Boitzenburg (1583 in Boitzenburger Land – 28 April 1641, in Dresden) was a German Field Marshal. At different times during the Thirty Years' War, he was a Field Marshal for the Holy Roman Empire and its opponent the Electorate of Saxony. He also pursued various diplomatic tasks.

== Biography ==
Arnim was born in Boitzenburger Land, Brandenburg. After studies at Frankfurt (Oder), Leipzig, and Rostock, he entered into service at the Prussian court at Königsberg in 1612, a post he had to leave the next year because of a duel. He aided the Swedish army under Gustavus Adolphus against Russia from 1613 to 1617. During a number of years he was sent on secret mission between Gustav Adolph of Sweden and the Elector of Brandenburg to arrange the marriage to Maria Eleonora of Brandenburg, then 1621–22 with his German regiment aided the king of Poland-Lithuania in action against the Ottoman Empire.

In 1626, although a Protestant, he was persuaded by Wallenstein to enter into the army of the Holy Roman Empire. He quickly rose to the rank of field marshal, and won the esteem of his soldiers as well as that of his commander, whose close friend and faithful ally he became. This attachment to Wallenstein, and a spirit of religious toleration, were the leading motives of a strange career of military and political inconstancy.

Arnim, a devoted Lutheran himself, was sent with his imperial troops by the emperor Ferdinand II to aid Swedish-Polish King Sigismund III in the battle against the Lutheran Gustavus Adolphus of Sweden on 17 June 1629 at Stuhm. Arnim and his troops carried out this task very reluctantly. When the Polish did not pay the troops they mutinied or went over to the Swedish side.

Arnim left the imperial service on account of the Edict of Restitution and Wallenstein's dismissal. He entered that of the Elector John George of Saxony, and was in command of the left wing of the army of Gustavus Adolphus at Breitenfeld (1631); indeed the alliance of Sweden and Saxony, two Protestant powers, in the cause of their common religion was largely his work. He then invaded Bohemia, took Prague, and was victorious at Nimburg (today Nymburk), and in 1632 returned to Saxony, then fought in Brandenburg and Silesia. He was one of the principal agents in the negotiations between John George and Wallenstein, which were terminated by the latter's death in 1634. After this, he defeated the imperial army at Liegnitz and operated in conjunction with Baner in Bohemia.

In protest at the Peace of Prague, Arnim left the Saxon forces in 1635 and retired from active life. He was kidnapped by Axel Oxenstierna, for alleged intrigues against Sweden, and was taken to Stockholm in 1637, but escaped to Hamburg in November 1638 and thereafter devoted himself to freeing Germany from foreign domination. He was carrying on a campaign, as lieutenant general of the imperial and Saxon forces against the French and Swedes, when he died in Dresden.
