= Christian IV's naval expedition to Stockholm =

Failed Danish attack on Stockholm

Naval Expedition to Stockholm
- Part of the Kalmar War
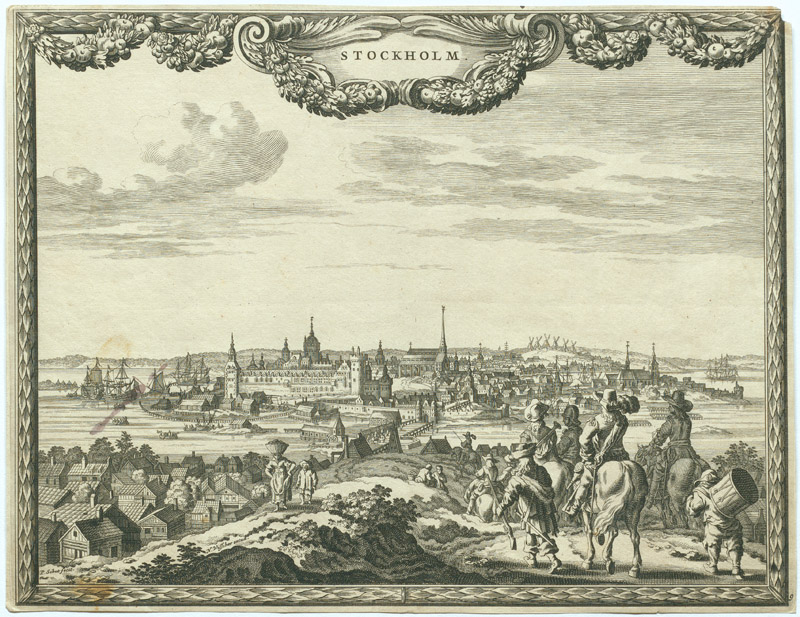
- Copper engraving of Stockholm viewed from Norrmalm, by Nicolaes Visscher I, 1660
Date	31 August – 10 September 1612
Location	Stockholm, Sweden
Result	Swedish victory

Belligerents
(yes) Swedish Empire	Denmark–Norway

Commanders and leaders
Gustavus Adolphus; Johan von Monickhouen; Göran Gyllenstierna; Mårten Krakow; Emerentia Krakow	Christian IV; Peder Nielsen

Strength
2,500 men; Several longboats	>1,000 men; 36 ships

The Naval Expedition to Stockholm (Swedish: Sjötåget mot Stockholm; Danish: Kristian IV's Tog mod Stockholm) occurred from 31 August to 10 September 1612, during the late stages of the 1611–1613 Kalmar War. A Danish fleet of 36 warships under Christian IV attempted to capture Stockholm, the de facto capital of the Swedish Empire but failed. This was due to poor planning by Christian, who did not bring sufficient troops with him to seriously entertain capturing the city, as well as the Swedes' stalwart defence of Stockholm and their fortifications of the westernmost inlet leading to the city, in the form of Vaxholm Fortress.

The Kalmar War would end just over 4 months later in January 1613 with a Dano-Norwegian victory, but Christian would not gain the decisive defeat over the Swedes that he had sought at Stockholm to gain leverage over and better terms from Sweden.

== Background ==
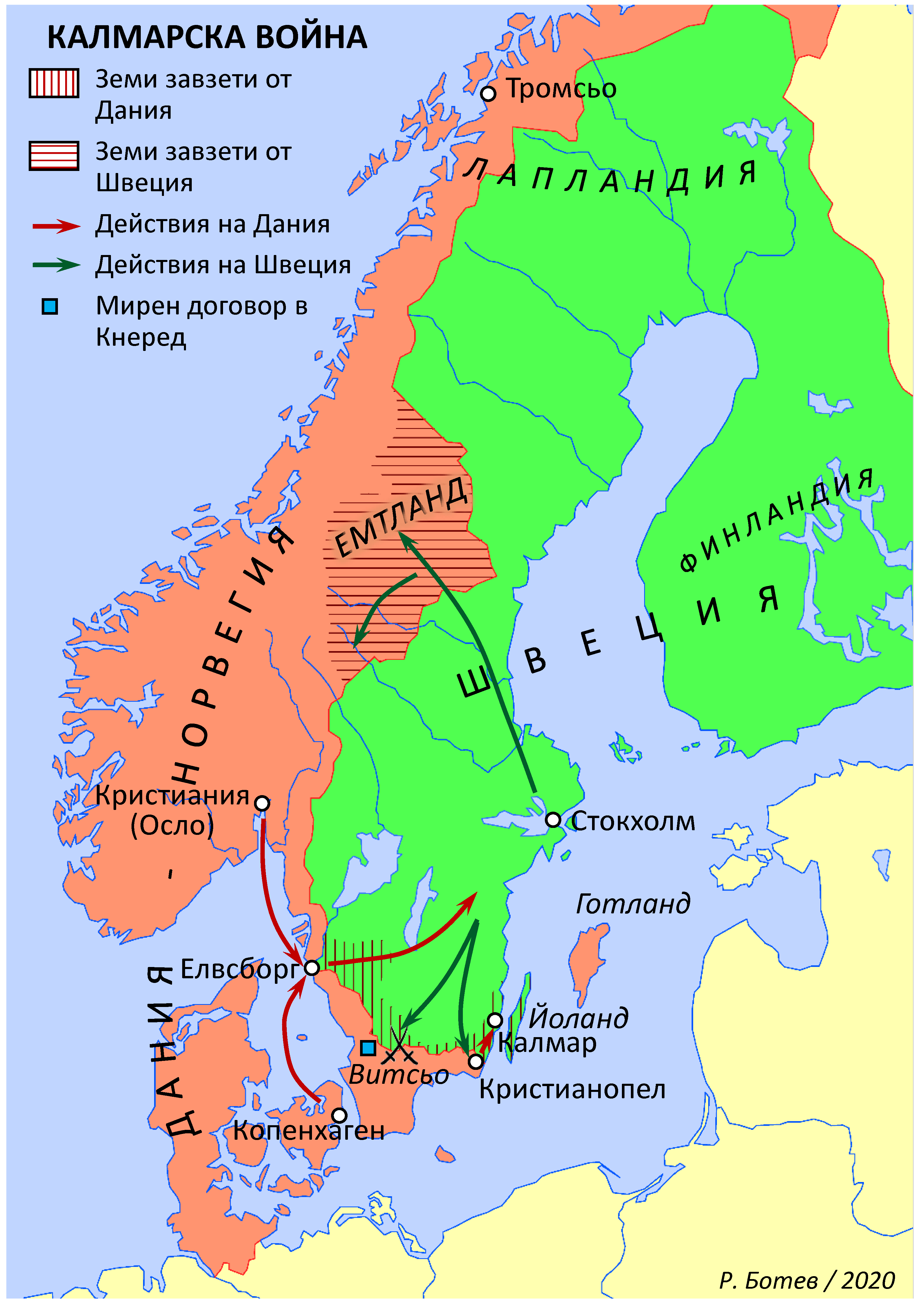
Map showing the Swedish Empire (in green) and Denmark–Norway (in orange) during the Kalmar War of 1611–1613

In late July 1612, the main Danish fleet returned to Copenhagen, the capital of Denmark–Norway. Meanwhile, the main Swedish fleet had set out from Älvsnabben, near Stockholm, Sweden, on 24 July, commanded by Grand Admiral Göran Gyllenstierna. The Swedish fleet then sailed towards Öland, before turning south-east towards the Bay of Danzig. Here, it operated from 29 July to 6 August, searching for the Danish fleet. During this search, the Swedes captured several merchantmen, before giving up the search and returning to Älvsnabben on 10 August.

By this time, King Christian IV of Denmark and Norway had given up on his previous strategies for the war. Rather than focussing on his army, he decided instead to give the task of defeating the Swedes to his navy, which he had spent considerable time and money on improving. On 11 or 13 August, he set out from Copenhagen with the main Danish fleet of some 36 warships. In Kalmar, from 16 to 20 August, he embarked several units from Gert von Rantzau's army who had recently undertaken the reconquest of the island of Öland in May and June. In total, some 1,000 of Rantzau's musketeers were embarked, according to Swedish sources. This was in addition to an unspecified amount that Christian had already taken with him from Copenhagen.

Having learned that the Swedish fleet was last seen sailing towards Danzig, Christian decided to pursue it there, hoping to inflict a crushing defeat on the Swedes and achieve naval supremacy in the process. The Danish fleet circled around Öland before sailing to Danzig, where it anchored from 24 to 25 August. However, the Swedish fleet had long since sailed back north to Sweden. Upon realising this, Christian instead decided that his fleet would attack Stockholm, the de facto capital of the Swedish Empire and the centre of Swedish naval power at the time.

In the Stockholm Archipelago, there were two main sea routes that led into the capital from the Baltic Sea, with both situated to the north-east. Of these two routes, the westernmost route was protected by Vaxholm Fortress, while the easternmost route was less fortified. Since the reign of Gustav Vasa, attempts had been made to block this route by scuttling of obsolete ships in the channel.

== Expedition ==
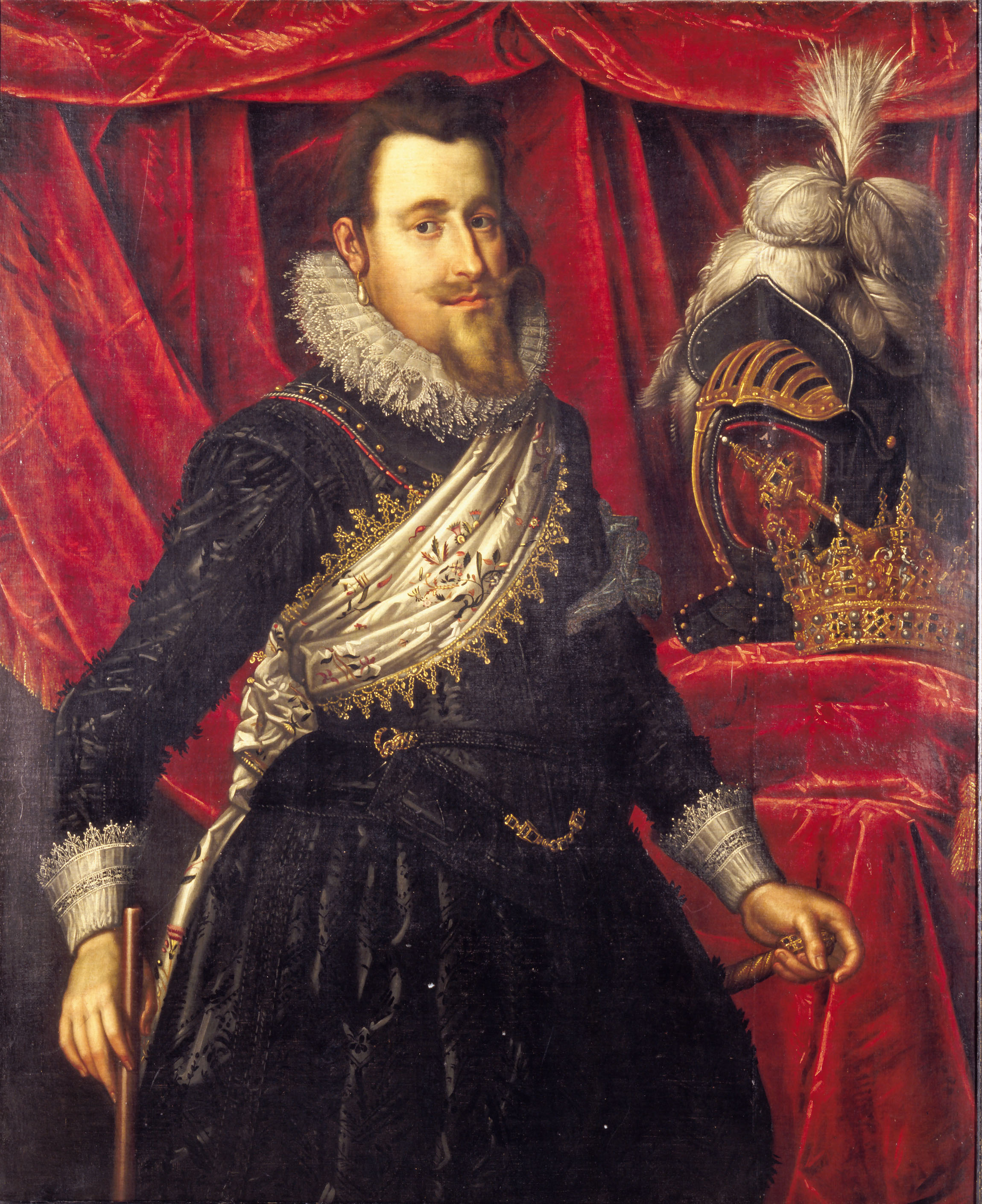
Painting of King Christian IV of Denmark and Norway, by Pieter Isaacsz, circa 1612

On 31 August, the Danish fleet reached the Stockholm Archipelago, where it encountered several units of the Swedish navy. Skirmishes between Swedish and Danish longboats quickly erupted. The Swedes, under Göran Gyllenstierna, soon withdrew to Vaxholm, which barred the inlet leading to Stockholm. Instead of sailing on forward, Christian instead chose to raise a memorial on one of the nearby islands to commemorate his victory over the Swedes during the recent skirmishes. While the memorial was being raised, Swedish inshore ships and gunners repeatedly attacked the Danish fleet. Eventually, Christian ordered one of his subordinates, Peder Nielsen, to take a longboat from each ship, and then use them to engage the Swedes. What followed soon turned into a rowing battle between the Danes under Nielsen and the Swedes under Johan von Monickhouen, who had recently arrived in Stockholm with an enlisted Dutch regiment of some 1,200 men.

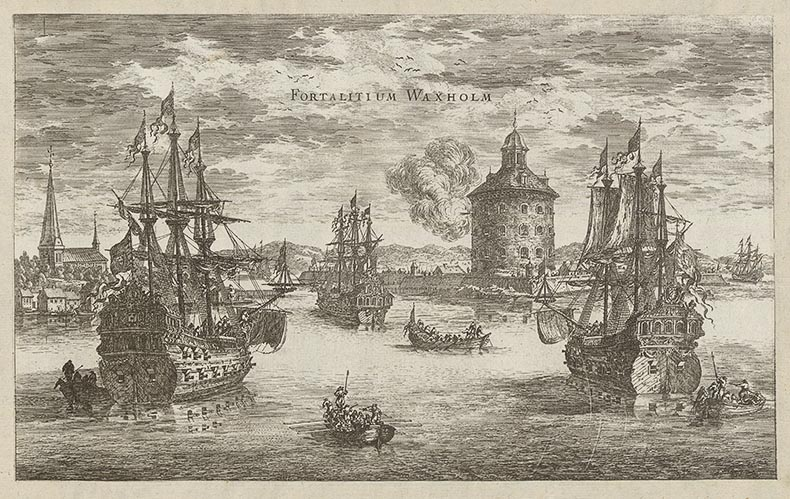
Engraving of Vaxholm Fortress which protected the westernmost of the two sea routes leading into Stockholm, by Erik Dahlbergh, circa 1700

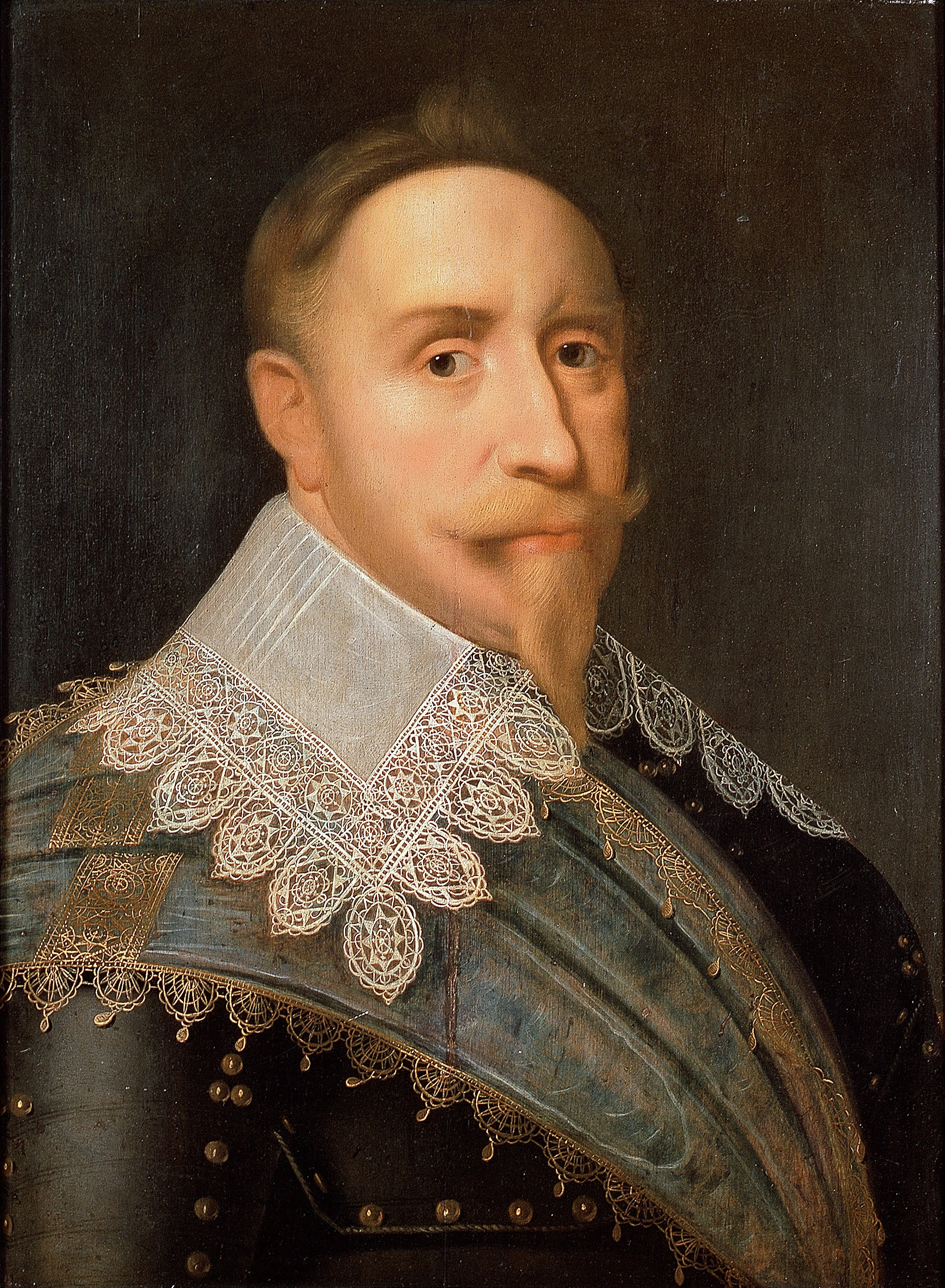
Painting of King Gustavus Adolphus of Sweden, attributed to Jacob Hoefnagel, 1624

Nielsen, possessing greater firepower than the Swedes, managed to repulse them, and the Swedes withdrew. After this, Nielsen landed on the island from which the Swedes had departed, capturing eight or ten prisoners, and seizing three pyrotechnic weapons which the Swedes had used to attack the Danish ships during the night.

On 2 September, the Danish fleet had reached Vaxholm Fortress. The fortress had been defended by a garrison of around 50 men since May 1612, under Mårten Krakow and his wife, Emerentia Krakow, who now sought to prevent the Danish fleet from reaching Stockholm. The King of Sweden, Gustavus Adolphus, received reports of the Danish fleet's advance on Stockholm. He subsequently rushed from Jönköping, arriving in Stockholm at 3AM on 9 September, having travelled 340 kilometres in three days. Two hours later, he continued onwards towards Vaxholm. The defences in Stockholm were quickly improved, and volunteer levies from Dalecarlia were called upon, forced marching towards Stockholm to aid in its defence. There was panic among those in the city, where many feared that the Danes would break through Vaxholm Fortress and attack the city. The Queen dowager, Christina, left the city for Gripsholm Castle with all of her valuables, but this was to prove unnecessary.

On 4 September, Christian IV abandoned his attempt at attacking and capturing Stockholm. In reality, the expedition had been doomed to fail from the outset. Despite his strong fleet, the troops he had on his ships were insufficient for his ambition to capture Stockholm, and his ambition was therefore hopeless. After Monickhouen's arrival with the enlisted Dutch regiment, the Swedish forces in Stockholm consisted of some 2,500 men.

== Aftermath ==
Although Christian was not incompetent, his plan proved unrealistic. It is speculated that he believed a mere show of force would endue Stockholm to capitulate. If it had, it would have provided the leverage at the negation table needed to end the war on more favourable terms for Denmark-Norway.

On 10 September, after having suffered from unfavourable winds which slowed the Danish retreat, the Danish fleet finally left the Stockholm Archipelago and sailed south. Christian IV left the fleet on Bornholm on 13 September, transferring command over to Admiral of the Realm, Mogens Ulfeldt, and arrived back in Copenhagen on 17 September.

The Kalmar War continued for a short while longer, finally ending with the Treaty of Knäred on 21 January 1613, just over 4 months later. An outcome that was a Dano-Norwegian victory. Christian was persuaded to sign this peace treaty with the Swedish Empire by England, while low on funds due his reliance on mercenaries. England had a vested interest in Baltic Sea trade, which was being hampered by the war. The treaty came before Christian could attain a decisive negotiating position over the Swedish Empire which he had sought 4 months prior with his naval expedition to Stockholm, which was the last notable engagement of the Kalmar War.

== Bibliography ==
- Essen, Michael Fredholm von (9 August 2023). The Kalmar War 1611−1613: Gustavus Adolphus's First War. Warwick: Helion & Company. ISBN 978-1-80-451006-3.
- Sveriges krig, 1611−1632 (6 volumes) [Sweden's Wars, 1611−1632] (in Swedish). Vol. I. Stockholm: V. Petterson. 1936. OCLC 13097373.
- Isacson, Claes-Göran (2006). Vägen till stormakt: Vasaättens krig [The Road to Great Power: The Wars of the Vasa Dynasty] (in Swedish). Stockholm: Norstedts. ISBN 978-9-11-301502-6.
