= Henrik Below =

Danish nobleman and diplomat

Henrik Below (1540–1607) was a Danish nobleman and diplomat.

== Career ==
He was the son of Claus Below and Dorothea Golitz. He attended the University of Rostock.

He acquired Spøttrup Castle from the Danish crown in 1579 and made substantial alterations to the building. In 1583 he married Lisbet Lauridsdatter Skram (1563-1600) and Johannes Caselius wrote a Latin epithalamium.

In 1585 Henrik Below, Manderup Parsberg, and Nicolaus Theophilus were appointed ambassadors to Scotland. They arrived in June, while there was plague in Scotland and James VI of Scotland was in the country at Falkland Palace in Fife. James VI appointed Sir James Melville of Halhill, William Schaw, and the Laird of Segie to be companions to the ambassadors. Melville, and the English diplomat Edward Wotton, described the events of the embassy. The Danish diplomats arrived at Leith on Saturday 8 June 1585, according to Wotton their ship was intended as a gift to King James. As there was plague in Edinburgh, they went to Dunfermline.

At Dunfermline Palace they discussed the disputed ownership of the Orkney Islands and the king's marriage. They were not treated in the usual manner but had to pay their own expenses, and when they were to travel to St Andrews the promised horses were late. At St Andrews they suffered some abuse organised by supporters of the pro-French faction. The ringleader was a leading courtier James Stewart, Earl of Arran who had served in Sweden. The English ambassador Edward Wotton helped the Danish diplomats because England and Denmark were allies, and he told them privately that James VI had criticised Danish customs and their king Frederick II. According to Melville, the Danish envoys considered leaving Scotland, but he persuaded them to continue and spoke to James VI in their favour. When the mission was concluded, the three Danish ambassadors were supposed to receive gifts of gold chains but these were not ready. The Master of Gray described the discussion in the Parliament of Scotland in July 1585 to give an answer to the Danish embassy regarding a league or peace treaty involving England.

In May 1587 the Scottish ambassadors Patrick Vans of Barnbarroch and Peter Young were sent to Denmark, to discuss the Orkney Islands and arrange for a marriage between James VI and Elizabeth. They went to Antvorskov to meet Frederick II of Denmark, but he was ill with toothache and would not see them, and they spoke to Below and Parsberg.

Henrik Below was with Christian IV of Denmark and his mother Sophie of Mecklenburg-Güstrow in the palace of Koldinghus at Kolding on 29 July 1590. They entertained the Scottish ambassadors John Skene and William Stewart. At dinner the Scottish ambassadors were seated at one table with the king, Peder Munk, Peder Gyldenstierne, Steen Brahe, Hak Holgersen Ulfstand, Henrik Below, and Breide Rantzau.

He came to England for the coronation of King James and was lodged with Christian Friis at Richmond Palace.

Henrik Below died in 1607.
