= Emerentia Krakow =

Swedish defender of Gullberg Fortress (died 1648)

Emerentia Påvelsdotter Krakow née Pauli (died 1648), was a Swedish woman involved in warfare, known as the defender of the Gullberg Fortress against the Danish at Gothenburg during the Swedish-Danish Kalmar War in 1612.

== Life ==
Emerentia was married to the commendant of Gullberg Fortress, Mårten Krakow, in 1604 and had six children. In 1612, the fortress was attacked by Denmark during the Kalmar War. After having been wounded, Mårten Krakow left the defence of the fortress to his wife.

At the Danish attack 27 January 1612, she successfully repelled five attacks during a period of six hours : by the help of the soldier's wives, she, among other things, loaded and fired the cannons. By her acts, the Danes were defeated. Her husband was promoted to governor of Vaxholm in 1612, and when he was retired in 1613, it was pointed out, that he was given his pension in recognition of his and his wife’s bravery in their defense of the country.

In September 1612 she defended Vaxholm Fortress, with her husband, during Christian IV's naval expedition to Stockholm.

She became a widow in 1616, and is said to have managed her estates forcefully.

== Legacy ==
Her defence of Gullberg was described by her daughter Cecilia (d. 1683) and published in 1760. In Gothenburg, a road is named after her: Emerentias backe, near Skansen Lejonet.
