= Peder Munk =

Danish admiral

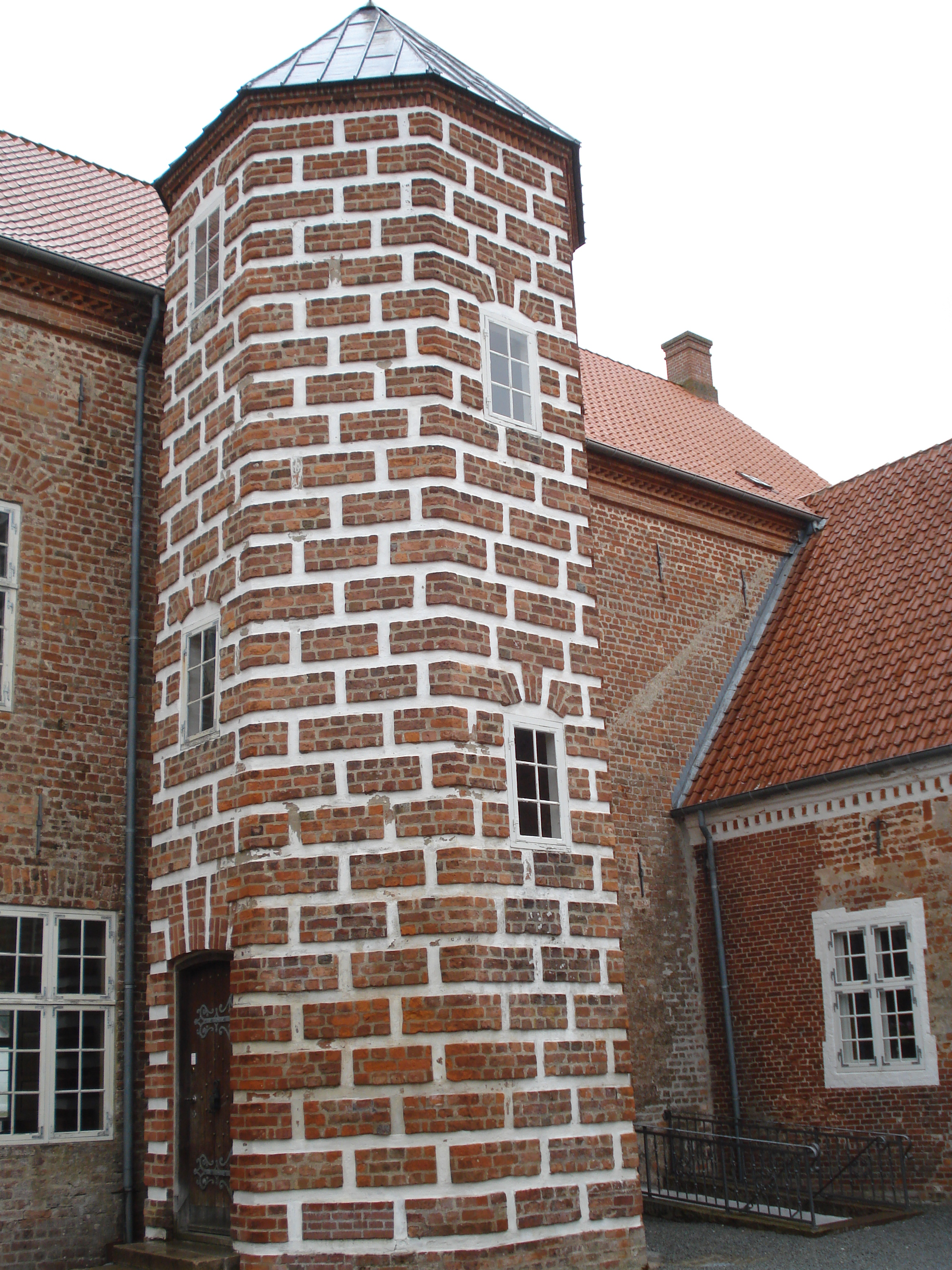
The stair tower at Sæbygård, Peder Munk's home from 1589.

Peder Munk of Estvadgård (22 April 1534 – 1623), was a Danish navigator, politician, and ambassador, who was in charge of the fleet carrying Anne of Denmark to Scotland. The events of the voyage led to witch trials and executions in Denmark and Scotland.

== Career ==
Peder Munk was the son of Ludvig Munk (d. 1537) and Kirstin Pedersdatte Lykke. He was born at Lønborggård, Lønborg, Ringkøbing, Denmark, on 22 April 1534. Peder's younger brother Ludvig Munk was also a sailor and a soldier, whose daughter Kirsten Munk married Christian IV of Denmark in 1615.

Peder Munk's main estate from 1566 was Estvadgård in Skive Kommune.

In 1575, Peder Munk was made Admiral of Denmark, the Admiral of the Realm or 'Rigsadmiral'; in 1588, he was made one of the council, the Rigsraadet of regents for Christian IV. Peder Munk is said to have provided a miniature warship for the young king in a Jutland lake.

On 20 August 1589, Peder Munk and others accepted an agreement at Helsingør over the rule of the islands Orkney from the Scottish ambassador George Keith, 5th Earl Marischal, as part of the marriage arrangements of James VI of Scotland and Anne of Denmark, a sister of Christian IV.

== Mission to Scotland ==
In August 1589, the Danish council decided that Peder Munk, Breide Rantzau, Dr Paul Knibbe, and Niels Krag would accompany Anne of Denmark, the bride of James VI, to Scotland. Peder sailed on 5 September with Henrik Knudsen Gyldenstierne, admiral of the fleet, and 18 ships. Munk and Henrik Gildenstern sailed with a Danish fleet including the Gideon, Josaphad or Josafat their flagship, Samson, Joshua, Dragon, Raphael, St Michael, Gabriel, Little Sertoun (Lille Fortuna), Mouse, Rose, the Falcon of Birren, the Blue Lion, the Blue Dove (Blaa Due) and the White Dove (Hvide Due).

=== Winter in Norway ===
There were two accidents on the ships at Copenhagen involving exploding cannons. The fleet was delayed by adverse and contrary winds. They first stopped at a safe haven in Norway, "Gamel Sellohe", where the leaking Gideon was repaired, then at Flekkerøy. The Samson, St Michael, and the Joshua returned to Copenhagen.

In Scotland, James waited for his bride at Seton Palace in East Lothian. He worked up his feelings into a sonnet, A complaint against the contrary wyndes that hindered the Queene to com to Scotland from Denmarke. A ferry boat on the Forth collided with another vessel in a storm drowning all its passengers, including Jane Kennedy who was to join the queen's household. There was an inquiry and trial about this incident, but later in 1590 this disaster and the accidents of the royal voyages were attributed to witchcraft.

James VI sent the Scottish diplomat William Stewart with John Skene and Peter Young to Anna in Norway. They sailed from Flekkerøy to Copenhagen and told Henrik Ramel (Ramelius) of the predicament facing the Danish fleet. At Helsingør, Jørgen Rosenkrantz and Christoffer Valkendorf asked for the Regent's and Council's advice, and wrote to Anna of Denmark asking if she would return to Denmark, but they realised the Scottish envoys and George Keith, 5th Earl Marischal wanted her to continue her journey or stay at Oslo. Meanwhile, Steen Bille, William Stewart, and Andrew Sinclair brought Anna's letters in French from Flekkerøy to Edinburgh on 10 October, describing the delay and four or five failed attempts to cross the North Sea, and saying she would stay in Norway. James VI decided to sail to Norway and escort her back to Denmark.

=== Scotland and the queen's dower lands ===
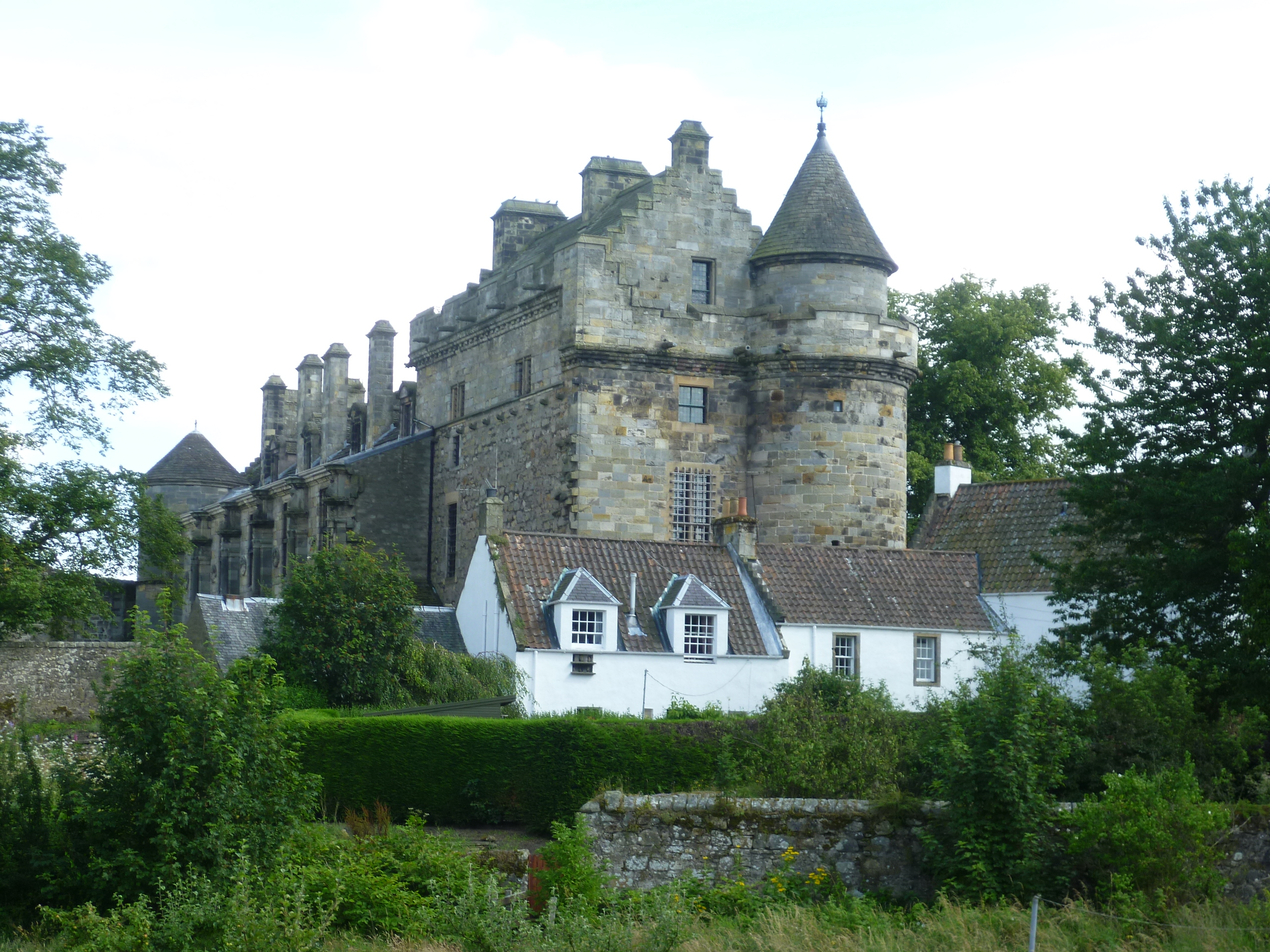
Peder Munk was welcomed at Falkland Palace by James Beaton of Creich and given a handful of earth and stones.

James VI and Anne of Denmark returned to Scotland on 1 May 1590 with the remainder of the Danish fleet. Munk, Breide Rantzau, and Steen Brahe came as ambassadors. On their arrival at Leith, James VI presented the skipper of Munk's ship, the pilots, trumpeters, violers and kettle drummers with forty gold rose noble coins, accounted from his dowry. Peder Munk was given a jewel.

Before Anne's coronation in Edinburgh, Peder Munk travelled to view and take formal possession of the lands which James VI had given Anne of Denmark as a "morning gift". This gift was confirmed by the presentation of a special charter with the royal seal and the seals of representatives of the Parliament of Scotland and the Scottish burgh towns. Munk went first to Rossend Castle the home of Sir Robert Melville, and stayed at Wemyss Castle. On 12 May they visited Falkland Palace, then his party stayed the night with the Earl of Morton at the Newhouse of Lochleven Castle. Next, on 13 May, they went to Dunfermline Palace and then after a night at Niddry Castle, on 14 May, Linlithgow Palace. At each palace, the lawyer John Skene read out the details of the property, then Munk was given a handful of earth and stone, the traditional Scottish ceremony of transferring ownership or "sasine".

Back in Edinburgh, on 17 May, the day of the queen's coronation, Munk, Steen Brahe, and Breide Rantzau walked with Anne of Denmark down the aisle of Holyrood Abbey on her left side, and the English ambassador Sir Robert Bowes walked on the right. They were followed by Bowes's wife Eleanor Musgrove, the Countess of Mar, Margaret Douglas, Countess of Bothwell, and Jean Kennedy Countess of Orkney who carried the train of the queen's gown and cloak.

On 18 May, Munk and Lord Hamilton escorted Anne of Denmark into St Giles during the ceremony of her entry into the town. The town of Edinburgh held a banquet a few days later for the Danish envoys and the king and queen. It was held in the house of the master of the mint, Thomas Aitchisoun, at the foot of Todrick's Wynd. The organiser was John MacMorran who had the room hung with tapestry, hired musicians, and arranged a guard of honour carrying halberds. The goldsmith Thomas Foulis provided gold chains as diplomatic gifts for Munk and the other Danish envoys.

=== Witch trials ===
After his return to Denmark, Peder Munk became involved in litigation with Christoffer Valkendorff, treasurer and governor or Stadtholder of Copenhagen, about equipping the fleet and defective ships in October 1589. Some women were accused of witchcraft in the Copenhagen witch trials, raising storms or sabotaging the ships intended to carry Anne to Scotland. Anna Koldings and others were executed for gathering in Karen Vævers's house to infest the keels of the ships with little devils, Pil-Hesteskou and Smuk (Arrow-Horseshoe and Pretty), smuggled onto the ships in barrels.

News of the arrest of five or six women in Copenhagen reached Edinburgh by 23 July 1590. The English ambassador Robert Bowes wrote, "It is advertised from Denmark, that the Admiral there has caused five or six witches to be taken in Copenhagen, upon suspicion that by their witchcraft they had stayed the Queen of Scots voyage into Scotland, and sought to have stayed likewise the King's return."

In October 1590, the Danish diplomat Dr Paul Knibbe or Knibius wrote to Daniel Rogers in London that Peder Munk's fleet had been threatened by witches led by Margrete the wife of Jakob Skiber, consul in Copenhagen. Munk accompanied the accused couple to their trial and sentencing. Margrete was burnt and the possessions of Jakob were confiscated.

In Scotland, several people were accused of trying to sink the royal ships by magic in the North Berwick witch trials. The "articles of dittay" indicting Agnes Sampson of witchcraft include raising winds to prevent the queen sailing to Scotland. The safe delivery of James VI and Anne of Denmark from the "conspiracy of witches" was celebrated at the baptism of their son Prince Henry at Stirling Castle in August 1594.

=== Scotland in August 1591 ===
The "Admiral of Denmark" is said to have returned to Scotland as ambassador in August 1591 with a train of 200 followers. He spoke to James VI about the disagreements between Anne of Denmark and the Chancellor John Maitland of Thirlestane.

== Marshal of Denmark ==
On 29 July 1590, Munk was with Christian IV and his mother Sophie of Mecklenburg-Güstrow in the palace of Koldinghus at Kolding. They entertained the Scottish ambassadors John Skene and William Stewart. At dinner the ambassadors were seated at one table with the king, Munk, Peder Gyldenstierne, Steen Brahe, Hak Holgersen Ulfstand, Henrik Below, and Breide Rantzau, which was a special honour for the diplomats.

From 1596 to 1608, he was Marshal of the Realm or Rigsmarsk, the commander of Danish armed forces, in succession to Hak Holgersen Ulfstand (1535-1594).

He married Karen Skeel (d. 1601) in 1566, a daughter of Albert Skeel and Kirsten Sandberg. Their heraldry, dated 1568, is represented in a carving at Borre kirke, on the island of Møn.

On 29 July 1604, he married Sophie Pedersdatter Brahe (1580-1638), a daughter of Peder Jensson Brahe (d. 1610) and Margarete Albretsdatter Gøye (d. 1594).

Peder Munk came to England in the retinue of Christian IV and King James gave him a gift of gilt plate on 11 August 1606.

From 1589, Munk owned the manor at Sæbygård at Volstrup Sogn. The house had been built for the previous owners by Hercules (or Claus) Midow. In 1621 Munk sold Estvadgård to Johan Rantzau.

Peder Munk died in 1623 at Sødringholm, Udbyhøj, a manor that he had bought in 1592, and was buried on 31 March at Volstrup Church.

His widow Sophie Brahe sold Sødringholm to Gert Rantzau (1558-1627) in 1625 and made her home at Sæbygård, where she had the east wing rebuilt. Their daughter, Kirsten Munk (1608-1624), and Sophie were also buried at Volstrup.

Munk had a house in Copenhagen in the Admiralgade. In 1607, Anna Busch Walker, who claimed to be a prophet, made an illustrated manuscript and presented it to Anne of Denmark. She wrote that she was the daughter of George Busch, born in Copenhagen, upon the Holm in "Peter Munckss" house, now "ritsch amirall" in Denmark. The Holm, Holmen, or Bremerholm was a former island reclaimed to make a naval base.
