= Vittsjö =

Coordinates: 56°21′N 13°39′E

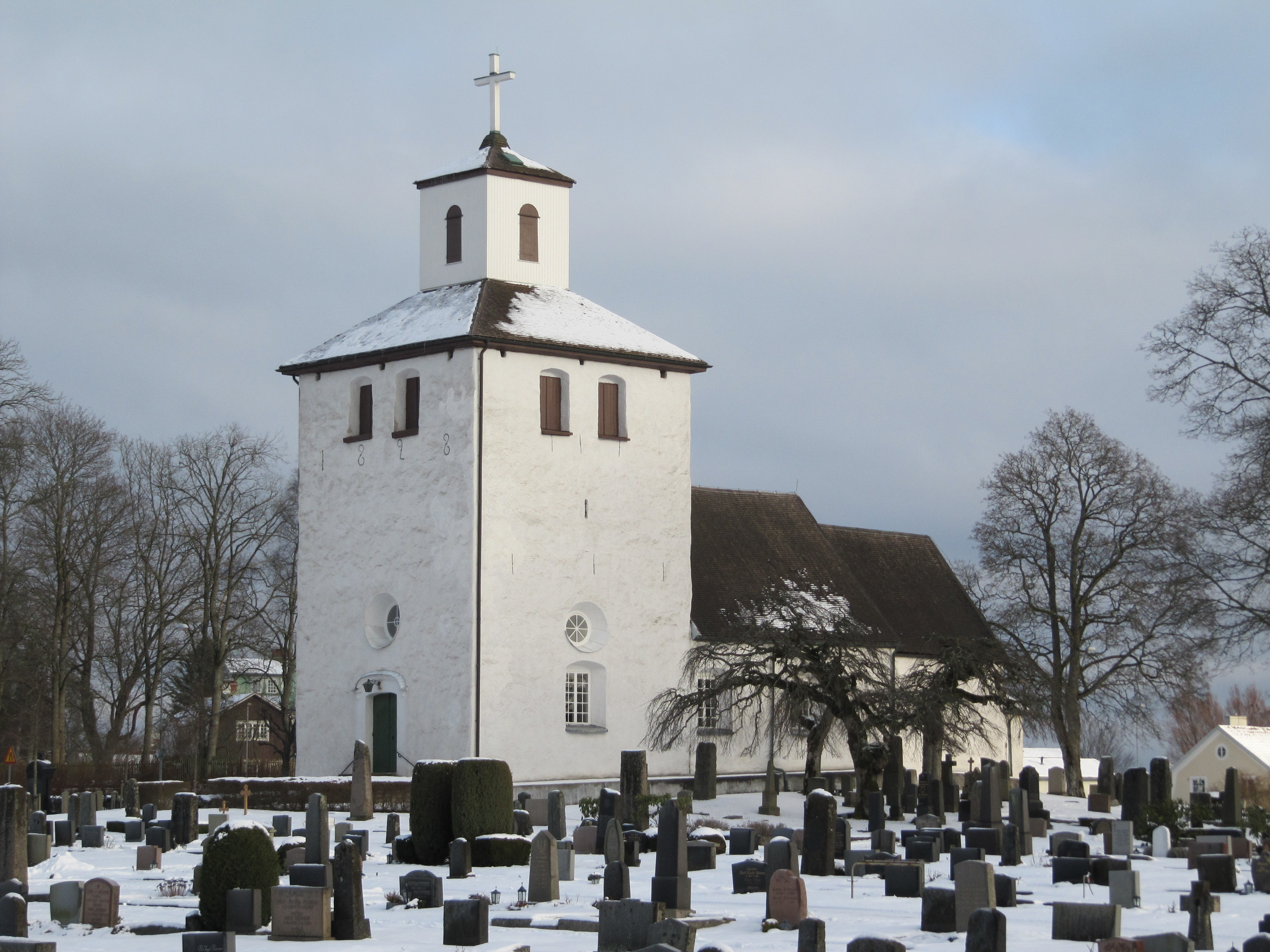
- Vittsjö Church

- Location within Skåne Location within Sweden
- Country: Sweden
- Province: Scania
- County: Scania County
- Municipality: Hässleholm Municipality

Area
  - Total: 2.65 km^{2} (1.02 sq mi)

Population (31 December 2010)
  - Total: 1,665
  - Density: 628/km^{2} (1,630/sq mi)
- Time zone: UTC+1 (CET)
  - Summer (DST): UTC+2 (CEST)

Vittsjö (Swedish: [ˈvɪtːˌɧøː]) is a locality situated in Hässleholm Municipality, Scania County, Sweden with 1,665 inhabitants in 2010.

== History ==
During the Kalmar War, Vittsjö was the site of the 1612 Battle of Vittsjö, where recently crowned Swedish King Gustavus Adolphus nearly drowned while retreating from Danish forces.

Vittsjö municipality, located in Western District Göinge, then Kristianstad län, was extended in 1952 through the merger with Verum and Visseltofta municipalities.

== Geography ==
Vittsjö has an altitude of 1,204 feet (367 meters). Nearby towns are Hässleholm, Markaryd, Osby and Kristianstad.

The city itself has a rail line running through as well as a major highway, Route 117. The area is ideal for canoeing due to its major lake Vittsjön.

== Commerce ==
The first houses in the town were built around the railroad station which was built in the 1860s. As a result, manufacturing industries settled in the area.

The construction of Öresund Bridge and Sweden's EU membership made Skåne an ideal center of commerce. Hässleholm offered highly competitive land prices convenienently located to Malmö and Copenhagen, making it appealing for industry to settle there.

One fifth of all employment is within the manufacturing industry, with the emphasis on wood and metal. Other popular employment consists of public administration, commerce, private services, the construction industry, transport and farming and forestry.

Today, Vittsjö hosts six of the largest companies in Sweden. The city is ranked among Europe's largest cities ordered by their number of companies Vittsjö is on position 6175.

Companies located in the city are Wiwood AB, Wiwood Cutting AB, Emmaljunga Barnvagnsfabrik AB, Grus & Makadam AB, Emmaljunga Torvmull AB, and Emmaljunga Torv Försäljnings AB.

== Sport ==
The women's football club Vittsjö GIK is based in the town. The club plays in the Damallsvenskan, the highest level of women's football in Sweden.

== Famous people from Vittsjö ==
- Freddie Ljungberg, footballer born in Vittsjö but grew up in Halmstad
- Nilla Fischer, footballer
- Gustav Fridolin, Co-spokesperson of the Swedish Green Party
- Peps Persson, blues and reggae musician
- KG Hammar, former archbishop
