= Heinrich Rantzau =

German humanist, astrologer, and author

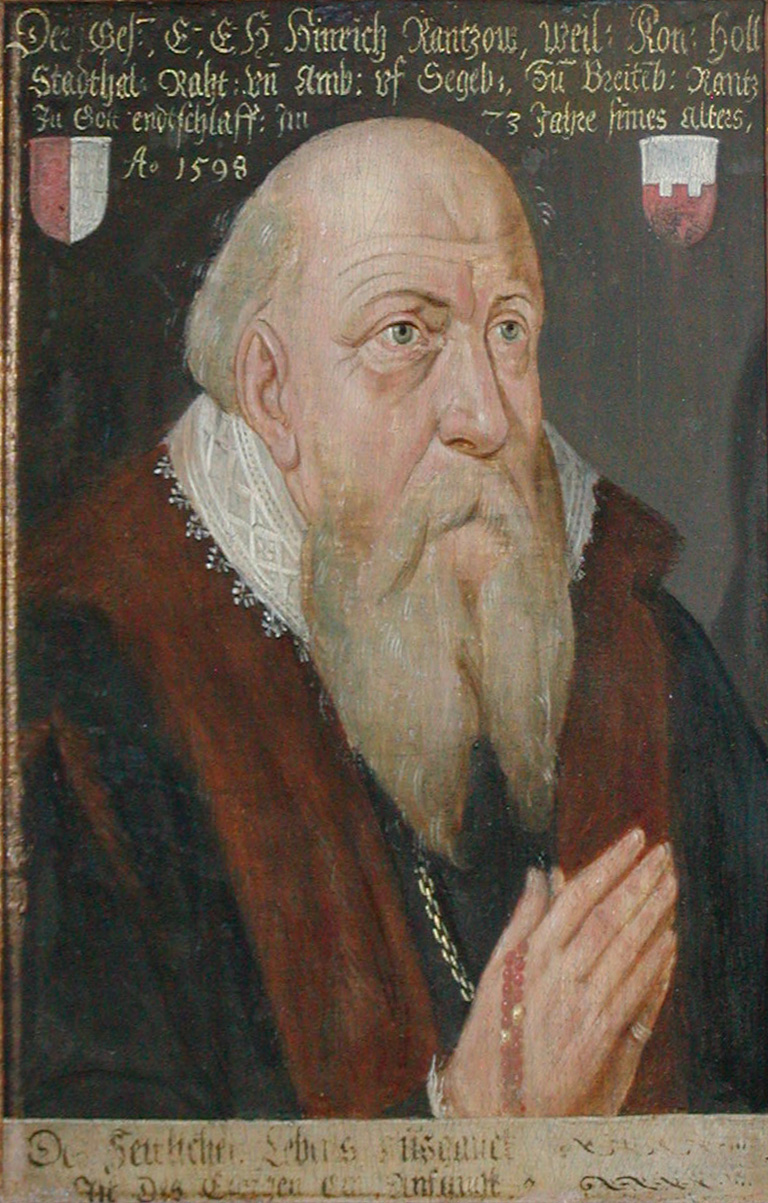
Rantzau

Heinrich Rantzau or Ranzow (Ranzovius) (11 March 1526 – 31 December 1598) was a German humanist writer and statesman, a prolific astrologer and an associate of Tycho Brahe. He was son of Johan Rantzau. He was Governor of the Danish royal share in the Duchy of Holstein, a rich man and celebrated book collector. Rantzau is perhaps best remembered as a patron of scholars. His own Tractatus astrologicus de genethliacorum thematum appeared in 1593, and went through five editions by 1615. In his own time, he was regarded as a generous supporter of artists and writers in Lübeck, many of whom he engaged to write memorials of his father. Rantzau was also a successful merchant with trading interests in the east–west trade through Husum and Lübeck.

Rantzau was awarded the Danish Order of the Elephant in 1580 by King Frederick II of Denmark.

His oldest son Breide Rantzau was a councillor of the Danish realm, and a younger son, Gert Rantzau, was Captain of the castles of Kronborg and Flensburg.

He was the great-uncle of Josias von Rantzau, Marshal of France.

== Editions ==
- Felgentreu, Fritz (ed., trans.). Heinrich Rantzau (Christianus Cilicius Cimber). Belli Dithmarsici vera descriptio: Wahre Beschreibung des Dithmarscher Krieges (Schleswig: Landesarchiv Schleswig-Holstein, 2009) (Veröffentlichungen des Landesarchivs Schleswig-Holstein, 86).
