= Battle of Vittsjö =

Battle in 1612 between Sweden and Denmark-Norway

- Part of the Kalmar War
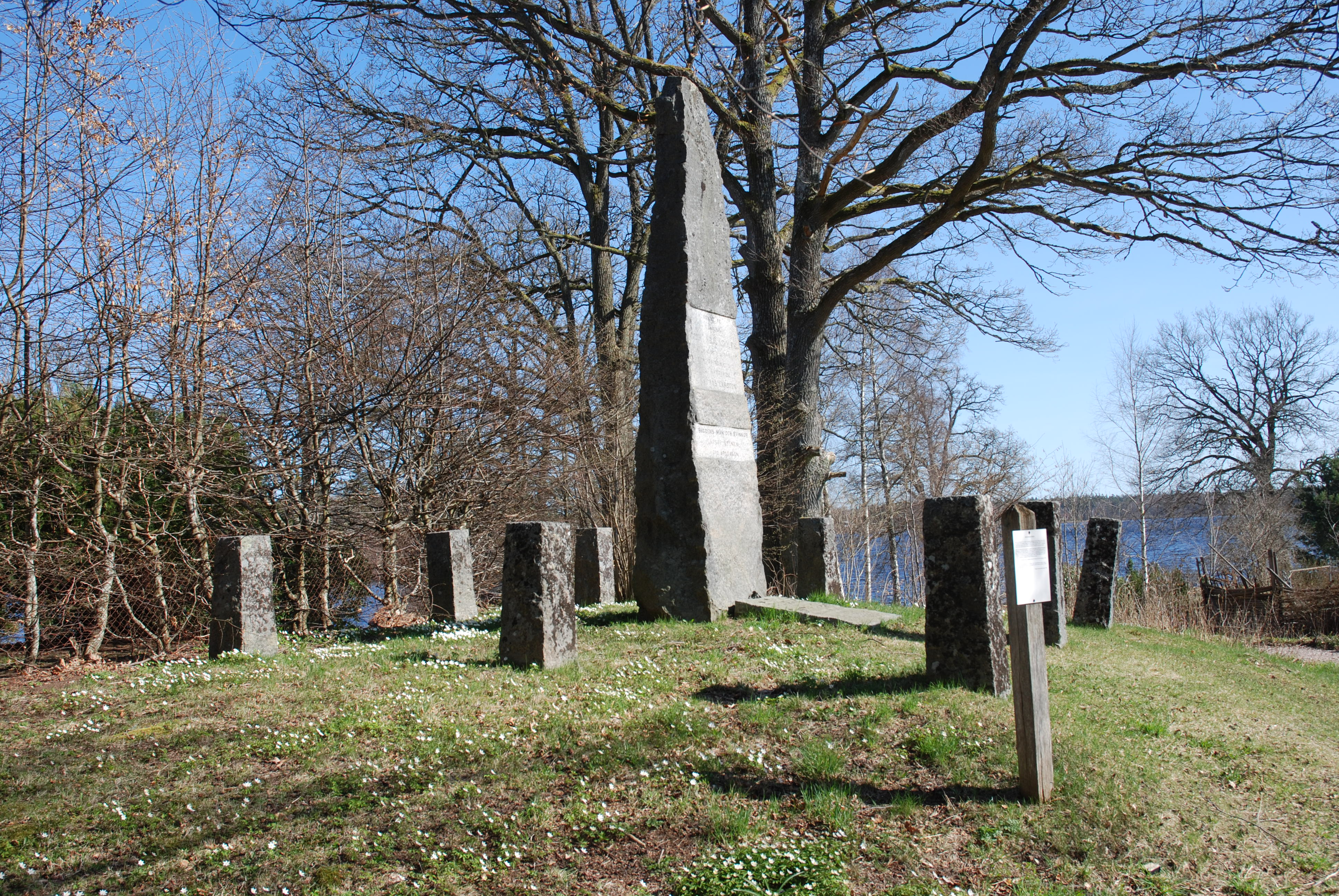
- Monument, Battle of Vittsjö, raised February 11, 1912
Date	11 February 1612
Location	Vittsjö, at the time part of Denmark 56°21′N 13°39′E
Result	Danish victory

Belligerents
(yes) Swedish Empire	Denmark–Norway

Commanders and leaders
(Swedish Empire) Gustavus Adolphus	(Denmark–Norway) Breide Rantzau

Strength
3,000	Over 3,000

Casualties and losses
300–1,400	Unknown

The Battle of Vittsjö was a battle between a Swedish force under Gustavus Adolphus and a Dano-Norwegian force under Breide Rantzau that took place in 1612; it was more a case of the Swedes retreating from the Danes than a full-scale battle.

== Background ==
Gustavus Adolphus, who in December 1611, at the age of 17, had ascended the throne of Sweden, was in the winter of 1612 on the rampage in Skåne in retaliation for the Danish ravaging of Småland and Västergötland during the Kalmar War. He and his army, which consisted of about 3,000 men, led by Nils Stiernsköld, Herman Wrangel, and others, had burned the city of Vä and 24 parishes within Göinge and Villands district.

== Battle ==
On the night of 10–11 February 1612 the king and a small force were in Vittsjö. In the morning, the Danes attacked and the king and his entourage fled north past Vittsjö sconce towards Dragsån (now Verumsån or Vieån). The bridge over the river was held by Danes so the king was forced to try to cross by riding over the ice. The ice broke and the king and his horse fell into the water. The king (but not his horse) was rescued by the horsemen Thomas Larsson and Per Banér, who himself got into the water and was rescued by his younger brother Nils Banér.

== In memory ==
In 1912 a memorial was raised to commemorate the battle. The inscription on the memorial reads in full:

"Minne af konung Gustaf II Adolfs räddning i Wittsjö den 11 februari 1612 af ryttaren Thomas Larsson" (in English "Memory of King Gustavus Adolphus' rescue in Wittsjö February 11, 1612 by the horseman Thomas Larsson")

Those who died in the action were buried in a mass grave. It was long forgotten but was recovered as a result of the digging of a trench in 1959 not more than 100 meters from the previously-raised memorial stone.

== Sources ==
- Slaget i Vittsjö 1612. Author Ebbe Persson
- Kriget mot Danmark. Author Stefan Zenker
