= Paul Knibbe =

Flemish-born lawyer and diplomat in Danish service

Paul Knibbe or Paulus Knibius or Knibbius (d. 1592) was a Flemish-born lawyer and diplomat in the service of Denmark-Norway employed in England and Scotland.

== Early career ==
Paul Knibbe was born in Tielt in West Flanders.

Knibbe had a doctorate and had taught at Heidelberg university.

Knibbe and the English diplomat Robert Beale went together to the Calvinist Frankfurt Conference in September 1577 and to the Electors of Saxony and Brandenburg. In September 1578 William of Orange sent him as his representative to Ghent. In 1581 Knibbe joined the council of William of Orange in Flanders.

Knibbe owned a manuscript of the works of Geoffrey of Monmouth and William of Malmesbury which he gave to his friend at Heidelberg Jerome Commelin for publication in 1587. Knibbe studied and recorded Roman inscriptions, apparently including those in Scotland, corresponding with the French antiquary Jean-Jacques Boissard. This interest in Roman inscriptions was shared by the Scottish ambassador George Keith, 5th Earl Marischal, who placed stones from the Antonine Wall in his castle at Dunnottar. Marischal came to Denmark in 1589 to conclude the marriage of Anne of Denmark and James VI.

Knibbe wrote from Vlissingen to the English diplomat Daniel Rogers in March 1587. Rogers had sent him a book of Cecil's reasons for the execution of Mary, Queen of Scots, which Knibbe had already seen in a Dutch translation. He discussed plans for peace with Spain, and the departure of the Earl of Leicester from the Netherlands. Soon after, Knibbe joined the service of the Danish monarchy.

== Danish service ==
On 5 September 1589 Anne of Denmark set out for Scotland to join her husband James VI. Her company included the Admiral Peder Munk, Breide Rantzau, Knibbe, and Niels Krag. Facing adverse weather and 'contrary winds' the fleet stopped at Flekkerøy near Oslo. Knibbe returned to Copenhagen.

When James VI came to Oslo to meet his bride in November 1589, the Danish council and his mother-in-law Sophie of Mecklenburg-Güstrow sent Knibbe, Corfitz Tønnesen Viffert, and Georg Brahe to greet him and invite him to Copenhagen.

On 26 July 1590 a Scottish embassy including John Skene, Colonel William Stewart, and John Geddie came to Koldinghus and were welcomed by "Dr Paul Knibius". He gave them their letters for James VI when they left.

He maintained a correspondence with the English diplomats Francis Walsingham and Daniel Rogers. In October 1590 Knibbe wrote to Daniel Rogers in London describing ongoing witch trials. Peder Munk's fleet in November 1589 had been threatened by witches led by Margrete the wife of Jakob Skiber, consul in Copenhagen. She was burnt as a witch.

Knibbe arrived in Scotland on 10 July 1591 and came to James VI and Anne of Denmark at Falkland Palace on 18 July. He discussed issues arising from the proposals made by Skene and Colonel Stewart for a peace treaty involving Spain. He brought letters from the Duke of Brunswick written in German, though James VI preferred Latin. Knibbe was instructed to enquire if Anne had been installed in her jointure properties. He brought a letter to the Chancellor of Scotland, John Maitland of Thirlestane asking for his help in this (Maitland owned some of the lands in question). Knibbe had a discussion with Robert Bowes the English diplomat in Edinburgh.

In his company were some Danish gentlemen who escorted a Danish gentlewoman to join the household of Anne of Denmark, who was probably Margaret Vinstarr. They were to bring two gentlewomen home, probably Anne or Sophia Kaas and Katheren Skinkel.

Knibbe was sent as ambassador to England in 1592. He went to Oxford to meet Queen Elizabeth but she was away on her progress. When an audience was arranged, Knibbe fainted when he was helped into a carriage.

He died in London on 5 October 1592.

Christian IV wrote to Queen Elizabeth in June 1593 to request she send his effects to his widow.

== Family ==
His wife Anne was a daughter of Adolf van Meetkercke, President of Flanders, his mother-in-law was Marguerite van Lichtervelde. The historian Emanuel van Meteren mentioned his death in a letter to Abraham Ortelius, and that he left five children.
