= Assault on Gullberg Castle =

Failed Danish attack on Gullberg

Coordinates: 57°42′51″N 11°59′22″E

- Part of the Kalmar War
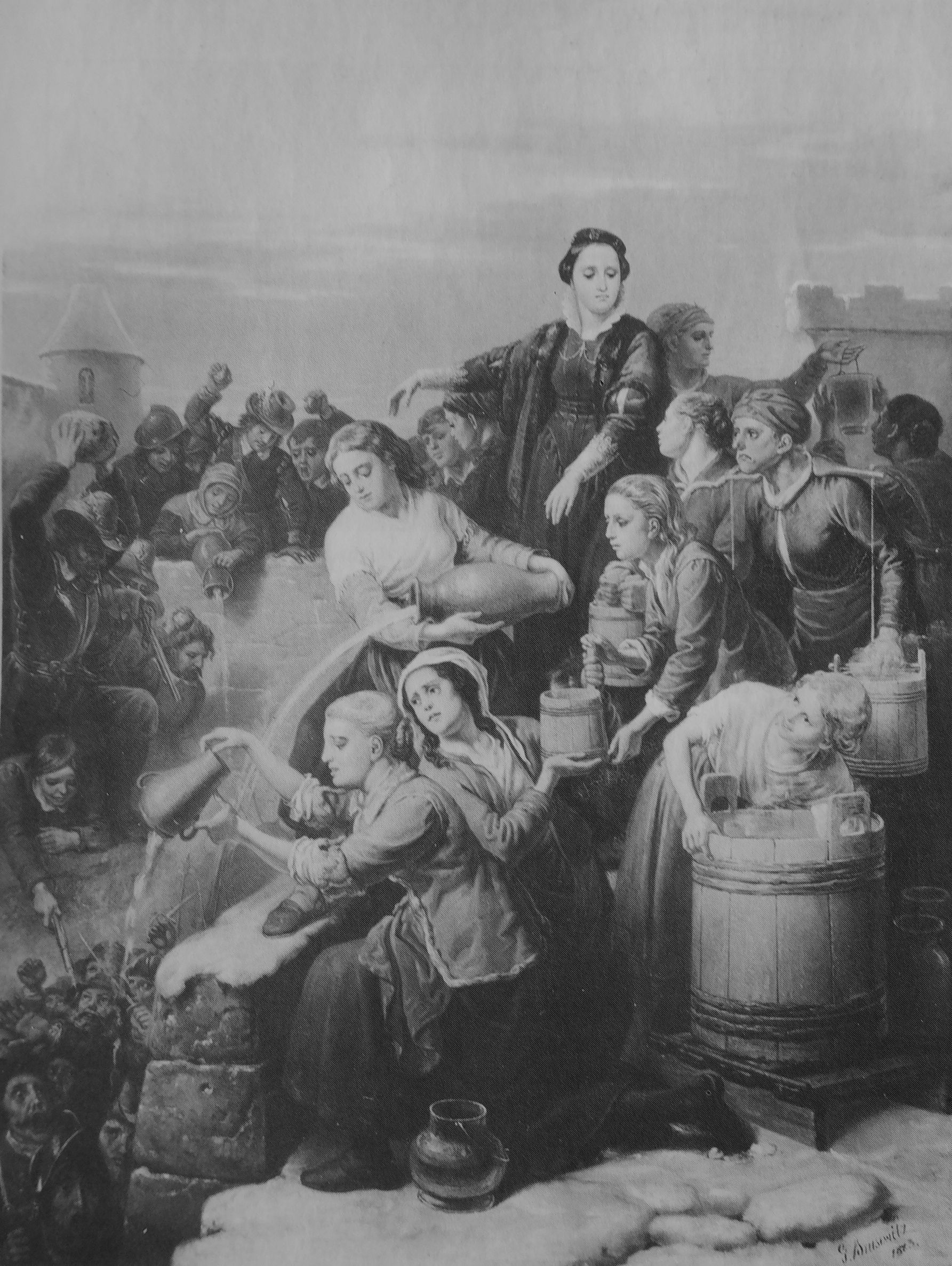
- National Romantic depiction of the Siege of Gullberg, showing Emerentia Pauli (Krakow) leading the women in the defense, pouring boiling lye on the attacking Danes by Gustaf Brusewitz
Date	26 January 1612
Location	Gullberg Castle
Result	Swedish victory
Territorial changes	Danish withdrawal from Gullberg

Belligerents
(yes) Swedish Empire	Denmark–Norway

Commanders and leaders
(Swedish Empire) Emerentia Krakow (Swedish Empire) Mårten Krakow (WIA)	(Denmark–Norway) Christian IV

Units involved
(Swedish Empire) Gullberg garrison	(Denmark–Norway) 5 cavalry companies (Denmark–Norway) Duke George's regiment (Denmark–Norway) King's Regiment

Strength
300 men & women 2 guns	2,500 men

Casualties and losses
Unknown	150–200 casualties

The Assault on Gullberg Castle (Swedish: Anfallet mot Gullbergs fästning; Danish: Angreb på Gullberg Slot) occurred on 26 January 1612 during the Kalmar War. The female commander of the fortress, Emerentia Krakow, successfully led the Swedish defense after her husband, Mårten Krakow, broke his leg after falling off his horse.

== Background ==
On 15 January, Christian IV marched into Halland with some companies of infantry as reinforcements. There he received a letter from the Swedish Council of the Realm, offering to negotiate peace as long as he agreed to return Kalmar and his other conquests in Sweden. The proposal annoyed Christian to such a point to where he later wrote to Gustavus Adolphus that the proposal itself necessitated a resumption of war. Additionally, he sent a raiding party consisting of the Ribe Banner under Lieutenant Knud Gyldenstjerne into south-west Småland.

Meanwhile, the main Danish army assembled at Varberg, and by 21 January, it consisted of five national cavalry units, Duke George of Brunswick–Lüneburg's harquebusier cavalry company, parts of Duke George's regiment, which was five companies, under the Duke, Ernst von Botner, Anthonius Freudenmann, Adam von Köten, and Marquard Rantzau respectively. Along with this, it also consisted of the King's regiment, which consisted of a newly raised Life Company under Thomas Nold and a company under Mathias Kochheim.

The total strength of the army is estimated at some 2,500 men, and by then, Danish raiding parties had already entered Swedish territory.

=== Prelude ===
On 25 January, Christian IV led the Danish army on a forced march of 80 kilometers to Gullberg Castle, as it was the closest fortress on the Göta River to them, and Christian hoped to conquer the castle by surprise.

Gullberg Castle was a small castle on a tall cliff that controlled the main road from Älvsborg Castle to Halland, and its construction had begun in 1568 as a replacement for an older medieval castle. It was relatively small, only having two block houses surrounded by walls, but it was modern. John III had built it in order to secure Nya Lödöse, and it had been upgraded again in the early 1600s, right before the start of the Kalmar War around 1607.

== Assault ==
On 26 January, at 2:00 a.m., the Danes reached Gullberg Castle. Even though a sudden thaw made the streams hard to cross, Christian immediately ordered his troops to attempt a storming of the castle. Having no siege artillery, and most likely no infantry at this point, they tried to rely on the moment of surprise. In a sudden night attack, the Danes first bombarded the castle with "lead, stones, and iron pieces", and Julien Grandfond, a French petardier, managed to blow the castle's outer gate. However, the some 300 defenders had reinforced the entrance, thus, even with the outer gate blown open, the Danes were not able to penetrate in force, however, a few Danes were able to enter the castle's cookhouse. The Duke of Lüneburg's troops put up ladders against the walls, but the defenders dropped large beams from the walls and cleared the outside. The ladders fell and the soldiers were crushed alive, and to Christian's annoyance, those who survived pulled back.

When the Danes tried to enter, they were met by a barricade which had been built by the Swedes, and while they were repelled by the barricade, they were bombarded by two cannons which had been pulled up on a nearby roof which Emerentia loaded with iron shot and old horseshoes. However, she did not satisfy herself with only this, she had, together with the wives of the Swedish knights, make large amounts of boiling lye, which the women poured over the attacking Danes, so that they:

lay in the archway and around the gate like scalded pigs.

However, some thirty Danes, who were captured, managed to avoid the cannonfire, rushing into the "borgstuga" where women were sitting with their children. The Danes asked for food from the women, but nobody had time for them. Most of the women instead went out to the field to help the defense, and were aware of what would happen to them if the Danes managed to capture the castle.

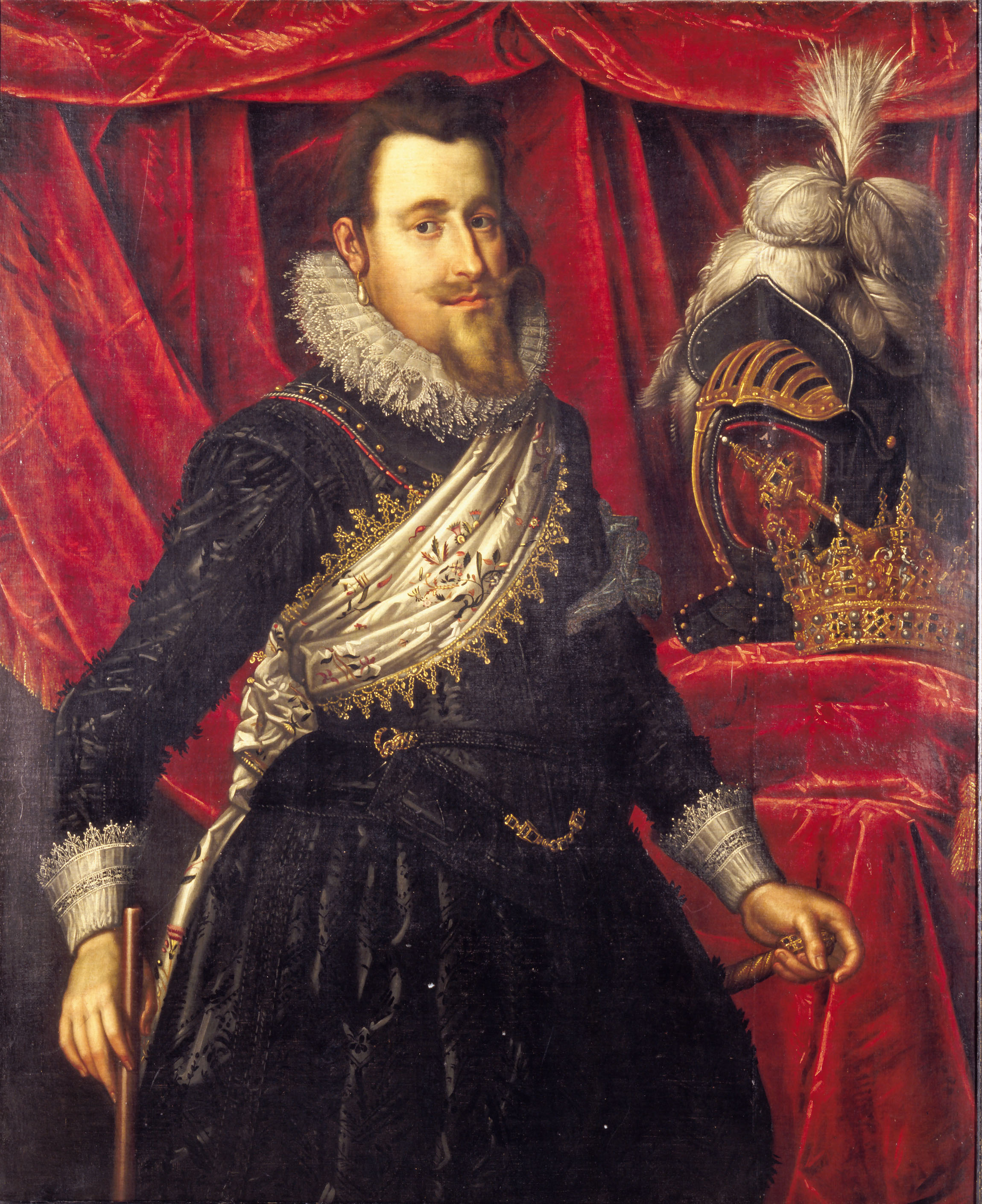
Portrait of Christian IV by Pieter Isaacsz from 1612

During the fighting, Mårten Krakow, the commander of Gullberg, accidentally fell off his horse, breaking his left leg and an arm, putting him out of combat. However, his wife, Emerentia Pauli (Krakow), assumed command of the Swedish defense, bringing the women living in the castle into battle. Under her command, Krakow's men, aided by their women, killed the Danes who had entered and repulsed five storming attempts in six hours, with Danish casualties being estimated as between 150 and 200 men.

When Emerentia entered the borgstuga, she found the thirty captured Danes, who complained that they had not received any food during their imprisonment. She subsequently promised them food and called them out one by one, where they were shot by soldiers standing outside, killing them.

After the continued attacks, the Swedes had begun running out of gunpowder, which was certainly stored in the gunpowder magazine, but it was locked and the key was guarded by Lieutenant Sven in Ramaklev. Sven, in terms of courage, was the complete opposite of Emerentia, and thus, he had hidden himself with the key in his pocket in what the chronicle describes as a "disgraceful place". However, Emerentia did not lose courage, and she had the door to the magazine broken open, and personally sought out Sven in his hiding place and scolded him.

The Danes continued their relentless attack throughout the night, however, by seven o'clock in the morning, they had failed to capture Gullberg, Christian sent a messenger to Emerentia, asking for a ceasefire so he could retrieve the dead Danes in the castle in order to bury them. However, probably suspecting a ruse, Emerentia responded:

If God had granted the Swedes the luck to kill them, they could also take care of the burial!

She also added that the Danes had shown up at her gate without warning, and if they cared to return for dinner, she would prepare a better meal for them. Thus, realizing Gullberg was too difficult to capture, Christian abandoned the assault. When Emerentia went out to the field, she spotted a cavalryman on a white horse, and quickly ordered the Swedes to fire on him. The cavalryman turned out to be the Danish king, who was doing reconnaissance, however, only the horse was hit. Other sources claim it was an överste, and when the blood from the horse came onto Christian, he most likely exclaimed:

The devil take Kråken (Kakow), he sleeps not, this was destined for me!

== Aftermath ==
After the failed assault, Christian moved towards Älvsborg, aiming to destroy the six Swedish warships stationed there for the winter, as they were stationary, frozen into the ice and vulnerable.

=== Reliability ===
The credibility of the story of Emerentia Krakow's defense has been put into question and is debated. What is myth and truth in the story of the fighting is unknown, all that is known completely is that the Danes failed to capture the fortress.

== Works cited ==
- Isacson, Claes-Göran (2006). Vägen till stormakt : Vasaättens krig [The road to great power: The wars of the Vasa dynasty] (in Swedish). Norstedts. ISBN 9789113015026.
- Essen, Michael Fredholm von (9 August 2023). The Kalmar War 1611-1613: Gustavus Adolphus's First War. Helion & Company. ISBN 9781804510063.
- Peterson, Martin (2015). Stormaktstidens soldater i krig: Från nordiska sjuårskriget till trettioåriga kriget [Great Powers' Soldiers at War: From the Nordic Seven Years' War to the Thirty Years' War] (in Swedish). Vol. 1. Svenskt militärhistoriskt bibliotek. ISBN 9789186837891.
