= Daniel Rogers (diplomat) =

Anglo-Flemish diplomat and politician

Daniel Rogers (1538?–1591) was an Anglo-Flemish diplomat and politician, known as a well-connected humanist poet and historian.

== Early life ==
The eldest son of John Rogers and his wife Adriana van der Weyden of Antwerp, he was born at Wittenberg about 1538. John Rogers the civilian was a brother, and went on some diplomatic missions with him. On his mother's side Rogers was related to Emanuel van Meteren and Abraham Ortelius.

Rogers came to England with his family in 1548, and was naturalised with them in 1552. After his father's death in 1555 he returned to Wittenberg, and studied under Philip Melanchthon. He was taught also by Hubert Languet and Johannes Sturm. He returned to England on Elizabeth I's accession, and graduated B.A. at Oxford in August 1561. Nicasius Yetswiert, Elizabeth's secretary of the French tongue, who had known his father, and whose daughter Susan Rogers afterwards married, introduced him to court.

Rogers was then in Paris for nine years, with a break in Antwerp in 1565, and came under the influences of Petrus Ramus, and the contemporary eirenicism. He may have worked in some capacity in Paris for Sir Thomas Hoby; he was employed as a tutor by Sir Henry Norris, the next English ambassador in Paris, between 1566 and 1570, and sent home intelligence to Secretary William Cecil. After that Francis Walsingham took over as ambassador there.

== Dutch and German diplomacy ==
In 1572 Rogers was in Ireland, acting as a guide to German aristocratic visitors. In October 1574 Rogers went with Sir William Winter to Antwerp, and he accompanied a major embassy to the Netherlands, to treat with William the Silent, in June 1575. Thomas Wilson the diplomat was a friend, and Rogers wrote epigrams for him; Wilson took on Rogers as a secretary by the end of 1574.

Rogers, Wilson and Walsingham were in effect Elizabeth's staff for the Anglo-Dutch alliance, given final form by the Treaty of Nonsuch in 1585. Rogers has been called "the key figure in many diplomatic Anglo-Dutch exchanges". By 1575 he had fresh status as secretary to the Merchant Adventurers, and was a diplomat receiving personal instructions. As was the case for his friend and colleague Robert Beale, but even more so, the circle of humanist contacts Rogers built up was also a network that facilitated diplomatic contact. Identified as a Philippist (a former student of Melanchthon), Rogers would have been exposed to a Protestant view of international politics that was providentialist, strongly opposed to the Papacy, and intended to combat the Council of Trent.

Rogers was engaged in diplomatic business in the Low Countries throughout 1576, and in March 1577 was there again to negotiate the terms on which Queen Elizabeth was to lend £20,000 to the States-General. In the same month he was in Frankfurt with Sir Philip Sidney, a mission on a new front designed to tackle the theological splits that were hampering Protestant diplomacy in Germany. Rogers started to shuttle across the North Sea in support of an ambitious Protestant League. Dutch business occupied him till March 1578. At this period Philips of Marnix, Lord of Saint-Aldegonde deciphered intercepted Spanish correspondence dealing with an invasion of England. Rogers passed it on to Walsingham.

Discussions with William in July 1577 gave Rogers some perspective on the German issue. The suggestion was that Frederik II of Denmark might act as honest broker. William considered that Frederik's close relationship with Augustus, Elector of Saxony offered some hope. In early 1579 Rogers was sent by Robert Dudley, 1st Earl of Leicester to reconcile John Casimir of the Palatinate-Simmern, a friend, and William, who had fallen out over the Calvinists of Ghent.

The publication of the Book of Concord in the middle of 1580 in fact aggravated the difficulties. In September 1580 Rogers was sent to Augustus of Saxony, in an effort to calm the dissensions among Lutherans. Beale was sent to contact a dozen German courts, too, in a drive to counter the troubles over Crypto-Calvinism.

== In captivity ==
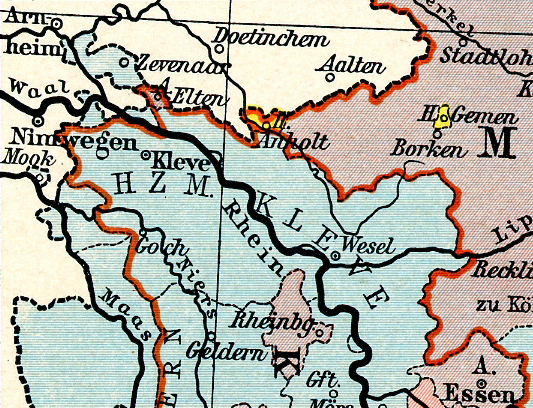
Map showing the Lordship of Anholt in upper centre (as in 1789)

During September 1580 Rogers was sent to Nuremberg, the Imperial Diet and a further mission to the Emperor Rudolf II, mainly on trade matters. He was kidnapped in October, removing him from play, as he passed through the Duchy of Cleves on his way. He was captured near Cleves by the irregular forces of Maarten Schenck van Nydeggen, who took him to Kasteel Bleijenbeek. He was then arrested on Imperial territory by Baron von Anholt, at the request of Philip II of Spain. William, Duke of Jülich-Cleves-Berg gave an account to Queen Elizabeth in June 1584, stating that Rogers was detained at the tiny Lordship of Anholt, and then Bredevoort.

Rogers spent four years in captivity. Hubert Languet wrote to Sir Philip Sidney, but the response from the English court was languid. George Gilpin of the Merchant Adventurers also made some unavailing efforts for his release. The Queen wrote in September 1583 to Duke Casimir, by which time Rogers was held at Bredevoort by Anholt's widow.

Etienne Lesieur, an agent of Walsingham, attempted to free Rogers by visiting the Duke of Cleves, and the Duke of Parma at Tournai. He was himself captured in 1585. In one version Rogers was ransomed through the baron's counsellor-at-law, Stephen Degner, a fellow-student under Melanchthon at Wittenberg. He was finally freed from Bredevoort in October 1584. The matter was not yet closed, as Lesieur reported, with Rogers detained again and taken to Boucholt, on pretexts, which amounted to further financial demands.

== Later life ==
On 5 May 1587 Rogers was appointed a clerk of the privy council; he had already filled the office of assistant clerk.

He visiting Denmark in December 1587, and was able to get the king to subsidise Henry of Navarre. He was there again in June 1588, when he conveyed expressions of sympathy from Queen Elizabeth to the young Christian IV on the death of his father Frederick II. On his own responsibility he made an arrangement under which the subjects of Denmark and Norway undertook not to serve the king of Spain against England. Rogers visited Tycho Brahe at Hven and plans were made for Rogers to help him with publication in England. In October 1590 the Danish diplomat Dr Paul Knibbe wrote to Rogers about the fleet of Admiral Peder Munk and witchcraft trials.

He was Member of Parliament for Newport, Cornwall in 1589.

Rogers died on 11 February 1591, and was buried in the church of Sunbury-on-Thames beside his father-in-law's grave.

== Associations ==
Janus Dousa was a close friend: they had met during the time Rogers spent in Paris. About three months after the foundation of the University of Leiden in 1575 by Dousa, Rogers wrote a commemorative poem. In Paris Rogers also knew some of the poets of La Pléiade (Jean-Antoine de Baïf, Jean Daurat and Guillaume des Autels), Florent Chrestien, George Buchanan, Franciscus Thorius and Germanus Valens Pimpontius. An English friend was the translator of Ronsard, Thomas Jenye. Another contact of this period was Lucas de Heere.

Rogers first met Sir Philip Sidney around the beginning of 1576, and became one of Sidney's intellectual circle, the nature of which is still debated: his letters and poetry are significant sources for its activities. Evidence for the composition and interests of this group, the so-called Areopagus including Edward Dyer and Fulke Greville, in prosody, religious poetry and music, is in his correspondence. Rogers wrote a long flattering poem addressed to Sidney, about his associations and future, from Ghent, dated 14 January 1579 and thought to have been delivered by Languet a few weeks later. In that year Rogers formed part of the opposition to Elizabeth's proposed marriage to the Duc d'Alençon, evidence of his attachment to Leicester and the Sidney circle. Through the group around Sidney, Rogers knew Paulus Melissus.

Rogers had kept up with George Buchanan from Paris days, and worked on the London edition of his De jure regni apud Scotos in 1579, communicating through Thomas Vautrollier. Rogers consulted Dousa, Sturm and François Hotman on the edition. Rogers further acted as an apologist for Buchanan's ideas on limited monarchy. They had an extensive correspondence, in particular on the proposed marriage at this period, and it has been inferred that Sidney was informed about it.

Rogers also had antiquarian tastes, and was a close friend of William Camden, who quotes some Latin poems by him in his account of Salisbury. Camden is known to have used notes of Rogers. Ortelius and Camden asked Rogers to transcribe in Germany the Peutingerian Table, relevant in their view to the Antonine Itineraries. Rogers in fact never found enough time for his scholarly projects.

Rogers was known to Jan Gruter, and wrote to Hadrianus Junius asking him for early references to the history of Ireland; he was acquainted with Justus Lipsius, perhaps from a meeting in 1577. In the late 1570s Rogers was having discussions with John Dee, concerned with the conquests made by King Arthur, and the titles of Queen Elizabeth. He may have brought Ortelius to Mortlake in 1577. As a consequence of a meeting Dee and Rogers had in 1578, the conquests of King Malgo were added to Dee's imperial schematic. Ortelius tried to have Rogers continue Humphrey Llwyd's work in ancient chorography, but without success, Rogers preferring the humanist literary approach. At the end of his life Rogers was in touch with Bonaventura Vulcanius, through Philips of Marnix, on the subject of runic alphabets.

== Works ==
Roger wrote copiously in Neo-Latin verse. Most of it remained unpublished, much surviving in manuscript. An obituary poem for Walter Haddon appeared in 1576. Verses in praise of John Jewel were appended to Lawrence Humphrey's Life of the bishop. Latin verses by Rogers also figure in the preface to Ortelius's Theatrum Orbis Terrarum and in Ralph Aggas's description of Oxford University, 1578.

== Family ==
In a Visitation of Middlesex dated 1634 it was said that Rogers had two children—a son Francis, who married a lady named Cory; and a posthumous daughter, Posthuma, who married a man named Speare.

== Notes ==
Attribution

This article incorporates text from a publication now in the public domain: Lee, Sidney, ed. (1897). "Rogers, Daniel (1538?-1591)". Dictionary of National Biography. Vol. 49. London: Smith, Elder & Co.
