= Rødding, Skive Municipality =

Rødding
- Village
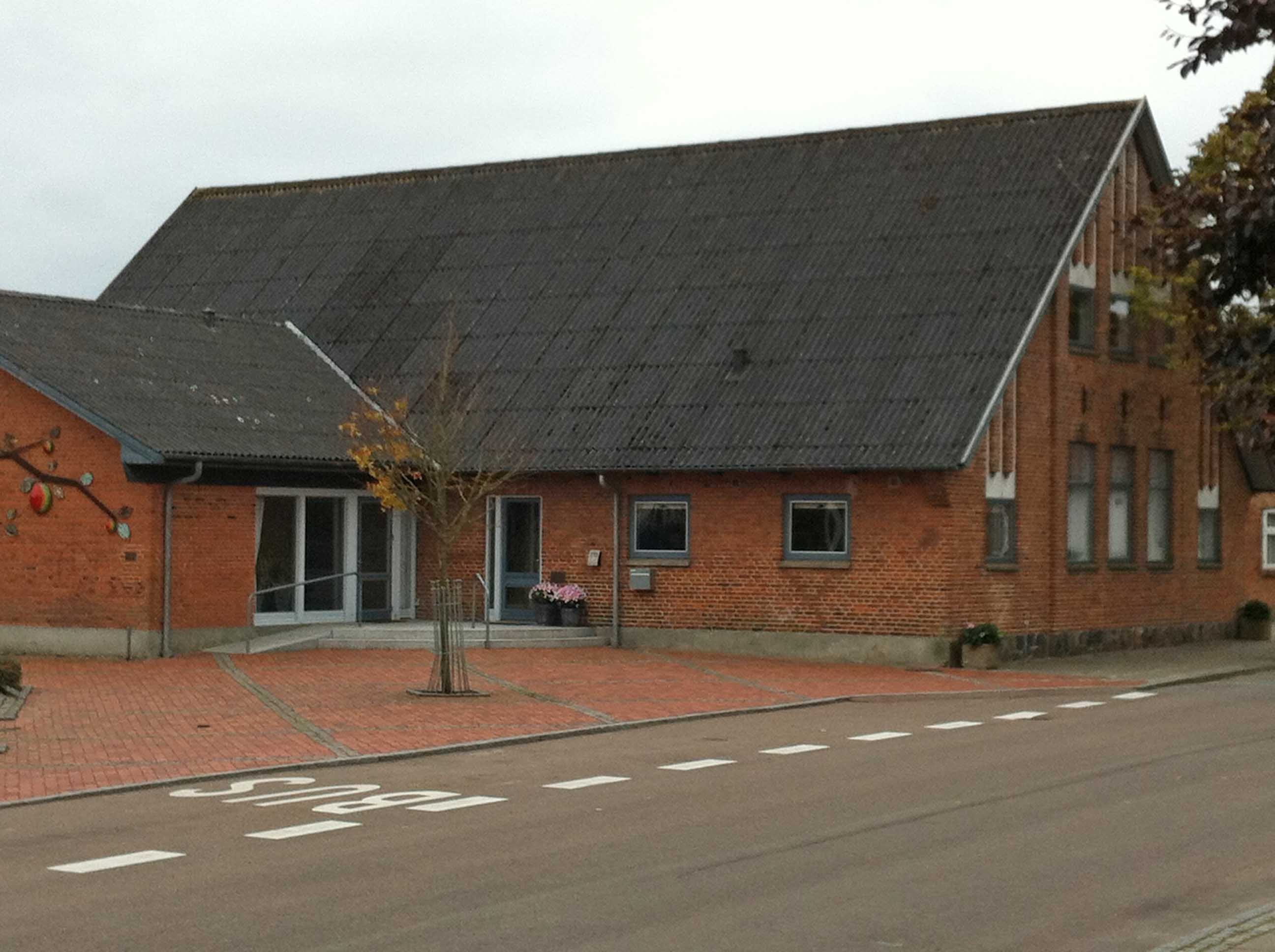
- The village hall in Rødding

- Location within Central Denmark Region Location within Denmark
- Coordinates: 56°38′36″N 8°48′28″E
- Country: Denmark
- Region: Central Denmark (Midtjylland)
- Municipality: Skive Municipality

Population (2026)
  - Total: 885

Rødding is a village, with a population of 885 (1 January 2026), in Skive Municipality, Central Denmark Region in Denmark. It is situated on the Salling peninsula 5 km northwest of Balling, 18 km southwest of Roslev and 17 km northwest of Skive.

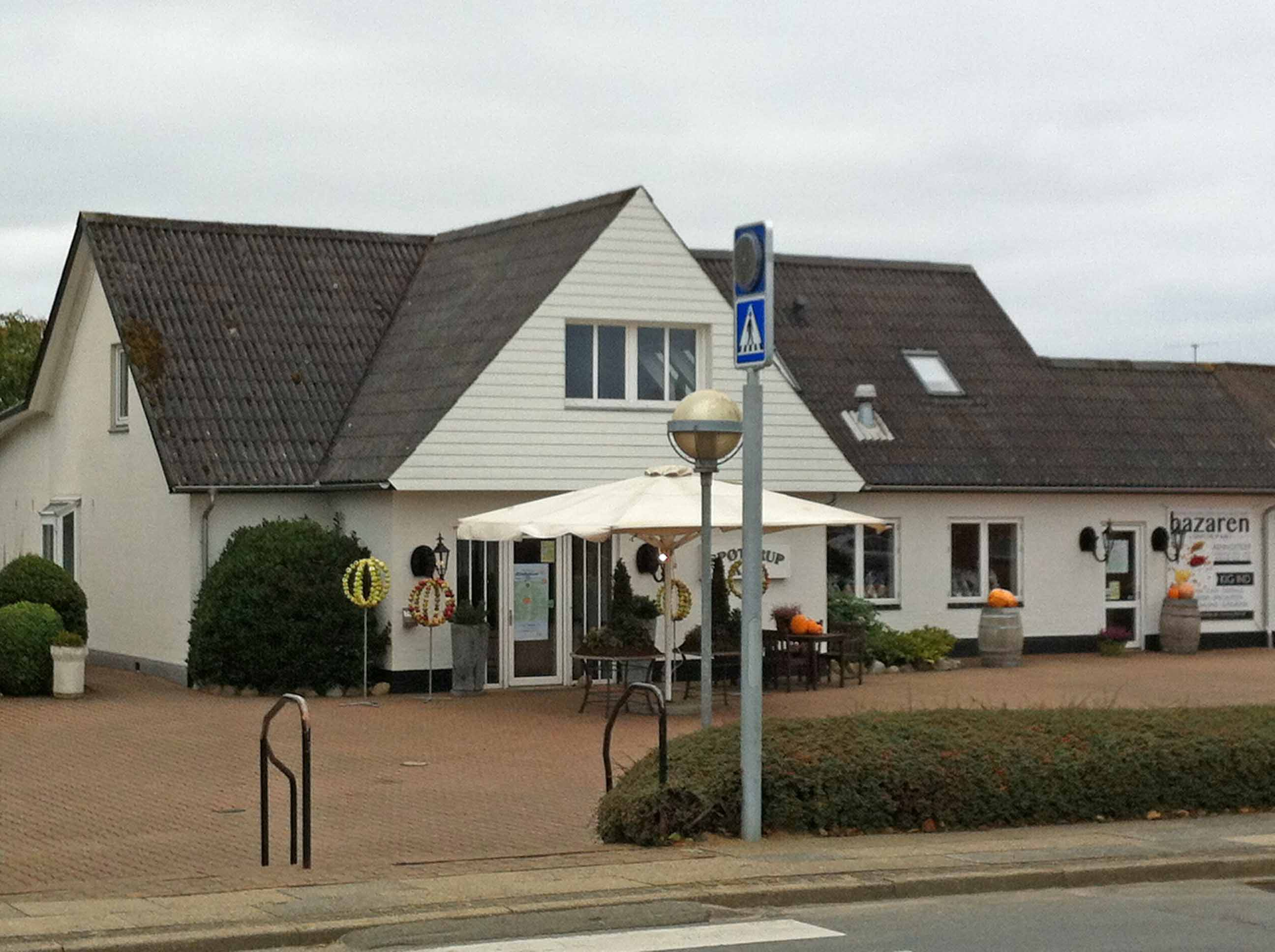
Spøttrup Kro (Spøttrup Inn) in Rødding

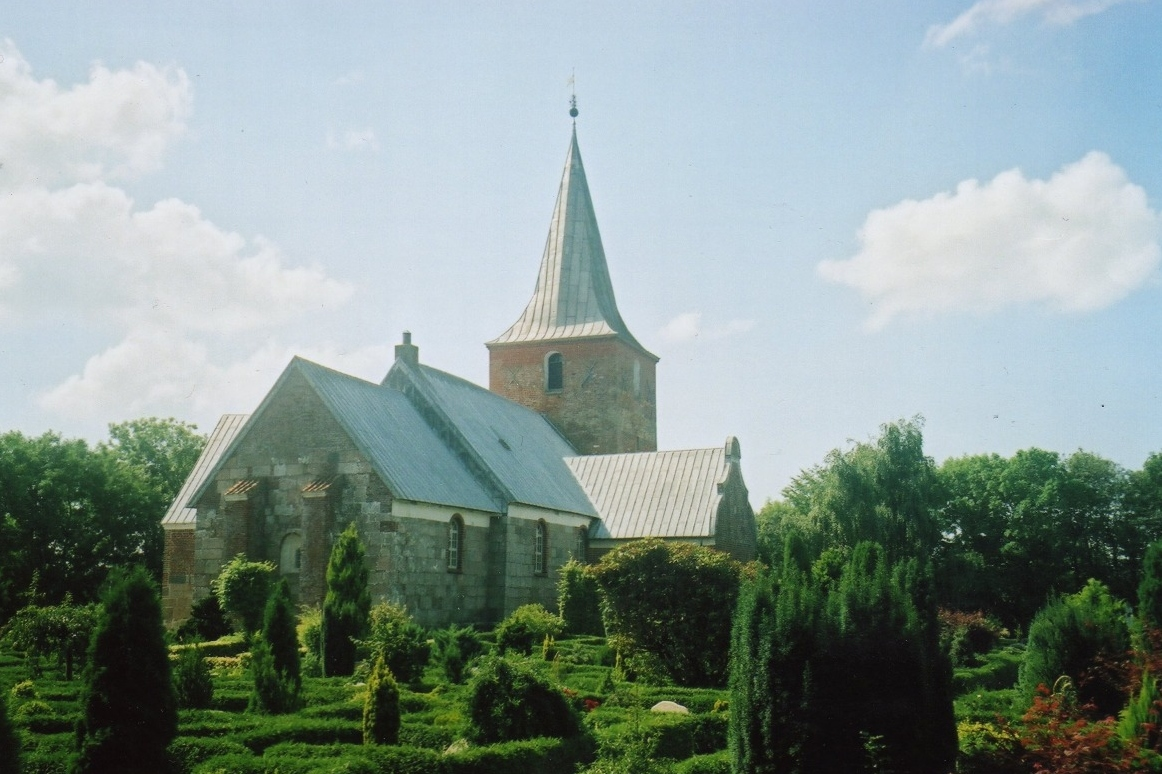
Rødding Church

Rødding Church is located in the village.

The medieval defensive castle Spøttrup Castle is located 2 km to the west between Rødding and the Limfjord.
