= Siege of Älvsborg (1612) =

Part of the Kalmar War

Coordinates: 57°40′29″N 11°51′8″E

- Part of Kalmar War
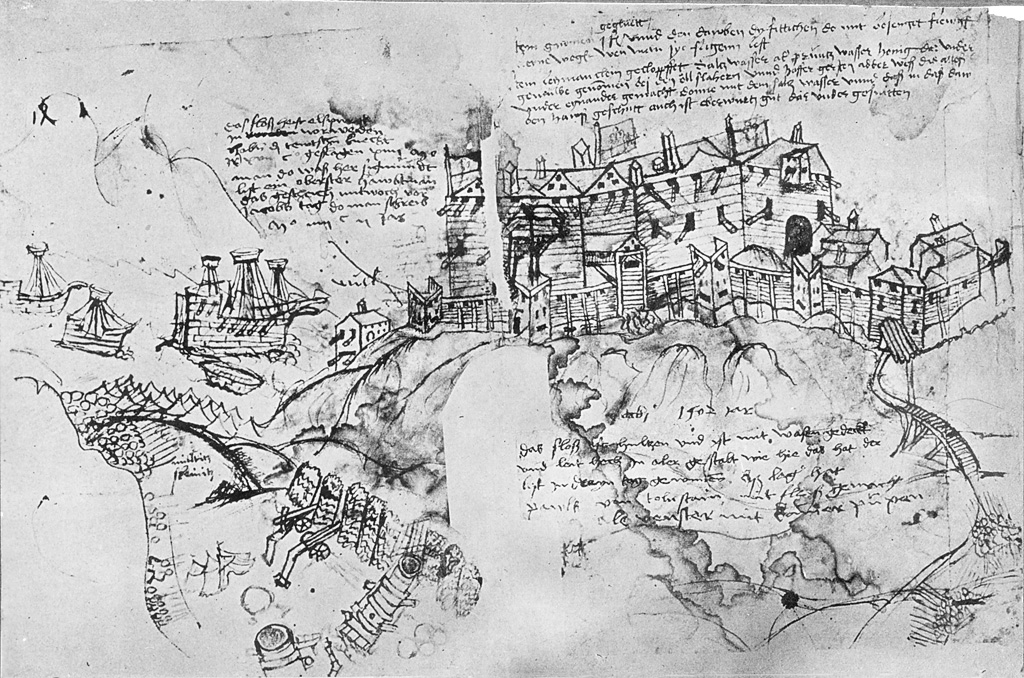
- Christian IV conquers Älvsborg
Date	5 – 31 May 1612
Location	Älvsborg Fortress, Västra Götaland, Sweden
Result	Danish Victory
Territorial changes	Älvsborg falls into Danish control

Belligerents
Denmark-Norway	(yes) Swedish Empire

Commanders and leaders
(Denmark–Norway) Christian IV	(Swedish Empire) Olof Andersson Stråle (surrendered)

Strength
c.10,000 men	600 men

Casualties and losses
Heavy; 5 ships damaged, 1 sunk	450 men

The siege of Älvsborg was a siege of the Swedish castle of Älvsborg by a Danish army under the command of Christian IV in the summer of 1612 as part of the Kalmar War. Despite the Swedes' strong defense, their commander Olof Andersson Stråle ultimately surrendered to the Danes' larger fighting forces.

== Background ==
In April 1611, Christian IV of Denmark declared war on Sweden due to the Swedish king Charles IX claiming supreme power over Finnmark, a strategic region for trading routes located along the Atlantic–White Sea that for a long time had benefited Danish–Norwegian kings with resources like fish and furs.

Älvsborg Fortress was one of Sweden's most important fortresses due to its location, as it was easy to control shipping throughout the country from the city. It also had direct access to the North Sea making maritime trading easier. Therefore, it was important for Christian IV to control the city in order to block Sweden from getting cargo from the north sea, and possibly connecting Denmark and Norway by land in the future.

On May 5, a portion of the Danish army group under the command of Christian IV reached the city and put Älvsborg under siege. On the 14th, the rest of the army arrived in the city and completed the siege.

== Siege ==
On May 5, Christian IV and a portion of his army had reached Älvsbrog and made camp, laying siege to the city. However, Christian IV had to wait for the remainder of his army before making a move. The rest of the army arrived on 14 May, but two days before, in the night between the 11th and 12th, Christian IV begun shooting on the Castle and digging closer to the city. With the entire army group now putting the city under siege, Christian IV demanded the Swedish surrender. The Swedish denied, saying that if they didn't get reinforcements in under 14 days they would surrender the castle. Christian IV retaliated, shooting at the castle again and killing several Swedes.

On the 22nd, the Danes managed to shoot a hole in the wall. Christian IV ordered a storm of the castle. The Swedes, determined to defend the castle, managed the hold off the Danish army by exploding the entrance, inflicting many casualties. Following the attack, the Danes retreated to their camp. The damage done by the Danes had caused a lot of Swedish casualties, however when Christian IV on the 23rd asked the Swedes for the surrender of the castle again they refused, saying they would take a day to think it over.

On the morning of May 24, the Swedish commander Olof Andersson Stråle and the rest of his army moved out of the castle, surrendering it to the Danes. Älvsborg remained under Danish control for the rest of the war.

== Aftermath ==
On the 28th, a portion of the army which had besieged Älvsborg had made its way towards Guldborg which they proceeded to besiege. Christian IV also attended the siege the day after. While the Swedes in Guldborg were not as prepared to defend the castle as the ones on Älvsborg, they refused to surrender the castle until the Danes had shown dominance. Christian proceeded to fire a few shots on the city, forcing the Swedes to surrender Guldborg on the first of June.

== Bibliography ==
- Liljefalk, Axel. Kalmarkrigen : et Bidrag til de nordiske Rigers Krigshistorie : efter trykte og utrykte Kilder.
- F.H. Jahn: Historie om Kalmarkrigen Köpenhamn, 1820 (in Danish)
- Jonas Hedborg: Kungl. artilleriet. Yngre vasatiden 1985 (in Swedish)
