= Spøttrup Castle =

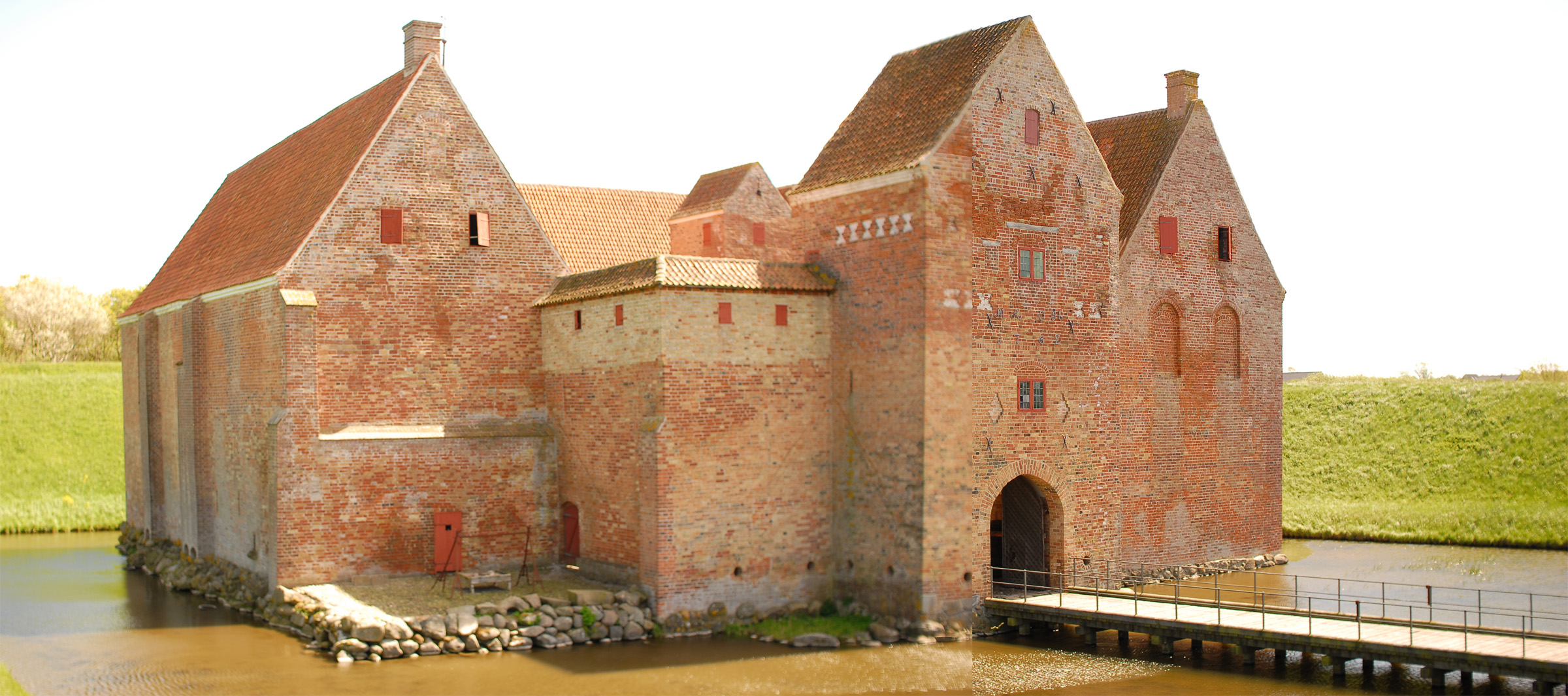
- Spøttrup Castle
- Interactive map of the Spøttrup Castle area

General information
- Location: Borgen 6A, 7860 Spøttrup, Denmark
- Coordinates: 56°38′23″N 8°46′58″E

Spøttrup Castle (Danish: Spøttrup Borg) is a well-preserved medieval defensive castle in Jutland, Denmark. It is situated 18 km (11 mi) northwest of Skive and 2 km (1.2 mi) west of the village of Rødding.

The castle is located at the eastern shore of Spøttrup Lake, a small lake just east of the Limfjord.

== History ==
The estate was transferred to the Diocese of Viborg in 1404. It became the property of the Crown in 1536 and was sold to Henrik Below (1540–1606), a nobleman with the Danish court. The oldest section of the building is the south wing, which was constructed c. 1521. The east and north wings followed between 1525 and 1530. The western end of the north wing was destroyed by an incoming tidal wave in 1534. The large arched windows were walled up, leaving only narrow sighting slits. The oldest part of the building is the cellar with cross vaults supported by pillars. The ramparts and the double moat served to defend the castle from cannon fire.

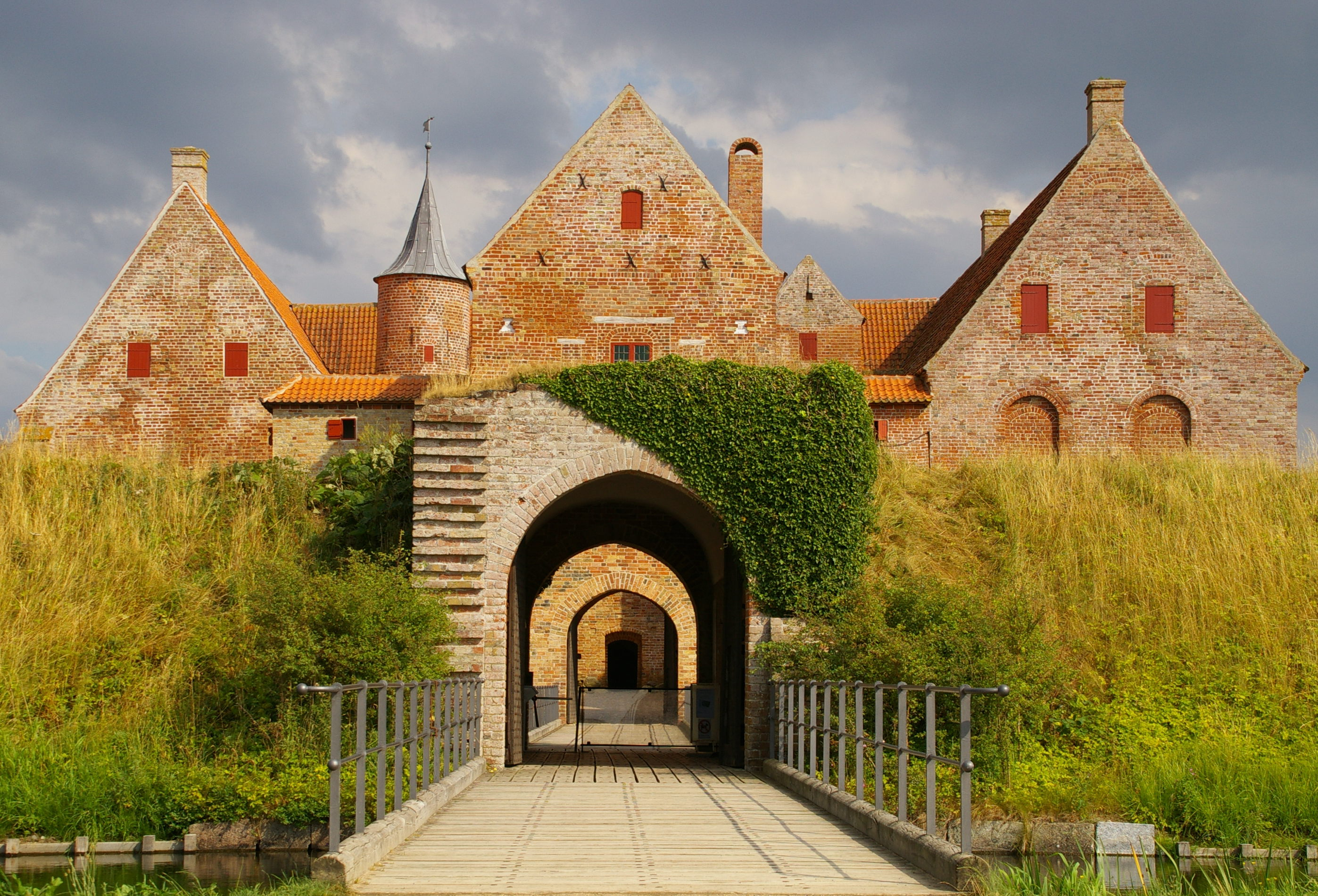
Castle entrance

After Below acquired the castle, he fitted it out as a stately family home with towers and a ballroom. With the Reformation, the castle lost its importance as a fort and was uninhabited for an extended period. In 1702, Axel Rosenkrantz acquired the dilapidated property and proceeded to renovate it. On his death in 1724, his son Mogens Rosenkrantz took it over. In 1784, Peder Nissen, a rich farmer from Ribe bought the castle, leaving it to his 17-year-old son Nis Nissen when he died four years later. After Nis's death in 1849, the property came into the hands of successive owners, none of whom were able to carry out necessary repairs. Finally, after a fire in 1937, the state decided to acquire the castle and the 338 ha (840 acres) estate. Restoration work was completed in 1941, leading to the opening of the building as a museum on 15 June 1941.

== Open to visitors ==
The castle museum is open to visitors from mid-April to the end of October.
