= Rantzau's reconquest of Öland =

Successful Danish invasion of Öland

- Part of the Kalmar War
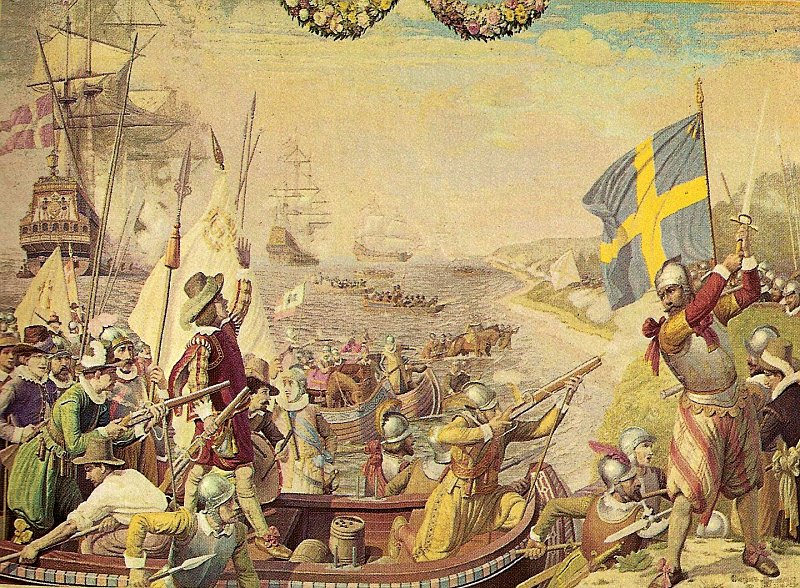
- Rantzau's men land on Öland, 31 May 1612, depicted in one of the tapestries in Fredriksborg Castle
Date	31 May – 13 June 1612
Location	Öland
Result	Danish victory
Territorial changes	Öland reconquered by Denmark

Belligerents
(yes) Swedish Empire	Denmark–Norway

Commanders and leaders
(Swedish Empire) Per Hammarskiöld	(Denmark–Norway) Gert von Rantzau

Units involved
(Swedish Empire) Borgholm garrison (Swedish Empire) 3 infantry companies	(Denmark–Norway) 16 cavalry companies

Strength
1,300 men c. 6 guns	Unknown, but more than the Swedes; 16 ships At least 4 guns

Casualties and losses
At least 700 killed	Unknown

Rantzau's reconquest of Öland refers to a successful Danish invasion and reconquest of Öland from 30 May to 13 June 1612 during the Kalmar War, led by Gert von Rantzau.

== Background ==
After the conquest of Ryssby, the fleeing Swedish forces escaped to Ålem, and Gert von Rantzau chose to pursue them and push them out of their new camp after arriving in Kalmar. On 22 May, Rantzau led his army out of Kalmar, along with sending three cavalry banners to flank with orders to attack Ålem from the rear. However, the Swedes, led by Admiral Bååt, delayed the Danes, retreating to Högsby, and secured the road to Jönköping. As he was unwilling to continue pursuing the Swedes, Rantzau returned to Kalmar.

Instead of being drawn further inland, Rantzau intended to carry out orders from Christian IV to reconquer Öland. The plan was likely for Rantzau to capture Ryssby and conquer Öland while Christian captured Älvsborg, after which they would unite for an invasion into mainland Sweden. Öland was defended by Per Hammarskiöld, and he had few men to defend the island, which consisted of his old Småland banner of cavalry, one Öland company, two Småland companies, one Finnish company, two Dalecarlian companies, and the peasant levy.

=== Danish plan ===
By the end of May, Rantzau's army and the main Danish fleet of some 16 ships had assembled at Kalmar. Rantzau created an ambitious plan, where the landings would occur at night in three locations, one with eight companies of knights on Öland's coastline in the north around Bornholm, the second at Färjestaden across the strait from Kalmar, and another eight companies of knights in the south. After landing, the Danes would create bridgeheads, after which the main force would be taken across the straight under cover from artillery from the fleet towards Mörbylånga, where the main Danish bridgehead would be established.

== Invasion ==
On the night between 30 and 31 May, the Danish plan was carried out, and the following morning, the main Danish force was shipped across the strait, including its siege artillery. At Färjestaden, Hammarskiöld had created a strong redoubt. However, since the main Danish bridgehead was at Mörbylånga, and the 1,300 men at Hammarskiölds disposal would not be able to prevent the landing, and with the redoubt under Danish artillery fire, Hammarskiöld was forced to evacuate the redoubt, withdrawing to another position some 10 kilometers south from Borgholm. When the Danes landed at Mörbylånga, they quickly repulsed the Swedes there.

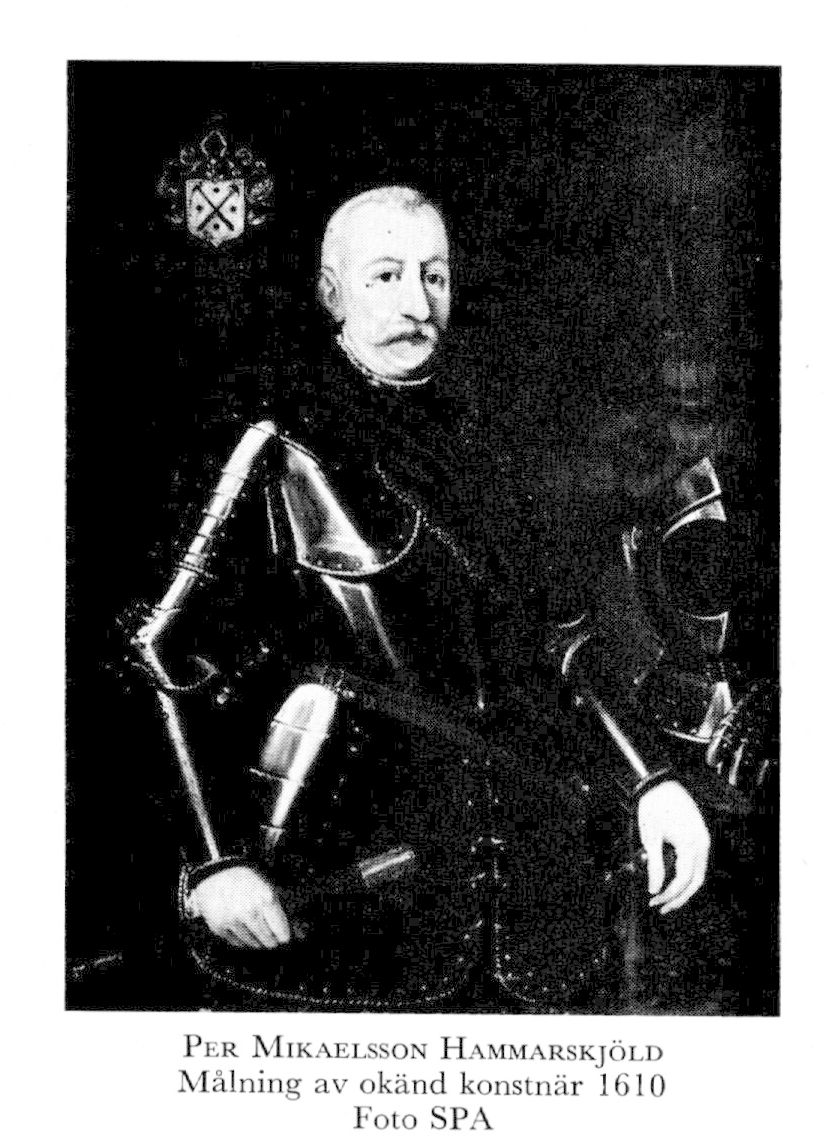
Portrait of Per Hammarskiöld

On 1 June, Hammarskiöld deployed all of the men at his disposal, being the Småland banner, three companies of infantry, some six light cannons, and peasant levies. He put the soldiers in the center, and the peasant levies on the flanks. The Danes, outnumbering the Swedes, attacked the Swedish center, but were repulsed in the first charge. However, in the second, the Danes managed to disperse the outnumbered Swedish cavalry and separate the Swedes from Borgholm, which the Danes had surrounded. The Swedish losses in the battle were some 400 men according to Danish estimates, along with some guns and a number of standards. During the same night, the Danes began constructing a siege artillery battery at Borgholm, with the Swedish counterfire from the fortress delaying it. However, on the night between 6 and 7 June, the Danes managed to deploy their 24-pounder cannons.

Within only a few days, Rantzau brought in four more heavy cannons. Additionally, on 2 June, Rantzau had sent a trumpeter, demanding Bornholm surrender, with Hammarskiöld refusing and firing on it, violating the laws of war. The Danish artillery caused significant damage, with the Swedes repairing the damages to the tower and walls as much as possible, but the damage outpaced their repairs. On 12 June, there was a breach in the wall, being large enough "to drive through with four carts in a line." After the breach, Hammarskiöld spoke to his men, urging them to fight valiantly.

== Aftermath ==
At this point, Hammarskiöld notified the Danes that he was ready to discuss surrender terms, other sources claiming the garrison itself did so. The Danes at first, claimed that it was too late for the Swedes to surrender, as the wall had already been breached. However, on 13 June, another trumpeter arrived, offering the Swedes the opportunity to surrender, except for Hammarskiöld. However, the Swedes refused to give their commander over, and threatened to set fire to the gunpowder depot and blow the castle up. Rantzau promptly gave in, offering free departure to everyone, along with their personal belongings, and being shipped to a Swedish port, on the condition that they swore an oath to not raise arms against the Danish Crown for three months, along with all standards and weapons being left behind.

Hammarskiöld agreed to the new terms and surrendered the castle. However, despite the agreement, the Danish soldiers attempted to massacre the Swedish survivors as they left and plundered their belongings, with only some 200 apparently surviving. Because of the plundering, Hammarskiöld announced that the oath was invalid.

On 20 June, the Danish army returned to Kalmar, leaving Christian Friis to garrison the island with five companies of infantry.

== Works cited ==
- Isacson, Claes-Göran (2006). Vägen till stormakt : Vasaättens krig [The road to great power: The wars of the Vasa dynasty] (in Swedish). Norstedts. ISBN 9789113015026.
- Essen, Michael Fredholm von (9 August 2023). The Kalmar War 1611-1613: Gustavus Adolphus's First War. Helion & Company. ISBN 9781804510063.
- Generalstaben (1936). Sveriges krig, 1611-1632 [Sweden's Wars, 1611-1632] (in Swedish). Vol. 1. Generalstaben.
- Starbäck, Carl Georg; Bäckström, Per Olof (1885). Berättelser ur svenska historien: Volumes 4-5 [Stories from Swedish history] (in Swedish). Beijer.
