= Breide Rantzau =

German nobleman in Danish-Norwegian service

Breide Rantzau (13 October 1556 – 10 January 1618) was a German nobleman in Danish-Norwegian service. He served as stadtholder of Copenhagen from 1602.

== Early life ==
He was born on 13 October 1556 at Segeberg, the son of Heinrich Rantzau, and the older brother of Gert Rantzau (1558-1627).

== Career ==
He was a councillor of the Danish realm in the minority of Christian IV of Denmark.

In September 1589 he was chosen to accompany Anne of Denmark when she sailed to Scotland to join her husband James VI, with the Admiral Peder Munk, Paul Knibbe, and Niels Krag. The voyage was interrupted by storms and they rested at Oslo where James VI joined them.

After returning to Copenhagen and Kronborg, Breide Rantzau came to Scotland in May 1590, as one of the ambassadors with Peder Munk and Steen Brahe accompanying James VI and Anna of Denmark. He had some family connection with Sophia Kaas (or Koss), who was staying with his wife when she was called to be a lady in waiting to Anna of Denmark. Kaas became a favourite in Scotland, and with another gentlewoman, Katrine Skinkel, wore hats that matched the queen's.

After the coronation of Anna of Denmark, the town of Edinburgh held a banquet for the Danish ambassadors on 23 May 1590 with musicians and a guard of honour armed with polearms. On 26 May the Danish ambassadors embarked on their ships, and the king gave them gold chains and gifts worth 4,500 crowns. One ambassador was given a gold chain worth 500 crowns paid for from the queen's dowry. James VI and Anna rode on the sands of Leith in view of their ships lying at anchor.

During the Kalmar War he fought Gustavus Adolphus at the battle of Vittsjö.

== Property ==
In addition to Rantzausholm, he owned a number of estates, including Mogenstrup in Scania and Hellerup on Funen, which he bought in 1599 from Eiler Brockenhuus. He inherited Hindemaegaard manor located south of Ullerslev, on Funen in 1605.

Breide Rantzau died in 1618.

== Marriages and children ==
He married Sophie Rosenkrantz (1560-1593), a daughter of the respected and wealthy councillor Erik Ottesen Rosenkrantz (1519-1575) of Kjærstrup, on 1 March 1579 at Koldinghus, at the court of Frederick II of Denmark.

After his first wife died on 29 December 1593, he married 7 May 1598 Karen Gjøe, daughter of Absalon Gjøe. After her death in 1599, on 26 July 1601 he married Christence Viffert, daughter of Corfits Viffert and widow of Henrik Bille of Mogenstrup; she died in 1604.
