= Robert Beale (diplomat) =

Member of the Parliament of England

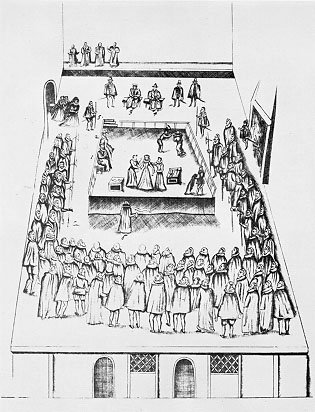
This sketch of the execution of Mary, Queen of Scots was drawn to accompany Robert Beale's official record of the proceedings.

Robert Beale (1541 – 25 May 1601) was an English diplomat, administrator, and antiquary in the reign of Elizabeth I. As Clerk of the Privy Council, Beale wrote the official record of the execution of Mary, Queen of Scots, to which he was an eyewitness.

== Early life ==
Robert Beale, born in 1541, was the eldest son of a London mercer, Robert Beale (died c. 1548), and Amy Morison, thought to have been a daughter of Sir Richard Morison. He was educated at Coventry, likely at the school set up there by John Hales, with whom he was closely associated, and whose brother, Stephen Hales (d. 1574), was married to Sir Richard Morison's sister, also named Amy. According to Bell, Hales 'imparted to Beale his views on religious and social reform, as well as his interest in classical learning'. Although he never took a degree, Beale studied civil law, and may have attended Cambridge.

As a Marian exile Beale studied at Strasbourg, where he lived at the house of Sir Richard Morison. After Morison died in 1556, Beale studied 'logic, rhetoric and Greek' under John Aylmer at Zurich. In 1562 Lord John Grey of Pyrgo consulted him concerning the validity of the marriage of his niece Lady Catherine Grey with Edward Seymour, 1st Earl of Hertford, and Beale made a journey to the continent to lay the case before Oldendorpius and eminent Italian canonists. The opinion which Beale formed he subsequently maintained in a Latin tract; a royal commission, with Archbishop Matthew Parker at its head, pronounced the marriage void at the time, but its validity was established in 1606.

== Diplomatic career ==
In 1564 he obtained a post with the English embassy in Paris, and travelled into Germany. Walsingham found him in Paris on his appointment as ambassador-resident there in 1570, and made him his secretary. In the correspondence between Lord Burghley and Walsingham of this period he is frequently mentioned as carrying despatches between Paris and London. A witness to the massacre of St. Bartholomew two years later (24 August 1572), he wrote a Discourse by way of Letter to the Lord Burghley shortly after the event. The same year he succeeded Robert Monson, then raised to the bench, as M.P. for Totnes. About this time he was appointed clerk to the council.

In April 1576 he was sent to Flushing to recover goods which the Flushingers had seized, consisting partly of merchandise and partly of property of Edward de Vere, 17th Earl of Oxford; and in the following year he accompanied Admiral William Wynter to the Low Countries to demand the liberation of the English merchant ships on which the Prince of Orange had laid an embargo in the Scheldt River in retaliation for acts of piracy committed by English privateers on Dutch shipping. The ships were set free at once, but an indemnity for the detention, which Beale was instructed to claim, was disputed. After the Formula of Concord of 1577 had defined so-called Cryptocalvinists as heretics, Beale and Paulus Knibbius toured nine German courts for Queen Elizabeth, to intervene with Lutheran princes for religious toleration. He impressed Hubert Languet, who gave him an introduction to Sir Philip Sidney.

During Walsingham's absence in the Netherlands in the summer of 1578, Beale acted as secretary of state, as also in 1581 and 1583, on occasion of Walsingham's missions to France and Scotland in those years. In the autumn of 1580 he took part in the examination of Richard Stanihurst about the conveying of Gerald Fitzgerald, Lord Offaly, to Spain at the instigation of Thomas Fleming. In 1581 he was one of the commissioners who took the depositions of Edmund Campion before his trial; his commission extended only to threatening with torture. The same year Walsingham was appointed governor of the Mines Royal, and made Beale his deputy.

Between 1581 and 1584 he was employed in negotiating with Mary, Queen of Scots, at Sheffield. Mary wished for an "Association" between herself and her son James VI as rulers of Scotland, but Elizabeth's advisors hoped she would concede her title, having abdicated in 1567. During these talks, Beale presented to Mary a gold jewel in the form of a rock, set with diamonds and rubies, probably a gift from Elizabeth I. Beale was suspected of secret partiality to Mary's cause. Beale was involved with a letter that Mary sent to James VI about Captain Errington. In 1584, Beale wrote to Walsingham of a lack of progress in the talks with Mary.

In 1584 Beale was returned to Parliament for Dorchester, which he also represented in the two succeeding parliaments (1586 and 1589). In November 1586 he was despatched with Lord Buckhurst to Fotheringay, to notify the Queen of Scots of the fact that sentence of death had been passed upon her. Early in the following year, Beale carried the warrant to Fotheringay and performed the duty of reading it aloud in the hall of the castle by way of preliminary to the execution, of which he was an eye-witness, and wrote an account.

Though a Puritan, Beale maintained the principle of toleration, both in Parliament and as a writer. He published a work impugning the right of the crown to fine or imprison for ecclesiastical offences, and condemning the use of torture to induce confession, and followed it up at a later date with a second treatise (by 1584) on the same subject. John Whitgift then drew up and laid before the council a 'schedule of misdemeanours' alleged to have been committed by Beale; no notice was taken of it. Beale had shown the archbishop the manuscript of another work on the prerogative of the bishops, which caused a clash.

In the summer he served on logistics under Robert Dudley, 1st Earl of Leicester in the Netherlands during the attempt to relieve Sluys. In 1589 he was employed in negotiation with the Dutch States, and next year with Burghley and Buckhurst adjusted the accounts of Peregrine Bertie, Lord Willoughby, commander in the Netherlands. In 1592 the attitude which Beale assumed in a debate on supply with another speech against the inquisitorial practices of the bishops, gave so much offence to the queen that he was commanded to absent himself both from court and from Parliament. In 1592 he addressed a lengthy letter to Burghley as Lord Treasurer vindicating his opinions on church government. The following year he was returned to Parliament for Lostwithiel.

In 1595 Robert Devereux, 2nd Earl of Essex tried to deprive Beale of his office of clerk to the council in favour of one of his own creatures; Beale wrote (24 April 1595) to the Lord Treasurer. He was also clerk to the Council of the North; Beale concluded his letter by begging that he might be allowed a deputy to do the business of the office at York during his absence. His request was granted, one John Ferne being appointed in the following August. In 1597 he was with Sir Julius Caesar in a commission to examine into complaints by the inhabitants of Guernsey against Sir Thomas Leighton, their governor. In 1599 he was placed on a special commission to hear and adjudge the grievances of Danish subjects who complained of piratical acts committed by English subjects.

In 1600 he was appointed one of the envoys to treat for peace with the King of Spain at Boulogne. The negotiation fell through, the representatives not being able to agree on the question of precedency.

== Private life ==
In 1601 Beale died at his house at Barnes, at eight o'clock in the evening of 25 May. He was buried in Allhallows Church, London Wall. He left two daughters, of whom one, Margaret, married Sir Henry Yelverton, who had Beale's books and papers at Easton-Maudit. The library was sold in 1784, and the manuscripts went to the British Museum. The other daughter, Catherine, married Nathaniel Stephens, of Easington, Gloucestershire.

He had been a member of the Elizabethan Society of Antiquaries, and is mentioned by Thomas Milles in the epistle dedicatory to his Catalogue of Honour. In 1582 he discussed the North-west Passage with John Dee, John Davis, and Adrian Gilbert. He had another house at Priors Marston, in Warwickshire, and is described as of that place in the inscriptions on the tombstone of his wife and daughter Catherine.

== Marriage and issue ==
Beale married Edith St. Barbe, the daughter of Henry St. Barbe of Somerset, and sister of the wife of Sir Francis Walsingham, by whom he had two sons and nine daughters.

== Works ==
Throughout life Beale was a collector of books. His written works include:

- Argument touching the Validity of the Marriage of Charles Brandon, Duke of Suffolk, with Mary, Queen-dowager of France (sister to King Henry VIII), and the Legitimacy of the Lady Frances, their daughter. In Latin, MS. Cambridge University Library Dd. 3, 85, art. 18.
- A Large Discourse concerning the Marriage between the Earl of Hertford and the Lady Catherine Grey. In Latin, MS. Cambridge University Library Ii. 5, 3, art. 4. This work contains also the opinions of the foreign jurists consulted by Beale upon the case.
- Discourse after the Massacre in France, 15 pp. MS. Cott. Tit. F. iii. 299.
- A Book against Oaths ministered in the Courts of Ecclesiastical Commission from Her Majesty, and in other Courts Ecclesiastical. Printed abroad and brought to England in a Scotch ship about 1583.
- A Book respecting Ceremonies, the Habits, the Book of Common Prayer, and the Power of Ecclesiastical Courts, 1584
- The Order and Manner of the Execution of Mary Queen of Scots, 8 Feb 1587.
- A Summary Collection of certain Notes against the Manner of proceeding ex officio by Oath.
- A Consideration of certain Points in the Treaty to be enlarged or altered in case Her Majesty make a new Treaty with the States, April 1589. MS. Cott. Galba, D. iv. 163. In this Beale was assisted by Dr. Bartholomew Clerke.
- A Deliberation of Henry Killigrew and Robert Beale concerning the Requisition for Restitution from the States. London, August 1595. MS. Cott. Galba, D. xi. 125.
