= Kalmar War =

Denmark–Norway fought Sweden, 1611–1613

- Part of a series of Dano–Swedish Wars
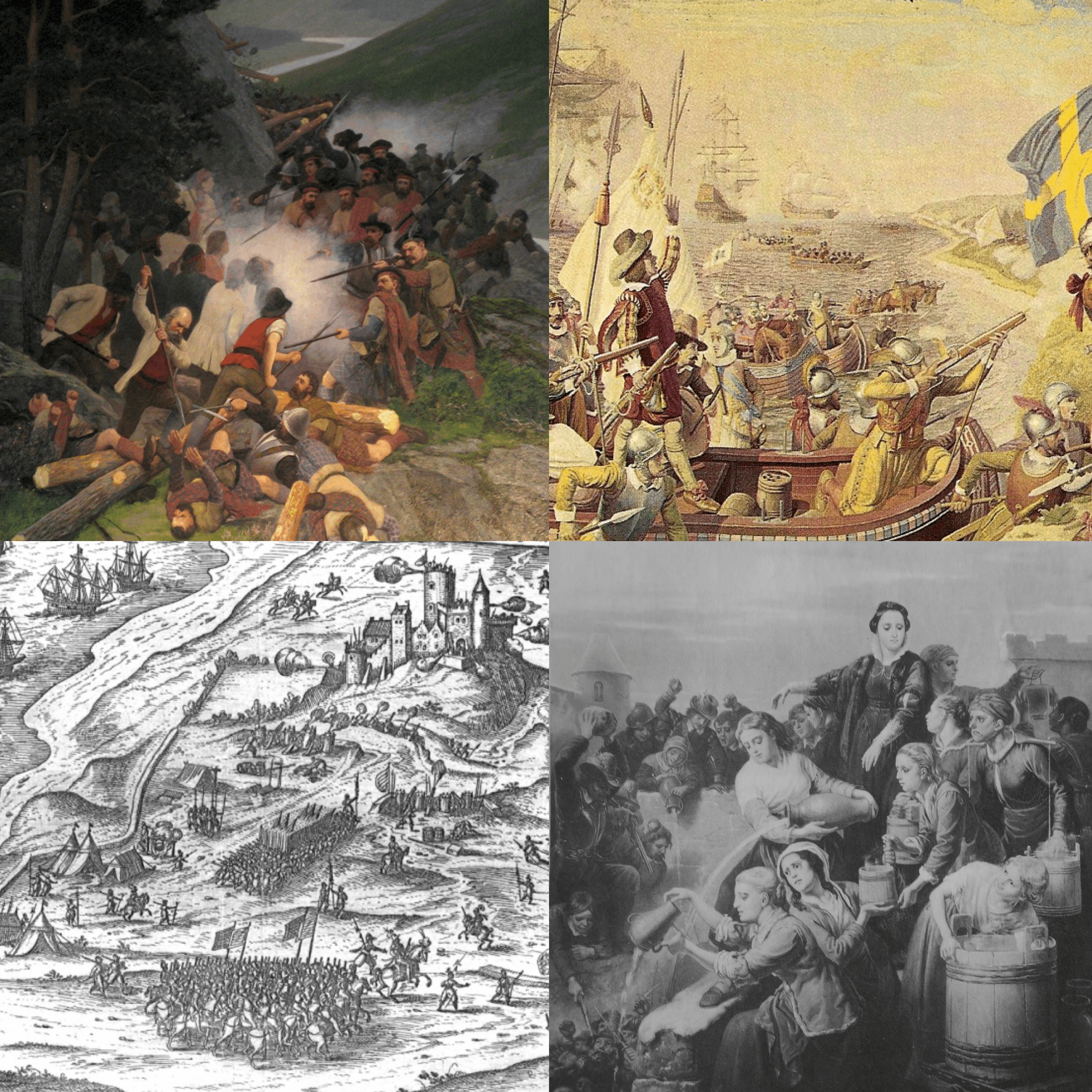
- Clockwise, from top left: Kringen; Öland; Älvsborg; Gullberg Castle
Date	1611–1613
Location	Scandinavia (Öland, Småland, Göta älv, Norway); Baltic Sea
Result	Dano–Norwegian victory Full results: Treaty of Knäred; All conquests made by both sides are returned; Denmark–Norway stays as the dominant Nordic power; Swedish ships are allowed free passage through The Sound; Sweden pays 1 million rixdollars as ransom for Älvsborg
Territorial changes	Älvsborg temporarily controlled by Denmark (1613)

Belligerents
Denmark–Norway	Swedish Empire

Commanders and leaders
Christian IV; Breide Rantzau; Sven Sehested; Peder Nielsen; Jens Bjørnsen †	(Swedish Empire) Charles IX # (Swedish Empire) Gustavus Adolphus (Swedish Empire) Bo Bååt (Swedish Empire) Jakob Snakenborg (Swedish Empire) Peder Hammarskjöld

Strength
20,000	21,000

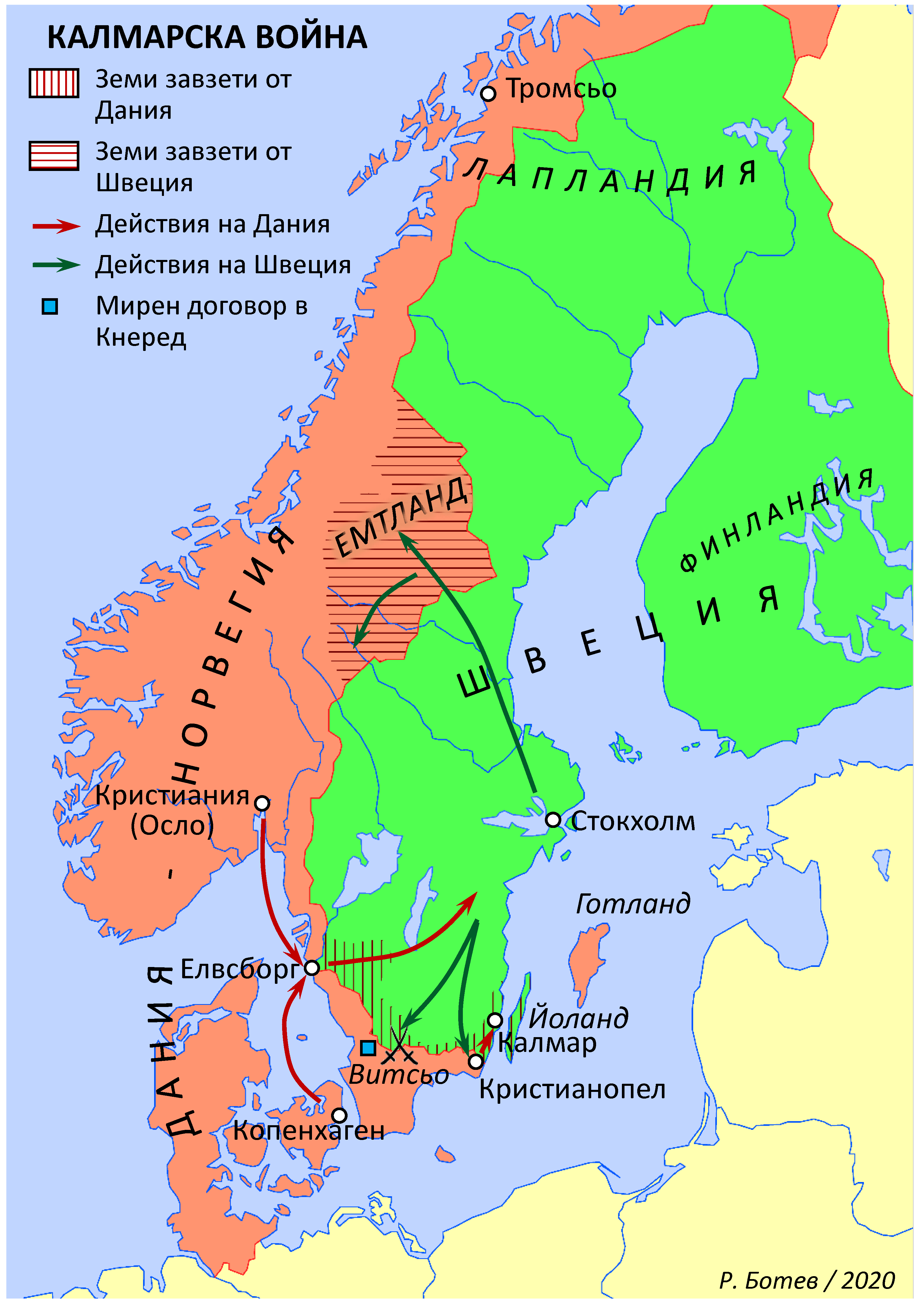
Map of military movements during the War

The Kalmar War (1611–1613) was fought between Denmark–Norway and Sweden. Though Denmark–Norway soon gained the upper hand, it was unable to defeat Sweden entirely. The Kalmar War was the last time Denmark–Norway successfully defended its dominium maris baltici against Sweden, and it also marked the increasing influence of the two countries on Baltic politics.

== Background ==
Since Denmark–Norway controlled the strait between the Baltic Sea and the North Sea, Sweden sought an alternative trade route through sparsely populated Lapland to avoid paying Denmark's Sound Dues. In 1607, Charles IX of Sweden declared himself "King of the Lapps in Nordland" and began "collecting" taxes in Norwegian territory, even south of Tromsø.

Since the Sound Dues were Denmark's main source of income, Denmark–Norway did not want to see alternative trade routes established, particularly when established through Norwegian territory. Denmark–Norway protested.

King Charles IX of Sweden ignored the protests of King Christian IV of Denmark and Norway. Finally, in April 1611, in response to Sweden's claim of a traditionally Norwegian area in Northern Norway, Denmark–Norway declared war upon Sweden and invaded.

== War ==
=== 1611: Beginning of the war ===
The Swedes were ill-prepared for war, as their main field army was engaged in the Ingrian War, and obtaining further mercenaries was out of the question.

The Danish-Norwegian side planned to attack Sweden on three fronts; from Kristianopel towards Kalmar, from Halmstad towards Jönköping, and from the Norwegian side towards the fortress of Älvsborg and thereafter further into Västergötland.

A force of 5,200 Danish troops laid siege to the city of Kalmar, ultimately taking it. The Swedes were forced to scuttle some 20 ships in Kalmar to prevent the Danes from capturing them. Norwegian forces, although stationed on the border, were instructed not to enter Sweden. On 26 June a Swedish force carried out the Storming of Kristianopel.

In the summer of 1611, Swedish forces under Baltzar Bäck were ordered to invade Norwegian Jämtland. They did so, and armed Swedish peasants marched into Härjedalen. Both Jämtland and Härjedalen were conquered without much fight. However, Bäck's lack of ability, or will, to stop excesses against the population meant that the locals eventually rose up against the Swedish occupants. In the end, the Swedish troops could not handle the situation and were forced to leave Jämtland and Härjedalen in autumn 1612.

=== 1612 ===
On 20 October 1611 King Charles IX of Sweden died and was succeeded by his son, Gustavus Adolphus. On ascending the throne, Gustavus Adolphus sued for peace, but Christian IV saw an opportunity for larger victories, and strengthened his armies in southern Sweden. In response, Gustavus began conducting raids along the border between Denmark and Sweden. In a February raid, Gustavus nearly drowned at the Battle of Vittsjö after being surprised by a Danish army.

In early 1612, Denmark–Norway attacked and eventually conquered two fortresses on the border between the fighting countries, Älvsborg and Gullberg, both in present-day Gothenburg. This was a major setback for Sweden, as the country now lacked access to the sea in the west. Having achieved this success, and aiming to end the war as soon as possible, the Danish command ordered an attack deep into Sweden, towards the capital of Stockholm. However, this proved to be a failure. Scorched earth methods and guerrilla warfare from the Swedish side made this a very difficult task and many of the mercenaries in the Danish army deserted since they did not receive their pay. Thus, the Danish army could never mount a serious attack on the capital itself. In August and September 1612, Christian IV's naval expedition to Stockholm failed. Christian intended to attack and capture the capital, this time from the sea, but did not have the sufficient troops to carry this out. He abanonded the attempt on 4 September, leaving the Stockholm Archipelago by 10 September. This was the last notable engagement of the Kalmar War, which by this point had become a stalemate.

=== Peace of Knäred ===
England and the Dutch Republic were also invested in the Baltic Sea trade, and pressured to curtail Denmark–Norway's power by ending the Kalmar War before a decisive victory could be attained. The Danes and Norwegians, while well-equipped and strong, had relied heavily on mercenary forces and Christian IV, low on funds, was finally amenable to persuasion in 1613. With the intercession of James I of England, the Treaty of Knäred was signed on 20 January 1613.

Denmark–Norway reached its victory, restoring Norwegian control of Sweden's land route through Lapland by incorporating Lapland as a part of Norway. Further, Sweden had to pay a high ransom for two fortresses (Älvsborg and Gullberg), two towns and six surrounding hundreds captured by Denmark–Norway. Sweden, however, achieved a major concession — the right of free trade through the Sound Strait, becoming exempt from the Sound toll.

== Aftermath ==
One of the results coming out of the Kalmar War was the establishment of Denmark–Norway as a competent army recognized throughout Europe. Still, because the Dano–Norwegian alliance did not achieve a total overall victory, Sweden would recover under Gustavus Adolphus. Surprisingly enough, Sweden and the Danish and Norwegians would enter into a brief alliance in the coming Thirty Years' War. Eventually, however, Danish lack of gains in the war and eventual withdrawal, and Sweden's successful military campaign and rise in power led to Sweden's counterattack in the Torstenson War where Denmark–Norway would lose and cede control of the Baltic Sea to the King of Sweden.

The Kalmar War, in addition to the Northern Seven Years' War before, gave rise to centuries of rivalry between the Norwegians and the Swedes which greatly influenced the machinations of the personal union between the two countries after the Dano–Norwegian loss in 1814. Rather than ceding Norway to Sweden like what was agreed upon in the Treaty of Kiel, Norway denied being ruled under Sweden and rebelled in a short war known as the Norwegian War of Independence. This would result in a treaty allowing Norway to keep most of its sovereignty while only being loosely held in union with Sweden, until gaining complete independence in 1905.

Denmark–Norways's successful defense of its Dominium maris baltici gathered much attention from surrounding countries since the Baltic Sea was a lucrative trade route. Other powers opposed Denmark – Norway and Sweden's vie for total control of power of the Baltic Sea and would eventually intervene. The rise of the Maritime Powers including Great Britain and the Dutch established a rivalry for power in the Baltic Sea. Archduke Albert of the Habsburgs sought out aid from the Hanseatics in order to challenge the military prowess of King Christian IV.

== In popular memory ==
Although a side-note to the war, the Battle of Kringen, in which Scottish mercenary forces were defeated by Gudbrandsdal militiamen from Lesja, Dovre, Vågå, Fron, Lom, Skjåk and Ringebu is a noted military event in Norway, celebrated to this day.

== See also ==
- Dano–Hanseatic War (1426–35)
