= Gert Rantzau =

German nobleman and soldier in Danish service

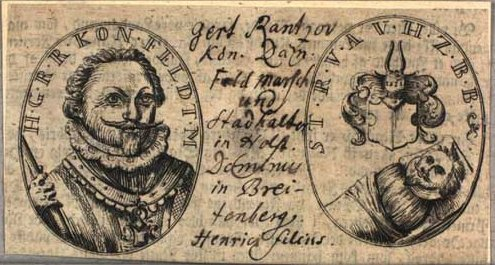
Gert Rantzau

Gert or Gerhard Rantzau (1558-1627) was a German nobleman in Danish service, soldier and Captain of the Palace and Castle of Kronborg and Flensburg.

He was a son of Heinrich Rantzau, the King of Denmark's Lieutenant in Holstein. His older brother was Breide Rantzau.

In the winter of 1581-2 he was sent to Spain as an ambassador to Philip II, offering troops and ships to fight in the Netherlands.

Daniel Rogers, an English diplomat, wrote of him in 1588, "Gerard Rantzow is son to the King's Lieutenant, which Gerard is Constable of the Castle of Kronborg and Captain of the King's Guard, whose like I have not seen for his years in many kingdoms: for being but of the age of 31 years, he has seen the most part of Europe, of Greece, and of Egypt: and speaks 6 languages very well, and is a comely and able gentleman of great spirit." Roger wrote that Rantzau offer to raise soldiers to fight for Queen Elizabeth. Rogers wrote a similar note for Cecil mentioning that Gert Rantzau had been in favour with the late king, Frederick II of Denmark, that he had been in Constantinople and Spain, and visited the English court.

Rantzau like many aristocrats collected signatures. He used the blank leaves of a psalm book for the autographs of James VI of Scotland and Anne of Denmark who stayed at Kronborg in 1590. She signed "Anna Royne d'ecosse" and wrote in French that "Everything was in the hands of God." She wrote the same motto in the autograph book of another guest at Kronborg, Dietrich Bevernest.

Rantzau wrote to the former Scottish ambassador Sir Patrick Vans of Barnbarroch in August 1588 recommending two young travellers in Denmark and Sweden and mentioning Andrew Keith, Lord Dingwall.

In 1590 he became Captain of the Castle of Flensburg, where the Scottish diplomat John Skene visited him and his wife on 1 August 1590.
