= Livonian campaign (1625–1626) =

Swedish campaign into Livonia

- Part of the Polish-Swedish Wars (1621–1625) and (1626–1629)
Date	July 1625–1626
Location	Livonia
Result	Swedish victory
Territorial changes	Swedish forces conquer Livonia

Belligerents
(yes) Swedish Empire	Polish–Lithuanian Commonwealth; Duchy of Courland

Commanders and leaders
(Swedish Empire) Gustavus Adolphus (Swedish Empire) Jacob Duwall (Swedish Empire) Jacob De la Gardie (Swedish Empire) Gustav Horn (Swedish Empire) Carl Gyllenhielm	(Polish–Lithuanian Commonwealth) Stanislaw Sapieha (Polish–Lithuanian Commonwealth) Jan Stanislaw Sapieha (Polish–Lithuanian Commonwealth) Krzysztof Radziwill

Units involved
Unknown	(Polish–Lithuanian Commonwealth) Kokenhusen garrison (Polish–Lithuanian Commonwealth) Birze garrison (Polish–Lithuanian Commonwealth) Dorpat garrison (Polish–Lithuanian Commonwealth) Bauske garrison (Polish–Lithuanian Commonwealth) Mitau garrison

Strength
15,350 men	3,000–4,900 men

Casualties and losses
Minimal	1,200 killed 150 captured

The Livonian campaign was a successful Swedish invasion into Livonia during the Polish–Swedish War (1621–1625) and the start of the Polish–Swedish War (1626–1629). It resulted in the Swedes conquering all of Livonia.

== Background ==
In 1625, after the truce between Sweden and the Commonwealth had ended, and Denmark had been eliminated as a threat to Sweden after their entry into the Thirty Years' War, Gustavus Adolphus, the King of Sweden, decided to conduct a new invasion into Livonia.

The reasoning behind Gustavus' decision was that the Swedes ran into problems gaining acceptable peace terms from the Commonwealth, and it is also likely that Gustavus wished to expand Sweden's borders, at the expense of the Commonwealth.

=== Swedish plan ===
After his decision, Gustavus immediately drew up plans for the invasion. The finalized plan saw three parallel Swedish attacks. Gustavus himself would go against Kokenhusen, which was one of the Commonwealth's most important fortresses in the area. Jacob De la Gardie along with Gustav Horn were to capture Dorpat along with nearby land. Carl Gyllenhielm was tasked with attacking Windau and other Curonian ports.

== Campaign ==
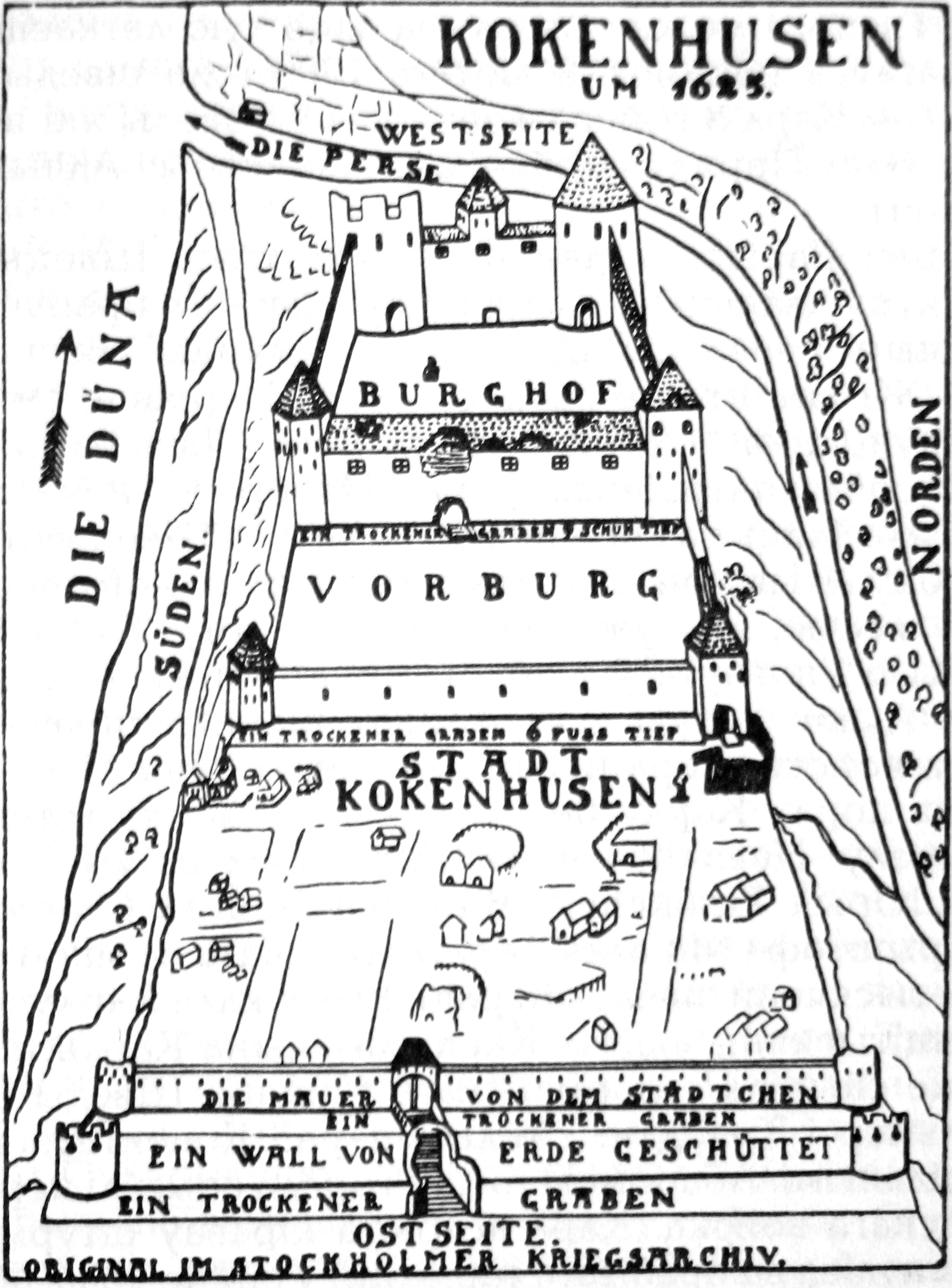
Map of Kokenhusen from 1625

=== 1625 ===
After arriving in Livonia on 28 June, Gustavus immediately split the 15,350 strong Swedish field army into two main expeditionary forces. This is because the plan had been changed on the way, instead making Gyllenhielm the commander of Riga and the attack on Windau was postponed.

Gustavus quickly led the main force, some 9,000 men against Kokenhusen, after arriving on 13 July, the Swedish cannons were brought up to the outer bailey, and on 15 or 25 July, the garrison capitulated to the Swedes. After the capitulation, the Hetman Stanislaw Sapieha met with the Swedish king with 3,000 in battle, where Sapieha was subsequently repulsed and lost all of his guns. After which he continued into the Duchy of Courland where Birze also surrendered to the Swedes on 5 September. Meanwhile, Jacob De la Gardie and Gustav Horn led an expedition of some 4,600 men against Dorpat (modern-day Tartu) which would capitulate on 26 August.

Gustavus stormed Bauske (modern-day Bauska) on 27 September, after which Mitau would subsequently capituate on 4 October. However, Horn, who had in the same month continued southwards with 10 companies of Finnish cavalry and 180 musketeers with the objective of capturing Dünaburg (modern-day Daugavpils), was forced to withdraw after the arrival of reinforcements from the Commonwealth. Moreover, there were reports that a second and larger Commonwealth army under Grand Marshal of Lithuania, Jan Stanislaw Sapieha, was marching into the operations area from the south, in addition to the smaller army under Krzysztof Radziwill that was already operating there.

The winter was unusually hard, and Gustavus decided to risk a battle, probably since he feared that the two Commonwealth armies would unite their forces.

=== 1626 ===
In early 1626, Gustavus ordered those in his army that had received adequate winter clothing out of their winter quarters and across the Duna River in order to carry out a surprise attack on the Commonwealth camp at Wallhof. Gustavus' expeditionary force consisted of some 4,900 men, which included around 2,800 infantry, 2,100 cavalry, and 6 artillery guns. He led a group of the entire cavalry force along with some 1,000 infantry in horse-drawn sledges, with around three to four men in each one, in order to keep up with the cavalry. This incident may have been one of the first times when Gustavus added detached infantry to his cavalry, which subsequently became a standard practice for him. On January 17, he deployed the first group of troops before dawn. He had hoped to carry out a surprise attack, but it was impossible to determine exactly where the Commonwealth units were.

The 3,800–4,900 strong Commonwealth army under Sapieha at first decided to remain in camp, mostly because of poor reconnaissance and because he had been told to avoid battle, yet he still decided to fight, and was unsure of how to proceed. When the Commonwealth army left the camp, they quickly found themselves outnumbered as the remaining Swedish units under Colonel Maximilian Teuffel arrived as well.

After some early skirmishes, the battle commenced, with a charge of the Swedish cavalry on the right wing led by Count Franz Bernhard von Thurn. On the left wing, the Swedish cavaly was led by Horn. Gustavus himself led the centre, which consisted of infantry. In addition to this, other infantry detachments had taken advantage of the nearby woods to construct improvised wooden field defences on certain parts of the battlefield in order to protect themselves against the Polish cavalry. Since the Swedish cavalry was supported by the Swedish infantry on the flanks, the Polish cavalry quickly broke, quickly pursued by their Swedish counterparts. Being abandoned, the Commonwealth infantry also fled.

As a result of the defeat, the Commonwealth suffered 1,200 killed, along with many more during the Swedish pursuit, some 150 were also captured. In comparison, the Swedish losses were minimal.

==== Aftermath of Wallhof ====
Despite his victory, Gustavus remained uncertain about the capability of the Swedish cavalry, the lessons learned from the Battle of Kircholm was still weighing heavily on any assessment of the chances of Swedish cavalry against their Polish counterparts. Although the Swedish cavalry had emerged victorious, only small parts of the hussars had actually attacked, consequently, the battle revealed nothing about the results, or lack thereof, of the new Swedish tactics and training, and Gustavus was not yet ready to trust his cavalry.

== Aftermath ==
Despite his doubts, the Battle of Wallhof was a Swedish victory, and it completed the Swedish conquest of Livonia.

Henceforth, all of Livonia came into Swedish hands, and Gustavus was able to move the war into Polish Prussia, resulting in the Prussian campaign (1626–1629).

== Works cited ==
- Essen, Michael Fredholm von (2020). The Lion from the North: The Swedish Army During the Thirty Years' War. Helion & Company. pp. 36–38. ISBN 9781804511060.
- Sundberg, Ulf (2010). Sveriges krig 1448-1630 [Sweden's wars 1448-1630] (in Swedish). Svenskt militärhistoriskt bibliotek. pp. 310–311. ISBN 9789185789627.
- Sundberg, Ulf (1998). Svenska krig 1521-1814 [Swedish wars 1521-1814] (in Swedish). Stockholm: Hjalmarson & Högberg. pp. 111–112. ISBN 9789189080140.
- Roberts, Michael (1953). Gustavus Adolphus: A History of Sweden, 1611-1632. Longmans, Green. pp. 245–255.
