= Battle of Latarnia =

Battle between the Polish navy and the Swedish army in 1628

Battle of Latarnia/Weichselsmünde
- Part of the Polish–Swedish War (1626–1629) and the Prussian campaign (1626–1629)
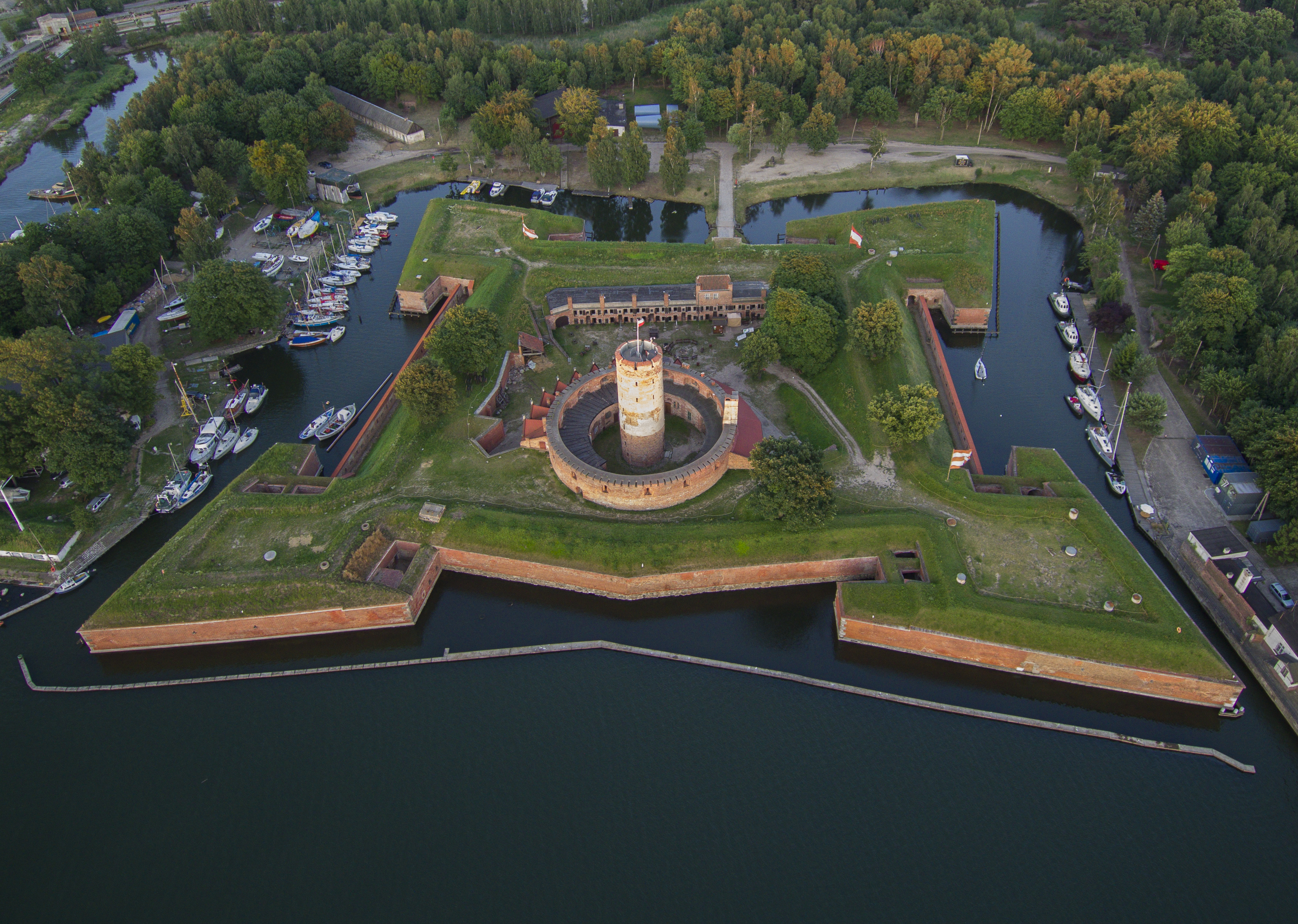
- Fortress at Latarnia
Date	15 July 1628
Location	Latarnia, near Gdańsk
Result	Swedish victory

Belligerents
(yes) Swedish Empire	Polish–Lithuanian Commonwealth; Danzig

Commanders and leaders
(yes) Gustavus Adolphus (yes) Patrick Hume †	

Units involved
(yes) Alexander von Essen’s Finnish infantry regiment (yes) Swedish Army (yes) Eight cavalry companies	Polish–Lithuanian Commonwealth Commonwealth navy

Strength
Around 1,000 men 25 artillery	12–15 warships

Casualties and losses
12 killed	3 warships sunk Majority of the fleet damaged

The Battle of Latarnia (Note: Polish: Bitwa pod Latarnią) or Weichselsmünde (Note: Swedish: Slaget vid Weichselsmünde) was a surprise attack by Swedish artillery on a Polish fleet stationed outside Danzig at Weichselsmünde in 1628.

== Background ==
On May 15, 1628, Gustavus Adolphus returned to Pillau with reinforcements for the Swedish army, at this point around 12,000 men were in Gustavus' army. He went to Gdańsk Head, where he awaited Axel Oxenstierna, one of his top advisors. Gustavus wanted to invade Lithuania, but Axel advised him not to, stating: "där kommer hans majestät avsides i världen." which roughly translates to: "There his majesty would get secluded from the world."

== Battle ==
On July 15, Gustavus decided on a surprise attack on Danzig, and Gustavus himself led a force of 25 leather cannons, which had excellent mobility. He brought it over a swamp that the Poles deemed impossible to cross. After this, a 6-hour-long battle between the Swedish Army and the Commonwealth fleet began. The Commonwealth fleet suffered heavy casualties, with most ships being heavily damaged and 3 of the Commonwealth's ships being destroyed, including the admiral ship. However, the rest of the fleet managed to retreat back into Danzig, and heavy rain would prevent the fleet from suffering further damage. The Swedes lost 12 soldiers, along with a company commander by the name of Patrick Hume.

== Aftermath ==
Through this action, Gustavus had hoped to force Danzig into signing a treaty of neutrality, but this didn't happen.
