= Gustavus Adolphus =

King of Sweden from 1611 to 1632

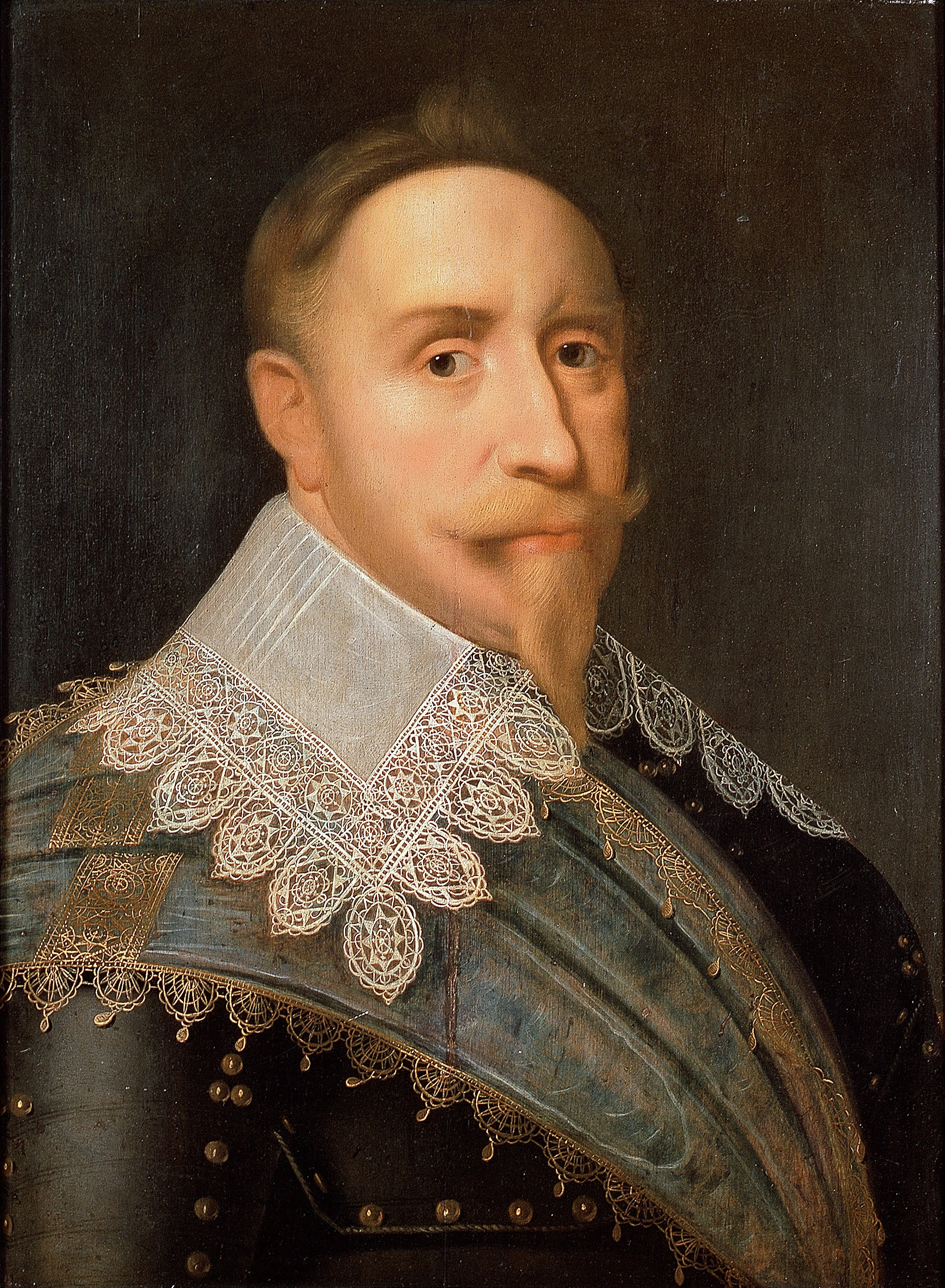
- Portrait attributed to Jacob Hoefnagel, 1624

King of Sweden
- Reign: 30 October 1611 – 6 November 1632
- Coronation: 12 October 1617
- Predecessor: Charles IX
- Successor: Christina
- Born: 9 December 1594; Castle Tre Kronor, Sweden
- Died: 6 November 1632 (aged 37) near Lützen, Electorate of Saxony, Holy Roman Empire
- Burial: 22 June 1634; Riddarholmen Church, Stockholm
- Spouse: Maria Eleonora of Brandenburg (m. 1620)
- Issue: Christina, Queen of Sweden; Illegitimate: Gustav of Vasaborg
- House: Vasa
- Father: Charles IX of Sweden
- Mother: Christina of Holstein-Gottorp
- Religion: Lutheran
- Military career
- Allegiance: Sweden
- Branch: Swedish Army
- Conflicts: Treelike list: Kalmar War; Storming of Kristianopel; Reconquest of Öland; Battle of Vittsjö; Christian IV's naval expedition to Stockholm; Ingrian War; Siege of Gdov; Siege of Pskov (1615); Polish–Swedish War (1617–1618); Livonian campaign (1617–1618); Polish–Swedish War (1621–1625); Siege of Riga (1621); Livonian campaign (1625–1626); Polish–Swedish War (1626–1629); Prussian campaign (1626–1629); Battle of Wallhof; Battle of Gniew; Battle of Dirschau; Battle of Trzciana; Battle of Weichselsmünde; Thirty Years' War; Assault on Greifenhagen; Battle of Frankfurt an der Oder; Battle of Werben; Battle of Breitenfeld (1631); Battle of Rain; Siege of Nuremberg; Battle of the Alte Veste; Battle of Lützen (1632) †

Gustavus Adolphus (9 December (N.S. 19 December) 1594 – 6 November (N.S. 16 November) 1632), also known as Gustav II Adolf or Gustav II Adolph, was King of Sweden from 1611 to 1632. He is credited with the rise of Sweden as a great European power (Swedish: Stormaktstiden). During his reign, Sweden became one of the primary military forces in Europe during the Thirty Years' War, helping to determine the political and religious balance of power in Europe. He was formally and posthumously given the name Gustavus Adolphus the Great (Swedish: Gustav Adolf den store; Latin: Gustavus Adolphus Magnus) by the Riksdag of the Estates in 1634.

He is often regarded as one of the greatest military commanders in modern history, with use of an early form of combined arms. His most notable military victory was the Battle of Breitenfeld in 1631. With his resources, logistics, and support, Gustavus Adolphus was positioned to become a major European leader, but he was killed a year later at the Battle of Lützen. He was assisted in his efforts by Count Axel Oxenstierna, the Lord High Chancellor of Sweden, who also acted as regent after his death.

Coming to the throne at the age of 16, Gustavus Adolphus inherited three wars from his father Charles IX of Sweden: conflicts with Russia and Denmark–Norway, and a dynastic struggle with his first cousin, King Sigismund III Vasa of Poland. Of these, the Danish war was the most serious. During his reign, Sweden rose from the status of a Baltic Sea basin regional power to one of the great powers of Europe and a model of early modern era government. Gustavus Adolphus is known as the "father of modern warfare", or the first modern general. Gustavus Adolphus was the main figure responsible for the success of Swedish arms during the Thirty Years' War and led his nation to great prestige. As a general, Gustavus Adolphus employed mobile artillery on the battlefield, as well as very aggressive tactics, where attack was stressed over defense, and mobility and cavalry initiative were emphasized. He taught a number of other military commanders, such as Lennart Torstensson, who would go on to expand the boundaries and power of the Swedish Empire after Gustavus Adolphus's death. Spoils meant he became a successful bookraider in Europe, targeting Jesuit library collections.

His contributions to Sweden's rise in power included reformation of the administrative structure. For example, he began parish registration of the population, so that the central government could more efficiently tax and conscript the people. He is also widely commemorated by Protestants in Europe as the main defender of their cause during the Thirty Years' War, with multiple churches, foundations and other undertakings named after him, including the Gustav-Adolf-Werk. His involvement in the Thirty Years' War gave rise to the nickname "the Lion from the North".

== Early life ==
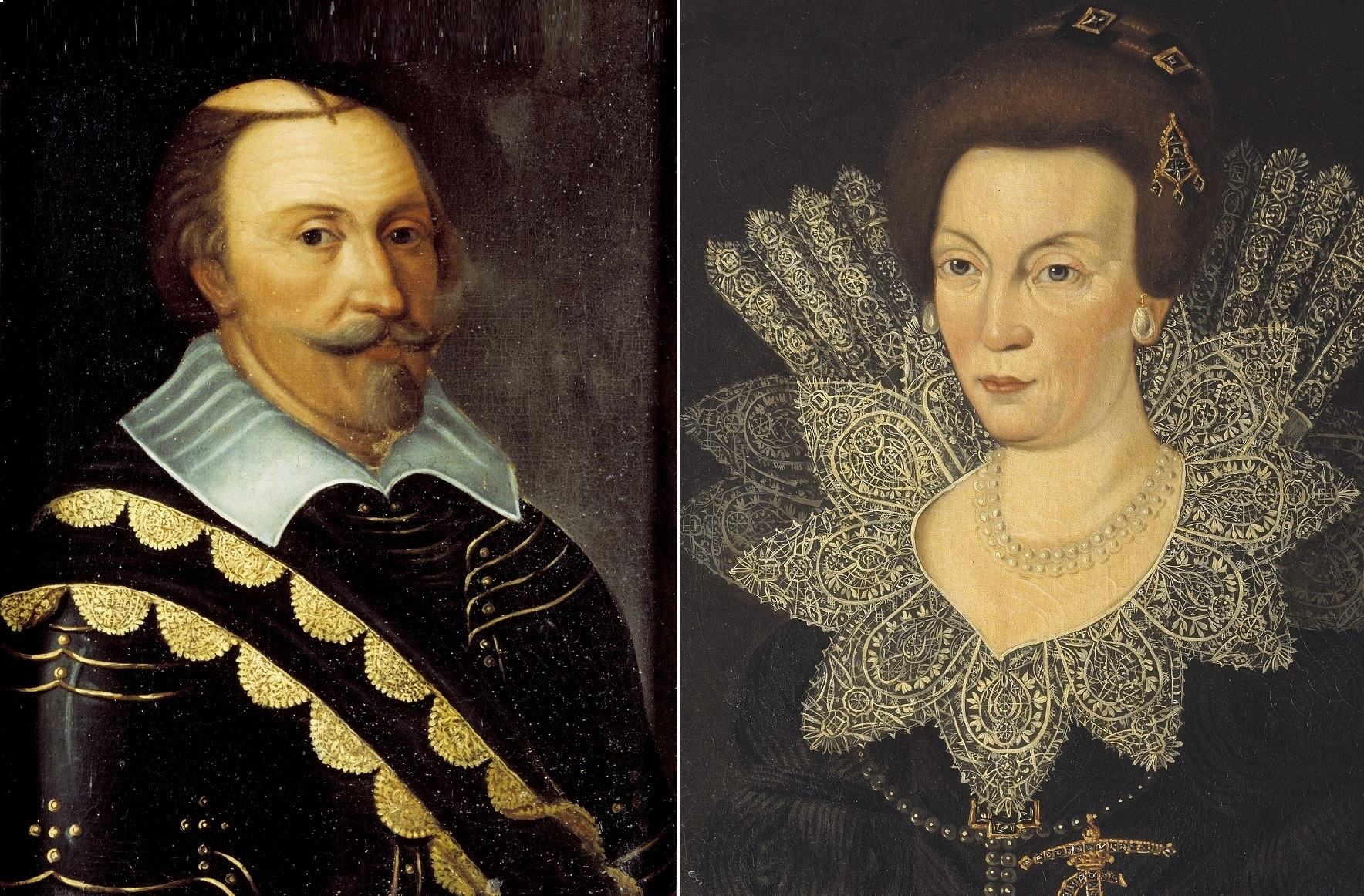
Gustav Adolf's parents, King Charles IX and Queen Christina

Gustavus Adolphus was born in Stockholm on 9 December 1594, eldest son of Duke Charles of the House of Vasa and his second wife, Christina of Holstein-Gottorp. At the time, his cousin Sigismund was both King of Sweden and Poland. Charles engaged a prominent Swedish intellectual, Johan Skytte, as Gustavus's tutor. His studies included history, politics, law, military training and languages, including Swedish and German, as well as some Latin, French, Dutch and Italian. In 1599, his father, the Protestant Duke Charles, fought a war against the Catholic King Sigismund III Vasa (King of Poland-Lithuania and Sweden) to abandon the throne of Sweden. This war was part of the preliminary religious strife before the Thirty Years' War, and Charles reigned as regent before taking the throne as Charles IX of Sweden in 1604. Crown Prince Gustav Adolph was granted Gagnef-Floda in Dalecarlia as a duchy from 1610.

Upon his father's death in October 1611, a 16-year-old Gustavus inherited the throne although the Swedish Riksdag declared he could not formally be crowned King until he reached the age of 24. The Swedish Statesman Axel Oxenstierna acted as regent briefly until Gustavus was declared of age and able to reign himself at age seventeen in January 1612. He also inherited an ongoing succession of occasionally belligerent dynastic disputes with his Polish cousin, Sigismund III, who persisted in his effort to regain the Swedish throne. He also briefly assumed the title of tsar of Russia in the beginning of his reign.

== King of Sweden ==
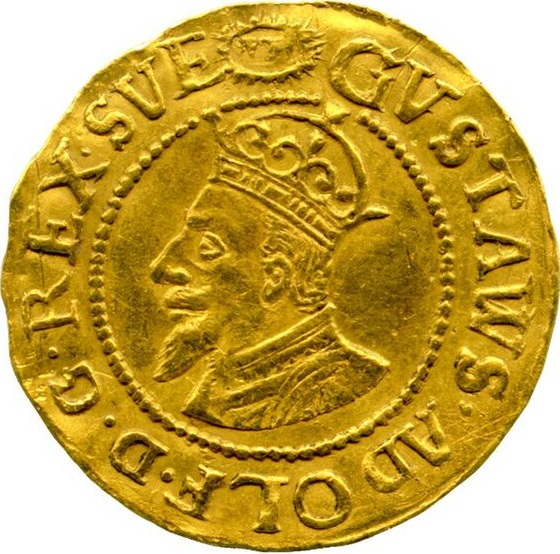
Gold coin of King Gustav Adolph, 1632

Gustavus Adolphus inherited three wars from his father when he ascended the throne: against Denmark–Norway, which had attacked Sweden earlier in 1611; against Russia, due to Sweden having tried to take advantage of the Russian Time of Troubles; and against Poland-Lithuania, due to King Charles's having deposed King Sigismund III, his nephew, as King of Sweden.

During the war against Denmark–Norway (Kalmar War), Gustavus Adolphus fought in minor military actions including the victorious for Sweden Storming of Kristianopel and the unsuccessful Battle of Vittsjö. Gustavus Adolphus let his soldiers plunder towns and villages, and as he met little resistance from Danish forces in Scania, they pillaged and devastated twenty-four Scanian parishes. His reputation in Scania has been negative because of these actions. The largest destroyed settlement was the town Væ. The war was concluded in 1613 with a peace that did not cost Sweden any territory except for Älvsborg Castle, which Sweden had to pay to get back, but it was forced to pay a heavy indemnity to Denmark–Norway (Treaty of Knäred).

The war against Russia (Ingrian War) marked Gustavus Adolphus's involvement in the successful Siege of Gdov and the failed Siege of Pskov and ended in 1617 with the Treaty of Stolbovo, which excluded Russia from the Baltic Sea.

The final inherited war, the war against Poland, ended in 1629 with the Truce of Altmark, which transferred the large province of Livonia to Sweden and freed the Swedish forces for the subsequent intervention in the Thirty Years' War in Germany, where Swedish forces had already established a bridgehead in 1628. In a round of this dynastic dispute, Gustavus Adolphus invaded Livonia when he was 31, beginning the Polish-Swedish War. In the course of it he won a victory at Wallhof, fought at Gniew, Dirschau, and suffered a defeat at Trzciana. In April 1627, he was made a knight of the Order of the Garter by King Charles I of England.

=== Thirty Years' War ===
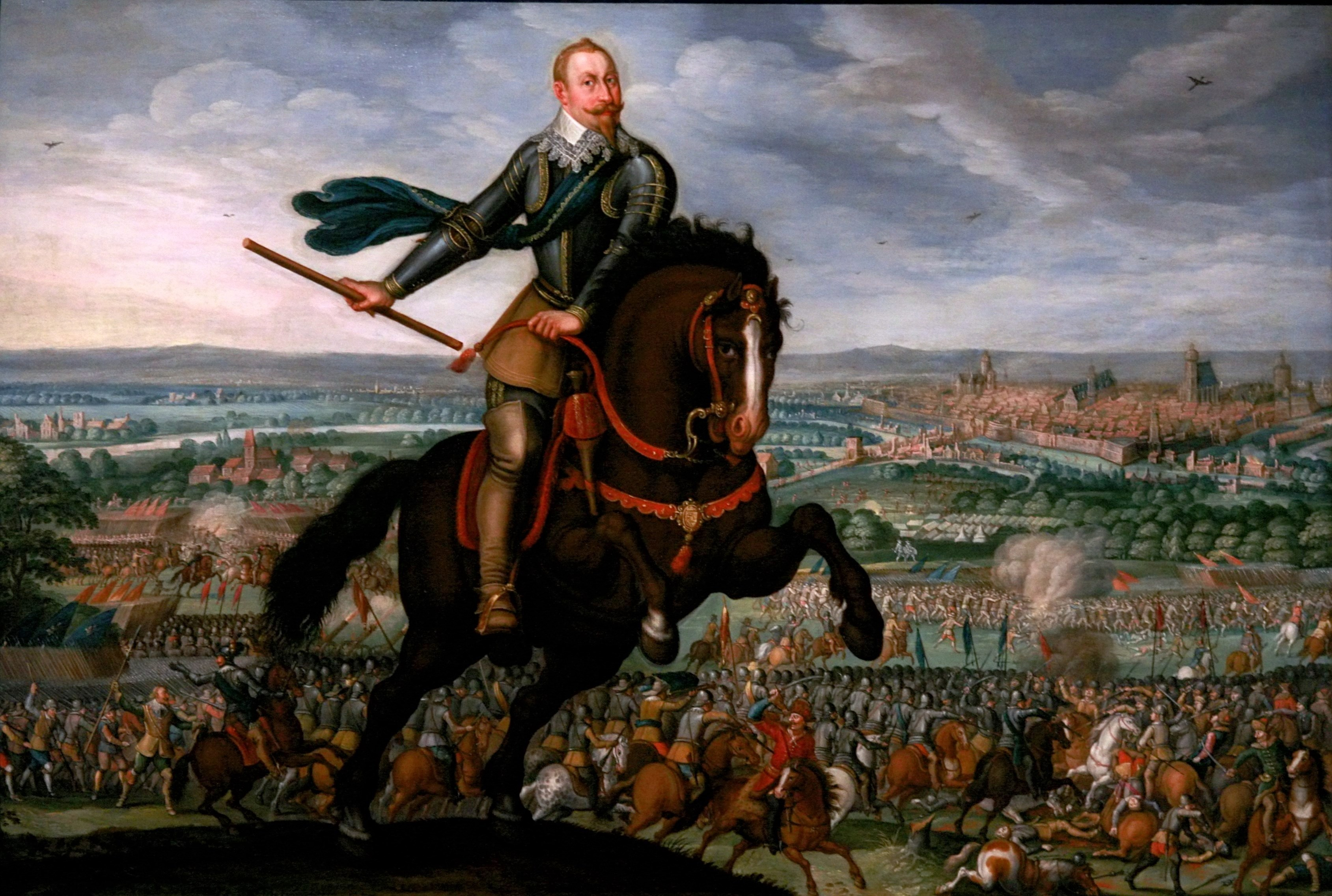
Gustavus Adolphus at Breitenfeld in 1631

The electorate of Brandenburg was especially torn apart by a quarrel between the Protestant and Catholic parties. The Brandenburg minister and diplomat baron Samuel von Winterfeld influenced Gustavus Adolphus to support and protect the Protestant side in Germany. As a result of these negotiations, Gustavus Adolphus launched an invasion of northern Germany and Pomerania in June 1630, marking the Swedish intervention in the Thirty Years' War. He had just 4,000 troops. He was soon able to consolidate the Protestant position in the north, however, using reinforcements from Sweden and money supplied by France at the Treaty of Bärwalde. Gustavus Adolphus intervened on the anti-Imperial side, which at the time was losing to the Holy Roman Empire and its Catholic allies; the Swedish forces would quickly reverse that situation. His occupation of Pomerania was carried out according to the Treaty of Stettin (1630). On 25 December 1630, he led an assault on Greifenhagen, resulting in the capture of the city.

After Swedish plundering in Brandenburg (1631) endangered the system of retrieving war contributions from occupied territories, "marauding and plundering" by Swedish soldiers was prohibited. Meanwhile, a Catholic army under Johann Tserclaes, Count of Tilly was laying waste to Saxony. Gustavus Adolphus met Tilly's army and won a decisive victory at the First Battle of Breitenfeld on 17 September 1631. At Breitenfield, Gustavus Adolphus led a larger force against the Imperialist army and made use of a combined attack of cavalry, well-disciplined infantry and the effect of the more numerous and more mobile Swedish artillery to break the Imperial lines. The battle established Gustavus Adolphus as the leading general of the Thirty Years' war and helped shape the narrative for a new period of definitive warfare, involving coordinated artillery attack. He then marched across Germany, establishing his winter quarters near the Rhine, making plans for the invasion of the rest of the Holy Roman Empire.

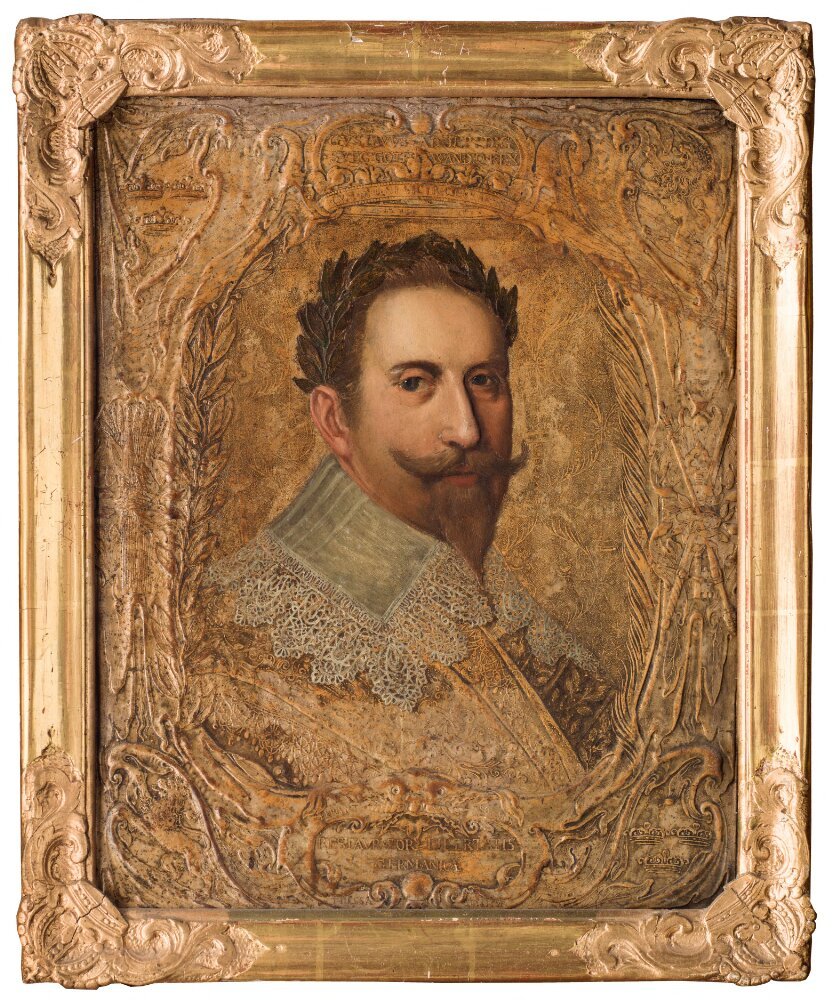
Portrait by Servatius de Kock from 1632

In March 1632, Gustavus Adolphus invaded Bavaria, an ally of the Emperor. He forced the withdrawal of his Catholic opponents at the Battle of Rain, marking the high point of the campaign. At Rain, Gustavus Adolphus led an army of 37,500 soldiers against a smaller army commanded by Count Tilly at a site near the Lech River. Tilly's forces were entrenched on the eastern bank of the river. Gustavus Adolphus ordered a sustained artillery bombardment and smoke as cover for his forces to cross the river, along with the use of a prefabricated temporary bridge. At the same time, the Swedish cavalry arrived on the eastern side, having crossed further to the south. Tilly was severely wounded while his army was attacked on both flanks and as a result, the imperial forces were devastated and subsequently retreated, giving Gustavus Adolphus a clear victory and enabling his army to invade Bavaria. Munich fell to his forces on 17 May 1632.

In the summer of that year, he sought a political solution that would preserve the existing structure of states in Germany, while guaranteeing the security of its Protestants. But achieving these objectives depended on his continued success on the battlefield. Some other military actions in the Thirty Years' War with Gustavus Adolphus at the head were: the victorious battles of Frankfurt an der Oder and Werben, the botched Siege of Nuremberg, the Battle of Fürth, and the unfavourable Battle of the Alte Veste. At Alte Veste, Gustavus Adolphus led some 56,000 troops to battle against some 70,000 Imperial and Bavarian troops but was defeated and forced to withdraw northwards.

Gustavus Adolphus is reported to have entered battle without wearing any armor, proclaiming, "The Lord God is my protector!" However, it is more likely that he simply wore a padded cuirass rather than going into battle wearing no battle protection whatsoever. In 1627, near Dirschau in Prussia, a Polish soldier shot him in the right side of the neck almost in his throat. The bullet made its way into the muscles above and behind his right shoulder blade. Though he was initially convinced the wound was fatal he survived, but the doctors could not remove the bullet, so from that point on, he could not wear iron armor and two fingers of his right hand were paralyzed. Gustavus Adolphus would suffer the effects of the wounds for the rest of his life. Among the minor effects were on his handwriting. Due to the bullet wound, the plate cuirass (normally worn by important officers at that time) was replaced by a buff coat made of moose hide, which would have serious consequences later.

Among his innovations as a military commander during this time, he installed an early form of combined arms in his formations, where the cavalry could attack from the safety of an infantry line reinforced by cannon, and retire again within to regroup after their foray. Inspired by the reform of Maurice of Nassau, he adopted much shallower infantry formations than were common in the pike and shot armies of the era, with formations typically fighting in 5 or 6 ranks, occasionally supported at some distance by another such formation—the gaps being the provinces of the artillery and cavalry as noted above. His artillery were themselves different—in addition to the usual complements of heavy cannon, he introduced light mobile guns for the first time into the Renaissance battlefield. These were grouped in batteries supporting his more linearly deployed formations, replacing the cumbersome and unmaneuverable traditional deep squares (such as the Spanish tercios that were up to 50 ranks deep) used in other pike and shot armies of the day. In consequence, his forces could redeploy and reconfigure very rapidly, confounding his enemies. He created the modern Swedish Navy, which transported troops and supplies to the Continental battlefront. Pikemen could shoot—if not as accurately as those designated musketeers—so a valuable firearm could be kept in the firing line. His infantrymen and gunners were taught to ride, if needed. Napoleon thought highly of the achievement and copied the tactics. However, recent historians have challenged his reputation. B. H. Liddell Hart says it is an exaggeration to credit him with a uniquely disciplined conscript army, or call his the first military state to fight a protracted war on the continent. He argues that he improved existing techniques and used them brilliantly. Richard Brzezinski says his legendary status was based on inaccurate myths created by later historians. Many of his innovations were developed by his senior staff.

=== Political philosophy ===
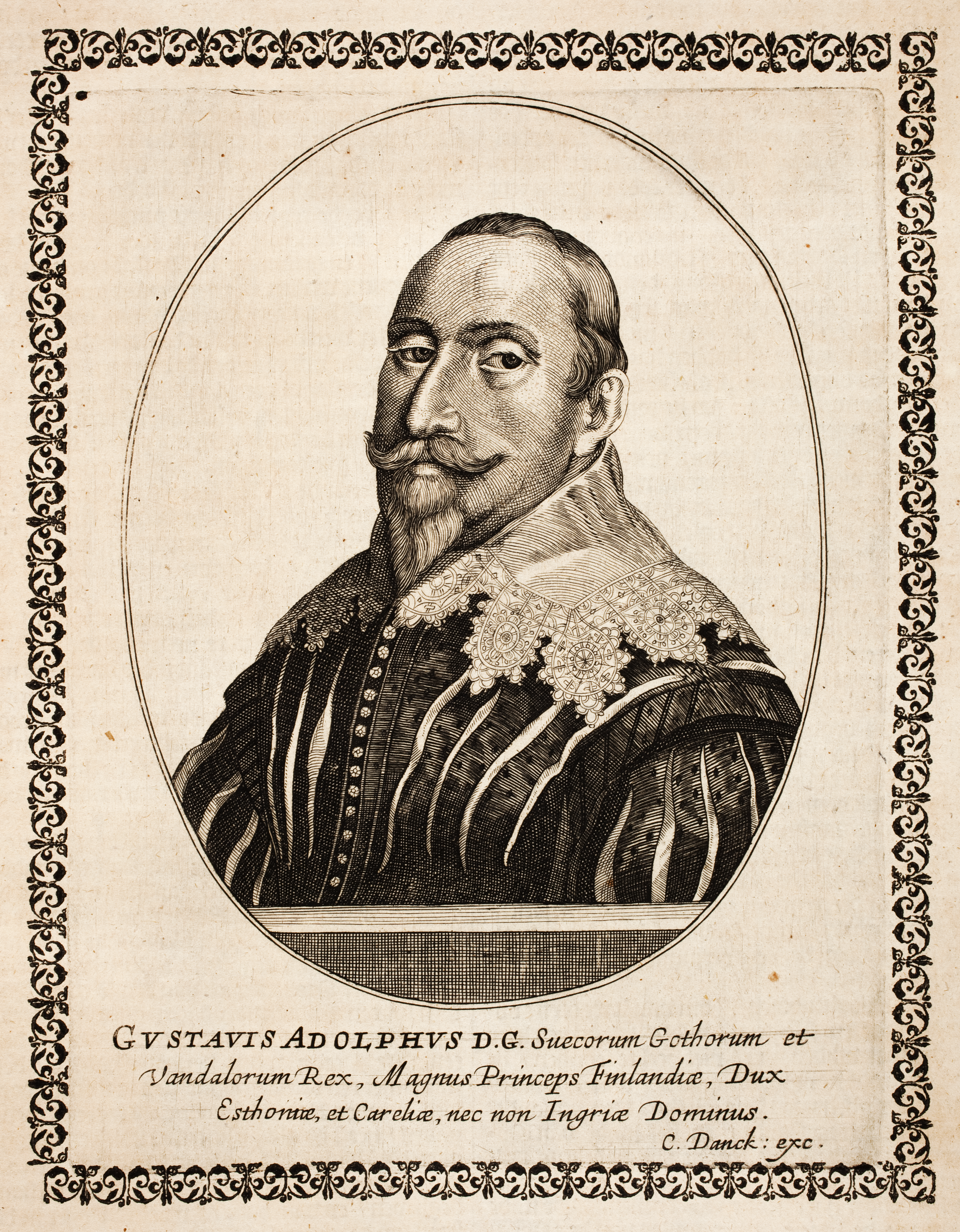
Engraving of Gustavus Adolphus

Gustavus Adolphus's politics also show progressive tendencies: for example, in 1631, in the conquered territory of Estonia he forced the local nobility into granting more individual rights to the commoners. He also encouraged education, opening a school in Tallinn in 1631, today known as Gustav Adolf Grammar School (Estonian: Gustav Adolfi Gümnaasium). On 30 June 1632, Gustavus Adolphus signed the decree for the foundation of Academia Dorpatensis in Estonia, today known as the University of Tartu.

Despite significant hardships for the common people, the period of Swedish rule over Estonia has been idealized in local folklore as the "good old Swedish times", which has been attributed to comparisons with the harder times that followed under the Russian rule.

On 27 August 1617, his speech before his coronation included the following statement:

I had carefully learned to understand, about that experience which I could have upon things of rule, how fortune is failing or great, subject to such rule in common, so that otherwise I would have had scant reason to desire such a rule, had I not found myself obliged to it through God's bidding and nature. Now it was of my acquaintance, that inasmuch as God had let me be born a prince, such as I then am born, then my good and my destruction were knotted into one with the common good; for every reason then, it was now my promise that I should take great pains about their well-being and good governance and management, and thereabout bear close concern.

== Death and aftermath ==
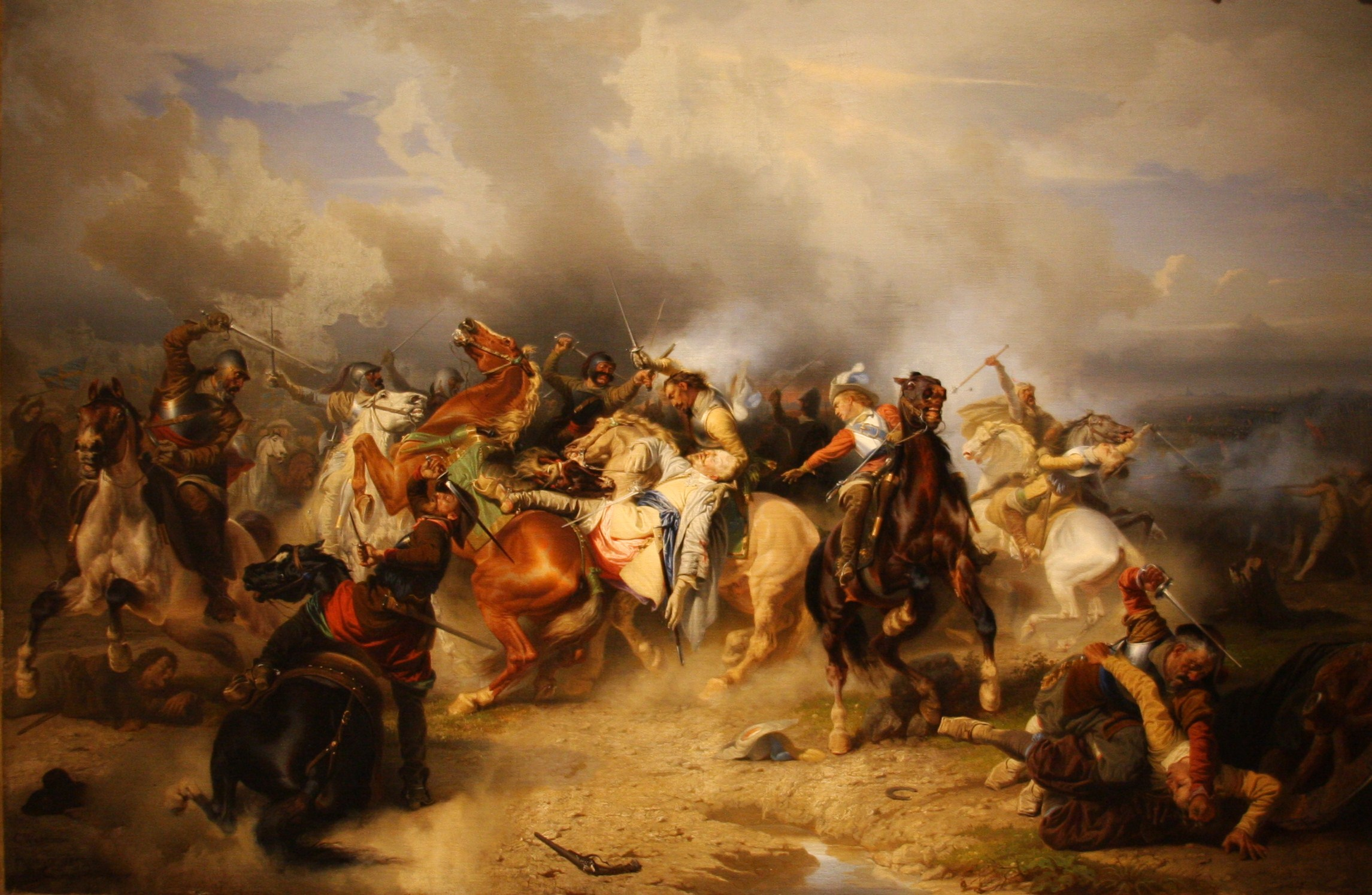
Death of Gustavus Adolphus at Lützen by Carl Wahlbom (1855)

Streiff, the taxidermied warhorse of Gustavus Adolphus, displayed at Livrustkammaren in Stockholm.

On 6 November 1632, Gustavus Adolphus encountered the Imperial Army under Albrecht von Wallenstein at Lützen, in what would prove to be one of the most significant battles of the Thirty Years' War. Gustavus Adolphus was killed when, at a crucial point in the battle, he was leading a cavalry charge on his wing. Towards 1:00 pm, on a field covered by a thick mix of gun smoke, fog and smoke from the burning town of Lützen, the king was separated from his fellow riders and suffered multiple shots. A bullet crushed his left arm below the elbow. Almost simultaneously his horse suffered a shot to the neck that made it hard to control. The king rode astray behind enemy lines. There he sustained yet another shot in the back, was stabbed and fell from his horse. Lying on the ground, he received a final, fatal shot to the temple. His fate remained unknown for some time. However, when the gunnery paused and the smoke cleared, his horse was spotted between the two lines, Gustavus Adolphus himself not on it and nowhere to be seen. His disappearance stopped the initiative of the hitherto successful Swedish right wing, while a search was conducted. His partly stripped body was found an hour or two later, and evacuated from the field in a Swedish artillery wagon.

As late as the 19th century several stories were retold about Gustav Adolphus's death. In most of them the assassin was named as Prince Francis Albert of Saxe-Lauenburg, who was next to the king on the occasion and was thought to be acting on behalf of the enemy. When King Charles XII of Sweden was shown purported evidence in 1707 he dismissed the theory out of doubt that "any prince could be so ungrateful".

Lützen was a victory for the Protestants, but cost them their leader, which caused their campaign to lose direction and finally suffer a crushing defeat at Nördlingen.

In February 1633, the Riksdag of the Estates gave him the posthumous title "Gustavus Adolphus the Great", the only Swedish monarch to be thus honoured. As those Vasa princes who descended from deposed monarchs were excluded from the throne and Gustavus Adolphus's younger brother had died ten years before, his young daughter Christina became his successor, with Maria Eleonora and other ministers governing on her behalf. He left one other known child, his illegitimate son Gustav, Count of Vasaborg.

== Legacy ==
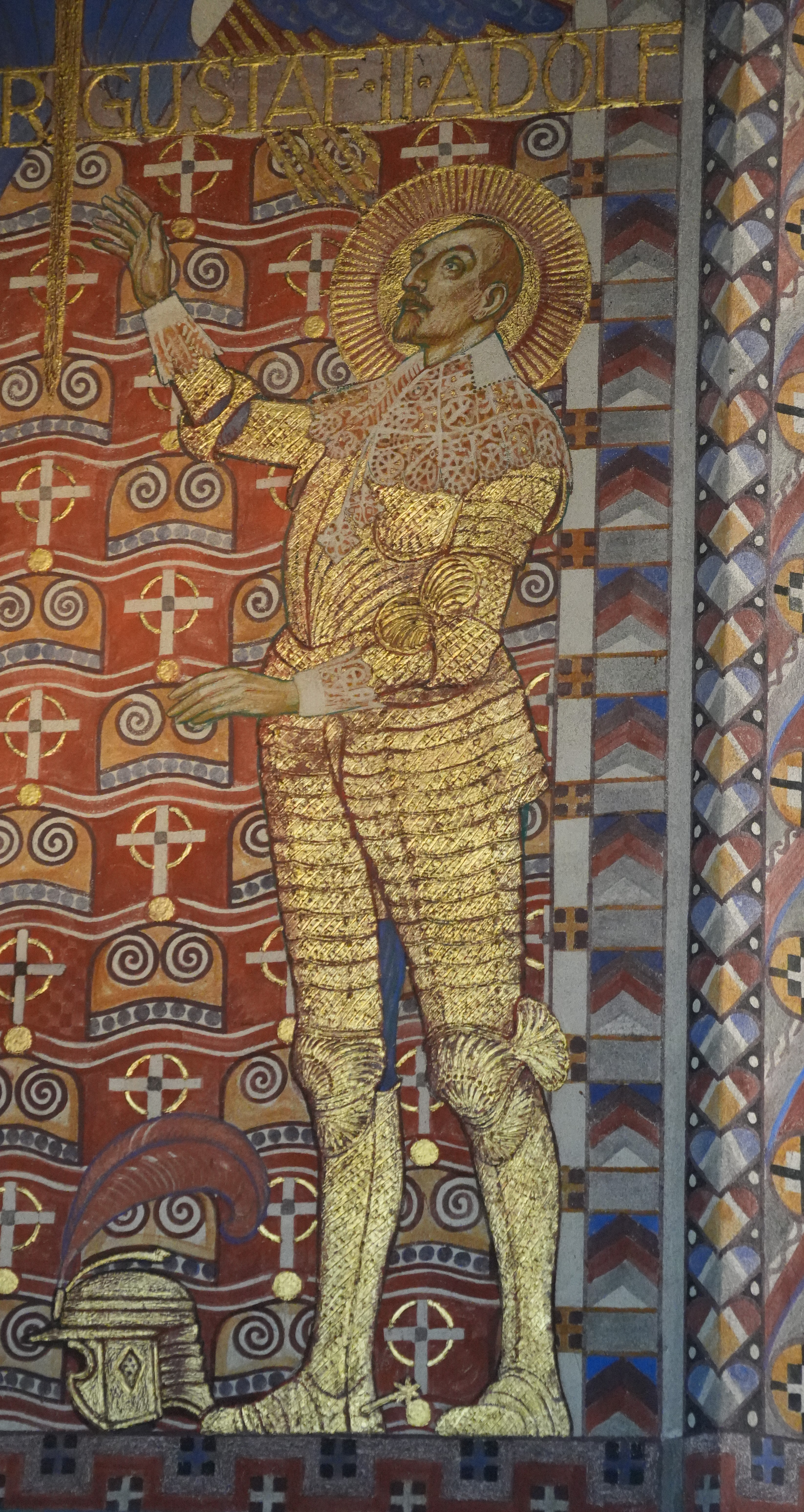
Gustavus Adolphus depicted with a halo on a wallpainting in the Church of the Revelation in Saltsjöbaden, Sweden.

Gustavus Adolphus is widely commemorated by Protestants in Europe as the main defender of their cause during the Thirty Years' War, with multiple churches, foundations and other undertakings named after him. He became a symbol of Swedish pride, and his name is attached to city squares in major Swedish cities like Stockholm, Gothenburg and Helsingborg. Gustavus Adolphus Day is celebrated in Sweden each year on 6 November, the day the king died at Lützen and of the traditions on this day is the production and consumption of Gustavus Adolphus pastry. In Finland, the same day is celebrated as "Finnish Swedish Heritage Day". Gustavus Adolphus College, a Lutheran college in St. Peter, Minnesota, is also named for him.

The Gustav-Adolf-Werk (GAW) of the Evangelical Church in Germany, founded on the bicentennial celebration of the Battle of Lützen, has as its object the aid of other churches and commemorates Gustavus Adolphus's legacy. It is responsible for taking care of the Diaspora work of the EKD and has separate branches internationally. The organization in Austria is called the Gustav-Adolf-Verein. The project of forming such a society was first broached in connection with the bicentennial celebration of the Battle of Lützen on 6 November 1832.

A proposal to collect funds for a monument to Gustavus Adolphus was agreed to, and it was suggested by Superintendent Grossmann that the best memorial to Gustavus Adolphus would be the formation of a union for propagating his ideas. It quickly gained popularity in Germany. The lack of political correctness received some criticism; however, the organization used GAW as its brand in the meanwhile. The Swedish royal family visited the GAW headquarters in Leipzig on the 400th birthday of Gustavus Adolphus, in 1994.

=== Evaluations ===
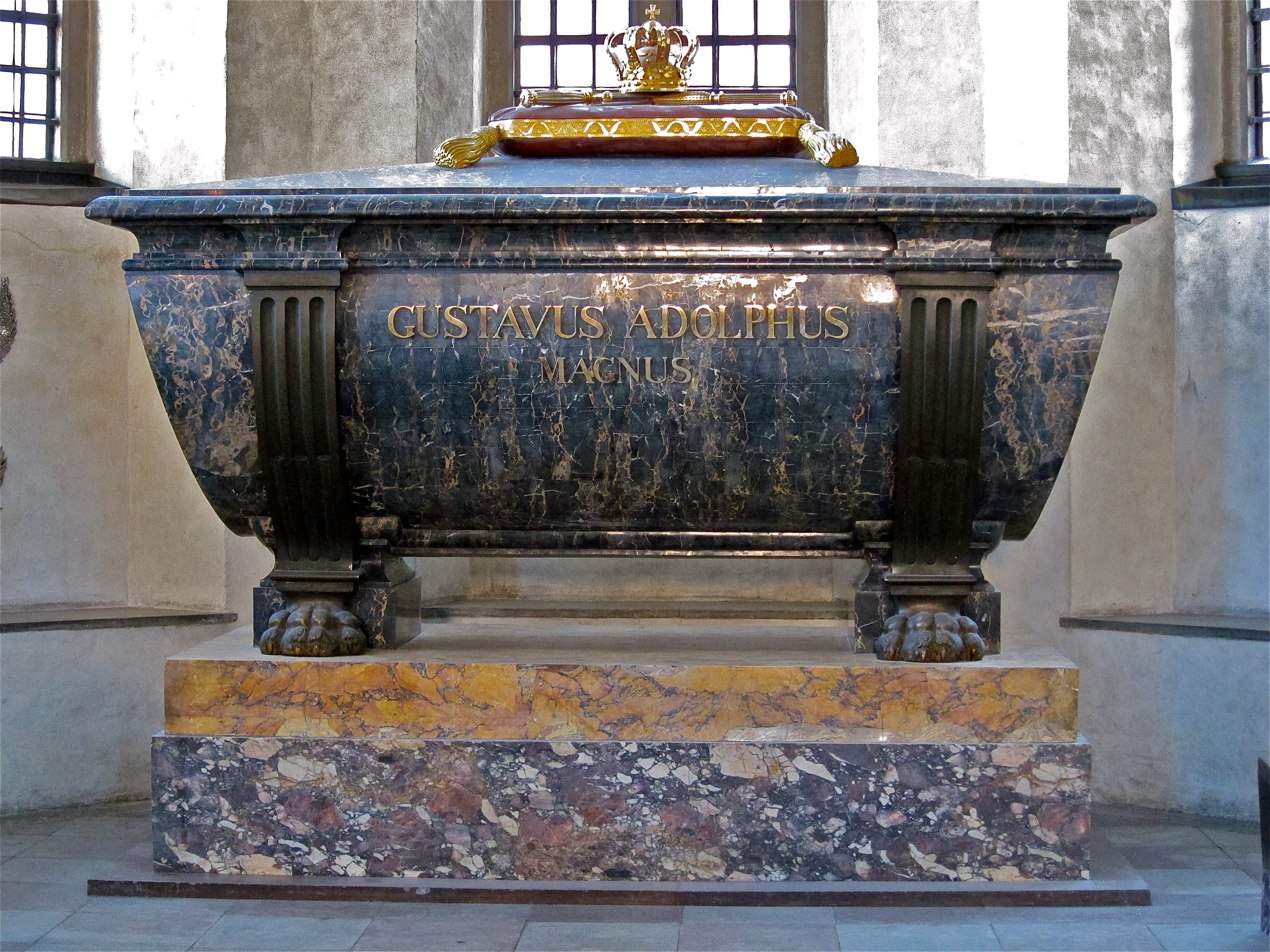
Gustavus Adolphus's sarcophagus at Riddarholmen Church

Historian Ronald S. Love wrote that in 1560–1660 there were "a few innovators, notably Maurice of Nassau and Gustavus Adolphus of Sweden, whom many scholars credit with revolutionary developments in warfare and with having laid the foundations of military practice for the next two centuries." Scholars consider him an extremely able military commander. His integration of infantry, cavalry, logistics, and particularly his use of artillery, earned him the title of the "Father of Modern Warfare".

Carl von Clausewitz and Napoleon Bonaparte considered him one of the greatest generals of all time, an evaluation agreed with by George S. Patton and others. He was also renowned for his constancy of purpose and the equality of his troops—no one part of his armies was considered better or received preferred treatment, as was common in other armies where the cavalry were the elite, followed by the artillery, and both disdained the lowly infantry. In Gustavus Adolphus's army the units were extensively cross-trained. Both cavalry and infantry could service the artillery, as his heavy cavalry did when turning captured artillery on the opposing Catholic tercios at First Breitenfeld. His advancements in warfare helped make Sweden the dominant Baltic power for the next hundred years (see Swedish Empire). He is also the only Swedish monarch to be styled "the Great".

The Columbia Encyclopedia sums up his record:

In military organization and strategy, Gustavus (sic) was ahead of his time. While most powers relied on mercenary troops, he organized a national standing army that distinguished itself by its discipline and relatively high moral standards. Deeply religious, the king desired his soldiers to behave like a truly Christian army; his stern measures against the common practices of looting, raping, and torture were effective until his death. His successes were due to this discipline, his use of small, mobile units, the superiority of his firearms, and his personal charisma. Although he was deeply interested in the internal progress of his kingdom, much of the credit for the development of Swedish industry and the fiscal and administrative reforms of his reign belongs to Oxenstierna.

The German Socialist Franz Mehring wrote a biography of Gustavus Adolphus with a Marxist perspective on the actions of the Swedish king during the Thirty Years' War. In it, he makes a case that the war was fought over economics and trade rather than religion. The Swedes discovered huge deposits of copper, which were used to build brass cannon. The cottage-industrial growth stimulated an armaments industry.

In his book "Ofredsår" ("Years of Warfare"), the Swedish historian and author Peter Englund argues that there was probably no single all-important reason for the king's decision to go to war. Instead, it was likely a combination of religious, security, as well as economic considerations. This view is supported by German historian Johannes Burkhardt, who writes that Gustavus Adolphus entered the 30 Years War exactly 100 years after the publication of the Confessio Augustana, the core confession of faith of the Lutheran Church, and let himself be praised as its saviour. Yet Gustavus Adolphus's own "manifesto of war" does not mention any religious motivations at all but speaks of political and economic reasons.

Sweden would have to maintain its integrity in the face of several provocations and aggressions by the Habsburg Empire. The manifesto was written by scholar Johann Adler Salvius in a style common of the time that promotes a "just war". Burkhardt argues that traditional Swedish historiography constructed a defensive interest in security out of that by taking the manifesto's text for granted. But to defend Stockholm, the occupation of the German Baltic territories would have been an extreme advance and the imperial Baltic Sea fleet mentioned as a threat in the manifesto had never reached more than a quarter of the size of the Swedish fleet. Moreover, it was never maintained to challenge Sweden but to face the separatist Netherlands. So if ruling the Baltic Sea was a goal of Swedish strategy, the conquests in Germany were not a defensive war but an act of expansion. From Swedish Finland, Gustavus Adolphus advanced along the Baltic Sea coast and eventually to Augsburg and Munich and he even urged the Swiss Confederacy to join him. This was no longer about Baltic interests but the imperial capital of Vienna and the alpine passes that were now in close reach of the Swedish army.

Burkhardt points out that the Gothic legacy of the Swedes, coalesced as a political program. The Swedish king was also "Rex Gotorum" (Latin: King of the Goths), and the list of kings was traced back to the Gothic rulers to construct continuity. Prior to his embarkment to northern Germany, Gustavus Adolphus urged the Swedish nobility to follow the example of conquests set by their Gothic ancestors. Had he lived longer, it would have been likely that Gustavus Adolphus would have reached for the imperial crown of the Holy Roman Empire.

=== Memorials and cultural references ===
Franz Berwald composed the choral work Gustaf Adolf den stores seger och död vid Lützen, first performed on 11 November 1845 at Storkyrkan in Stockholm. Max Bruch's oratorio Gustav Adolf, Op. 73, was composed in 1897–98 with a libretto by Albert Hackenberg and first performed on 22 May 1898 in Barmen, with the character of Gustav Adolf, King of Sweden, written for baritone.

== Issue ==
Gustavus Adolphus was married to Maria Eleonora of Brandenburg, (Note: See Wedding of Gustav II Adolf and Maria Eleonora.) the daughter of John Sigismund, Elector of Brandenburg, and chose the Prussian city of Elbing as the base for his operations in Germany.

| Name | Born | Died | Notes |
|---|---|---|---|
(Illegitimate) By Margareta Slots
| Gustav | 24 May 1616; Stockholm | 25 October 1653; Wildeshausen | Married Countess Anna Sofia Wied-Runkel and had issue, buried in Riddarholmskyrkan. |
By Maria Eleonora of Brandenburg (11 November 1599 – 28 March 1655)
| A daughter | 24 July 1621; Stockholm | | Stillborn, buried in Riddarholmskyrkan. |
| Christina | 16 October 1623; Stockholm | 21 September 1624; Stockholm | Heiress presumptive to the thrones of Sweden and Denmark; buried in Riddarholmskyrkan. |
| A son | May 1625; Gripsholm Castle | | Stillborn, buried in Riddarholmskyrkan. |
| Christina | 8 December 1626; Stockholm | 19 April 1689; Rome | Queen of Sweden (1632 – 1654), never married; buried in St. Peter's Basilica. |

== Gallery ==
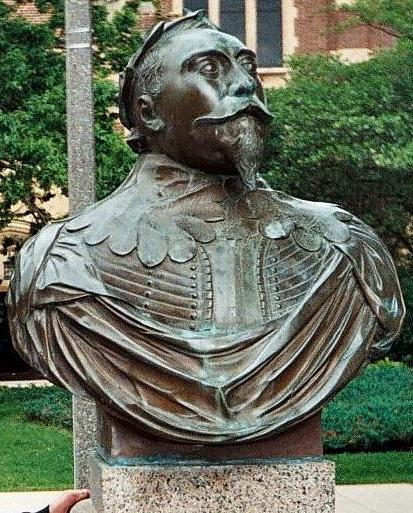
Bust of King Gustav Adolph on campus at Gustavus Adolphus College in Minnesota

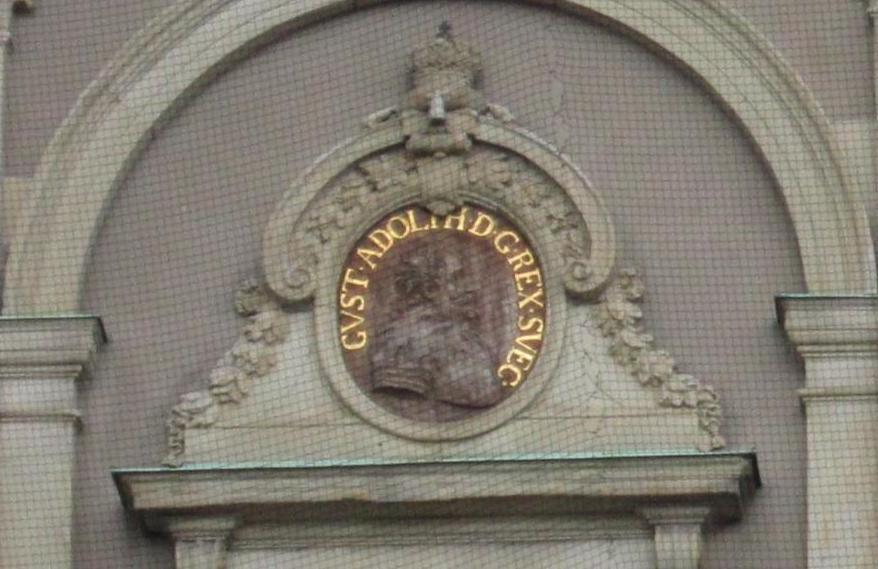
Image of King Gustav Adolph on a wall of Stockholm Palace

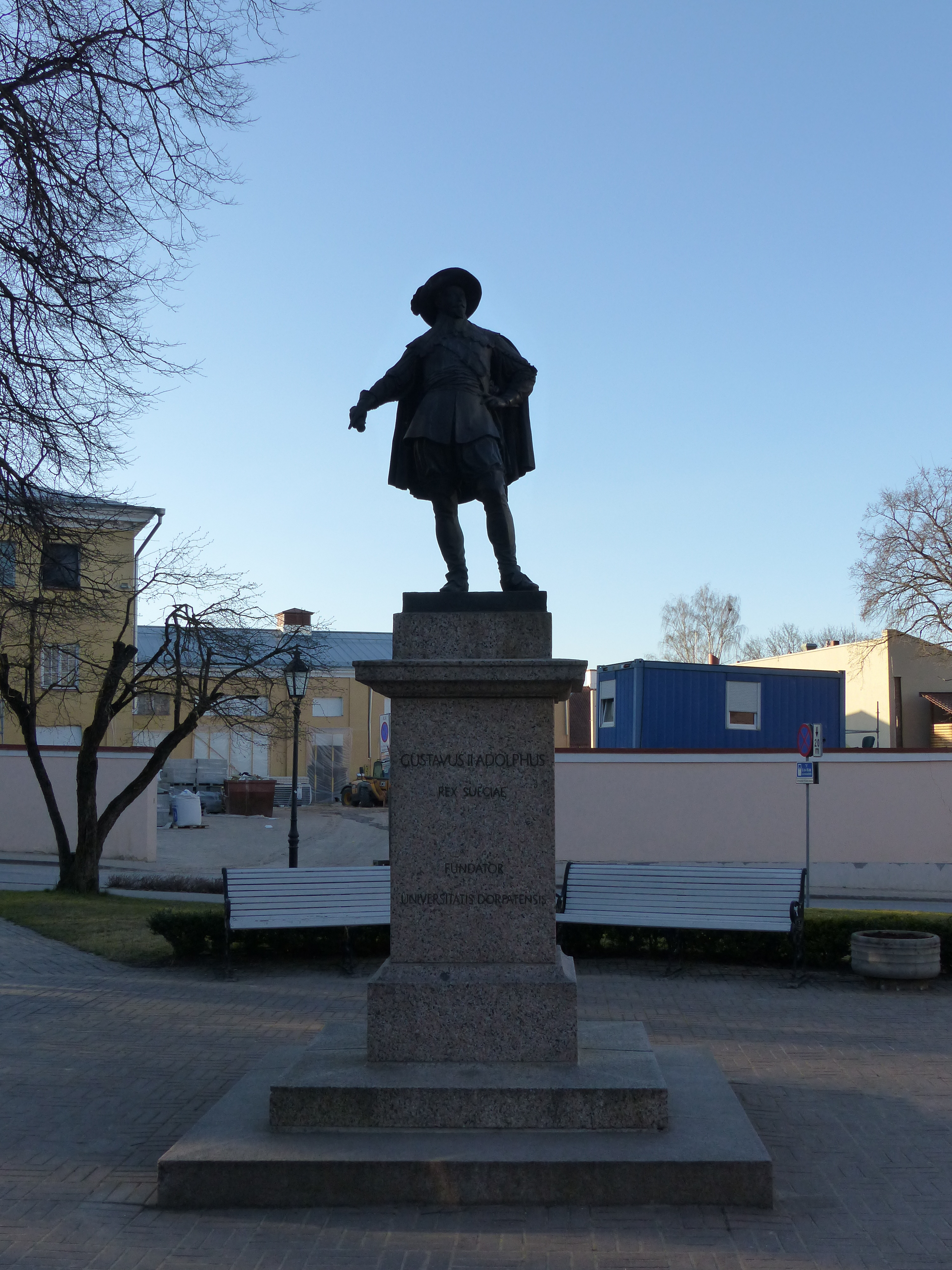
Statue of King Gustav Adolph in Tartu, Estonia

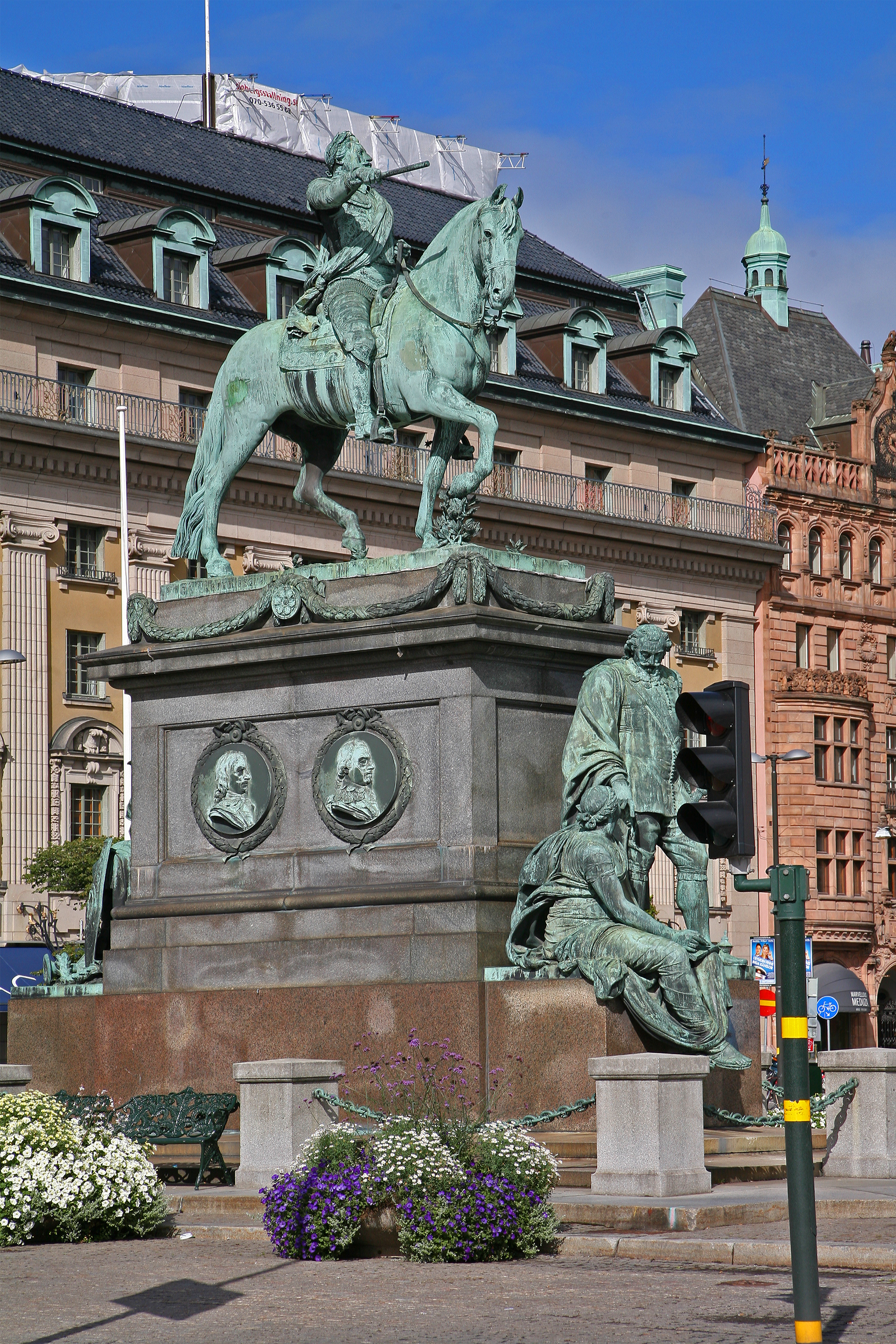
Stockholm statue at square named for him

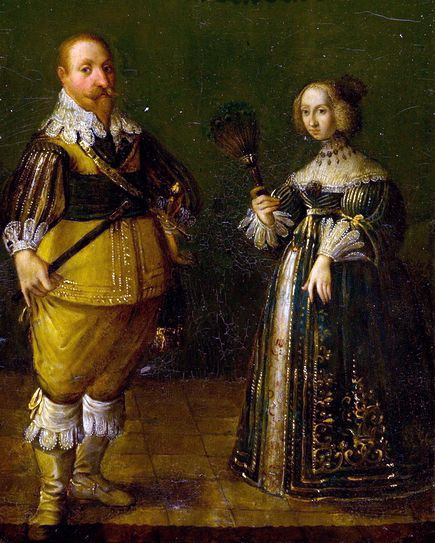
With his wife

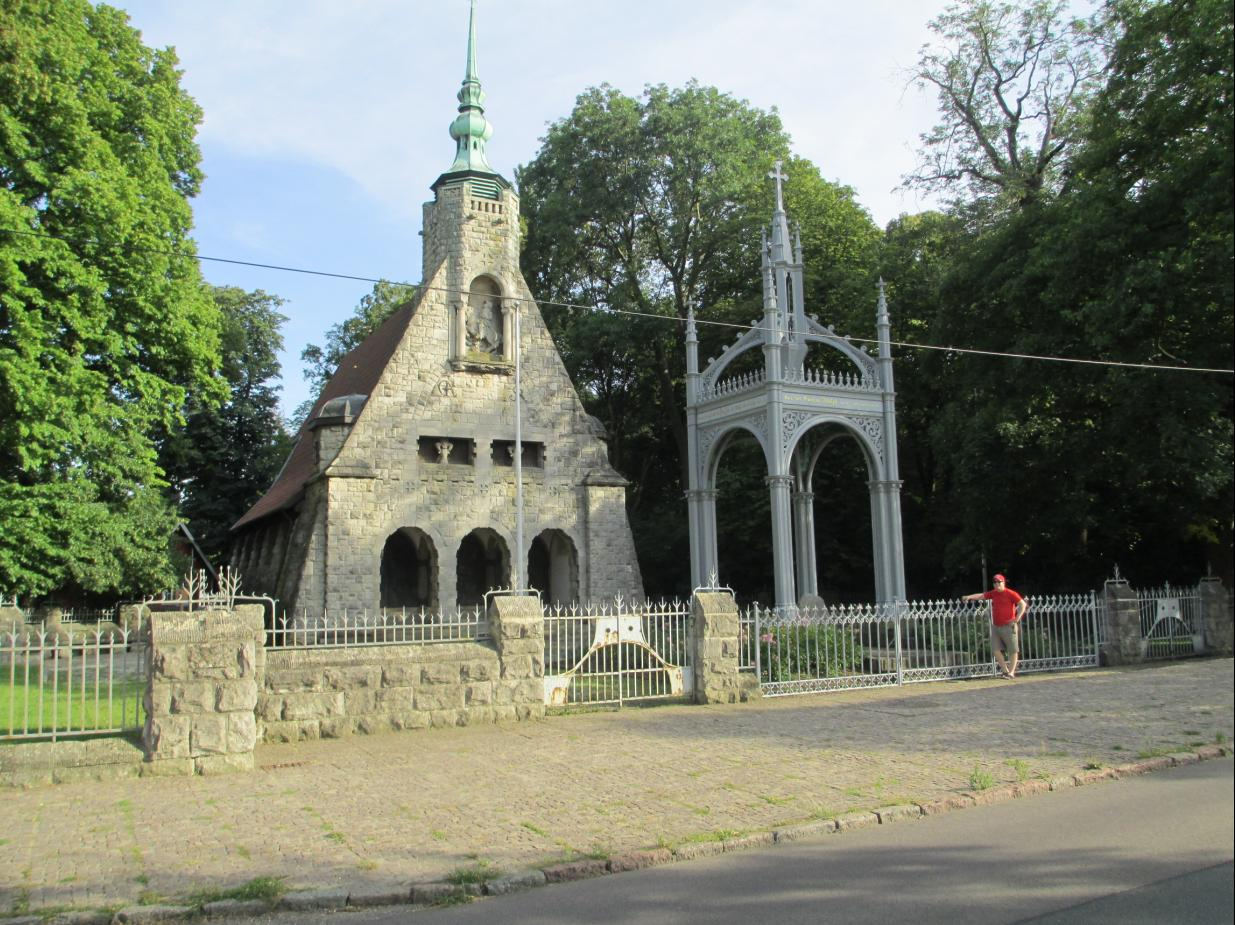
Death location memorial in Lützen

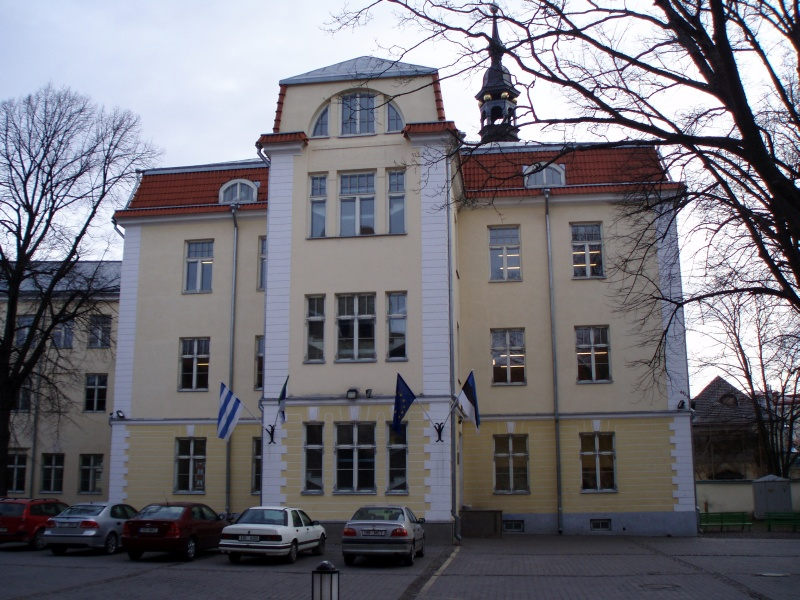
Gustav Adolf Grammar School in Tallinn, 2007

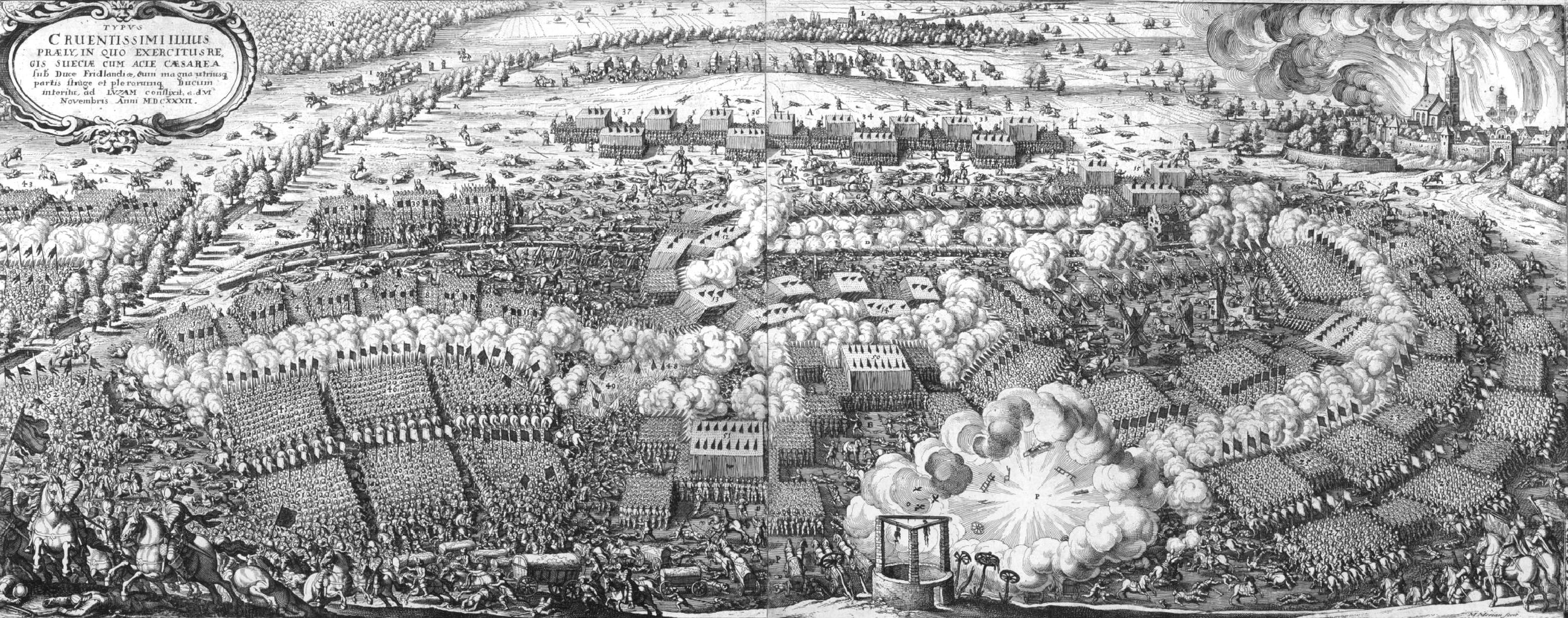
The Battle of Lützen, 1632. Engraving by Matthäus Merian

Gustavus Adolphus's lit de parade, by F. and J. Strachen, Wolgast 1633

== In music and fiction ==
The Swedish composer Franz Berwald composed the choral work Gustaf Adolph den stores seger och död vid Lützen (Gustav Adolf the Great's Victory and Death near Lützen) in 1845. He is also the protagonist of Max Bruch's 1898 choral work Gustav Adolf.

He is also a significant supporting character in the best-selling alternate history book series, 1632, written by American author Eric Flint (first published in 2000).

The song "The Lion from the North" from the album Carolus Rex, released in 2012 by Swedish power metal band Sabaton, is about Gustavus Adolphus, and the same goes for "Gott Mit Uns". "Till Seger", a song from the album Legends, released in 2025 by the same band, is also about him.

Adolphus is a playable leader in the Gods & Kings expansion pack of the video game Civilization V.

== See also ==
- History of Sweden
- Rise of Sweden as a Great Power
- Axel Oxenstierna
- Gustav of Vasaborg
- Gustav Adolf Grammar School

== Bibliography ==
- Ahnlund, Nils, Gustav Adolf the Great, trans. Michael Roberts., Princeton, 1940.
- Brzezinski, Richard, The Army of Gustavus Adolphus. (Osprey, 1993). ISBN 1-85532-350-8. excerpt
- Brzezinski, Richard. Lützen 1632: Climax of the Thirty Years’ War (Praeger, 2005).
- Dupuy, Trevor Nevitt. The Military Life of Gustavus Adolphus: Father of Modern War (Franklin Watts, 1969).
- Earle, E.M. ed. Makers of Modern Strategy: Military Thought from Machiavelli to Hitler, 1948.
- Grönhammar, Ann; Nestor, Sofia (2011). The Royal Armoury in the cellar vaults of the Royal Palace. HathiTrust Digital Library. ISBN 978-9187594304.
- Grundberg, Malin [in Swedish] (2005). Ceremoniernas makt: Maktöverföring och genus i Vasatidens kungliga ceremonier (in Swedish). Nordic Academic Press. ISBN 91-89116-73-9.
- Haythornthwaite, Philip J. Invincible Generals (Firebird Books, 1991) ISBN 978-1-853-14105-8.
- Murray, Stuart (2009). The Library: An Illustrated History. War and a Golden Age: Skyhorse Publishing.
- Nordstrom, Byron J. "Gustavus II Adolphus (Sweden) (1594–1632; Ruled 1611–1632)" Encyclopedia of the Early Modern World: Europe, 1450 to 1789, 2004.
- Rangström, Lena (2015). Dödens teater: Kungliga svenska begravningar genom fem århundraden (in Swedish). Atlantis. ISBN 978-91-7353-785-8.
- Ringmar, Erik. Identity, Interest and Action: A Cultural Explanation of Sweden's Intervention in the Thirty Years' War. (Cambridge, 1996).
- Roberts, Michael. Gustavus Adolphus, A History of Sweden 1611–1632 (two volumes) (London: Longmans, Green, 1953–1958).
- Roberts, Michael (1992). Gustavus Adolphus. Profiles in Power (2nd ed.). London: Longman. ISBN 9780582090002.
- Roberts, Michael. Gustavus Adolphus and the Rise of Sweden (London: English Universities Press, 1973).
- Roberts, Michael. The Military Revolution 1560–1660, (Belfast: M. Boyd, 1956).
- Roberts, Michael. Sweden as a great power 1611–1697 (London: St. Martin's Press, 1968)
- Roberts, Michael (12 June 1986). The Early Vasas. CUP Archive. ISBN 978-0-521-31182-3.
- Schürger, André. The Battle of Lützen: an examination of 17th century military material culture (University of Glasgow 2015) .
- Wolke, Lars Ericson. Gustavus Adolphus, Sweden and the Thirty Years War 1630-1632 (Pen & Sword Books, 2022)
- Generalstaben (1936). Tyska kriget intill mitten av januari 1631 [The German war until mid-January 1631]. Sveriges krig 1611-1632 (in Swedish). Vol. 3. Stockholm: Generalstaben.

=== Historiography ===
- Ekman, Ernst. "Three Decades of Research on Gustavus Adolphus" Journal of Modern History 38#3 (1966), pp. 243–255 DOI: 10.2307/1877349 online
- Jorgensen, Christer (2013). "Gustavus Adolphus II". In Charles Messenger (ed.). Reader's Guide to Military History. Routledge. pp. 218–19. ISBN 9781135959708.
- Murray, Jeremy. "The English-Language Military Historiography of Gustavus Adolphus in the Thirty Years’ War, 1900–Present," Western Illinois Historical Review (Spring 2013) vol 5. online
- Thomson, Erik. "Beyond the Military State: Sweden’s Great Power Period in Recent Historiography." History Compass 9.4 (2011): 269–283. online

Gustav II Adolf House of Vasa Born: 9 December 1594 Died: 6 November 1632
Regnal titles
| Preceded by Charles IX | King of Sweden; 1611–1632 | Succeeded by Christina |
