= Polish–Swedish War (1621–1625) =

Phase of the Polish-Swedish war

- Part of the Polish–Swedish wars
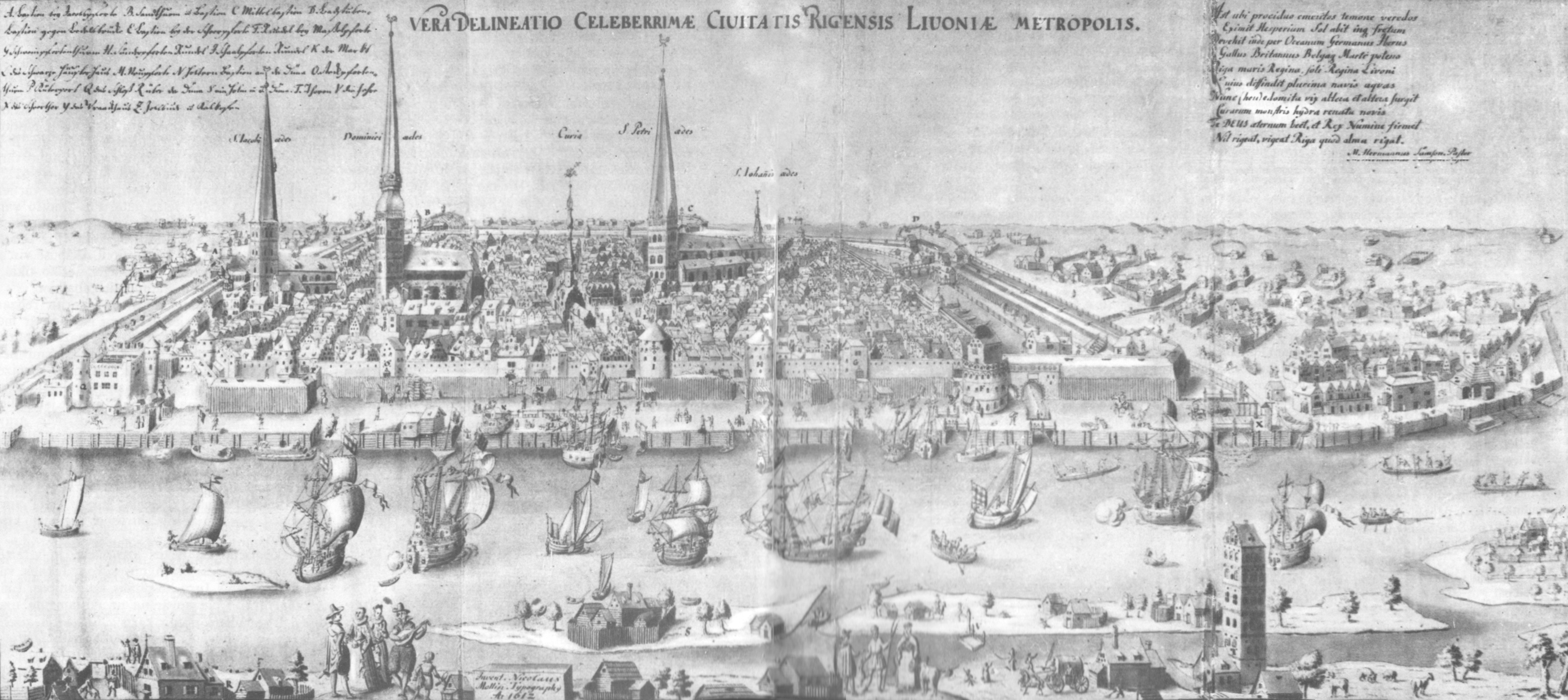
- View of Riga 1612, printed by Nikolaus Mollyn, engraved by Heinrich Thum
Date	1621–1625
Location	Latvia; Poland; Lithuania
Result	Swedish victory
Territorial changes	Commonwealth cedes Livonia north of the Daugava river

Belligerents
(yes) Swedish Empire	Polish–Lithuanian Commonwealth; Courland

Commanders and leaders
(Swedish Empire) Gustavus Adolphus (Swedish Empire) Samuel Cockburn (Swedish Empire) Gustav Horn	(Polish–Lithuanian Commonwealth) Sigismund III (Polish–Lithuanian Commonwealth) Aleksander Gosiewski (Polish–Lithuanian Commonwealth) Krzysztof Radziwiłł

Strength
Unknown	Unknown

Casualties and losses
Unknown	Unknown

The Polish–Swedish War (1621 to 1625) was one in a series of conflicts between the Polish–Lithuanian Commonwealth and Sweden during the first half of the 17th century. It began in August 1621, when Gustavus Adolphus of Sweden invaded the Commonwealth territory of Livonia and captured Riga, one of the wealthiest and most important ports in Europe.

With their resources focused on the Polish–Ottoman War (1620–1621), the Commonwealth was unable to expel the Swedes. Under the terms of the Truce of Mitawa in November 1622, they ceded Livonia north of the Daugava, while the Swedes also retained Riga.

== Background ==
The most recent conflict showed the Swedish Army, despite several reforms, was still unable to defeat the Polish–Lithuanian Commonwealth. Furthermore, King Gustav Adolf was still regarded in Europe as a usurper. To safeguard the Swedish crown for himself, Gustav Adolf decided to force Sigismund III Vasa to relinquish it. With help from Axel Oxenstierna, the Swedish king introduced a widespread program of military and social reforms, which resulted in the creation of a well trained army, based on native recruits. These further reforms and the ongoing conflict between the Commonwealth and the Ottoman Empire (see Polish–Ottoman War (1620–21)), offered a further chance to defeat the Commonwealth.

== First phase (1621–22) ==
While the Polish–Lithuanian army was concentrated in Podolia, in the south of the Commonwealth, a Swedish army landed near Pärnu (today part of Estonia) on 19 August 1621. It was carried by a fleet of 148 vessels (25 warships, 3 pinnacles, 7 galleys, 7 smaller warships and 106 transport boats). Gustav Adolf had 14,700 infantry, 3,150 cavalry and 375 cannons. The Swedes immediately marched towards Riga, and started a siege on 29 August. The capital of Livonia was defended by a garrison of 300 soldiers, plus 3,700 armed residents. Lithuanian Field Hetman Krzysztof Radziwiłł had only 1,500 soldiers at his disposal, as most units were in Podolia and Red Ruthenia.

Riga capitulated on 25 September, after three assaults. On 2 October the Swedes captured the fortress of Dunamunde. The invaders, marching through marshes and forests to avoid Lithuanian cavalry, entered the Duchy of Courland and Semigallia, capturing its capital, Mitau without resistance. The Swedes then tried to capture the fortress of Koknese, but failed to do so, after a skirmish with Lithuanian cavalry of Aleksander Gosiewski.

In early January 1622, the Swedes captured Valmiera, together with several smaller Livonian castles. Meanwhile, the forces under Hetman Radziwiłł grew to 3,000, which enabled the Lithuanians to respond better to Swedish attacks. On 7 January Radziwiłł recaptured Mitau, but because of a lack of artillery, he failed to seize its castle, whose garrison did not capitulate until 6 July. A few weeks later, in late July 1622, main Swedish forces reached Mittau, and a prolonged battle ensued.

Since the battle turned into a stalemate, on 10 August 1622, both sides signed a truce, which in 1623 was prolonged until March 1625. During the negotiations, envoys of Gustav Adolf suggested a Swedish–Lithuanian union.

== Truce ==
The Swedish eventually insisted on a truce due to financial problems of the Swedish Empire, as the costs of the war were too high for their treasury. Furthermore, in the autumn of 1621, the Polish–Ottoman War ended (see Battle of Khotyn (1621)), and the army of the Commonwealth was ready to march to Livonia. The truce, signed by the Lithuanians, enraged King Sigismund III Vasa, who planned to transfer all forces northwards, hoping that with the help of the Spanish Navy, he would be able to invade Sweden itself.

Polish nobility and leaders such as Krzysztof Radziwiłł and Krzysztof Zbaraski disagreed with the royal plans. They wanted the King to agree to Swedish terms, and to relinquish the Swedish throne in exchange for a permanent peace treaty and Livonia. Radziwiłł emphasized the fact that after the reforms, the Swedish army was difficult to defeat, and Poland–Lithuania also needed a major overhaul of its armed forces, especially the infantry and artillery. The Commonwealth also needed a strong navy and specialized units of engineers, trained in erection of field fortifications.

Regardless of the opinion of his generals, Sigismund III ordered construction of a fleet, which, with help from the Spanish Empire, was to transport the invading army to Sweden. In 1623, the Polish King met with the Starosta of Puck, Jan Wejher, telling him to build the fleet. However, from the very beginning, this was questioned by the powerful and semi-independent city of Gdańsk, whose government, under Swedish pressure, opposed the very idea of a Commonwealth fleet, and did not allow it to be anchored in its port. Under these circumstances, Sigismund III Wasa decided to expand the port and shipyard of Puck. In 1624–1626, seven medium size ships were built here, with tonnage ranging from 200 to 400 tons. They were manned mostly by local Kashubian fishermen, while marine infantry consisted of English mercenaries, employed by the Polish King since 1621. The biggest ship of the new fleet was the galleon Król Dawid commanded by James Murray.

== Second phase (1625–26) ==
Before the end of the truce, Gustav Adolf initiated talks with the Tsardom of Russia and the Ottoman Empire, hoping for a joint attack on Poland–Lithuania. Furthermore, he sent envoys to try to incite the Zaporozhian Cossacks, who were Polish subjects, to attack Turkey, and provoke another Polish–Ottoman war.

On 27 June 1625 Gustav Adolf landed in Livonia with an army of 20,000. The main Swedish corps of almost 10,000 marched up the Daugava River, and besieged Koknese, capturing it after sixteen days. On 27 August the Swedes captured Tartu, and soon afterwards, Mitau. In early September 1625, Swedish forces invaded the Grand Duchy of Lithuania, capturing Biržai on 7 September. This success cut links between Polish–Lithuanian garrisons remaining in Livonia, and those stationed in Lithuania, as Sweden now controlled the line of the Daugava. Furthermore, on 27 September, Sweden captured the fortress of Bauska.

Swedish successes were possible also because of a bitter conflict between two powerful Lithuanian hetmans, Krzysztof Radziwiłł and Lew Sapieha. As a result, the armed forces of both leaders did not unite and operated separately, which put the Commonwealth at a disadvantage.

In October 1625 Radziwiłł retook several castles, while Sapieha fought off a Swedish assault on Daugavpils. Radziwiłł then concentrated his forces in Courland, sending a few banners to harass Swedish units in Livonia. Meanwhile, Sapieha camped near Valle (Wallhof, southern Latvia), which lies halfway between Bauska and Koknese. Gustav Adolf was well aware of internal divisions among the Lithuanians, and decided to take advantage of it. On 13 January 1626 he concentrated his forces, and on 17 January 1626 the Battle of Wallhof took place, in which for the first time Swedish forces defeated the Commonwealth in open battle. At the Battle of Gniew, on 22 September and 29 September to 1 October 1626, the Swedish forces stopped three attacks by the hussars.

== Aftermath ==
After this failure, the Lithuanians limited their activities to attacks on Swedish patrols. Gustav Adolf, on the other hand, was content with the performance of his army, and decided to transfer the war to Royal Prussia. During that period, the Battle of Dirschau (17–18 August 1627), the hussars were driven from the field by the Swedish cavalry. The Swedes were victorious again at Górzno on 4 February 1629.

== Sources ==
- Baister, Stephen; Patrick, Chris (2007). Latvia. Bradt Travel Guides. ISBN 978-1-84162-201-9.
- Frost, Robert I. (2000). The Northern Wars: War, State and Society in Northeastern Europe, 1558 – 1721. Pearson Education. ISBN 978-0582064294.
- Kotljarchuk, Andrej (2006). In the Shadows of Poland and Russia: The Grand Duchy of Lithuania and Sweden in the European Crisis of the mid-17th Century (PDF). Stockholm University. ISBN 9189315634.
- Wolke, Lars Ericson (2009). Krig och krigsmakt under svensk stormaktstid (in Swedish). Svenskt Militärhistoriskt Bibliotek. ISBN 978-9185873722.
