= Gustavus Adolphus' reconquest of Öland =

Successful Swedish invasion of Öland

- Part of the Kalmar War
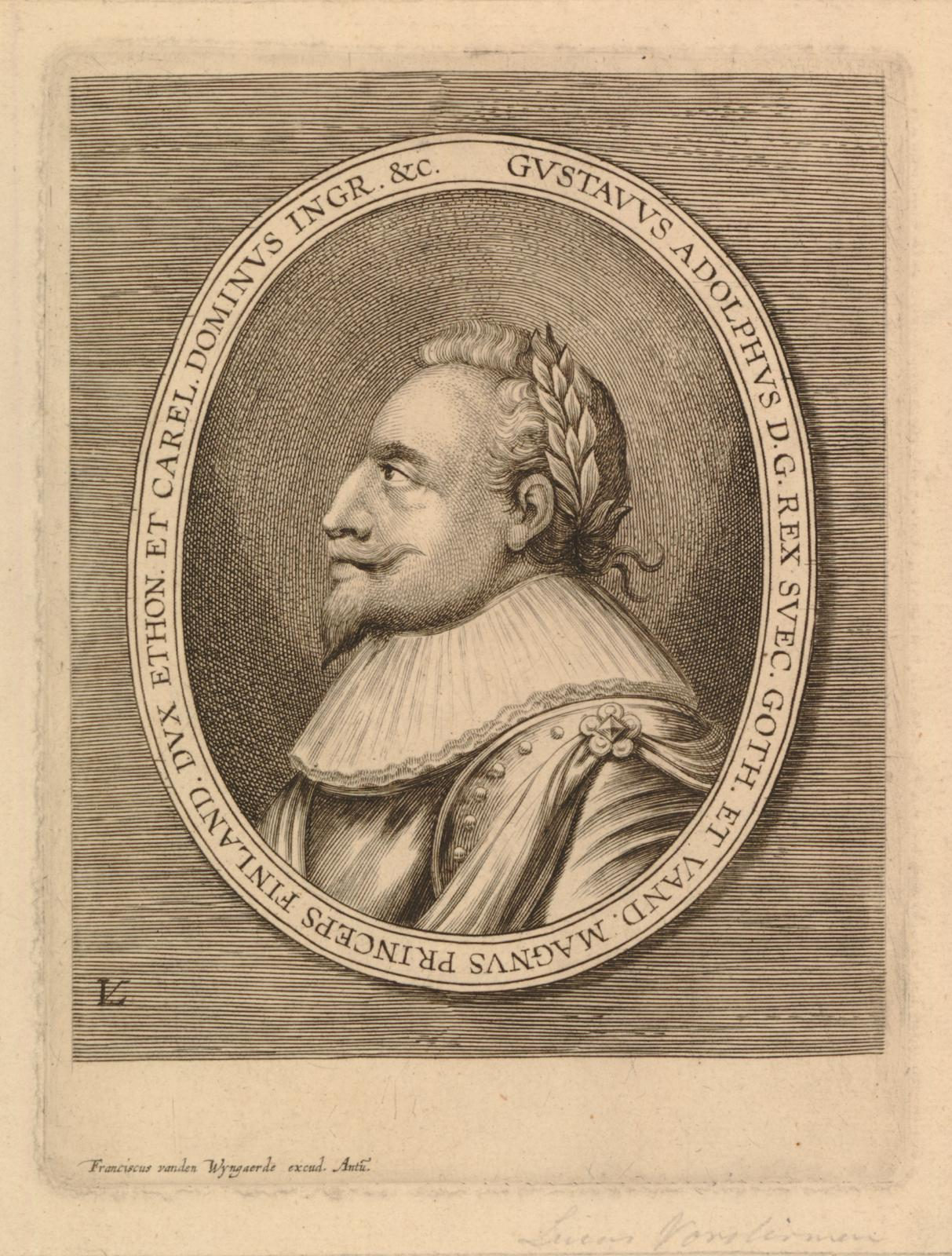
- Portrait of Gustavus Adolphus from the mid 17th century
Date	26 or 27 September – 8 October 1611
Location	Öland
Result	Swedish victory
Territorial changes	Öland reconquered by Sweden

Belligerents
(yes) Swedish Empire	Denmark–Norway

Commanders and leaders
(Swedish Empire) Gustavus Adolphus (Swedish Empire) Per Hammarskiöld	(Denmark–Norway) Gert von Rantzau

Units involved
(Swedish Empire) 3 cavalry banners (Swedish Empire) 7–8 infantry companies (Swedish Empire) Little fleet	(Denmark–Norway) 5 infantry companies (Denmark–Norway) 2 cavalry companies

Strength
2,000 men	Unknown

Casualties and losses
Unknown	800 killed

Gustavus Adolphus' reconquest of Öland occurred from 26 or 27 September to 8 October 1611 during the Kalmar War.

== Background ==
While Christian IV prepared to return to Copenhagen with the main Danish fleet, Gustavus Adolphus, along with Per Hammarskiöld, prepared to reconquer Öland from Denmark, Per Hammarskiöld also knew the island well. For the invasion, Adolphus gathered three banners of cavalry and some seven or eight companies of infantry.

The cavalry consisted of Hammarskiöld's old unit, the Småland banner, which was commanded by Per Nilsson, and Victori Sim's cavalry company. The infantry consisted of the Drabant Company under Anders Larsson, Gertrom Yggesson's Småland company, Nils Assersson Mannerskiöld's Östergötland company, and most likely Olf Olsson's Västmanland company. The infantry also included men that had recently came from Finland, including Erik Olsson and Bryngen Torstensson's companies, both conscripted in Finland, and a Scottish company under Robert Sim. Contemporary source put the total strength of the force to 2,000 men.

=== Prelude ===
Gustavus Adolphus and his men planned to cross the Kalmar Strait towards Öland with the so-called "little fleet" under Captain Erik Kyle, which planned to set out froim Skäggenäs, a peninsula around 15 kilometers north of Kalmar. Before crossing, Adolphus made contact with local peasants, who promised assistance.

On 25 September, Gert von Rantzau learned of the planned operation, allegedly from observing the Swedish ships in Skäggenäs, and thus led three companies of infantry from his own regiment, under Valentin Rosworm, Christopher Luppert, and Jørgen Baroldt respectively across the strait to Öland. As a result, Öland was now defended by two Danish cavalry companies, being the enlisted harquebusier companies under Jørgen Grubbe and Tessen von Parsow, who had handed over command to Franz Ernst von Dalwig, along with five companies of infantry, consisting of the three companies from Rantzau and two under respectively Mathias Kochheim and Søren Bugge.

== Invasion ==
It is likely that Rantzau notified Christian IV of the impending invasion, however, the next day, the Danish main fleet returned to Copenhagen with Christian onboard. Later on the same day, in the evening of 26 or 27 September, Gustavus Adolphus crossed the Kalmar Strait, landing near Stora Rör, 18 kilometers south from Borgholm. The operation was flawless, and local peasants met him on the shore with horses for transport, and many peasants joined the force. At Räpplinge, he surprised and dispersed two Danish companies on the way to Borgholm, leaving some 800 Danes killed. The rest escaped to Borgholm castle. When Rantzau attempted to return to the mainland by sea in order to bring reinforcements, his yacht was swept eastwards to Gotland because of unfavourable winds, delaying the response.

Gustavus Adolphus and his forces quickly and easily mopped the remaining Danes up on the island, and on 7 October, Borgholm castle surrendered, and Adolphus marched in on 8 October, installing Per Hammarskiöld as the commander. Most of the German soldiers in the Danish companies enlisted in the Swedish army, while Adolphus sent the others to Kalmar, after they had sworn not to fight Sweden for three months.

== Aftermath ==
Hammarskiöld received the three Swedish cavalry banners and four infantry companies to defend the island, and the peasant representatives who crossed the strait in order to swear fealty to Christian IV were put on trial and later executed for treason. The invasion was Gustavus Adolphus' second independent command, and it is likely that he received advice from the more experienced Hammarskiöld during the operation.

Later, Adolphus returned to his father, Charles IX, at Ryssby. During December and January, Danish forces from Kalmar raided Öland on multiple occasions. However, they did not attempt to reconquer the island.

== See also ==
- Rantzau's reconquest of Öland – Successful Danish invasion of Öland

== Works cited ==
- Essen, Michael Fredholm von (9 August 2023). The Kalmar War 1611-1613: Gustavus Adolphus's First War. Helion & Company. ISBN 9781804510063.
- Isacson, Claes-Göran (2006). Vägen till stormakt : Vasaättens krig [The road to great power: The wars of the Vasa dynasty] (in Swedish). Norstedts. ISBN 9789113015026.
- Generalstaben (1936). Sveriges krig, 1611-1632 [Sweden's Wars, 1611-1632] (in Swedish). Vol. 1. Generalstaben.
- Weibull, Lauritz (1938). Scandia: Tidskrift för historisk forskning · Volumes 11-12 [Scandia: Journal of historical research · Volumes 11-12] (in Swedish). Statens humanistiska forskningsråd.
