= Storming of Kristianopel =

1611 battle

- Part of the Kalmar War
Date	26 June 1611
Location	Kristianopel, Blekinge, Denmark
Result	Swedish victory

Belligerents
(yes) Swedish Empire	Denmark–Norway

Commanders and leaders
(Swedish Empire) Gustavus Adolphus	(Denmark–Norway) Jens Bjørnsen †

Units involved
(Swedish Empire) Måns Stierna's cavalry banner (Swedish Empire) Jon Andersson's cavalry banner	(Denmark–Norway) Kristianopel garrison

Strength
1,500 in cavalry	300 men

Casualties and losses
Few	Everyone killed, wounded, or captured
- Heavy civilian casualties

The Storming of Kristianopel occurred on 26 June 1611, during the Kalmar War. Gustavus Adolphus of Sweden led an assault from the camp in Högsby in Småland on Kristianopel in Blekinge. The Swedes managed to siege the fortified city and went in by bombing the fortress port, which was badly defended. Right after the assault, there was a massacre of the city's population, with rape and pillaging.

== Background ==
After the capitulation of Kalmar to the Danes, the Swedes managed to capture a courier with a letter from Jens Bjørnsen in Kristianopel, which was a major supply depot for the Danes. The letter in question was addressed to the town's lensmand and commander, Jens Sparre, who had joined the Danish army at Kalmar. In the letter, Bjørnsen requested reinforcements, and assuming that Sparre had not taken too many men with him, Kristianopel may have had a garrison of some 300 men.

With the new intelligence, Charles IX sent Crown Prince Gustavus Adolphus with two cavalry banners, most likely Måns Stierna's and Jon Andersson's, and a unit of sappers to Kristianopel.

== Storming ==
At 1am on 26 June, Adolphus and his men reached Kristianopel without being detected. The Danish sentries positioned at the gate were drunk, so a few Swedes were able to sneak up to blow the gate up using a petard. The explosion allowed Adolphus and the cavalry to charge into the town. Jens Bjørnsen made a desperate attempt to hold the gate against the Swedes, and managed to kill some of the, before being killed himself. Then, Adolphus ordered one of the banners to take control of the market square, letting the other one sack the town.

Not being inclined to show any more mercy than the Danes at Kalmar, the Swedes left the town burning and sacked in the morning, having killed every man they could find, along with many women and children. After the sacking, it took several days for the local peasants to approach the town and bury the dead.

== Aftermath ==
Gustavus Adolphus captured much booty, including the Danish war chest of some 20,000 Reichsthalers, and later returned to the Swedish camp outside of Kalmar with 28 captured Danish standards. According to one story, when the standards were proudly displayed, the Swedish sentries panicked, leading to some opening fire and one of Adolphus' men was killed in the incident. According to another, probably more reliable story, the man was killed after being fired upon by a Danish unit at Kalmar.

== Works cited ==
- Essen, Michael Fredholm von (9 August 2023). The Kalmar War 1611-1613: Gustavus Adolphus's First War. Helion & Company. ISBN 9781804510063.
