= Polish–Swedish War (1626–1629) =

Fourth of the 1600 to 1629 Polish-Swedish wars

- Part of Polish–Swedish War (1600–1629), Polish-Swedish Wars
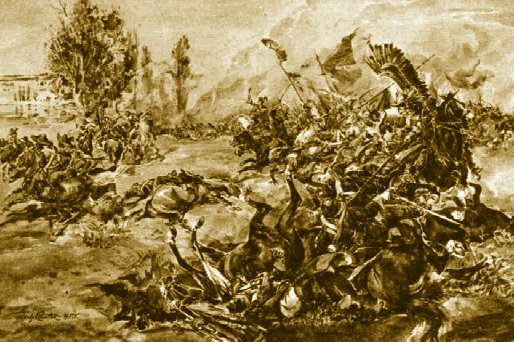
- Battle of Trzciana by Józef Brandt
Date	1626–1629
Location	Baltic Sea, Prussia, Latvia, Poland
Result	Swedish victory, see § Outcome
Territorial changes	Polish–Lithuanian Commonwealth acknowledges Swedish occupation of Livonia; Sweden retains multiple ports in Royal and East Prussia

Belligerents
Swedish Empire	Polish–Lithuanian Commonwealth

Commanders and leaders
(Swedish Empire) Gustavus Adolphus (Swedish Empire) Axel Oxenstierna (Swedish Empire) Herman Wrangel	(Polish–Lithuanian Commonwealth) Sigismund (Polish–Lithuanian Commonwealth) Koniecpolski (Polish–Lithuanian Commonwealth) Jan Sapieha (Polish–Lithuanian Commonwealth) Stanisław Potocki (Holy Roman Empire) von Arnim

Strength
40,000 (Note: Maximum at any one time, includes troops based in Livonia)	Unknown

Casualties and losses
30,000 dead	Unknown

The Polish–Swedish War (1626–1629) (Note: Also known as the "War of the Vistula Mouth") was the last in a series fought by Sweden and the Polish–Lithuanian Commonwealth between 1600 and 1629. In July 1626, Gustavus Adolphus landed in Polish Prussia in an attempt to capture Gdańsk, but neither side could win a decisive advantage and the war became a stalemate.

Under the September 1629 Truce of Altmark, the Commonwealth accepted the loss of what became Swedish Livonia, including the strategic Baltic Sea port of Riga. Sweden also retained its gains in Prussia, although these were returned in the 1635 Treaty of Stuhmsdorf. The end of hostilities permitted Swedish intervention in the Thirty Years' War in June 1630.

== Background ==
The conflict between Sweden and the Polish–Lithuanian Commonwealth was caused by the territorial ambitions of Gustavus II Adolphus in the Baltic Sea, and Sigismund III Vasa's desire to regain the Swedish throne. With the latter engaged in a simultaneous war with the Ottomans, in 1625 Gustavus compelled him to cede Livonia north of the Daugava river. By attacking Pomerania, he hoped to secure his position in the Baltic, and clear the way for Swedish intervention in the Thirty Years' War.

== 1626 campaign ==
On 17 January 1626, the Swedes routed Commonwealth troops under Jan Stanisław Sapieha at Wallhof in Latvia. Having thus completed the conquest of Livonia, Gustavus occupied Courland to the south and then decided to bypass Lithuania in favour of an attack on Polish Prussia. Wealthy enough to support his army, the province also contained Gdańsk, (Note: Then known as Danzig) a Hanseatic League member, the largest port in the Commonwealth, and one of the richest cities in Europe. Its acquisition would significantly increase Swedish power in the Baltic, and Gustavus made it his primary objective.

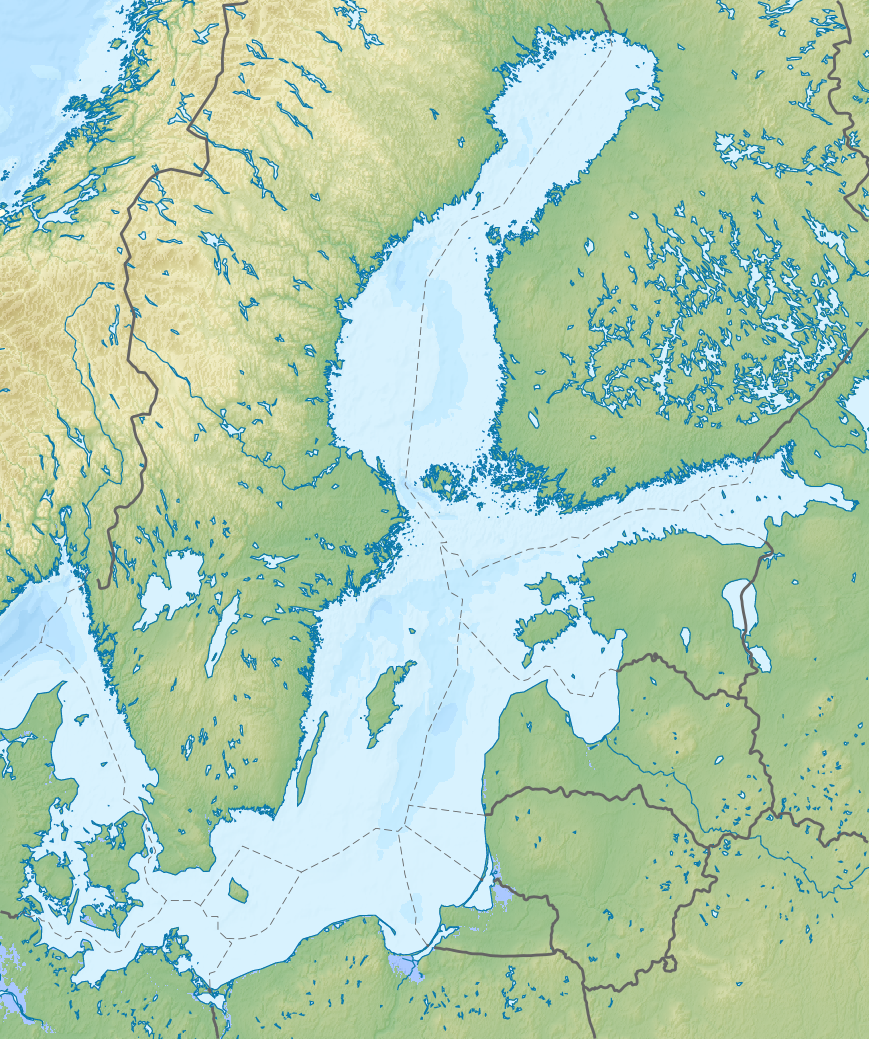
The Baltic Sea; key locations in text

On 6 July, Gustavus landed at Pillau with 125 ships and 14,000 men. With the defenders taken by surprise and the local population sympathetic to the Protestant invaders, his troops rapidly occupied Braniewo, Frombork, Elbląg, Orneta, and Malbork. They then crossed the Vistula and took Tczew, Gniew, Oliwa and Puck, while the Swedish fleet began collecting tolls from merchant ships entering Gdańsk.

Funded by other Hanseatic cities, Gdańsk strengthened its defences and appealed to Sigismund for help. The marshy ground and large area to be covered made a direct siege impractical, so Gustavus set up a blockade centred on fortified camps just outside Gdańsk and at Tczew. Between 22 September and 1 October, the Swedes fought a series of actions around Gniew with a Polish relief force, culminating in an inconclusive battle. Having delayed an immediate attack on Gdańsk, Sigismund withdrew to assemble reinforcements.

In November, Stanisław Koniecpolski, the Polish hetman or Field Marshal, took command in Pomerania. He had just over 6,000 troops available, the majority of whom were cavalry. These were used to attack Swedish supply lines, and managed to halt any further advances. The Sejm approved taxes to fund the war, but the year ended with another Commonwealth defeat near Koknese in Livonia.

== 1627 to 1628 campaign ==
1626 to 1628 Pomerania campaign; key locations in text

1627 opened with an attack by Koniecpolski on Puck, which surrendered on 2 April. In response, Axel Oxenstierna, then Lord High Chancellor of Sweden, planned a counter-attack by two separate forces. The first consisted of troops taken from Swedish garrisons on the Vistula, supported by a second under von Lauenstein, largely composed of German mercenaries recruited in Pomerania.

Logistical delays and heavy flooding along the Vistula prevented the two forces from combining. This allowed Koniecpolski to isolate von Lauenstein, whose troops mutinied and forced him to surrender at Czarne on 17 April. Most of the Germans switched sides and were incorporated into Koniecpolski's army.

In late May, Gustavus was lightly wounded near Kiezmark, but by July had recovered enough to lead an expedition to relieve Braniewo and besiege Orneta, recently retaken by the Poles. Koniecpolski took advantage of his absence to recapture Gniew, before attacking the Swedish camp at Tczew. The ensuing Battle of Dirschau, fought between 17 and 18 August, was inconclusive, but the Polish position improved when they recaptured Oliwa in late November. With the Swedes unable to progress the siege and the Poles too weak to expel them, the war became one of attrition.

== 1629 campaign ==
Disease and lack of funding meant active operations largely ceased until early 1629. On 2 February, Swedish troops under Herman Wrangel were marching to relieve the garrison at Brodnica when they encountered and routed 4,000 Poles at Górzno. This prompted Sigismund to accept help from Emperor Ferdinand, whose Imperial army was currently blockading Stralsund as part of the Thirty Years' War. Concerned by Swedish advances in the Baltic, in May Ferdinand ordered von Arnim and his corps to reinforce the Poles.

1629 campaign; key locations in text

Gustavus now had more than 23,000 men available in Prussia, but most were committed to the blockade, leaving him a field army of 7,000 based at Kwidzyn. With these he advanced on Grudziądz, hoping to intercept von Arnim before he could join up with Koniecpolski. The attempt failed, forcing the outnumbered Swedes to withdraw, and they were caught by Polish and Imperial cavalry at Trzciana on 29 June. Although his cavalry suffered heavy casualties covering the retreat, Gustavus and most of his troops reached Malbork in good order.

However, co-operation between the Imperial and Commonwealth forces was short-lived. The Poles mistrusted von Arnim, who previously served in the Swedish army, while the latter complained they failed to pay or supply his troops as agreed, and resigned. The stalemate continued, with the Swedes too firmly entrenched in the Vistula delta to be forced out, but not strong enough to take Gdańsk. Another concern for Gustavus was the mounting cost of the campaign, with more than 35,000 of the 50,000 Swedish conscripts sent to Prussia since 1625 either dead or missing.

== Aftermath ==
During the final phase of this conflict, there was a Franco-Dutch-Swedish diplomatic activity from 1627 until 1635, envoys Louis Deshayes, Cornelius Haga, Antoni Monier, Johan Möller, Paul Strassburg and Jacques Roussel) in an effort to form an Anti-Catholic coalition in the west with the Eastern Orthodox Church and Muslims by inviting the Russia, the Zaporozhian Cossacks, Crimean Khanate, Transylvania, Moldavia, Wallachia and the Ottoman Empire as allies. The recipients of this dpilomatic missions were the Patriarch Filaret of Moscow, Cyril Lucaris, the Tsar Michael of Russia, the Prince Alexis of Russia, Abaza Mehmed Pasha of Bosnia and the Ottoman Caliph Murad IV), with the double objectives of giving more support to the German Protestants, and to gain allies in case the Polish-Swedish War restarted, as there was a serious possibility that Poland would enter on the German main conflict.

The impact of the fighting on the Baltic trade meant various parties had been trying to mediate a diplomatic solution since 1627, chiefly the Dutch Republic. France became involved when the May 1629 Treaty of Lübeck ended Danish involvement in the Thirty Years War. As part of a general policy of undermining Emperor Ferdinand wherever possible, French chief minister Cardinal Richelieu previously funded the Danes, and now wanted to facilitate a Swedish invasion of the Holy Roman Empire.

This required peace with Poland, and after negotiations led by French envoy Hercule Charnacé, the Truce of Altmark was signed on 6 September, valid for six years. Under its terms, Gustavus evacuated Courland in return for Sigismund accepting the occupation of what later became Swedish Livonia. (Note: These territories were not formally ceded by the Commonwealth until the 1660 Treaty of Oliva) The Swedes also retained a number of Prussian ports, whose possession provided substantial toll revenues. In Royal Prussia, Sweden retained the towns of Braunsberg, Frauenberg, and Elbing. In East Prussia, Sweden retained Pillau, Fischhausen, Lochstädt, and Memel.

=== Outcome ===
Swedish historians often present the Prussian campaign as part of the wider Polish–Swedish War (1600–1629), whose end result was a significant increase in Swedish power. From this perspective, the 1626 to 1629 conflict is one element in an overall story of success, but the picture becomes more complex if viewed as a distinct event. Despite millions of riksdaler and over 30,000 deaths, the vast majority from disease, Gustavus failed to take Gdańsk, and Sweden withdrew from Prussia in 1635. Swedish historian Dick Harrison has described the Prussian campaign as a "catastrophe".

However, most historians either assess the Truce of Altmark as favorable to Sweden, or the war as a Swedish victory.

=== Treaty of Stuhmsdorf ===
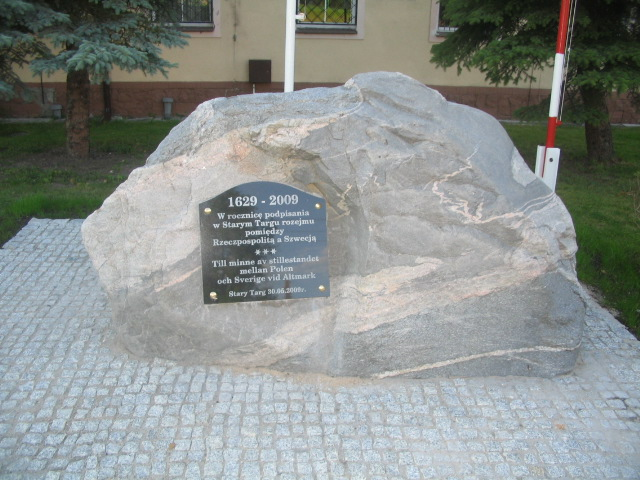
Monument commemorating the signing of the Truce of Altmark in 1629

By 1635, the political situation was very different. Gustavus died at Lützen in 1632, while defeat at Nördlingen in 1634 brought the Swedish position in Germany close to collapse, and Oxenstierna was anxious to avoid opening a new front. At the same time, Sigismund's successor Władysław IV Vasa had restored Commonwealth prestige in wars with the Ottomans and Russia, and persuaded the Sejem to approve re-opening hostilities when the truce expired.

However, much of the Polish nobility and merchant class wanted peace, which enabled Richelieu to broker an extension for 26 years and six months. On 12 September 1635, the two sides agreed the Treaty of Stuhmsdorf, with significant concessions from Oxenstierna. Along with minor territorial adjustments in Livonia, Sweden stopped levying taxes on Polish grain and withdrew from Prussia, ending the blockade which had severely damaged Gdańsk's trade.

== Sources ==
=== Bibliography ===
- Czapliński, Władysław (1976). Władysław IV i jego czasy [Władysław IV and His Times] (in Polish). PW "Wiedza Poweszechna".
- von Essen, Michael Fredholm (2020). The Lion from the North: Volume 1 The Swedish Army of Gustavus Adolphus, 1618–1632. Helion. ISBN 978-1911628576.
- Frost, Robert (2000). The Northern Wars, 1558-1721. Pearson Education. ISBN 978-0582064294.
- Isacson, Claes-Göran, ed. (2006). Vägen till Stormakt (in Swedish). Norstedts. ISBN 91-1-3015028.
- Hulsenboom, Paul (2019). "Diplomats as Poets, Poets as Diplomats. Poetic Gifts and Literary Reflections on the Dutch Mediations between Poland-Lithuania and Sweden in the First Half of the Seventeenth Century". Journal for Renaissance and Early Modern Diplomatic Studies (3): 63.
- Kamen, Henry (2000). Who's Who in Europe, 1450–1750. Routledge. ISBN 978-0415147286.
- Paradowski, Michal (2020). Despite destruction, misery and privations…: The Polish Army in Prussia during the war against Sweden 1626-1629. Helion. ISBN 978-1913336455.
- Podhorodecki, Leszek (1985). Rapier i koncerz: z dziejów wojen polsko-szwedzkich (in Polish). Książka i Wiedza. ISBN 83-05-11452-X.
- Podhorodecki, Leszek (1978). Stanisław Koniecpolski ok. 1592-1646 (in Polish). Wydawn. Ministerstwa Obrony Narodowej.
- Porshev, Boris (2014). Тридцатилетняя война и вступление в нее Швеции и Московского государства [The Thirty Years' War and the entry of Sweden and the Moscow State] (in Russian). T8. ISBN 978-5-519-03225-4.
- Wadyl, Slawomir (2025). "The Battle of Gniew Unearthed: Archaeology and the Polish-Swedish War (1626-29)". International Journal of Historical Archaeology (3). doi:10.1007/S10761-025-00793-7.
- Wetterberg, Gunnar (2002). Kanslern: Axel Oxenstierna i sin tid (in Swedish). Vol. 1. Atlantis. ISBN 978-91-7486-602-5.
- Wilson, Peter H. (2009). Europe's Tragedy: A History of the Thirty Years War. Allen Lane. ISBN 978-0-7139-9592-3.
- Bodart, Gaston (1908). Militär-historisches Kriegs-Lexikon (1618-1905) [Military-Historical War Lexicon (1618-1905)] (in German). C. W. Stern.
- Gullberg, Tom (2008). Lejonet vaknar 1611-1660 [The Lion Awakes 1611–1660]. Krigen kring Östersjön (in Swedish). Helsinki: Schildts. ISBN 9789515018229.
- DuBuis, Marc C. (2015). "Swedish Intervention and Conduct in the Thirty Years' War". Grand Valley Journal of History. 4 (1) 2.
- Wachoń, Szymon (2016). "Wojna polsko-szwedzka z lat 1626–1629 w pismach Stanisława Koniecpolskiego" [The Polish–Swedish War of 1626–1629 in the writings of Stanisław Koniecpolski]. Acta Universitatis Lodziensis. Folia Historica (in Polish). 96. University of Łódź.
- Sundberg, Ulf (2010). Sveriges krig 1448-1630 [Sweden's wars 1448-1630] (in Swedish). Svenskt militärhistoriskt bibliotek. ISBN 9789185789627.
- Purs, Aldis; Plakans, Andrejs (2017). Historical Dictionary of Latvia. Rowman & Littlefield. ISBN 9781538102213.

=== Websites ===
- Unknown, Unknown (2011). "Truce of Altmark between Sweden and Poland". The Literary Encyclopedia.
