= Prussian campaign (1626–1629) =

Campaign in Prussia during the Polish-Swedish War

- Part of the Polish–Swedish War (1626–1629)
- Ducal Prussia
Date	6 July 1626 – September 1629
Location	Royal Prussia
Result	Inconclusive (see § Aftermath)

Belligerents
Swedish Empire	(Polish–Lithuanian Commonwealth) Polish Lithuanian Commonwealth; Holy Roman Empire (Note: After 1628) (Margraviate of Brandenburg) Prussia; Danzig

Commanders and leaders
(Swedish Empire) Gustavus Adolphus (WIA) (Swedish Empire) Carl Gyllenhielm (Swedish Empire) Axel Oxenstierna (Swedish Empire) Dietrich von Falkenberg (Swedish Empire) Lennart Torstensson (Swedish Empire) Johan Banér (Swedish Empire) Jindřich Matyáš Thurn (Swedish Empire) Maximillian Teuffel (Swedish Empire) Johan Streiff (Swedish Empire) Herman Wrangel (Swedish Empire) Nils Stiernsköld † (Swedish Empire) Wolf Heinrich von Baudissin (POW)	(Polish–Lithuanian Commonwealth) Sigismund III Vasa (Polish–Lithuanian Commonwealth) Stanisław Koniecpolski (Polish–Lithuanian Commonwealth) Arend Dickmann † (Margraviate of Brandenburg) George William (Holy Roman Empire) Hans Georg von Arnim-Boitzenburg

Strength
Initial landing force 11,500; 1,209 cavalry 29 warships 31 smaller vessels 81 transport vessels 1627; 21,000; 1628; 31,000; 1629; At least 6,000–8,000	Initial force 10,000–11,000; 1627; 17,000; 1628; Presumably smaller than the Swedish force 1629; At least 7,000; 16,000 Imperial troops

Casualties and losses
30,000 dead	Heavy

The Prussian campaign (1626–1629) was a Swedish invasion of Ducal Prussia during the Polish–Swedish War (1626–1629). Despite initial success, the campaign became a war of attrition and was inconclusive. Around 30,000 or more died on the Swedish side.

== Background ==
=== Swedish conquest of Livonia ===
Despite his victory at Wallhof, Gustavus Adolphus and the Swedish leadership remained unsure of how Swedish cavalry would do against the Winged Hussars. Nevertheless, the battle cemented Sweden's conquest of Livonia.

=== Reason for the campaign ===
Danzig had long been believed to be the launch point of a Commonwealth invasion of Sweden, and Gustavus wished to move the war into Prussia, which was core territory, to put pressure on Sigismund III. An invasion there would prevent the creation of an army to invade Sweden and the supply lines in Prussia would be more favorable.

=== Preparations ===
Gustavus decided to invade Prussia in late May 1626, creating an invasion fleet of 11,500 infantry, 1,209 cavalry, 29 warships, 31 smaller vessels, and 81 transport ships.

== Campaigns ==
=== 1626 ===
In late June, the Swedish fleet arrived off Pillau. Despite being bombarded by the fortress, the Swedish landings were smooth and the fortress surrendered as the garrison of 340 could not defend it. After the fortress fell, Danzig was blockaded by Carl Gyllenhielm who established a toll into the city. The Swedes pushed into Prussia, capturing Elbing, Frauenberg, Braunsberg, Mewe, Marienburg, and Putzig despite opposition from the Elector.

Instead of besieging Danzig due to its large garrison of 5,000 men, the Swedes surrounded the city and cut it off. Two fortifications were also built at Dirschau and Gdańsk Head. An army of 4,000 men under the command of Stanislaw Koniecpolski was formed in late July to respond to the invasion. The army subsequently grew to 10,000–11,000 men in September.

==== First Battle of Mewe ====
On 11 September, Sigismund III began marching towards Mewe with 2,000 men to recapture it. Despite the city lacking a strong garrison, only some 140 Swedes and 60 burghers in total, it was strategically important as it stood between Sigismund's army and the Swedish camp at Dirschau. Gustavus subsequently marched with 2,000 infantry and 1,000–1,200 cavalry to Mewe. Skirmishes broke out at Warmhof on 22 September, which were later known as the first battle of Mewe. The fighting was inconclusive and both sides received reinforcements, increasing the Swedish force to some 9,500 men.

==== Second Battle of Mewe ====
On October 1, due to the garrison in Mewe becoming desperate from the continued siege, the Commonwealth camp was assaulted by Gustavus. During the battle, the Winged Hussars charged at the Swedish infantry, failing to make a significant impact. Due to their defeat, the Commonwealth troops lifted the siege and withdrew. The battle would later be known as the second battle of Mewe. 500 Poles and 30 Swedes died in the fighting.

==== Winter months ====
Gustavus returned to Stockholm after the battles at Mewe. During the winter, Commonwealth troops attempted to repel the Swedes from Gdańsk Head. However, all of these attempts were repelled by Johan Banér. Despite this failure, Stanislaw Koniecpolski recaptured several fortresses, including Wormditt.

=== 1627 ===
==== Siege of Puck ====
At the beginning of November 1626, the Kwarciane army under the command of Crown Field Hetman Stanisław Koniecpolski arrived in Royal Prussia. The Hetman intended to use the winter season to carry out several military operations, one of which aimed to remove the Swedish garrison from the war port in Puck.

The first attempt ended in partial success, as the Poles managed to capture the town, but the attack on the heavily fortified port was unsuccessful. In this situation, they began to blockade the town. By the end of March 1627, Koniecpolski, taking advantage of the spring floodwaters of the Vistula, which made offensive operations difficult for the Swedish troops, set out for Puck again. A siege lasting several days, supported from the sea by artillery fire from the Polish fleet led by Arend Dickmann, finally bore fruit, as part of the fortifications were destroyed, forcing the Puck garrison to capitulate.

All cannons, ammunition, and loot plundered by the Swedes in the Commonwealth fell into the hands of the Crown army.

==== Battle of Hammerstein ====
In early April, the Swedish garrison was forced to surrender after a long blockade and siege. Later, Koniecpolski intercepted a Swedish relief force of about 2,500 men under the command of Maximillian Teuffel and Johan Streiff, the relief force had been marching towards Putzig to relieve it, only to find out that the Commonwealth forces had captured it earlier and were blocking the road. An attempt by the Swedes to bypass the Poles failed. Koniecpolski intercepted the remaining troops on April 12. Even though the Polish cavalry failed to break up the fortifications set up by the Swedes, after several skirmishes, the Swedes lost hope and mutinied. On April 15, they handed over both Teuffel and Streiff, after negotiations, most of the survivors entered Commonwealth service. Both Teuffel and Streiff were later exchanged and returned to Swedish service.

==== Assault on Käsemark ====
Gustavus returned to Pillau on 8 May 1627 with new reinforcements for the army, and the Swedish army grew to 21,000, with the Commonwealth increasing their forces to 17,000. Despite this, the Poles were able to retain the field advantage, since the Swedes were forced to allocate a large portion of their forces to defending their camps. The Swedish situation had become complicated, while the Swedes remained entrenched in Gdańsk Head and Dirschau, two Commonwealth armies were deployed against them. The Swedes had imposed a blockade, but the Commonwealth forces had done the same to them. George William could not choose whose side to be on, but in the end, he chose not to support the Swedes.

Having resolved the situation with George William, Gustavus attempted to relieve the besieged camp at Gdańsk Head by carrying out a night-time amphibious assault on the Danzig-controlled bastion of Käsemark opposite Gdańsk Head. Unfortunately for the Swedes, the sentries heard the Swedes approaching and opened fire. With the Swedes losing the element of surprise, the operation failed.

In a letter to John Casimir, his brother-in-law, who had become the regent of Sweden in Gustavus' place, he wrote:

We went to the island of Hoefft, the enemy was just over against us on the Dantzic side, and began to play upon us with his cannon. Johan Baner and Count Thurn were to lead the first attack, and I was to second them with the pikemen. We were all divided into our respective boats, and all would have gone well if my fellows had obeyed orders; but only one boat (Axel Duvall's) reached the opposite bank. The others mostly got stuck on a sandbank, and one division of boats rowed in the wrong direction. So I jumped into a little boat to set the matter right. And because it is apt to get rather hot on such occasions, I was actually hit in the belly by a shot. But I have God to thank that it has not endangered my life or my health, and I hope in a few days to be able to direct the work again.

— Gustavus Adolphus

==== Battle of Morungen ====
The Swedish camp became worried when they were notified of a force of 1,800 Prussians that were sent by George William against them. Sigismund had earlier put pressure on him to intervene, either by recapturing Pillau or sending his troops to help Sigismund in battle. The two armies met at Morungen, the battle began, and the Prussians quickly entered Swedish service. The Prussian troops would later form the Yellow Regiment.

==== Battle of Dirschau ====
After several more inconclusive attempts against Danzig, Gustavus began moving against Koniecpolski. The Swedes gathered at their old camp at Dirschau. Gustavus wanted to see how the Swedish cavalry held up against Commonwealth forces in a battle. On 17 August, the battle began, with the Swedish cavalry attacking the Polish hussars, as they had earlier begun a retreat into the camp. The Commonwealth fought hard, but the Swedes were able to push them back. However, since night was approaching, Gustavus had to call off the battle for the next day.

The next day, Gustavus resumed the battle, since he knew that reinforcements for the Commonwealth forces were on the way. However, in the beginning, when he rode out to see how the battle proceeded, he was shot and wounded in the right shoulder. When night began approaching, the Swedes halted their advance. Nonetheless, this was the first battle where the Swedish cavalry decisively defeated the Polish hussars, and the Swedish army was no longer inferior to the Commonwealth's.

After the battle, Koniecpolski remained indecisive despite reinforcements from Wallenstein's army. The years of campaigning also made the Swedish army more experienced; if these improvements had not taken place, it is unlikely that the Swedes would have made an impact in the Thirty Years War.

==== Battle of Oliwa ====
Danzig continued its resistance, despite the Swedish blockade, and the Commonwealth forces in Danzig contested it. On 28 November a battle took place off Oliwa near Danzig between 10 Commonwealth and 6 Swedish warships. The Swedes lost 2 ships, and the two admirals, Nils Stiernsköld, and the Commonwealth admiral, Arend Dickmann, fell in the battle. Due to the cold weather, Danzig was not able to exploit the victory.

==== End of the year ====
At the end of 1627, Sigismund was in a precarious situation. The one thing preventing him from making peace were the Catholic victories in the then ongoing Thirty Years' War. The war was not popular in the Commonwealth either; most of the people saw the war as personal for Sigismund and that his claim to the Swedish throne was not a problem for Poland.

=== 1628 ===
==== Battle of Weichselmünde ====
Gustavus Adolphus and fresh reinforcements arrived on May 15, 1628. The Swedish army in Poland then numbered over 31,000 men, the largest force Gustavus had commanded to that point. The Commonwealth forces had also been worn down to such a point that they were avoiding open battle, and focused on raiding the Swedes. and in late July, Gustavus carried out a surprise attack on Weichselmünde near Danzig. He brought 25 artillery pieces, all being leather cannons, across ground that Commonwealth forces thought was impassable. For several hours he carried out an artillery duel against the Commonwealth fleet. The Commonwealth navy lost 3 warships, but the remaining managed to take cover in Danzig's port and ensuing rain saved the fleet from further damage. The heavy rain would continue to August, imobilizing both armies.

==== End of the year ====
On the 8 August, after the rain had stopped, Gustavus once again set out to meet Koniecpolski in open battle, but Koniecpolski refuses and remains entrenched. Koniecpolski also enacted a scorched earth policy, which affected the Swedes heavily. The only battle would be the Battle of Ostróda, where Koniecpolski successfully ambushed a newly recruited cavalry force under Heinrich von Baudissin. Gustavus also managed to capture a number of Commonwealth strongholds, with Swedish reconnaissance expeditions also passing by Warsaw. Having failed to defeat Koniecpolski, Gustavus handed over command to Herman Wrangel and returned to Sweden for the winter.

=== 1629 ===
==== Battle of Górzno ====
In the beginning of the year, Herman Wrangel decided to reinforce the stores of Strassburg, which was besieged by the Commonwealth. On 30 January he set out with an army of 6,000-8,000 towards Koniecpolski's army, which was made up of around 6,000-7,000. Koniecpolski himself was not present, and the army was instead led by Stanisław Rewera Potocki.

The two armies faced each other on 2 February, and the battle would begin on the left flank with cavalry under Maximillian Teuffel engaging with Polish cavalry. The German cavalry quickly begin retreating but the Polish cavalry remained and fought bravely. However, they would also quickly be overwhelmed and forced into a retreat. At the same time, the Commonwealth center would advance, but are quickly threatened by four Swedish cavalry squadrons. With this, the Commonwealth forces began retreating, with the Swedes following close behind.

===== Aftermath of Górzno =====
With the defeat at Gorzno, fear spread through the commonwealth, although the Swedes were not able to exploit the victory. The Sejm had however changed their attitude after the defeat, and allowed an Imperial army under the command of Hans Georg von Arnim-Boitzenburg to reinforce the Commonwealth. The effective strength of the army was around 16,000. Despite mistrust between them, Koniecpolski and Arnim worked together on a joint plan. On June 25, they united their armies at Graudenz, and they decided to cut Gustavus' communication lines to the north. At the same time, Gustavus would return to the front. He received intelligence on the joint Commonwealth-Imperial operations and correctly deduced that they were attempting to cut him off from the north.

==== Battle of Trzciana ====
After Gustavus set out with his army against the Imperial-Commonwealth force, he misjudged which route they were taking, he moved north towards Stuhm with his army, which then consisted of 1,300 foot, and 5,400 cavalry. The two armies met in Honigfelde (modern day Trzciano, which the Swedes misjudged to be Stuhm.) Gustavus quickly ordered a delaying action to allow time for his troops to retreat, their situation was critical, but nonetheless, Gustavus managed to save most of his units. One notable loss is Gustavus' hat, which the Imperials took as a war trophy. Despite the successful retreat of most of the Swedish units, the battle is considered a Swedish defeat. Gustavus later described the battle in the following words:

"Never have I experienced a hotter bath!"

— Gustavus Adolphus

===== Aftermath of Trzciana =====
After the battle, the Prussian campaign ended in a strategic stalemate, with either side being able to inflict a decisive victory on the other, and distrust started building in the Imperial-Commonwealth army, with Sigismund not trusting the Imperials, and the Imperial army being short on everything. On August 19, the Commonwealth forces would depart from their fortified camp, and the Swedes managed to successfully assault the Commonwealth rearguard, capturing 300 wagons, along with the entire army's gunpowder stockpile, this would turn out to be the last battle in the war.

== Aftermath ==
In September 1629, Sweden and the Commonwealth signed the six-year long Truce of Altmark, this had been pushed by England, France, and the Dutch Republic. It could be no more than a truce, since Sigismund refused to relinquish his claim on the Swedish throne.

=== Results of the truce ===
As a result of the truce, the Swedes gained de facto control of Livonia north of the Daugava, they also retained control of the important Prussian coastal towns of Braunsberg, Elbing, and Frauenberg, in addition, the Swedes received the east Prussian towns of Pillau, Fischhausen, Lochstädt, and Memel. More importantly, the Swedes also acquired the right to the main share of the tolls levied on the Danzig trade.
