= Battle of Wallhof =

Battle of the 1626 Polish-Swedish war

- Part of the Polish–Swedish War (1626–1629)
- Contemporary engraving of the battle
| Date | 17 January 1626 |
| Location | Valle, Latvia (German: Wallhof), (present-day Valle Parish, Bauska Municipality, Latvia) 56°31′00″N 24°44′00″E |
| Result | Swedish victory |

Belligerents
| Swedish Empire | Polish–Lithuanian Commonwealth |

Commanders and leaders
| (Swedish Empire) Gustavus Adolphus | (Polish–Lithuanian Commonwealth) Jan Stanisław Sapieha |

Strength
| 2,800 infantry, 2,100 cavalry, 6 cannons | Between 2,000 and 7,000 men (infantry & cavalry); 5 cannons |

Casualties and losses
| Very light, some sources claim not a single man dead or missing | 1,000 killed or wounded 150 men captured along with 3 cannons |

Battle of Wallhof (Latvian: Valles kauja, also known as Battle of Walmojza) was fought between Sweden and the Polish-Lithuanian Commonwealth on 17 January 1626.

== History ==
Swedish forces consisting of 4,900 men (2,100 of them cavalry) with six guns under Gustavus II Adolphus ambushed and took by surprise a Polish-Lithuanian force of 2,000–7,000 men (sources differ) with three guns under Jan Stanisław Sapieha. Polish-Lithuanian casualties amounted to between 500 and 1,000 or between 1,000 and 2,300 killed, wounded, or captured; their commander collapsed from mental illness after this defeat.
The Swedish king Gustav claimed: "not a single man is missing; everyone is where they should be" which is hard to believe, but to have suffered very small casualties is most likely true.

In the battle Gustavus Adolphus' reformed tactics, utilising close cooperation between infantry and cavalry, were tried for the first time. It was also the first time the Swedish cavalry successfully withstood the Polish cavalry.

The Swedes attacked the Lithuanian camp at dawn and, since the camp was located between two woods, the Lithuanian cavalry could not outflank the Swedes. Instead, the Swedes used the woods to fire upon the Lithuanian cavalry charge.

== Sources ==
- https://twojahistoria.pl/encyklopedia/leksykon-bitew/bitwa-pod-walmojzami-16-stycznia-1626/
- "Wallhof" in Nordisk familjebok (2nd edition, 1921)
- Sundberg, Ulf: Svenska krig 1521–1814, pp. 109–112, Hjalmarson & Högberg Bokförlag, Stockholm 2002, ISBN 91-89660-10-2
- Gullberg, Tom: Krigen kring Östersjön – Lejonet vaknar 1611–1660, pp. 50–52, Schildts Förlags AB, Helsinki 2008, ISBN 978-951-50-1822-9
