= Netherlands–Sweden relations =

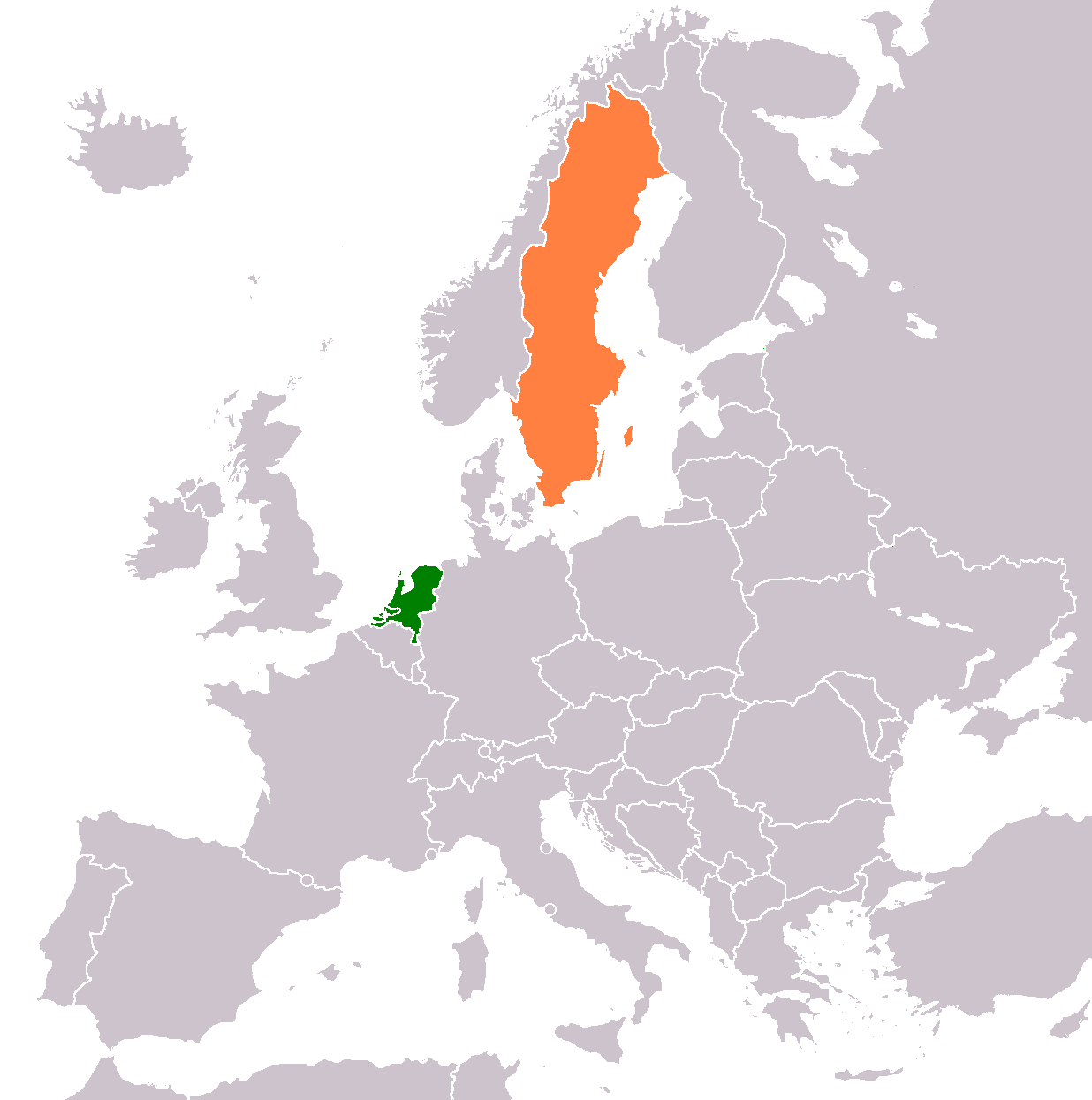
- Netherlands: Sweden

Sweden and the Netherlands maintain bilateral relations. The original Dutch Republic and the Kingdom of Sweden have been both allied and on opposing sides in war. Both countries are full members of the Council of Europe, Joint Expeditionary Force, NATO and the European Union. The Netherlands have an embassy in Stockholm, while Sweden has an embassy in The Hague. On 18 May 2022, the Netherlands welcomed the NATO applications of Finland and Sweden and pledged full support; Sweden subsequently became a member on 7 March 2024.

== History ==
=== Early relations: friendship ===
Modern Sweden is commonly dated to 1523, and the Dutch Republic (literally the Republic of the Seven United Netherlands) was established in 1588. In the seventeenth century, Sweden, often called the Swedish Empire, expanded through conquests in Finland, the Baltic region and Germany, while the Dutch Republic, already in its Golden Age since its establishment, led Europe in trade, scientific advances, art and overseas colonisation. Dutch power rested on Amsterdam’s commercial system and its strategic role moving Baltic grain to southern Europe and connecting Atlantic routes to the Americas, whereas Sweden’s ascent drew on military strength and exports of copper and iron. The Netherlands was densely settled and urban; Sweden was sparsely populated and agrarian. These contrasts made their partnership particularly useful. One author argues that seventeenth-century Swedish–Dutch relations were asymmetrical, with Sweden’s Baltic predominance ultimately hinging on the Dutch Republic’s economic clout and the choices of its mercantile elites.

Between 1607 and 1611, the Swedish Crown tried to bind the Netherlands closer by building Göteborg as a Dutch-populated port to tap Dutch trade networks at the Göta älv. The plan faltered due to labour shortages and the small part completed was burned by Danish troops.

After Denmark’s victory over Sweden in the Kalmar War (1611–1613), Denmark barred Dutch traffic to Sweden and sharply raised the Sound Dues, threatening the Dutch Republic’s Baltic trade. To keep the Baltic open, the Dutch concluded anti-Danish agreements with the Hanseatic League (1613) and with Sweden through the Treaty of The Hague in 1614. These steps anchored early Dutch–Swedish cooperation against Danish dominance in the western Baltic. Under the Treaty of the Hague, Sweden and the Dutch Republic entered into a 15-year defensive alliance, pledged to protect their liberties and rights in the Baltic Sea and North Sea, agreed to exchange ambassadors, and the Dutch Republic recognised Sweden’s claim to control over the Baltic Sea, called dominium maris baltici.

Sweden’s first ambassador to the Netherlands was the Dutch-born councillor Jacob van Dyk who had been involved in the treaty negotiations. His main task was to raise Dutch loans to Sweden, both to fund the Älvsborg ransom imposed after Sweden’s defeat in the Kalmar War and to finance Sweden’s war in Poland. He obtained the funds, but repayment disputes led Gustav II Adolf to recall him in 1620.

Economic ties between Sweden and the Dutch Republic were mixed. Swedish campaigns in the eastern Baltic repeatedly disrupted commerce—blockading Prussian and eastern Baltic ports and interrupting transit trade, yet Sweden’s home market relied heavily on foreign capital and Amsterdam’s financial services. Dutch industrialists such as Louis De Geer and Trip made fortunes in Sweden’s iron and copper sectors and export trade. Their expertise helped improve bar-iron production, which in turn enabled a domestic arms industry and, eventually, significant weapons exports. Dutch entrepreneurs and Swedish elites sponsored Dutch-style architecture in Sweden, while broader exchange saw nobles importing books, artworks, and luxury goods from the Netherlands; in the later seventeenth century, Dutch influence also revitalised Stockholm’s theatre. By the 1640s, Sweden had become the Republic’s leading Baltic partner: about half of Sweden’s imports moved through Amsterdam’s staple market, and the Dutch Republic took all Swedish copper, roughly 40% of its iron, and around 75% of Finnish tar.

=== Early relations: wars ===
In the meantime in the U.S., there had been escalating tensions between the Dutch and the Swedes. In September 1655, Dutch soldiers from New Netherland under the command of Peter Stuyvesant conquered the Delaware River colony of New Sweden. Under the terms of surrender all Swedish settlements were incorporated into the Dutch colony.

In Europe, Swedish forces laid siege to Danzig in 1656, a port vital to the Dutch grain trade. The Dutch sent ships and troops to aid the city, after which the Swedes withdrew and the Treaty of Elbing was signed. Under that agreement, Sweden, with limited exceptions, undertook not to levy higher tolls on Dutch ships than on its own.

A conflict broke out among the Dutch Republic, Denmark, and Sweden around the Baltic, a trade corridor crucial to all three countries. The Dutch profited from Swedish iron and from Polish grain and timber, and they had an arrangement with Denmark for lower Sound tolls. Denmark’s revenues depended on dues from traffic through the Sound. In 1658 Sweden moved to assert control over the Baltic; Denmark resisted. The Swedish attempt imperilled Dutch trade in the region, and the Dutch Republic intervened on Denmark's side in the 1658-1660 Dano–Swedish War, known in the Netherlands as the Swedish–Dutch War. Sweden succeeded in conquering a large part of Denmark, but the Dutch, led in part by Michiel de Ruyter, broke the blockade, freed Copenhagen, and destroyed the Swedish fleet.

The Second Anglo–Dutch War began in 1665 as a naval conflict between England and the Dutch Republic. Owing in part to Swedish diplomacy, negotiations in Breda produced a treaty that ended the war in 1667. The next year, worried by France's expanding power, the Dutch Republic, England and Sweden formed a defensive triple alliance. However, in 1672 Sweden and France signed the treaty of Stockholm, and when France that same year invaded the Dutch republic and started the Franco-Dutch War, Sweden eventually fought on France's side. The Dutch Republic sought support from Denmark–Norway, and in 1675 they opened hostilities against Sweden, launching the Scanian War. After early gains in which large areas were seized, Sweden eventually prevailed and the conquered territory was returned. Peaceful relations between Sweden and the Dutch Republic soon steadied and commerce resumed, with improved ties prompting a rebound in Dutch traffic through the Sound. However, Sweden’s protectionist policies reduced the Dutch foothold in its markets.

In the Great Northern War (1700–1721) a coalition led by Russia successfully contested the supremacy of Sweden in Northern, Central and Eastern Europe. During the first years, the Dutch allied itself with Sweden and fought on its side. In the second half of the war, the Dutch republic needed to protect its merchant vessels against Swedish attacks and confiscations, many times in vain. This gradually cooled the friendship between the two countries. Sweden lost this war, ceding its eastern Baltic provinces and parts of Finnish Karelia. This meant the end of their Great Power era. Also the Dutch republic lacked the resources to maintain its previous leading position.

=== Waning ties ===
During the eighteenth century, the once-close political association between Sweden and the Dutch Republic came to an end, and commercial ties waned as well. In the late 1730s about one-fifth of Sweden’s trade was with the Dutch, but by the 1790s the share had fallen below ten per cent, leaving the Dutch Republic a minor trading partner to Sweden.

From 1721 to 1814, Sweden fought four major wars: the War of the Hats with Russia (1741–1743), the Pomeranian War with Prussia (1757–1762), the Russo–Swedish War (1788–1790), and the Finnish War (1808–1809) as well as several minor wars. It underwent the 1772 coup d’état of Gustav III, ending the Age of Liberty. None of this involved the Dutch Republic or its successor states.

During the same period, the Dutch fought in the War of the Austrian Succession (1740–1748), the Fourth Anglo-Dutch War (1780–1784), and the French Revolutionary and Napoleonic Wars (1795–1814). The Dutch Republic became the Batavian Republic in 1795 and in 1806 the Kingdom of Holland. Sweden neither fought against the Dutch nor alongside them in these conflicts, though it was involved elsewhere in the Napoleonic Wars.

== the European Union and NATO ==
While the Netherlands was one of the founding members of the European Union (EU), Sweden joined the European Union (EU) on 1 January 1995. The Netherlands was one of the founding members of NATO. In July 2022, the Netherlands fully ratified Sweden's NATO membership application and Sweden joined NATO on 7 March 2024.

== Resident diplomatic missions ==
- the Netherlands has an embassy in Stockholm.
- Sweden has an embassy in The Hague.
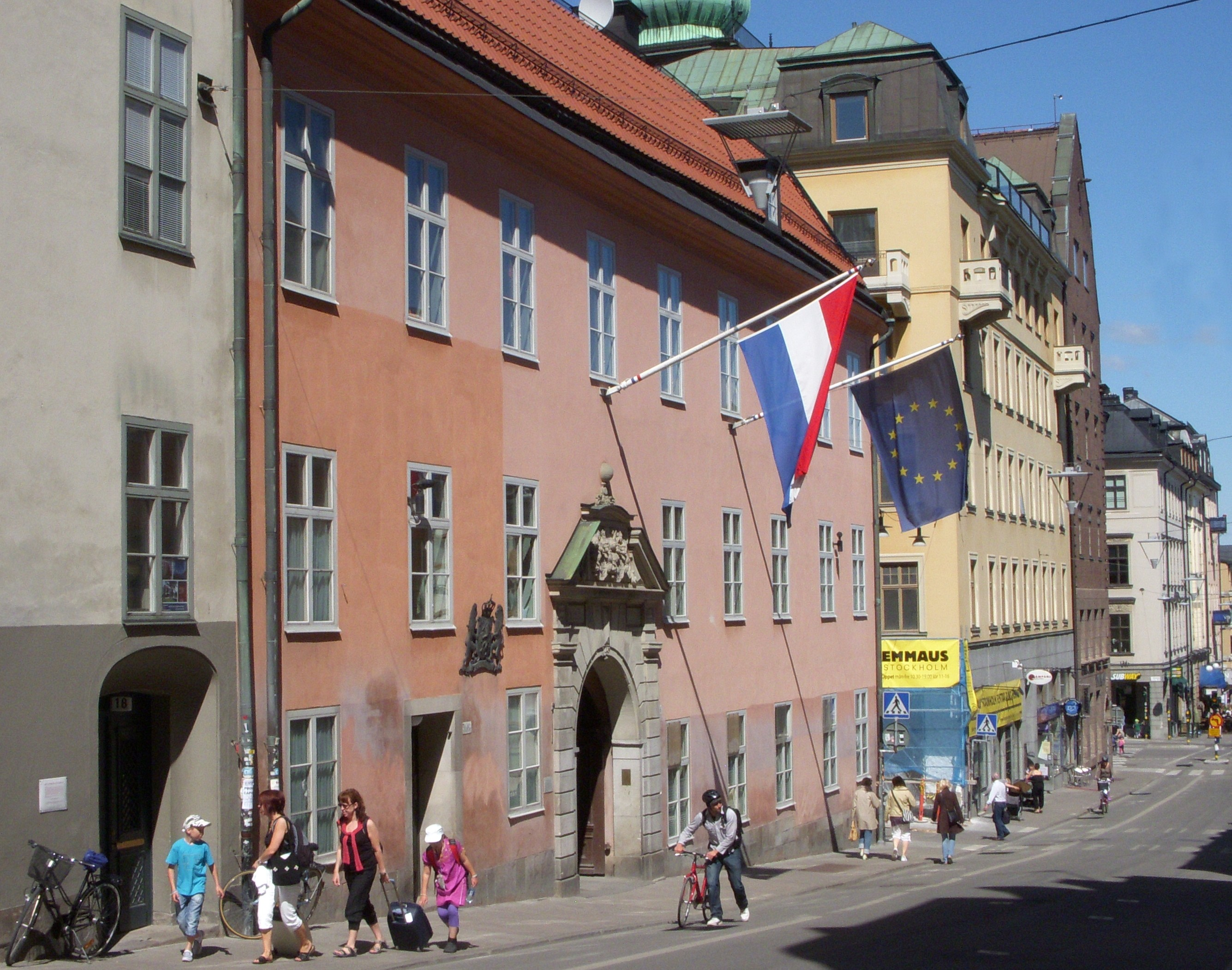
Embassy of the Netherlands in Stockholm

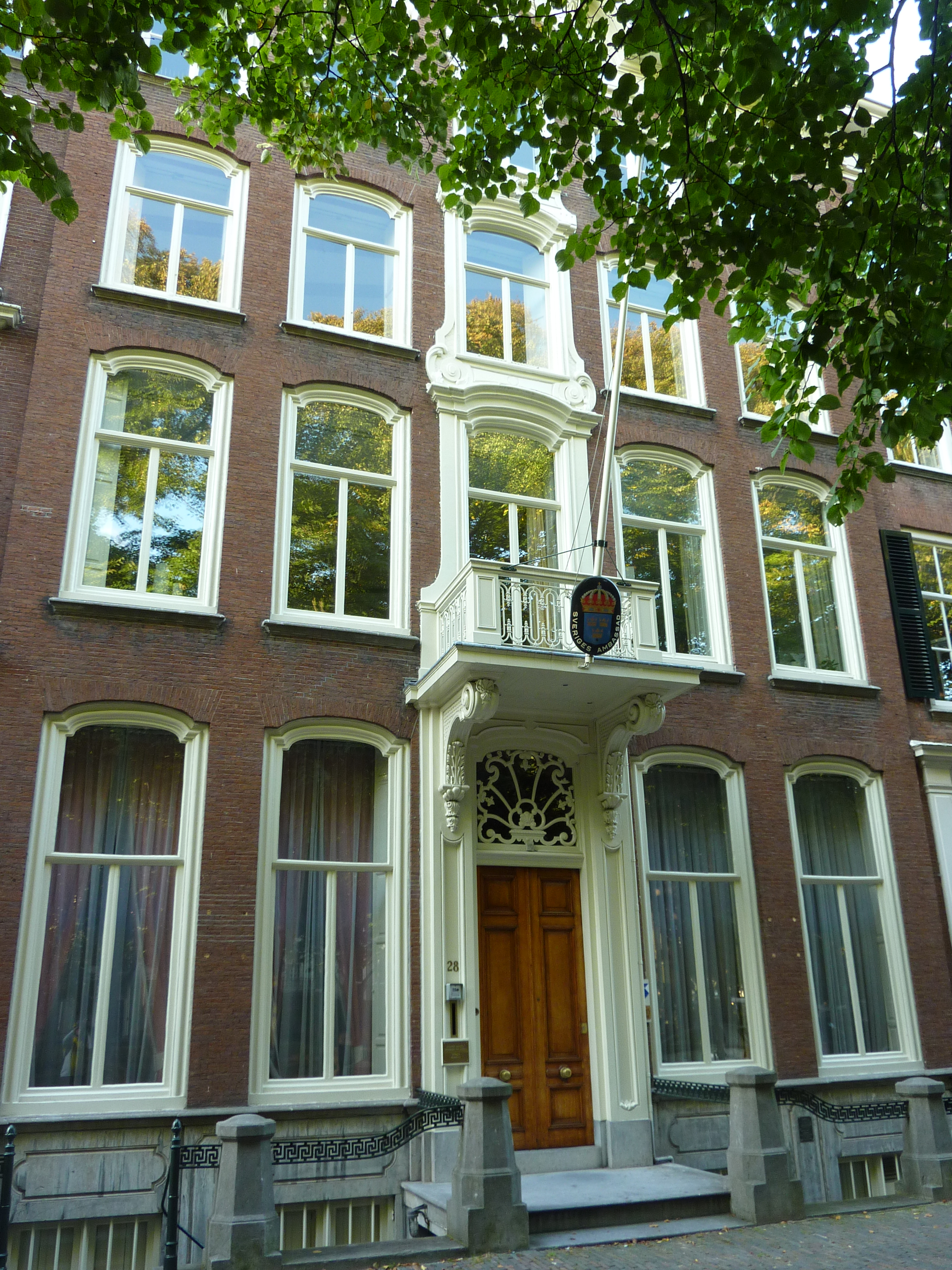
Residence of the Swedish ambassador in The Hague

== See also ==
- Foreign relations of the Netherlands
- Foreign relations of Sweden
