= Dominium maris =

Dominium maris (lat. for "sea dominion") can refer to several Late Middle Ages policies of seafaring European states:

- Dominium maris baltici ("Baltic Sea dominion")
- Dominium maris septentrionalis ("Northern Seas dominion")
