= Treaty of Knäred =

1613 treaty ending the Kalmar War between Denmark-Norway and Sweden

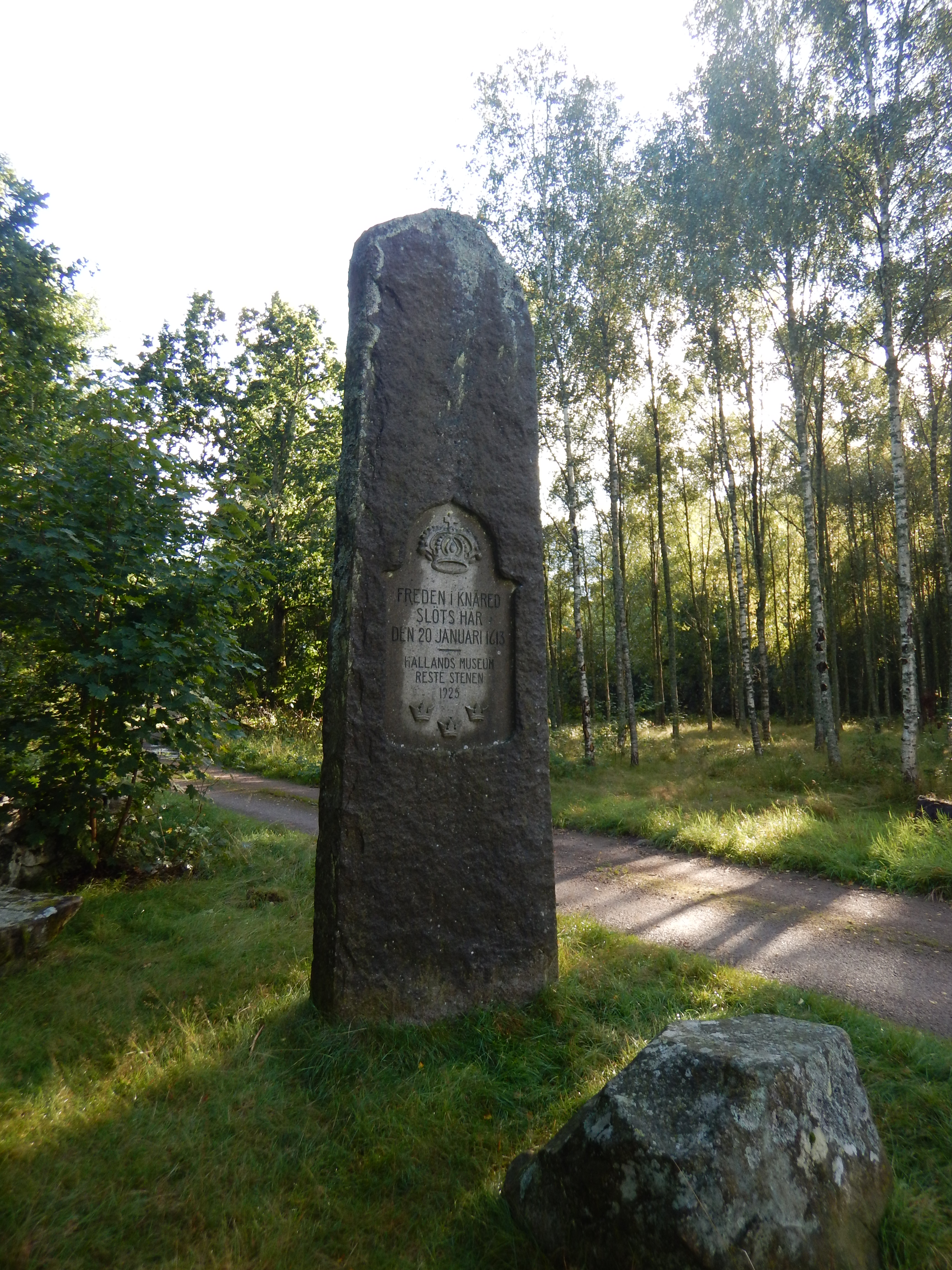
Memorial stone in Sjöared, Halland

The Treaty of Knäred (Danish: Freden i Knærød, Swedish: Freden i Knäred) was signed on 21 January 1613 and ended the Kalmar War (1611–1613) between Denmark-Norway and Sweden. The peace negotiations came about under an English initiative. The peace was guaranteed by King James I of England and VI of Scotland.

The treaty was named after the village of Knäred in Halland, where it was signed at a border bridge in what was then the Danish Halland. The peace meant that the kingdoms restored the conquests made during the war. Under the terms of the treaty, Sweden would give back Jemtland and Herjedalen to Norway. Denmark-Norway would give back Borgholm, Kalmar and Öland.

As a result, Sweden also had to pay the Älvsborg Ransom of one million Rixdollars for the return of the fortress of Älvsborg. The ransom was paid by 1619.

A memorial stone over the site was erected between Knäred and Markaryd in 1925 by the Halland Art Museum (Hallands konstmuseum).

== See also ==
- Dominium maris baltici
- List of Danish wars
- List of Swedish wars
- List of treaties
