= Concert of The Hague (1659) =

Treaty between England, France, and the Netherlands on the Second Northern War

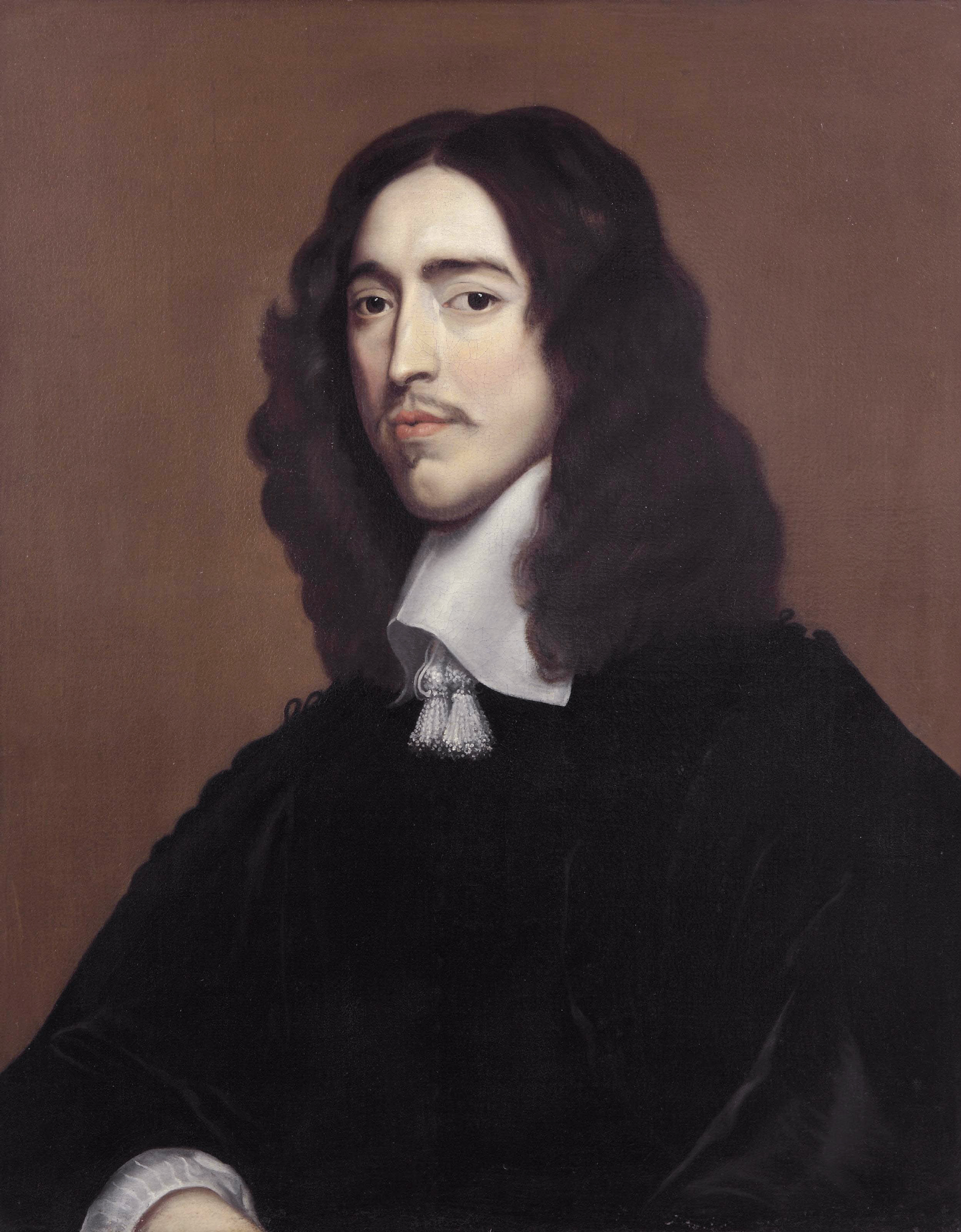
Johan de Witt

The Concert of The Hague, signed on 21 May 1659, was an outline of the common stance of England, France and the Dutch Republic regarding the Second Northern War. The powers agreed that the Swedish Empire and Denmark–Norway should settle for a peace treaty based on the Treaty of Roskilde, including free navigation through The Sound and the Baltic Sea based on the Treaty of Elbing. The subsequent Dano-Swedish Peace of Copenhagen largely followed the terms dictated by the Concert of the Hague.

The concert was preceded by two Dutch interventions against Sweden in the Second Northern War, the first being the relief of Danzig (Gdansk) in 1656 that led to the treaty of Elbing, the second being the relief of Copenhagen in 1658. The driving force behind the treaty was Dutch Johan De Witt, protecting Dutch interests in the Baltic Sea, and the concert agreed to have the Dutch fleet enact pressure to impose the envisioned peace terms on Denmark and Sweden. England likewise had trade interests in the Baltic Sea and was willing to protect them by force. De Witt's attempts to turn the concert into a formal alliance was only in part successful, as negotiations with France resulted in a Franco-Dutch alliance in 1662 which became important during the Second Anglo-Dutch War, but negotiations with England did not result in an alliance due to disagreements over the freedom of seas.

== Sources ==
=== Bibliography ===
- Frijhoff, Willem; Spies, Marijke (2004). Dutch Culture in a European Perspective. 1650, hard-won unity. Dutch Culture in a European Perspective. Vol. 1. Uitgeverij Van Gorcum. ISBN 90-232-3963-6.
- Frost, Robert I (2004). After the Deluge. Poland-Lithuania and the Second Northern War, 1655–1660. Cambridge Studies in Early Modern History. Cambridge University Press. ISBN 0-521-54402-5.
- Rowen, Herbert H. (2003). John de Witt. Statesman of the 'True Freedom'. Cambridge University Press. ISBN 0-521-52708-2.
- Treasure, Geoffrey (1985). The making of modern Europe, 1648–1780. Taylor & Francis. ISBN 0-416-72370-5.
- Van der Bijl, Murk (1995). "Johann Moritz von Nassau-Siegen (1604–1679). Eine vermittelnde Persönlichkeit". In Lademacher, Horst (ed.). Oranien-Nassau, die Niederlande und das Reich. Beiträge zur Geschichte einer Dynastie. Niederlande-Studien (in German). Vol. 13. LIT. pp. 125–154. ISBN 3-8258-2276-1.
