= Friso (disambiguation) =

Friso was a legendary Frisian king.

Friso can also refer to:

== People ==
=== Surname ===
- Alvise dal Friso (Luigi Benfatto; 1551–1611), Italian painter
- Enzo Friso (born 1927), Italian trade union leader
- John William Friso, Prince of Orange and Stadtholder of Friesland and Groningen
- William Charles Henry Friso (1711–1751), Prince of Orange and stadtholder of the Netherlands

=== First name ===
- Prince Friso of Orange-Nassau (1968–2013), second son of Queen Beatrix of the Netherlands and Claus von Amsberg.
- Friso Mando (born 1990), Surinamese footballer
- Friso Meeter (1936–2025), Dutch lawyer and politician
- Friso Nijboer (born 1965), Dutch chess player
- Friso Wielenga (born 1956), Dutch historian
- Friso de Zeeuw (born 1952), Dutch jurist, professor and politician

== See also ==
- Jan Friso Groote (born 1965), Dutch computer scientist
- Regiment Infanterie Johan Willem Friso of the Royal Netherlands Army
- Royal Military Band "Johan Willem Friso" of the Netherlands
