= Älvsborg Bridge =

Älvsborgsbron
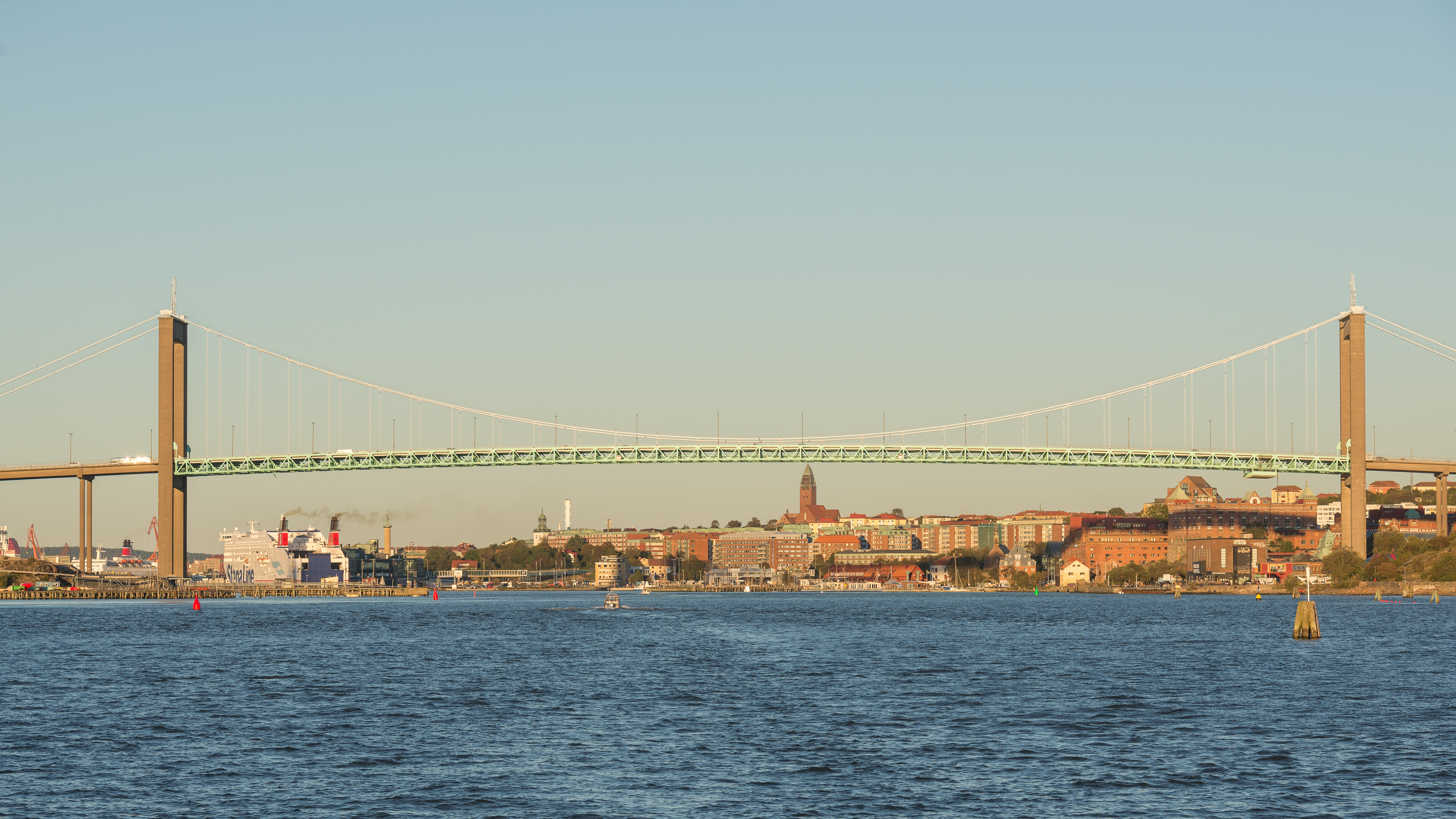
- Coordinates: 57.691°N 11.902°E
- Carries: Six lanes of traffic, pedestrians and bicycles
- Crosses: Göta Älv
- Locale: Gothenburg
- Maintained by: Swedish Transport Administration

Characteristics
- Design: Suspension
- Total length: 933 m
- Height: 107 m
- Longest span: 417 m
- Clearance below: 45 m

History
- Construction start: Autumn 1963
- Construction end: December 1967
- Opened: November 8, 1966

Statistics
- Daily traffic: 65 000

Location
- Interactive map of Älvsborgsbron

The Älvsborg Bridge (Swedish: Älvsborgsbron) is a suspension bridge over Göta älv in Gothenburg, Sweden, connecting the island of Hisingen with the mainland. It was designed by Sven Olof Asplund, and inaugurated on 8 November 1966 by Swedish communication minister Olof Palme. The total length of the bridge is 933 metres and the distance between the pylons ("main span") is 417 metres, while the clearance below the deck is 45 metres. This clearance is well below the international standard for the largest cruise ships (65 metres), so many such ships have to dock outside the bridge. The pylons are 107 metres tall, making the bridge one of Gothenburg's most prominent landmarks. It takes its name from the mediaeval castle of Old Älvsborg, the ruins of which are located just a couple of hundred metres along the riverbank from the southern pylon.

The bridge was painted green for the 1995 World Championships in Athletics, which Gothenburg hosted. Work started in 1993 and used about 36,000 litres of paint.

The bridge acted as the finish line for the 2005–06 and 2014–2015 Volvo Ocean Race.
