= Treaty of The Hague (1614) =

Alliance treaty between the Dutch and Swedes

- Type: Defensive and maritime treaty
- Signed: 1614
- Location: The Hague
- Parties: (Swedish Empire) Sweden; Dutch Republic

The Treaty of The Hague (1614) was a defensive and maritime treaty signed between the Netherlands and Sweden in 1614. It had some special significance due to the fact it was connected to a somewhat earlier alliance between the Dutch and Lübeck. It remained in effect for fifteen years.

== Stipulations ==
- A defensive alliance to last 15 years is established between Sweden and the Dutch.
- The two powers pledge to try and protect their liberties and rights in the Baltic Sea and North Sea.
- Both countries would exchange ambassadors to each other.
- The Dutch recognize the Swedish claim to Dominium maris baltici

== See also ==
- Netherlands–Sweden relations
