= Siege of Älvsborg (1439) =

Siege of Älvsborg in 1439

- Part of Karl Knutsson's campaign against Eric of Pomerania
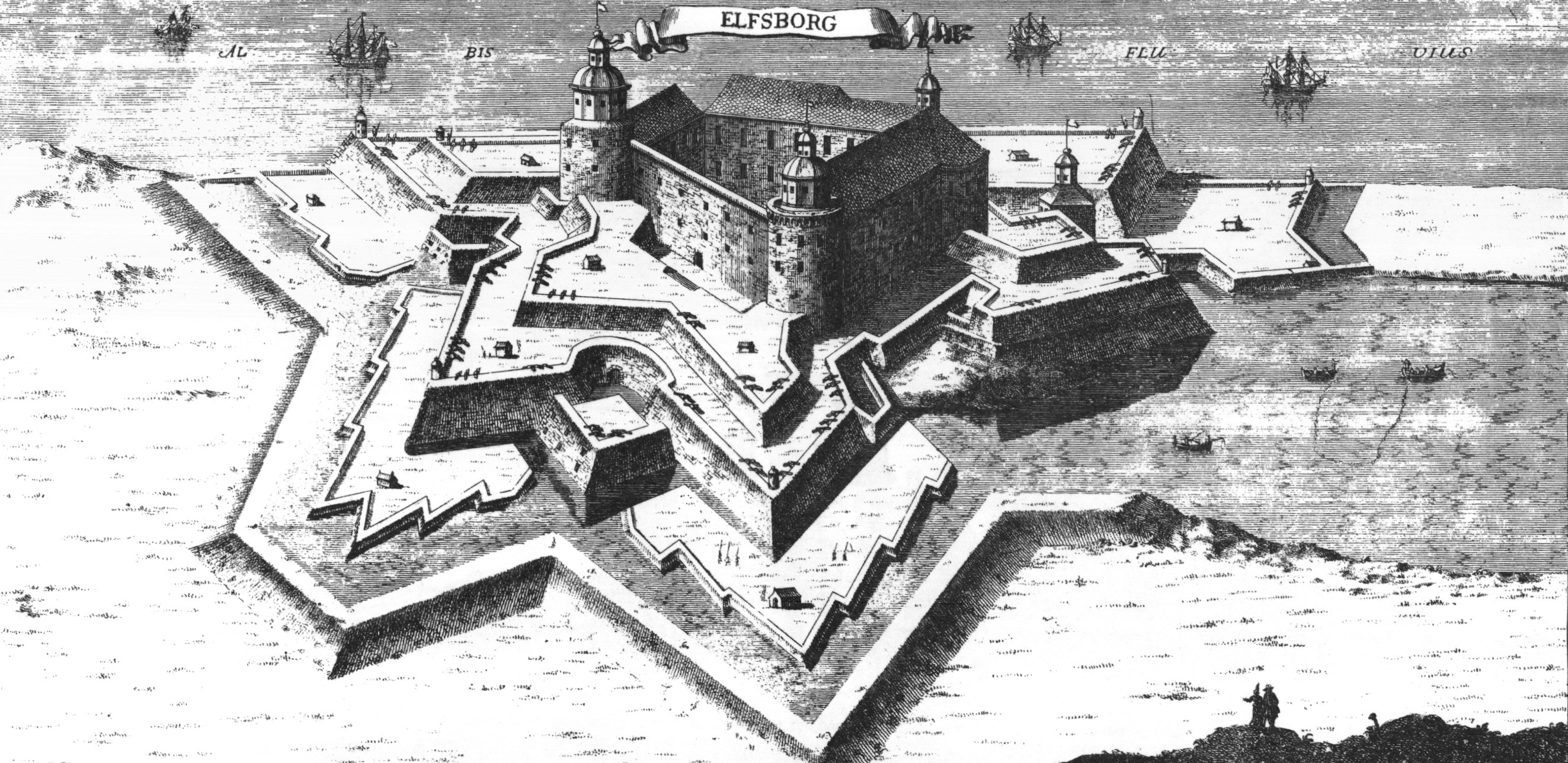
- View of Älvsborg Fortress in the Suecia Antiqua et Hodierna
Date	Summer 1439 – ? (10 weeks)
Location	Älvsborg, Sweden 57°41′23″N 11°54′26″E
Result	Swedish victory
Territorial changes	Norwegians retreat from Älvsborg

Belligerents
(History of Sweden (800–1521)) Sweden	(Kingdom of Norway (872–1397)) Norway

Commanders and leaders
(History of Sweden (800–1521)) Ture Turesson	(Kingdom of Norway (872–1397)) Johan Umreise (Kingdom of Norway (872–1397)) Olaf Buk †

Units involved
(History of Sweden (800–1521)) Älvsborg garrison (History of Sweden (800–1521)) Relief force	(Kingdom of Norway (872–1397)) Unknown

Strength
Garrison; Unknown Relief force Likely large	700 men

Casualties and losses
8 taken hostage	200 killed Several wounded and captured

The siege of Älvsborg (Swedish: Belägringen av Älvsborg; Norwegian: Beleiringen av Älvsborg) occurred in 1439, beginning in the summer and lasting 10 weeks. It eventually ended with a Norwegian retreat after a relief force led by Ture Turesson attacked the besiegers.

== Background ==
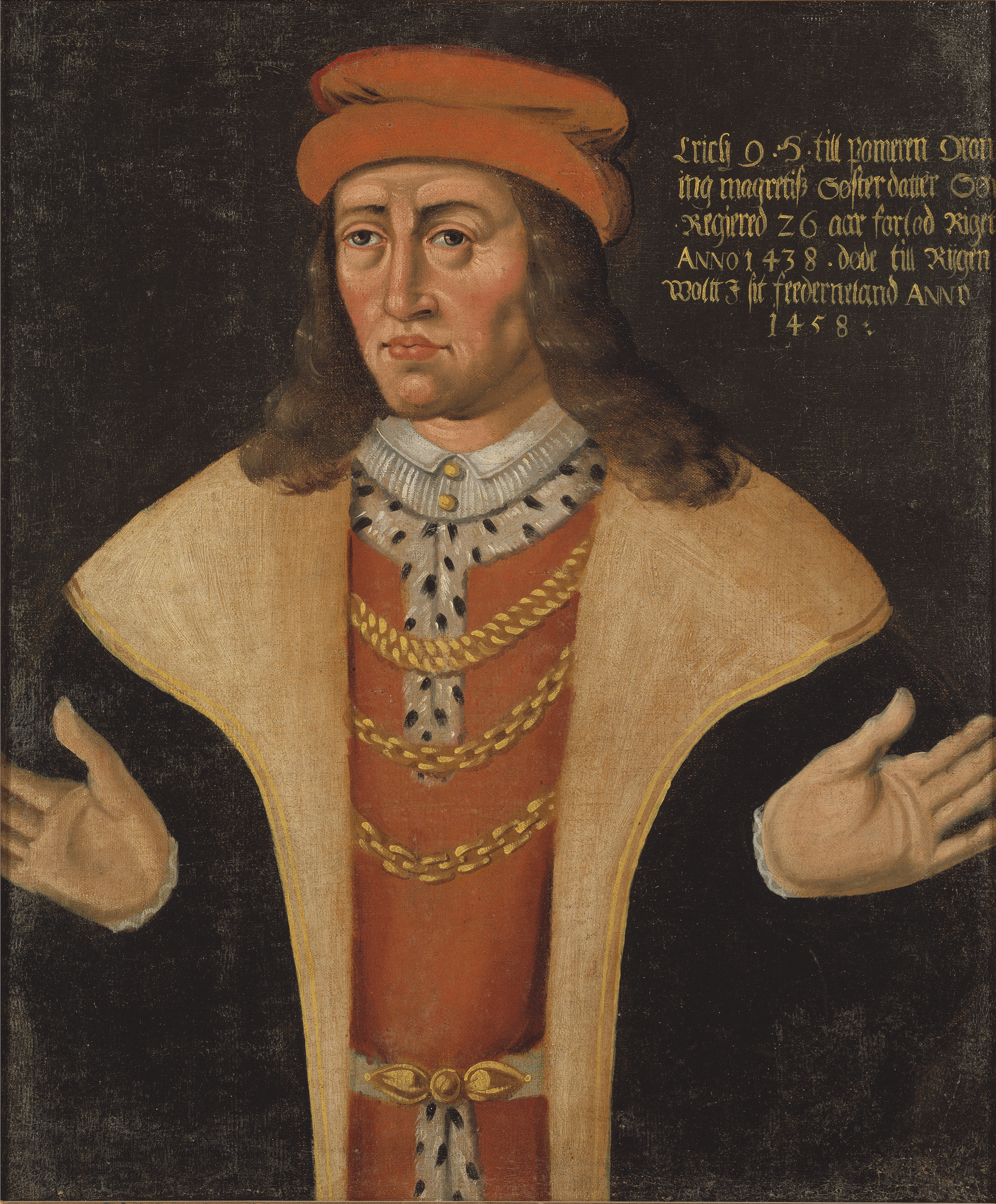
Erik of Pomerania (1382–1459)

The years in the aftermath of the Engelbrekt rebellion were very uneasy in Sweden. From the perspective of the Swedes, they did not know exactly what to support, being whether to return to the Kalmar Union or to elect a new Swedish king. After a while, they did however decide that under all circumstances, all fortresses were to be controlled by "trustable Swedish men".

This action would require fighting with certain Swedes who were not loyal to Karl Knutsson, and Eric of Pomeranians men still held multiple castles around Sweden. The campaign against Eric would be led by Karl Knutsson.

=== Prelude ===
In the spring of 1439, Eric of Pomerania had resumed his relations with the Norwegians, after which he lured them with promises of reforms in the national government and thereby induced them to, at his order, attack and besiege Älvsborg.

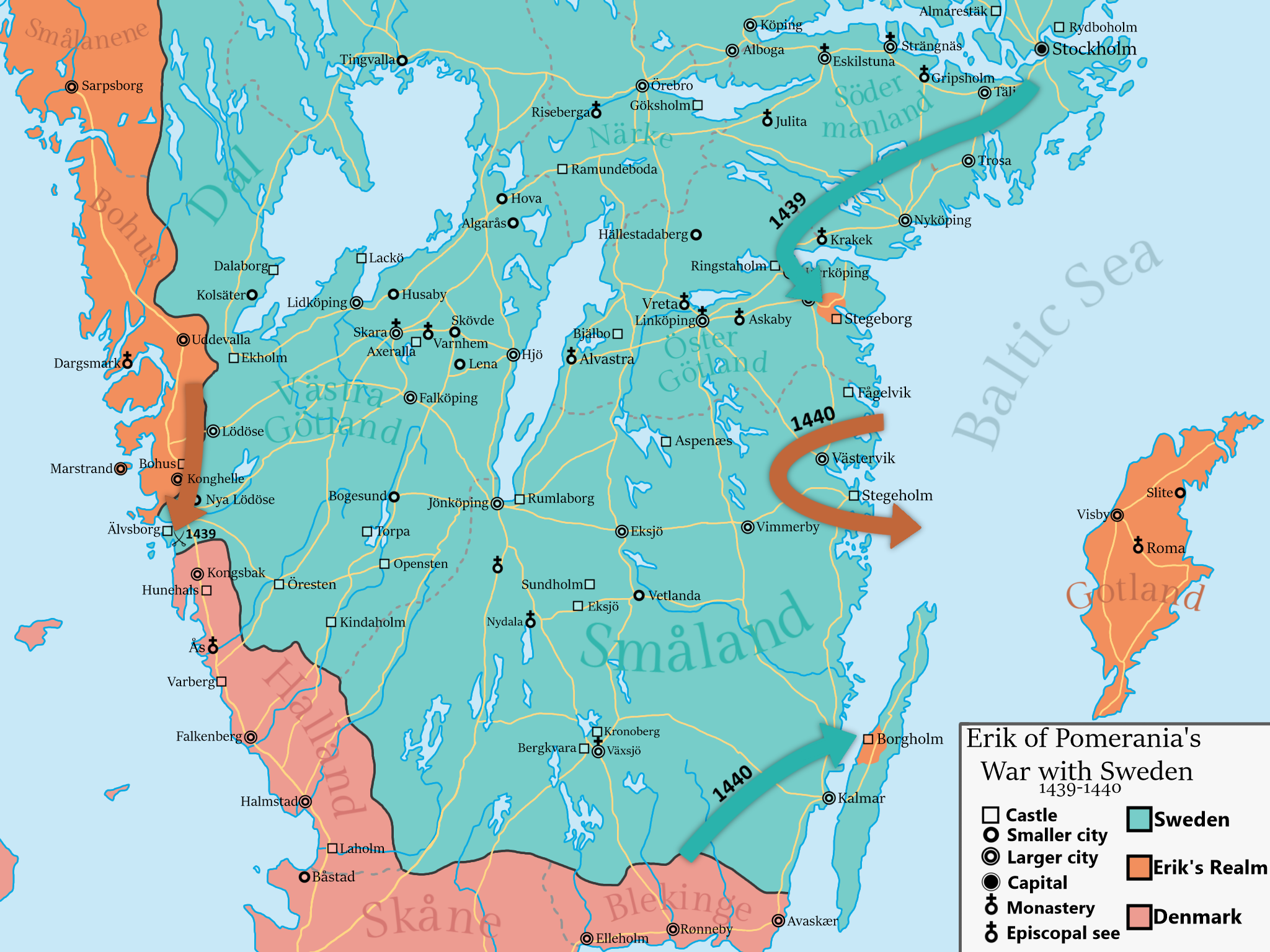
Eric of Pomerania's War against Sweden (1439-40)

== Siege ==
In the summer, on Erics orders, Norwegians under the command of Johan Umreise and Olaf Buk went towards Älvsborg, they had a combined strength of around 700 men, of which 600 were courtiers, being Eric's sheriffs and bailiffs, as well as groups of burghers and peasants. These forces were joined by 100 horsemen sent by the Bishop of Hamar. They quickly surrounded the fortress and began besieging it. Since it was not possible to conquer the fortress by storm, they began erecting siege weapons all around Älvsborg. One siege tower was erected on Skinnareklippan, a "barfrid" which they used to "disturb the crew at Älvsborg". The most likely way that they "disturbed" the garrison in Älvsborg was by firing arrows and boulders. A constant threat to the besieging Norwegians was that the population living around Älvsborg was expected to be loyal to the garrison of Älvsborg and Ture Turesson, because of this, the population was forced to pledge allegiance to Eric of Pomerania.

=== Surrender negotiations ===
After the siege had lasted 10 weeks, the Norwegians had not yet succeeded in destroying and getting through the walls of Älvsborg, but the will of the commander, Ture Turesson, was quickly breaking. Because of this, he was willing to begin negotiating a surrender. Ture Turesson promised that, if he had not received help within a month, he would surrender it to the Norwegians. To secure this agreement, eight of the best men in the fortress were given as hostages to the Norwegians.

=== Relief ===
Turesson was allowed to leave Älvsborg unharmed to call for help. He quickly rode to his half brother, Karl Knutsson, who was situated at Stäkeborg and began organizing a new force there. Turesson then continued to Axvalla, where he got additional forces. After having organized these new forces, he immediately sent them towards Älvsborg. The two opposing armies met in an open field, probably in the Kungsladugård area. It is said that the Norwegian force advanced with rifles, crossbows, spears, and muskets.

After fighting, the Norwegian army suffered a crushing defeat, with many being wounded and captured. and both of its commanders fled back to the fortification at Skinnareklippan, however, only one of them, being Johan Ummereise, is known to have been able to escape with the help of a boat across the Göta River. The other commander, Olaf Buk, was never heard from again, and it is assumed that he died in the battle. When the Swedes secured the battlefield, they attacked the remaining Norwegian troops at Skinnareklippan who were trapped there. They begged for their lives, but when they descended from the hill, a battle ensued, and around 200 Norwegians lost their lives, with the rest fleeing. The Norwegians were also forced to leave behind all of their armour and equipment as they fled.

== Aftermath ==
On 21 August, Karl Knutsson signs a truce with Eric of Pomerania in Arkösund, but this would fail to end the conflict between them.

== Works cited ==
- Sundberg, Ulf (2010). Myrenberg, Ludvig (ed.). Sveriges krig 1050–1448 [Sweden's wars 1050–1448] (in Swedish). Svenskt Militärhistoriskt Bibliotek. pp. 361–362. ISBN 9789185789610.
- Sundberg, Ulf (1998). Medeltidens svenska krig [Swedish wars in the Middle Ages] (in Swedish). Stockholm: Hjalmarson & Högberg. pp. 267–268. ISBN 9789189080263.
- Montelius, Oscar (1948). Sveriges historia till våra dagar [Sweden's history to our days] (in Swedish) (1st ed.). P.A. Norsted & Söners. p. 455.
- Hogner, Gustaf; Westerling, G; Thomée, Gustaf (1859). Historiskt-geografiskt och statistiskt lexikon öfver Sverige.
- Fredberg, Carl (1977). Det gamla Göteborg: lokalhistoriska skildringar, personalia och kulturdrag [Old Gothenburg. Local history descriptions, personnel and cultural features] (in Swedish). Lund : Ekstrand. p. 19. ISBN 9789174080155.
