= Old Älvsborg =

Castle in Gothenburg, Sweden

- Gamla Älvsborg
- Gothenburg in Sweden
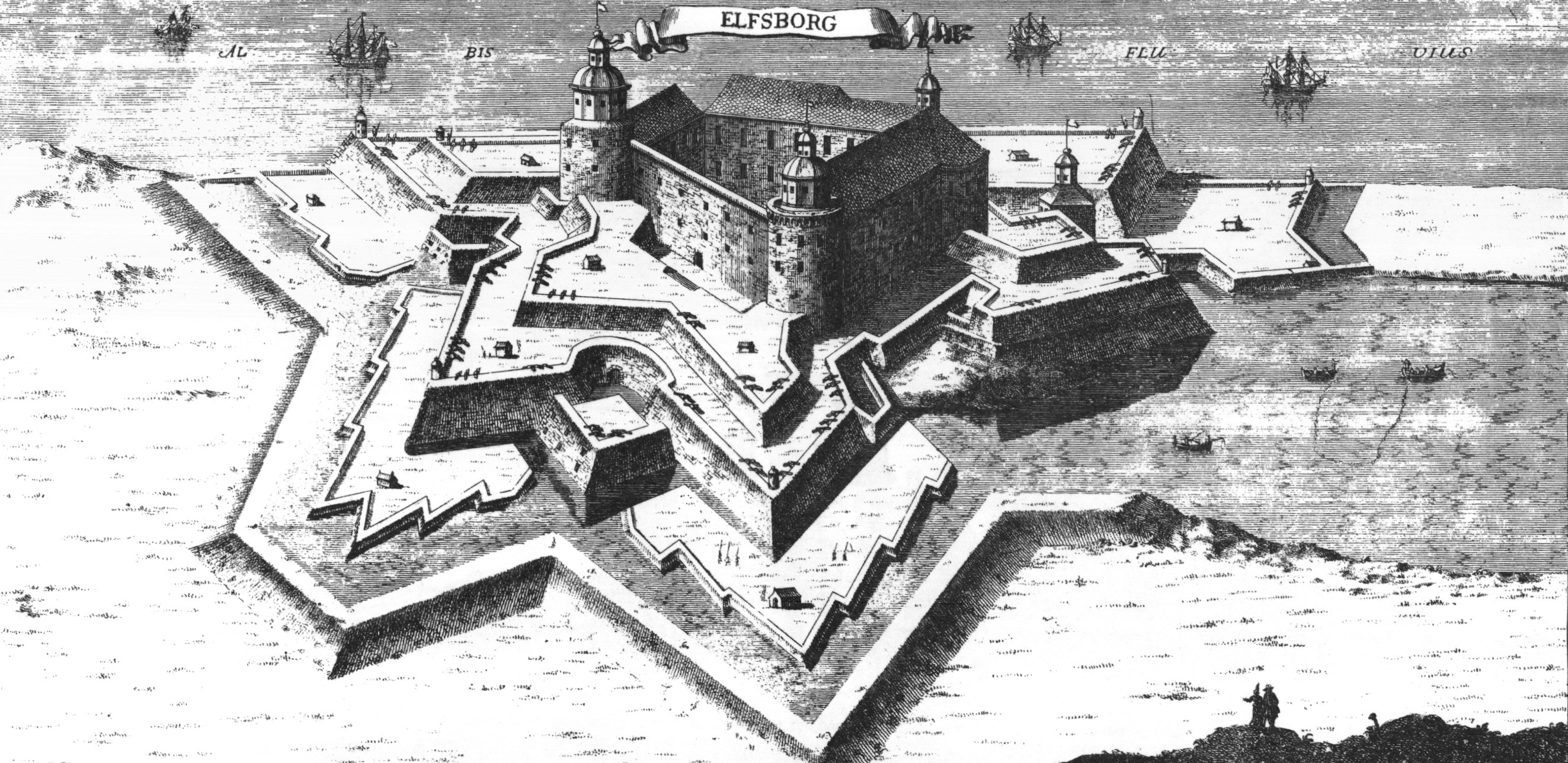
- "Elfsborg" as it appears in Erik Dahlbergh's Suecia antiqua et hodierna, seventeenth century.

Location
- Coordinates: 57°41′23″N 11°54′26″E

Site history
- Built: c.1360
- Built by: Magnus Eriksson
- In use: c.1360-1660
- Fate: Demolished 1660-73
- Battles/wars: Engelbrekt Rebellion, Union Wars, Northern Seven Years War, Kalmar War, Second Karl Gustav War

Älvsborg (lit. 'river stronghold'), now generally known as Old Älvsborg (Swedish: Gamla Älvsborg) or Älvsborg Castle (Swedish: Älvsborgs Slott) to distinguish it from the later New Älvsborg and Älvsborg Fortress, was a medieval castle situated on the rocky outcrop known as Klippan, on the south bank of the Göta Älv river within the urban area of the modern city of Gothenburg. It was demolished in the late seventeenth century, but some of its ruins are still visible today, close to the southern pylon of the Älvsborg Bridge.

== History ==
During the Middle Ages, the Göta Älv was Sweden's sole point of access to the North Sea, as the coastline to the north (Bohuslän) was part of Norway until 1658, while the area to the south (Halland) was part of Denmark until 1645. The river mouth, and by extension the heights at Klippan overlooking it, therefore had immense strategic significance.

Älvsborg Castle is first mentioned in written sources during the reign of King Albert (1364-89), but seems to have been built slightly earlier, most likely during the reign of his predecessor Magnus Eriksson. Magnus certainly seems to have been responsible for the construction of another castle in the area, at Lindholmen on the opposite bank of the river. Indeed, Älvsborg may have been intended to replace Lindholmen, as the latter fortress fell out of use shortly after the construction of Älvsborg.

In 1434, during the Engelbrekt Rebellion against King Erik of Pomerania, Älvsborg was attacked by the eponymous rebel leader Engelbrekt Engelbrektsson, but it seems the siege was unsuccessful. In 1436 another rebel army marched on the castle, this time led by the Marshal of the Realm, Karl Knutsson (Bonde), who persuaded the German castellan Mattias van Kaalen to surrender Älvsborg without a fight. Norwegian forces loyal to Erik, commanded by Johan Umreise, attacked Älvsborg in 1439, but they were forced to abandon the siege after ten weeks.

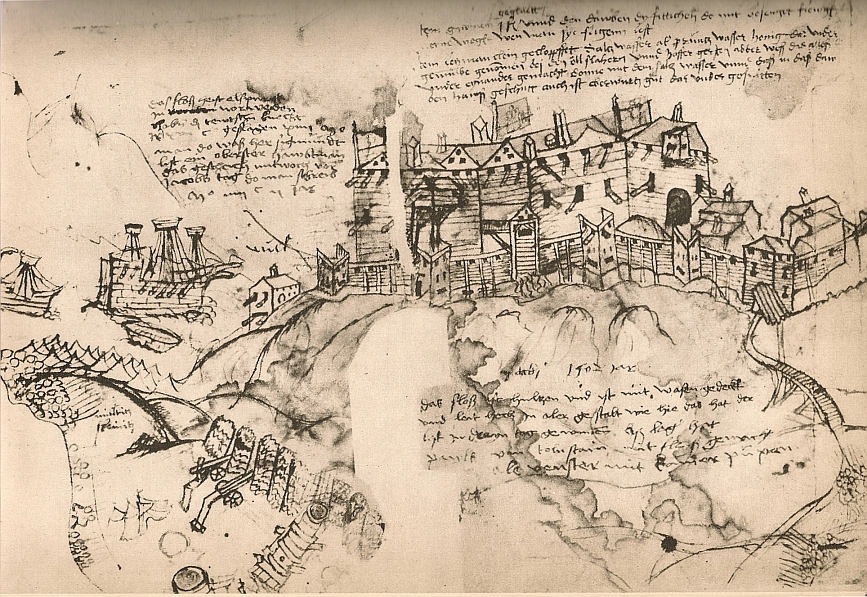
Prince Christian's assault on Älvsborg, 1502. Drawing by Paul Dolnstein, a landsknecht mercenary in Danish service.

The deposition of Erik and election of Christopher of Bavaria as king restored unity to the Kalmar Union, but after Christopher's death in 1448 war broke out again, this time between Sweden, where Karl Knutsson Bonde was elected king, and Denmark-Norway. Älvsborg was subsequently besieged twice by Norwegian forces, in 1452 and 1455, but was successfully defended by Tord Bonde, King Karl's cousin.

Älvsborg was however attacked and captured in 1502 by Crown Prince Christian (the future King Christian II of Denmark-Norway), who burnt the castle to the ground. It was subsequently rebuilt by the Swedes, only to be captured again in 1519, and this time the Danes held onto it for four years, until the end of the Swedish War of Liberation.

Älvsborg was strengthened and modernised by King Gustav I, transforming it from a mediaeval castle into a Renaissance fortress with up-to-date trace italienne outworks. In November 1545 the king decided to establish a new town adjacent to Älvsborg, to replace Nya Lödöse, and the new settlement was formally inaugurated in summer 1547, under the name Älvsborgs stad (Älvsborg Town).

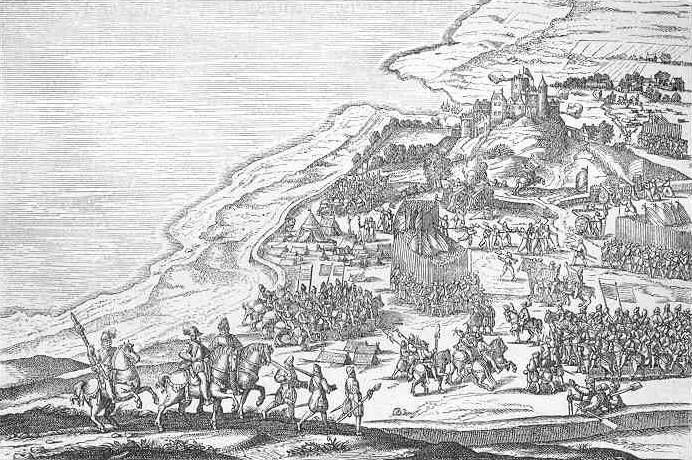
The capture of Älvsborg by Frederick II of Denmark, 1563

In 1563, when the Northern Seven Years' War broke out, Älvsborg was attacked by the Danes, who razed Älvsborg Town to the ground and quickly captured Älvsborg Castle itself, despite its modernised defences. Älvsborg remained in Danish hands throughout the rest of the war. The war ended with the Treaty of Stettin (1570), under which Älvsborg was returned to Sweden in exchange for a payment of 150,000 riksdaler, the so-called First Älvsborg Ransom (Swedish: Älvsborgs Första Lösen). To pay this sum, Sweden heavily taxed all moveables in the country. Peasants had to pay one tenth of their property's value, while burghers had to pay either a twelfth (if their town had escaped damage in the war) or an eighteenth (if their town had been burnt).

In 1612, during the Kalmar War, the Danes attacked and captured Älvsborg once again. When the war ended the following year with the Treaty of Knäred, the Swedes were again required to pay a considerable sum of money in order to redeem the fortress, the so-called Second Älvsborg Ransom (Swedish: Älvsborgs Andra Lösen). It was even larger than the First Ransom, amounting to some one million riksdaler, and was not paid until 1619, six years after the war had ended; during this period Älvsborg was held by the Danes as security for the ransom.

When the Swedish county system was established in 1634, Älvsborg became the capital and namesake of Älvsborg County, which comprised the traditional province of Dalsland and the western half of the province of Västergötland.

The repeated capture of Älvsborg by the Danes demonstrated that the fortress was no longer defensible, in large part because the improved range and power of modern gunpowder artillery meant that it had become chronically vulnerable to bombardment from the adjacent Sjöbergen hills. In the 1640s it was therefore decided to build a completely new stronghold on the island of Kyrkogårdsholmen, which became known as New Älvsborg (Swedish: Nya Älvsborg). Accordingly, in 1650 Johan Wärnschiöldh, the Quartermaster-General of the Swedish Army, proposed that Old Älvsborg be demolished in order to render it useless to any invading forces. Despite these questions about its future, Old Älvsborg was reported to be "in good shape" in 1654, and remained in service during the Second Karl Gustav War. After the conclusion of that conflict, however, the authorities took the decision to go ahead with Wärnschiöldh's proposal and raze the fortress; the county administration of Älvsborg County was subsequently relocated to Gothenburg. After several delays, the demolition work was completed in 1673.

In 1901 a neo-Gothic sugar factory, the Toppsockerfabrik (Top Sugar Factory) was constructed on Klippan, partly incorporating the foundations of the castle. The factory ceased production in 1957, and in the 1970s it became the shared workshop of the arts group Konstnärernas Kollektivverkstad Göteborg, which is still based there today. Those parts of the castle ruins which were not destroyed by the construction of the factory can still be seen today on the summit of Klippan, although a canopy has had to be erected to protect them from further damage.

== Legacy ==
Älvsborg gave its name to three subsequent fortifications, two of them also in the Gothenburg area (New Älvsborg and Älvsborg Fortress), while the third (Fort Nya Elfsborg) was in New Sweden, the Swedish colony in North America.

Älvsborg County was not renamed despite the transferal of its seat of administration to Gothenburg (and later to Vänersborg), and thus preserved the castle's name until 1997, when it was merged with the neighbouring counties of Gothenburg and Bohus and Skaraborg to form Västra Götaland County. Numerous organisations and private clubs in the area still use the name Älvsborg, most notably the sports club IF Elfsborg. A succession of warships in the Swedish Navy have also been named after Old Älvsborg, most recently the HSwMS Älvsborg.

== Gallery ==
Älvsborg Today
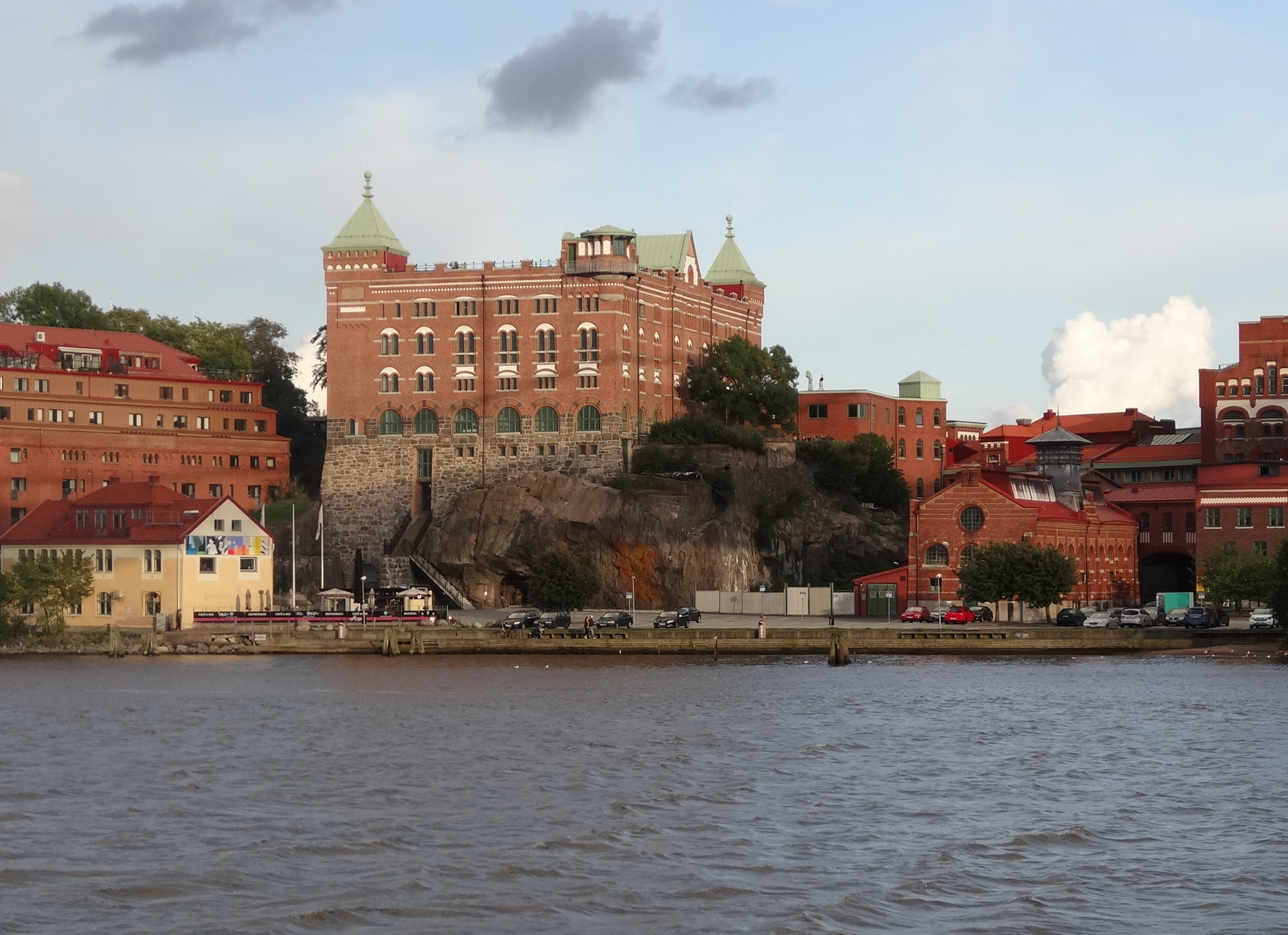
The Toppsockerfabrik, built on the outcrop Klippan overlooking the Göta Älv.

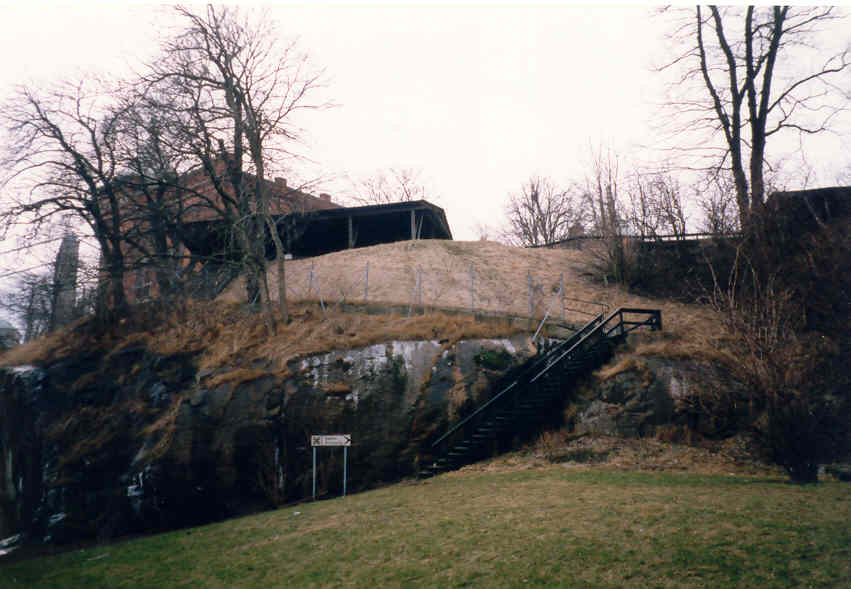
Klippan from the landward side, with both the Toppsockerfabrik and preserved ruins of Älvsborg visible.

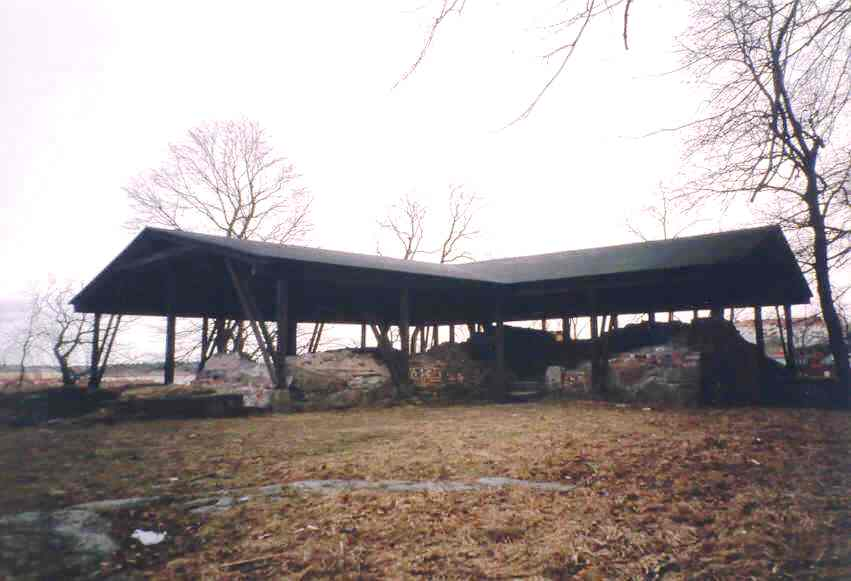
Preserved ruins of Älvsborg, protected by a modern canopy.

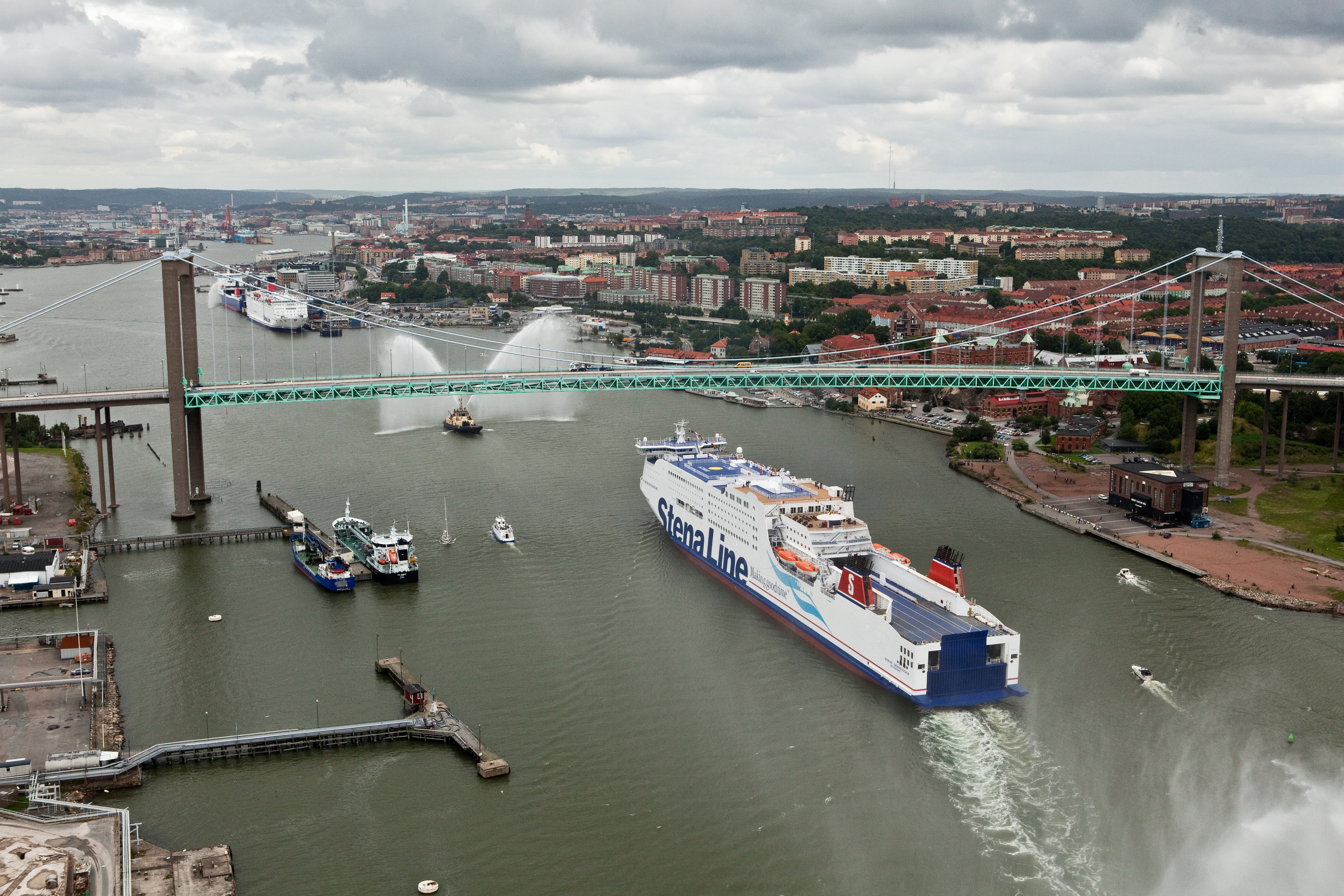
The Älvsborg Bridge, with Gothenburg in the distance. The Toppsockerfabrik is on the right, partially obscured by the deck of the bridge.

== See also ==
- Gothenburg
- Lindholmen Castle, earlier mediaeval castle on the opposite bank of the Göta Älv
- New Älvsborg, island fortress which replaced Old Älvsborg as the principal fortification protecting Gothenburg.
- Fort Nya Elfsborg, fort in the Swedish colony of New Sweden, named after (Old) Älvsborg.
- Treaty of Stettin (1570), which included the First Älvsborg Ransom.
- Second Älvsborg Ransom (1613)
