= Lindholmen Castle (Gothenburg) =

Castle in Gothenburg, Sweden

- Borgen Lindholmen
- Gothenburg in Sweden
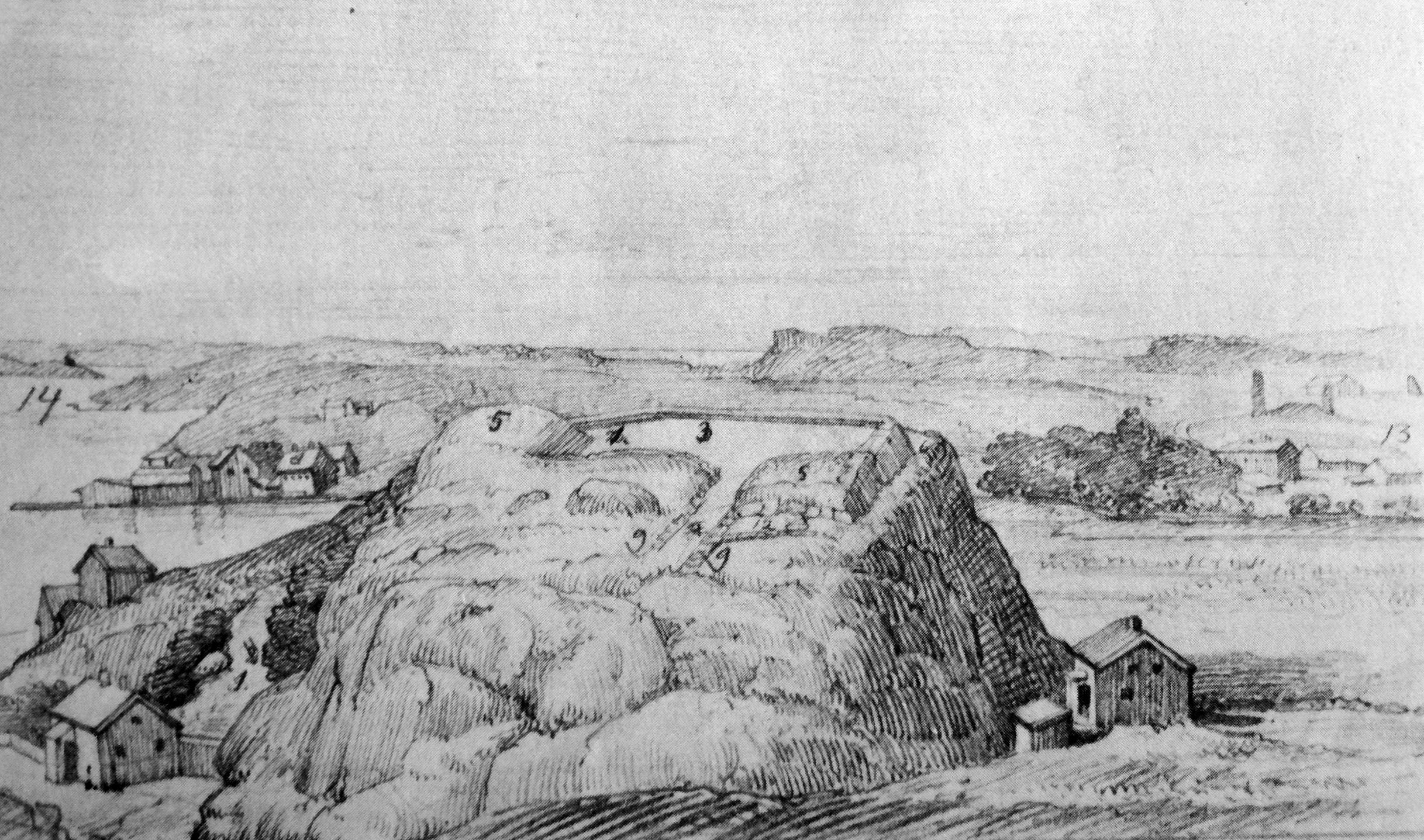
- Ruins of Borgen Lindholmen on Slottsberget, c.1860.

Location
- Coordinates: 57°42′15″N 11°55′47″E

Site history
- Built: c.1330
- Built by: Magnus Eriksson
- In use: c.1330-c.1360
- Fate: Abandoned c.1400

Lindholmen Castle (Swedish: Borgen Lindholmen) was a medieval castle on the former island of Lindholmen, which is now part of the larger island of Hisingen and lies within the urban area of modern Gothenburg. The castle stood on a rocky outcrop, which is still known as Slottsberget ("The Castle Hill"), overlooking the Göta Älv. This was an area of immense strategic significance in the Middle Ages, as at that time Hisingen straddled the Norwegian-Swedish border, and the mouth of the Göta Älv was Sweden's sole point of access to the North Sea.

The fortress is attested for the first time in 1333, when King Magnus IV Eriksson of Sweden marked one of his letters as having been written in castro nostro Lindholm ('in our castle Lindholm'), and it appears again in a letter from 1334, this time spelt Lyndholmis. It is sometimes claimed that the castle had previously been mentioned in Sturla Þórðarson's Hákonar saga Hákonarsonar, as the saga refers at one point to a location við Lindhólmana ('by the Linden-Isles'), but Sturla never actually states that there was a castle or indeed other any sort of settlement in the area. Nor is any castle at Lindholmen mentioned in a 1315 document by which Dukes Erik Magnusson and Valdemar Magnusson, brothers of King Birger, clarified the ownership of various castles and other holdings in the Göta Älv area. It is therefore probable that the castle was built during the early years of Magnus's reign (1319-64).

Magnus was in fact king over Norway as well as Sweden, and it is possible that he constructed Lindholmen Castle in order to provide himself with a residence close to the border on the Swedish side, as a counterpart to Bohus Castle, only a few kilometres to the north on the Norwegian side of the frontier. This would have enabled him to alternate regularly between his two realms, and thus avoid seeming to favour either one over the other, without having to actually travel very far. Indeed this seems to have been his usual practice in the 1330s, as most of his letters from this period were dated at either Lindholmen or Bohus.

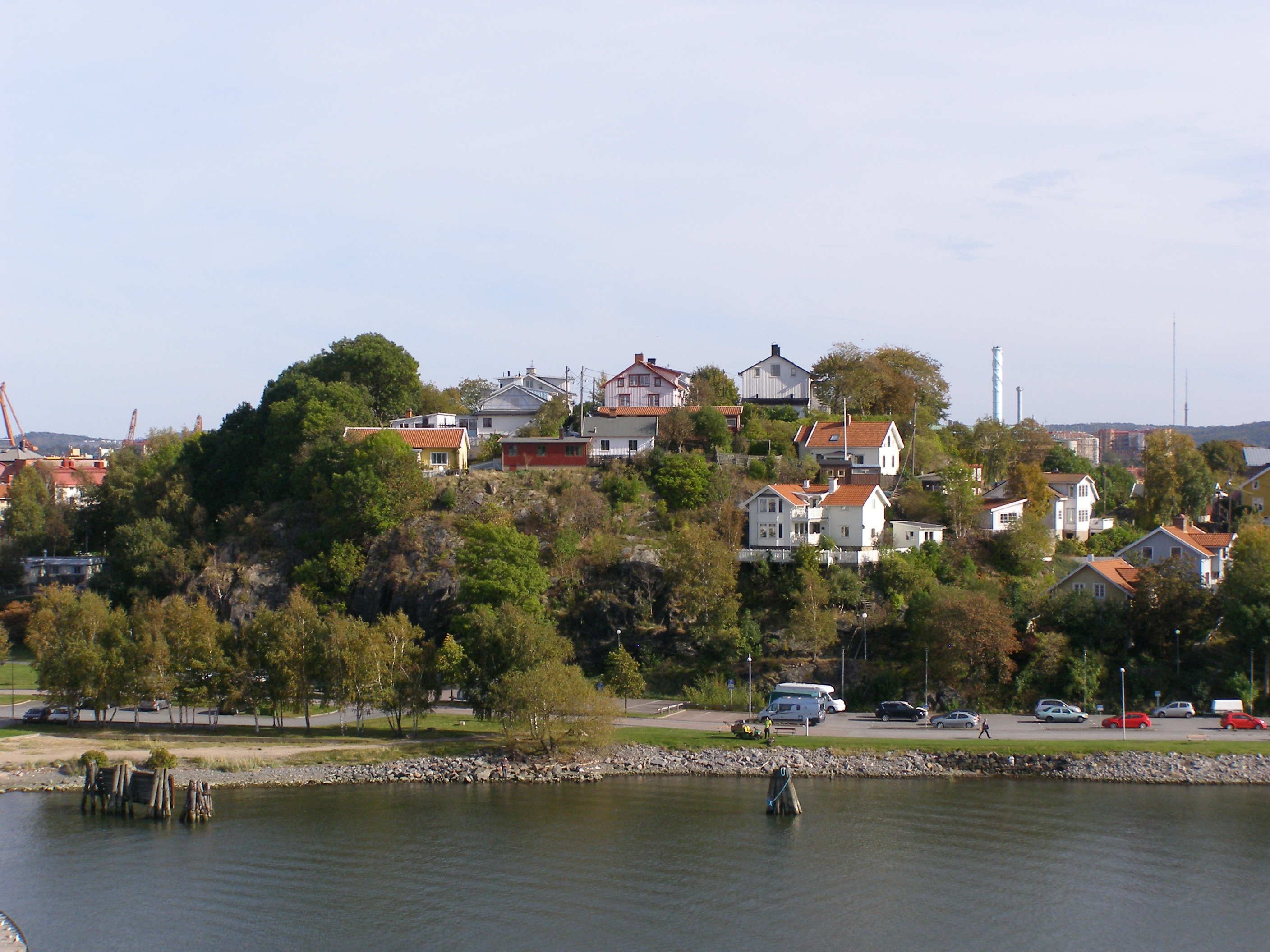
Slottsberget as it appears today.

In 1335 Magnus married Blanche of Namur, with the wedding taking place at Bohus. For her morning gift, Magnus gave his new queen, Lindholmens slott, Lödöse med tillhörande fögderi, samt Vermland och Dal ("Lindholmen Castle, Lödöse with its accompanying bailiwicks, and also Värmland and Dalsland"). The castle is mentioned several further times over the next few years, but after 1339 it disappears from the written records, perhaps having been superseded by the new fortress of Älvsborg Castle on the opposite side of the river. By 1410 the building had fallen into repair and was no longer considered habitable.

In 1778, King Gustav III ordered earthworks to be built on Lindholmen, and these fortifications were reinforced in 1789, during the Theatre War against Denmark-Norway, but the makeshift redoubt was subsequently allowed to fall into disrepair.

As of 1875 there were only some small fragments of the castle walls left standing, and in that year these meager remains were destroyed when the Lindholmen shipyard built workers' housing on Slottsberget. The hill remains dotted with houses today, and due to their excellent views across the Göta Älv they are considered to be rather desirable properties.

== See also ==
- Älvsborg Castle
- Magnus Eriksson
- Lödöse
