= Dominium maris septentrionalis =

The dominium maris septentrionalis ("Northern Seas dominion") were the western and northern maritime waters claimed by Denmark–Norway in the Early Modern era. Constituting the western and northern part of the Danish kongens strømme (Royal waters), the dominium maris septentrionalis stretched from the coasts of Greenland in the west to the Jutland peninsula in the southeast and to Norway's North Cape in the northeast, thus including the respective parts of the North Sea and the Atlantic and Arctic oceans. The claim to the dominium maris septentrionalis as opposed to claiming sovereignty only in coastal waters dates back to the 1560s, during the reign of Frederick II of Denmark-Norway.

== See also ==
- Dominium maris baltici
- Mare clausum
