= Horst Lademacher =

German historian (born 1931)

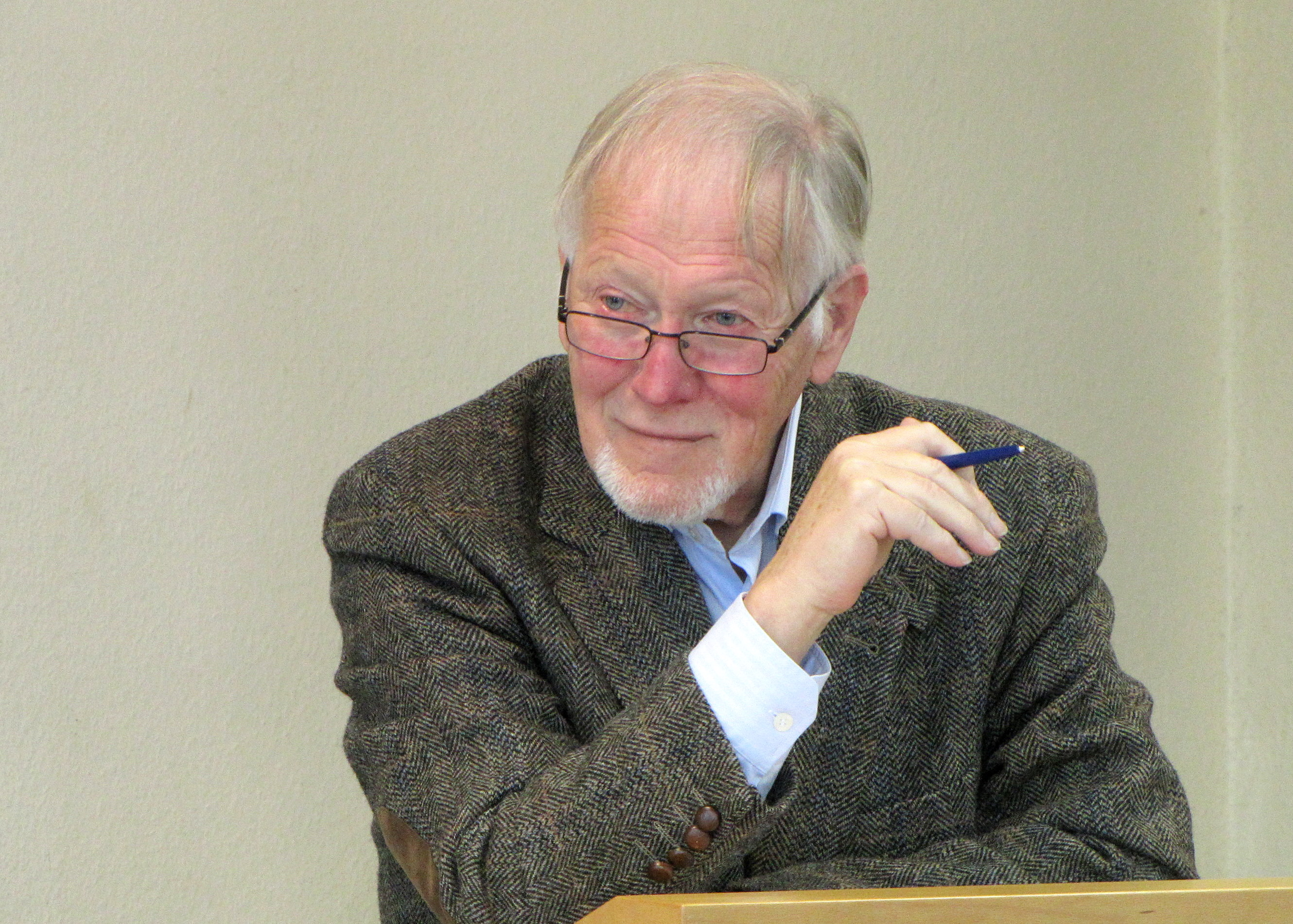
- Lademacher in 2020
- Born: 13 July 1931 (age 95); Ründeroth, Germany
- Occupation: Historian

Academic background
- Education: University of Münster (doctorate), University of Bonn (habilitation)
- Thesis: Die Stellung des Prinzen von Oranien als Statthalter in den Niederlanden von 1572-1584 (1957)

Horst Lademacher (born 13 July 1931) is a German historian specializing in the history of the Netherlands. He was a professor of modern history at the Vrije Universiteit Amsterdam, University of Kassel and the University of Münster. At the latter institute he was also director of the Zentrum für Niederlande-Studien from 1990 to 2000.

== Career ==
Lademacher was born on 13 July 1931 in Ründeroth. In 1957 he obtained his doctorate at the University of Münster with a dissertation titled: "Die Stellung des Prinzen von Oranien als Statthalter in den Niederlanden von 1572-1584", about the position of William of Orange as stadtholder in the Netherlands from 1572 to 1584. From 1958 to 1962 he worked as a scientific employee at the International Institute of Social History. He subsequently worked two years for the European Economic Community in Brussels. In 1969 Lademacher obtained his habilitation at the University of Bonn under Franz Petri with a dissertation titled: "Die belgische Neutralität als Problem der europäischen Politik 1830-1914" on the Belgian neutrality as a problem of the European politics from 1830 to 1914.

In 1971 Lademacher became university lecturer at the University of Bonn. He was a professor of modern history at the Vrije Universiteit Amsterdam between 1972 and 1979. In the latter year he became professor at the University of Kassel. In 1990 he became professor of modern history at the University of Münster and director of its then newly-founded Zentrum für Niederlande-Studien. Lademacher retired in 2000 and was succeeded as director by Friso Wielenga. In 2001 a Festschrift was released in his honour.

Since the 1950s Lademacher studied the history of the Netherlands. He speaks Dutch. Apart from his work regarding the Netherlands he has also published on the labour movement, German history of the 19th and 20th century and the history of countries on the Rhine river.

Lademacher was elected a foreign member of the Royal Netherlands Academy of Arts and Sciences in 1992. In 1996 he was named Officer in the Order of Orange-Nassau.
