= Siege of Danzig (1655–1660) =

Siege in 1655–1660

Coordinates: 54°22′00″N 18°38′00″E

- Part of the Northern War of 1655–1660 and Deluge
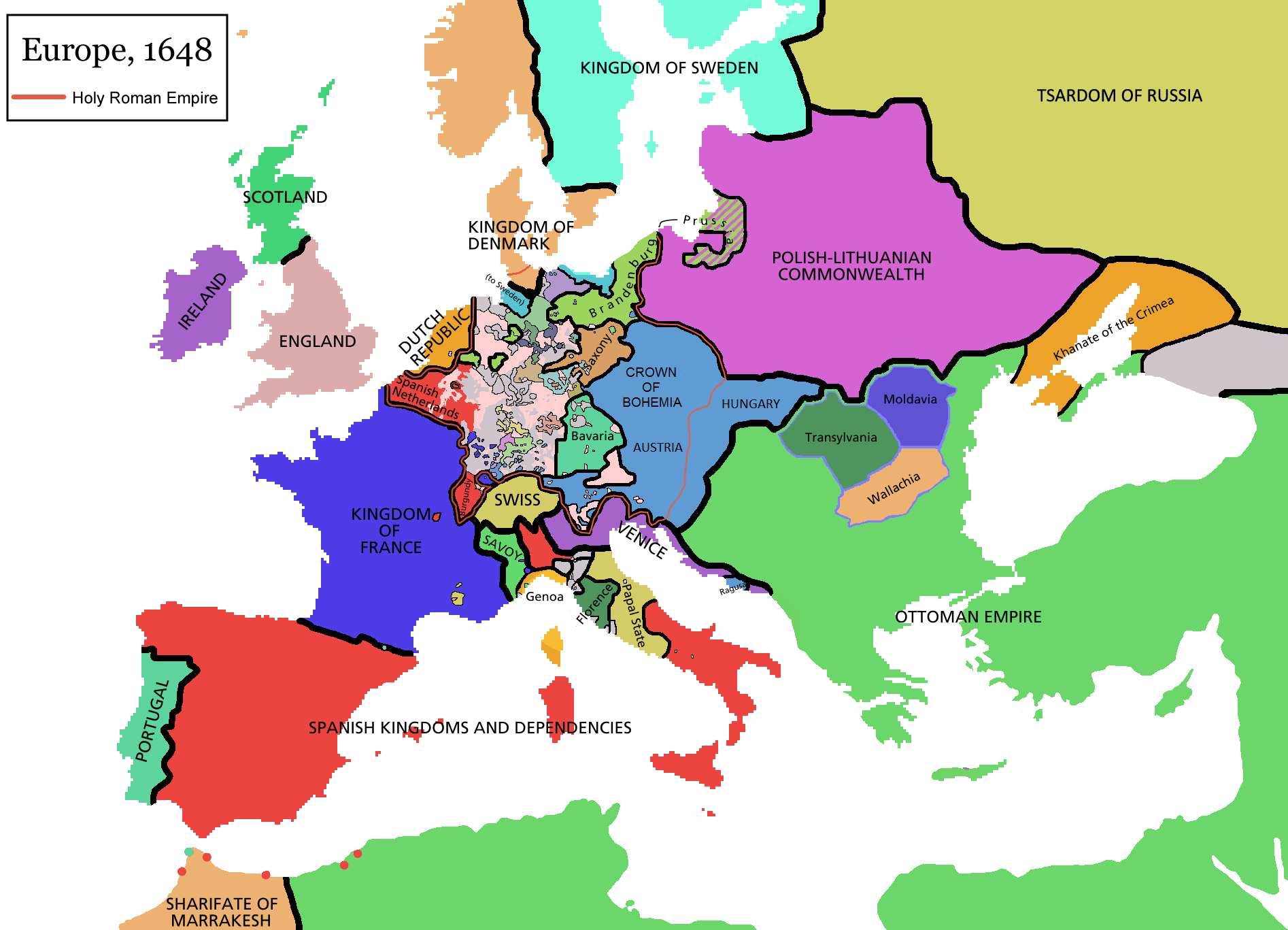
- Map of Europe at around that time.
Date	1655–1660
Location	Danzig
Result	Polish-Lithuanian-Dutch victory

Belligerents
Swedish Empire	Polish–Lithuanian Commonwealth; Dutch Republic

Commanders and leaders
(Swedish Empire) Charles X Gustav (Swedish Empire) Lorens von der Linde	(Polish–Lithuanian Commonwealth) Adrian von der Linde

The siege of Danzig took place between 1655 and 1660 when a Swedish force tried to capture this important Baltic Sea port city from the Polish–Lithuanian Commonwealth during the Second Northern War. After 5 years of fighting around Danzig (Gdańsk), the Swedish force, having made little progress, surrendered.

== Chronology ==
- 1655
  - Swedish naval forces blocked Danzig's harbor – trade was suspended.
  - Swedish land forces capture the fortress Danziger Haupt (Głowa Gdańska, Gdańsk Head) – very important water gate on Vistula River
- 1656, July – Dutch naval forces comes to Gdańsk Bay and unblock Danzig's harbor.
- 1656, September – Treaty of Elbing: siege lifted due to Dutch intervention
- 1659, 26 October – Poles defeated the Swedes in a skirmish near Gdańsk Head.
- 1659, 22 December – Swedish garrison of the fortress Gdańsk Head capitulated.
- 1660, May – Treaty of Oliva was signed. End of war.

Danzig all of that time was unconquered and remain loyal to Polish–Lithuanian Commonwealth.
