= Älvsborg Ransom (1613) =

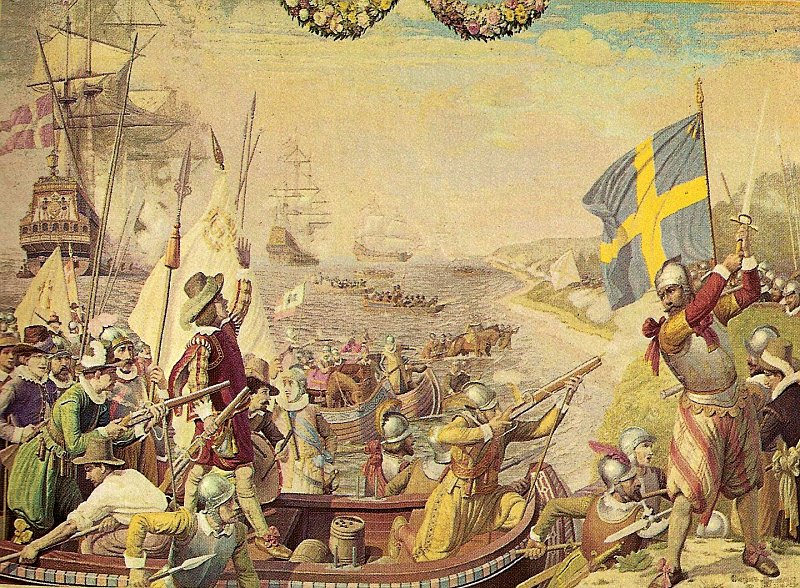
Danish landing at Älvsborg

The Second Älvsborg Ransom (Swedish: Älvsborgs Andra Lösen) was an indemnity, stipulated in the 1613 Treaty of Knäred, which ended the Kalmar War. During the war the Danes had occupied the vital border fortress of Älvsborg Castle (near modern Gothenburg, Sweden), and the Swedes were required to pay the ransom in order to redeem the castle.

According to the treaty, the ransom was one million silver rixdollars. The ransom would be financed by a nationwide tax, which would be paid during each of the six years 1613–1618 by the entire population of Sweden. The Danes not only held Älvsborg Castle as a collateral for the ransom, but also the towns of New Lödöse, Old Lödöse and Gothenburg, as well as seven hundreds of Västergötland. Yet, since the return of Älvsborg was uppermost in the mind of the government, the ransom and the tax to pay for it has in history been named after this castle.

== Payment ==
The ransom of one million rixdollars was the equivalent in value of four years of Swedish harvests. It had to be paid in four installments, and in rixdollars, an international currency not in everyday use in Sweden. Most of the rixdollars were obtained by selling Swedish copper on the international market, but the government also had to take Dutch loans of altogether 250,000 rixdollars. In the end Sweden managed to pay the ransom. The payment was financed by a severe extra tax paid during six years by almost all persons above the age of 15, including the royalty and the nobility. The only exempts were the tenants of noble seat farms, and active duty soldiers. The Danes had hoped that Sweden would not be able to pay, thereby losing its outlet to the Atlantic.

== The Älvsborg tax ==
The extra tax financing the Älvsborg ransom was collected through a specially created organization outside the normal revenue system, but in cooperation with it. A special government agency under four Lords of the Realm was created, and provincial tax commissioners appointed. The commissioners organized compulsory parish meetings, where all the peasants had to attend, together with the bailiff and the vicar. New lists of taxpayers were created based on the bailiff's old tax records and the vicar's church records. This extensive apparatus managed to include most taxable individuals, although unmarried men of military age did the utmost to not be entered, to escape future drafts. Those who did not or could not pay, had their property confiscated, whether nobility or peasant.

The tax had to be paid in good rixdollars, domestic or foreign, or in good silver; 2 lot, 1 quintin (~30 grams) of silver per rixdollar. Anyone who had not rixdollars, had to pay with viable Swedish coins, although not in less than half-daler coins; 6 marks or 1½ Swedish daler per rixdollar. The tax could also be paid in kind; one lispound (~8.5 kilograms) copper per 1½ rixdollars, one shippound (~136 kilograms) bar iron per 4 rixdollars, one tun (~147 litres) of wheat per 1½ rixdollars, one tun of rye or malt per rixdollar.

== Tax rates ==
Tax subject	Annual tax
The Queen Dowager	According to her will and propensity
The King	32 rixdollars per 100 dalers (48%) of Crown revenues.
The Hereditary Princes	32 rixdollars per 100 dalers (48%) of revenues.
Nobility of the Realm	32 rixdollars per armed horseman levied to the King
Treasurers, masters of the mint, clerks of the mint, customers	50 rixdollars each
Bishops, controllers, secretaries	40 rixdollars each
Captains, lieutenants and ensigns of horse	20 rixdollars each
Superintendents, town and parish priests	16 rixdollars each*
Bailiffs and clerks	16 rixdollars each
Foreign merchants	16 rixdollars each, and then 2 rixdollars per 100 dalers turnover
Each ship arriving from abroad	1 rixdollar per last, and 2 rixdollars per mast, at each arrival
Captains, lieutenants and ensigns of foot	12 rixdollars each
Underlagmän and lagläsare (local judges)	12 rixdollars each
Professors and school masters	8 rixdollars each
Peasant-lensmen	8 rixdollars each
Burghers, including those who have lived in towns now ravaged	2 rixdollars per assessed öre in tax
Kopparbergsmän (copper miners)	2 rixdollars each, and then 3 rixdollars per mine part
Järnbergsmän (iron miners)	2 rixdollars each, and then 2 rixdollars per mine or furnace part
Town curates	4 rixdollars each
Tailors, cobblers, skinners and other artisans without their own workshops	4 rixdollars each
Sergeants and other non-commissioned officers, under-bailiffs and under-clerks	3 rixdollars each
Parish curates	2 rixdollars each
Private soldiers of horse and foot, yeomen and others of the soldiery possessing farms, propertied burghers and peasants, whether freeholders or tenants, whether in possession of a whole or a half holding	2 rixdollars each
Vagrants, labourers, farmhands from 15 years of age, whether serving, staying with the parents, or being his own man	1 rixdollar each
Serving women or maids over 15 years of age, in town or country	½ rixdollar
Source:	* The bishop should adjust the tax according to wealth.
