= Treaty of Elbing =

1656 treaty between Sweden and the Netherlands during the Second Northern War

The Treaty of Elbing was signed between the Dutch Republic and the Swedish Empire on 1 September (OS) / 11 September 1656, during the Second Northern War, in Swedish-held Elbing (Elbląg). It served to protect Dutch interests in the Baltic Sea, ended the Dutch intervention in the Swedish siege of Danzig, and renewed a fragile peace between the Dutch Republic and Sweden. Within the former, there was opposition to the treaty demanding elucidations, which were agreed upon only on 29 November (OS) / 9 December 1659 in the Convention of Helsingör. Earlier in 1659, in the Concert of The Hague, England, France, and the Dutch Republic had agreed to include the treaty of Elbing in their common agenda regarding the Second Northern War.

== Background ==
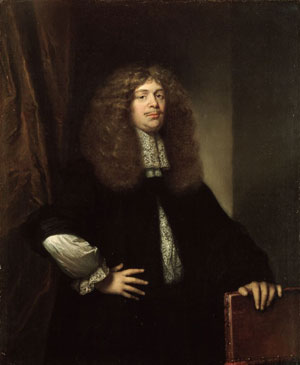
Coenraad van Beuningen

During the Second Northern War, Charles X Gustav of Sweden aimed at establishing a Swedish dominion in Royal Prussia, part of the Polish–Lithuanian Commonwealth, and subdued most of the province in a campaign of December 1655. The Dutch Republic heavily relied on grain imports from the Baltic Sea region, much of it was bought from Royal Prussia's chief city Danzig (Gdansk). (Note: Trade with the Baltic Sea area was the backbone ("mother trade") of Dutch economy. Imports included grain, tar, wood, pitch and ash, exports included herring, salt, wine, dairy products and textiles. The imported goods were stapled in Amsterdam and in part re-exported, yet the Baltic grain was essential not only for commerce but also for feeding the Dutch population. The primary Dutch grain sources were Poland, Prussia and Livonia, Dutch-Baltic trade peaked around 1650. The port cities of the time were heavily influenced by Dutch culture and home to Dutch settlers. Frijhoff & Spies (2004), p. 134.) When Swedish forces began raising a siege of Danzig in early January 1656, the key figures of contemporary Dutch politics, Johan de Witt and Coenraad van Beuningen, saw the Dutch trade in the Baltic endangered and feared an alliance of a strengthened Sweden with their rival Maritime Power, England.

Van Beuningen, at that time residing in Copenhagen at the court of Sweden's adversary and Dutch ally Frederick III of Denmark, proposed declaring war on Sweden. De Witt favoured a more moderate approach, fearing follow-up declarations of war on the Dutch Republic by England and France. De Witt instead proposed aiding Danzig directly by dispatching a relief force, and in July gained consent for sending in a fleet and a landing force by the States-General of the Netherlands due to diplomatic efforts of Holland's diplomats in The Hague.

In late July, forty-two Dutch and nine Danish vessels arrived in Danzig, (Note: Just a few years before, in the course of the First Anglo–Dutch War (1652–54), the Dutch Republic had raised a navy consisting of dedicated warships. Before, the Dutch fleet only consisted of armed merchant vessels. Frijhoff & Spies (2004), p. 133.) carrying 10,000 soldiers and 2,000 guns. The army made landfall and a Dutch commander took over Danzig's defense. Christer Bonde, Sweden's ambassador in London, alerted Lord Protector Oliver Cromwell who sent letters to Sweden and the Dutch Republic urging for a peaceful settlement.

== Terms ==
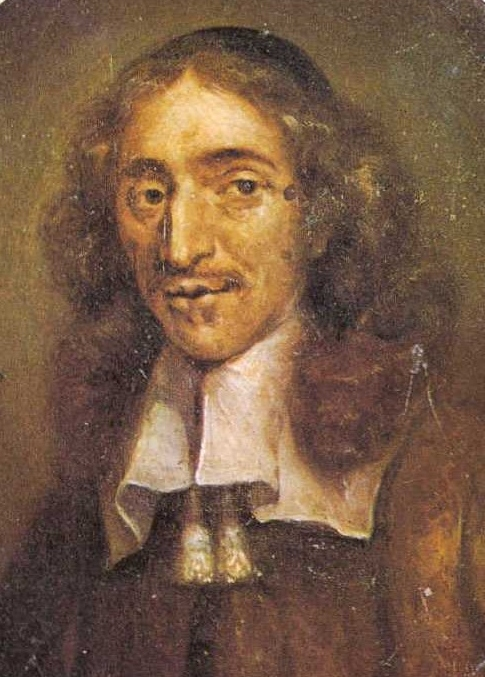
Johan de Witt

The treaty was concluded on 11 September 1656, which was 1 September on the Julian calendar then used in the Baltic area.

Two earlier Dutch-Swedish trade agreements of 1640 and 1645 were confirmed. Sweden assured Dutch merchants free passage to Danzig as well as free trade and navigation in the Baltic Sea. The port dues in trade cities like Danzig and Pillau (now Baltiysk) were not to be raised.

Sweden further promised to respect Danzig's neutrality in the Second Northern War, and granted the Dutch Republic the status of a "most favoured nation." Sweden and the Dutch Republic assured mutual friendship.

== Implementation ==
The treaty met with opposition by several Dutch towns and Denmark. The Dutch opposition against the treaty was led by Van Beuningen, who refused to ratify it and looked forward to confront Sweden on the Danish side, while De Witt stood by the treaty and his strategy to aid Denmark and be conciliatory with Sweden at the same time. De Witt proposed 'elucidation' of the treaty rather than abandoning it, and the States-General accepted.

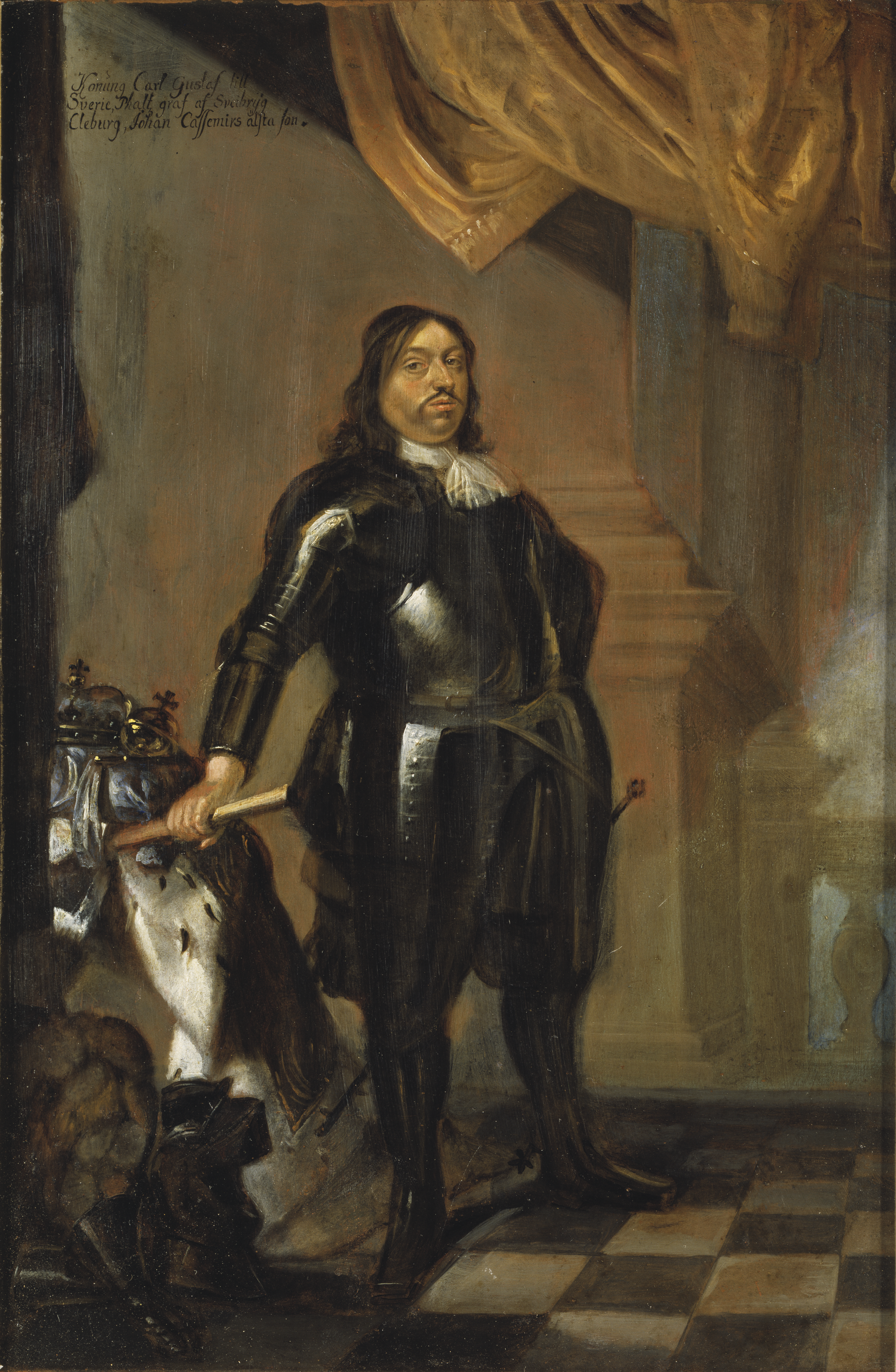
Charles X Gustav of Sweden

In 1657, Frederick III of Denmark declared war on Sweden, but his invasion was repelled by Charles X Gustav who subsequently took all of Denmark except for the capital city Copenhagen. With the consent of De Witt, who thought that a balance of the Danish and Swedish powers would serve Dutch interests best, and despite the protest of part of the Dutch elites, Dutch auxiliaries were deployed to relieve the Swedish siege of Copenhagen.

De Witt realized that the intervention on the Danish side bore the risk of provoking England, who was then allied to France. Accordingly, the relief forces were advised to avoid any encounters with the English navy, and De Witt furthered negotiations with English and French diplomats to agree on a common stance regarding the Second Northern War. An agreement was reached in The Hague, drafted by English envoy Downing, which encompassed the treaty of Elbing along with its elucidations. The agreement was endangered when after the abdication of Richard Cromwell, Downing was instructed to remove the passages regarding Elbing, yet in May 1659 the new English government approved the original draft. The agreement, ratified on 21 May, became known as Concert of The Hague.

On 29 November (OS) / 9 December 1659, all Dutch parties and Sweden had settled for the elucidations of the treaty of Elbing, which was then accepted by all parties in the Convention of Helsingör, concluded in Helsingør (Helsingör, Elsinore).

== Bibliography ==
- Fallon, Robert Thomas (1989). Milton in Government. Penn State Press. ISBN 0-271-02630-8.
- Frijhoff, Willem; Spies, Marijke (2004). Dutch Culture in a European Perspective. 1650, hard-won unity. Dutch Culture in a European Perspective. Vol. 1. Uitgeverij Van Gorcum. ISBN 90-232-3963-6.
- Kirby, D. G. (1990). Northern Europe in the early modern period. The Baltic world, 1492–1772 (2 ed.). Longman. ISBN 0-582-00410-1.
- Postma, Mirte (2007). Johan de Witt en Coenraad van Beuningen. Correspondentie tijdens de Noordse Oorlog (1655-1660) (in Dutch). scriptio. ISBN 978-90-8773-007-9.
- Pieken, Gorch (1994). Herrschaftssystem und internationales Konfliktverhalten am Beispiel der Republik der Vereinigten Niederlande zwischen 1650 und 1672 (in German). Cologne University Press.
- Press, Volker (1991). Kriege und Krisen. Deutschland 1600-1715. Neue deutsche Geschichte (in German). Vol. 5. Beck. ISBN 3-406-30817-1.
- Rowen, Herbert H. (2003). John de Witt. Statesman of the "True Freedom". Cambridge University Press. ISBN 0-521-52708-2.
- Troebst, Stefan (1997). Handelskontrolle, "Derivation", Eindämmerung. Schwedische Moskaupolitik 1617-1661. Veröffentlichungen des Osteuropa-Instituts München. Reihe Forschungen zum Ostseeraum (in German). Vol. 2. Harrassowitz. ISBN 3-447-03880-2.
- Van der Bijl, Murk (1995). "Johann Moritz von Nassau-Siegen (1604-1679). Eine vermittelnde Persönlichkeit". In Lademacher, Horst (ed.). Oranien-Nassau, die Niederlande und das Reich. Beiträge zur Geschichte einer Dynastie. Niederlande-Studien (in German). Vol. 13. LIT. pp. 125–154. ISBN 3-8258-2276-1.
