= Friso Wielenga =

Dutch historian

Johan Willem Friso Wielenga (born 1956) is a Dutch contemporary historian.

== Life and career ==
Born in Rotterdam, Wielenga studied history and politics at the Vrije Universiteit Amsterdam from 1975 to 1978 and in 1982/1983 with a German Academic Exchange Service scholarship at the Rheinische Friedrich-Wilhelms-Universität Bonn. He received his Doctorate in 1989. He then taught International relations at the University of Groningen and from 1990 Political history at the Utrecht University. In 1992, he became associate professor of German Contemporary history and Dutch-German relations at the University of Groningen and in 1997 associate professor of German contemporary history at the University of Utrecht.

Wielenga has been director of the Haus der Niederlande at the Westfälische Wilhelms-Universität between 1999 and 2021. He works as a journalist for the Dutch daily newspapers de Volkskrant and NRC Handelsblad.

In 2015, he was awarded the Bundesverdienstkreuz am Bande for his services to German-Dutch relations.

== Publications ==
- West-Duitsland. Partner uit noodzaak. Nederland an de Bondsrepubliek 1949–1955. Het Spectrum, Utrecht 1989, ISBN 90-274-2187-0.
- Schaduwen van de Duitse geschiedenis. De omgamg met het nazi- en DDR-verleden in de Bondsrepubliek Duitsland. Boom, Amsterdam 1993, ISBN 90-5352-109-7.
  German edition: Schatten deutscher Geschichte. Der Umgang mit dem Nationalsozialismus und der DDR-Vergangenheit in der Bundesrepublik. Translated from Dutch by Christoph Strupp. SH, Vierow bei Greifswald 1995, ISBN 3-89498-015-X.
- Vom Feind zum Partner. Die Niederlande und Deutschland seit 1945. With a foreword by Wolfgang Clement. (Original title Van vijand tot bondgenoot.) Translated from Dutch by Christoph Strupp and Anne Wielenga-Flohr. Agenda, Münster 2000, ISBN 3-89688-072-1.
- with Ilona Riek: Niederlande- und Belgienforschung in der Bundesrepublik Deutschland. Waxmann, Münster/New York/Munich/Berlin 2003, ISBN 3-8309-1250-1.
- Die Niederlande. Politik und politische Kultur im 20. Jahrhundert. Waxmann, Münster/New York/München/Berlin 2008, ISBN 978-3-8309-1844-8.
  Niederländische Ausgabe: Nederland in de twintigste eeuw. Boom, Amsterdam 2009, ISBN 978-90-850-6714-6.
- Geschichte der Niederlande. Translated from Dutch by Annegret Klinzmann. Reclam, Stuttgart 2012, ISBN 978-3-15-010893-2.
