= Dominium maris baltici =

Political aim

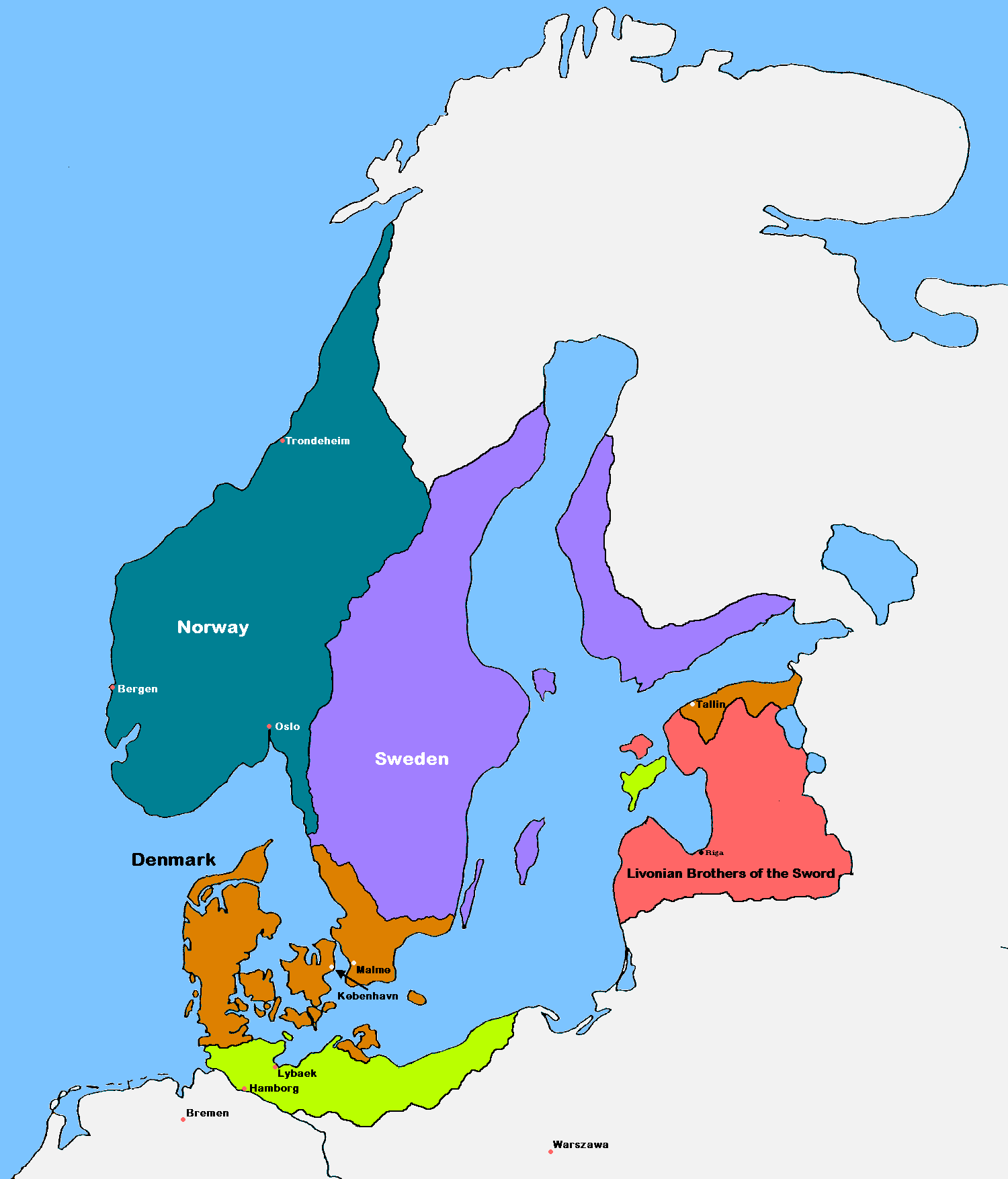
Baltic Sea in 1219

Norway
Sweden
Denmark
Conquered by Denmark in 1219 (Pomerania conquered in 1219, lost in 1227. Ösel purchased in 1559, lost in 1645)
Sword Brethren

The Swedish Empire at its peak in the 17th century

Sweden under Gustav Vasa, by 1560
Acquired by Sweden (by 1611), under Vasa's sons
Acquired by Sweden (by 1654), under Gustavus Adolphus the Great
Acquired by Sweden (by 1660), under Charles X

The establishment of a dominium maris baltici (Note: Ecclesiastical Latin: [doˈmini.um ˈmaris ˈbaltitʃi], Classical Latin: [dɔˈmɪnɪ.ũː ˈmarɪs ˈbaɫtɪkiː].) ("Baltic Sea dominion") was one of the primary political aims of the Danish and Swedish kingdoms in the late medieval and early modern eras. Throughout the Northern Wars the Danish and Swedish navies played a secondary role, as the dominium was contested through control of key coasts by land warfare.

== Etymology ==
The term, which is commonly used in historiography, was probably coined in 1563 by the King of Poland, Sigismund II Augustus, referring to the hegemonial ambitions of his Swedish adversaries in the Livonian War. The first written reference stems from the Dutch-Swedish treaty of 5 (O.S.) / 15 (N.S.) April 1614, concluded in The Hague. (Note: Treaty of The Hague, 5 (15) April 1614, article VIII of the Dutch version: "[...] sijne Koninghlijcke Majesteyt ende de Croon Sweeden, in haere Hoogheydt, Regalien, Rechten, Dominio Maris Baltici [...]" ("the sovereignty, regalia, rights, dominium maris baltici [...] of His Royal Majesty and the Swedish Crown", i.e. Gustavus Adolphus of Sweden). printed in DuMont: Recueil des traitez d'alliance tome V, 1728, p. 248.)

== Wars over the Baltic ==
Several European powers regarded the Baltic Sea as of vital importance. It served as a source of important materials and as a growing market for many commodities. So large did the importance of the region loom that it became of interest even to powers that did not have direct access to it, such as Austria and France. For several centuries, Sweden and Denmark would attempt to gain total control of the sea, a policy which other local and international powers opposed. Historians have described the control of the Baltic as one of the main goals of Denmark's and Sweden's policies.

The Scandinavian (Nordic) powers, who sensed opportunity in the power vacuum created by the weak or non-existent naval power of the Holy Roman Empire and Poland–Lithuania, adopted expansionist policies which fostered conflict over the Baltic. Denmark and Sweden used their control of parts of the Baltic to fuel their militaries. Each claimed the Baltic as their own, and promised to protect foreign shipping. While the Nordic powers vied with one another over control, they both agreed that it should be the domain of one of them, not of an "outsider" like Poland or Russia. The Scandinavian powers tried to prevent the rise of their opposition through diplomatic treaties, which forbade other powers like Russia or Germany to build navies, and through military actions, whether targeting opponent naval forces, or through taking control of the Baltic ports. In one of the most notable actions to retain its monopoly over the Baltic, Denmark in 1637 destroyed, without declaration of war, the nascent Polish–Lithuanian Commonwealth Navy.

The numerous wars fought for the dominium maris baltici are often collectively referred to as the Northern Wars. Initially Denmark had the upper hand, but eventually it lost ground to Sweden. Neither Denmark nor Sweden managed to realize thorough military and economic control of the Baltic, though Sweden during its time as an empire came closest to that aim before the Great Northern War of 1700–1721.

=== Danish dominium maris baltici ===
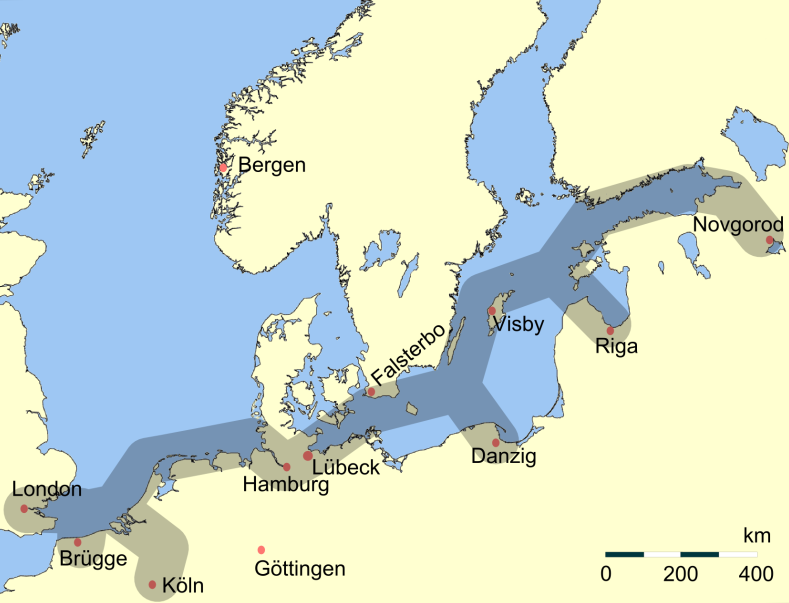
Main trading routes of the Hanseatic League

Historiography uses the term dominium maris baltici either in a narrower sense as a new Swedish concept of the Early Modern era, closely tied to the Swedish Empire, or in a wider sense including the preceding Danish hegemony in the southern Baltic Sea.

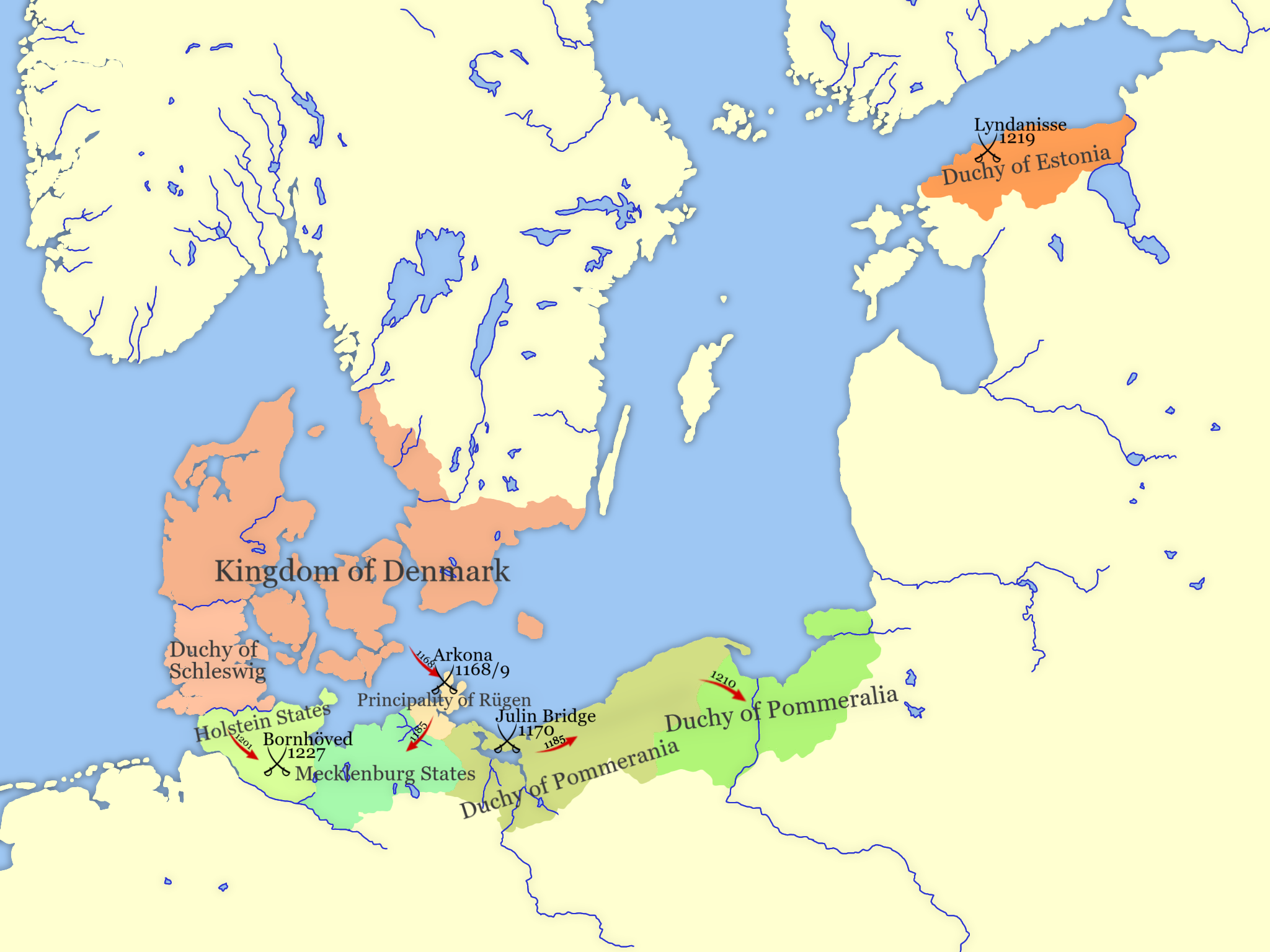
Danish Empire and campaigns 1168-1227

Denmark had subdued the southern Baltic coast from Holstein to Pomerania in the 12th century, but lost control in the 13th century after being defeated by German and Hanse forces in the Battle of Bornhöved (1227), retaining just the principality of Rügen. Thereafter, the Hanseatic League became the dominant economic power in the Baltic Sea. Robert Bohn credits Valdemar IV "Atterdag" of Denmark (reigned 1340–1375) as the first Danish king to pursue a policy of establishing a Danish dominium maris baltici, aiming at adding to Denmark's naval dominance and economical hegemony at the expense of the Hanseatic League. To achieve this aim, Valdemar sold Danish Estonia to the Teutonic Order state in 1346, consolidating his finances and raising an army from the revenue. After initial territorial gains, Valdemar conquered the Hanseatic town of Visby (Gotland) in 1361, resulting in a war decided in favour of the League in the peace of Stralsund in 1370, which marked the climax of Hanseatic power.

Atterdag's daughter and de facto successor, Lady Margaret, managed to concentrate the crowns of Denmark, Norway and Sweden in her Copenhagen-centered Kalmar Union from 1397. In 1429, Kalmar king Eric of Pomerania started to raise the Sound Dues from merchants entering or leaving the Baltic Sea, allowing the Copenhagen court to benefit from the Baltic Sea trade profits without engaging in economic adventures itself. The Sound Dues, imposed until 1857 and constituting a primary source of income for the Royal treasury, quickly became a contentious issue, which brought Denmark into conflict with the Hanseatic League and the neighboring powers.

After the break-up of the Kalmar Union in the early 16th-century, the Kingdom of Sweden became Denmark–Norway's primary rival for hegemony in the Baltic Sea. Christian IV of Denmark's victory in the Kalmar War in 1613 marked the last instance of a successful defense of a Danish dominium maris baltici against Sweden; subsequent wars ended in Sweden's favor. The period of Danish intervention in the Thirty Years' War of 1618–1648 (Kejserkrigen of 1625–1629) is also considered part of the wars for the dominium maris baltici—in this war, however, the opponent was not the Swedish king, but the ambitious Holy Roman Emperor Ferdinand II, who temporarily planned to establish the Empire as a naval power in the Baltic. He assigned this task to Albrecht von Wallenstein, leading to a concerted action by Denmark and Sweden in the defense of Stralsund. The Danish defeat in the Battle of Wolgast (1628) and the subsequent Treaty of Lübeck in 1629, however, removed Denmark from the battlefield.

=== Swedish dominium maris baltici ===
After Sweden had left the Kalmar Union in 1523, it became Denmark's major rival for the dominium maris baltici. The first war ascribed to this conflict is the Northern Seven Years' War (1563–1570, associated with the Livonian War), which between 1611 and 1613 followed the above-mentioned Kalmar War. Major Swedish successes followed the capture of Riga in 1621 and the Swedish landing in Pomerania in 1630. The gains in the Torstenson War, a theater of the Thirty Years' War, humiliated Denmark, and the subsequent Peace of Westphalia confirmed Sweden's status as a European great power (stormaktstiden).

Swedish control of the Baltic was not thorough, however, since the maritime powers, especially the Dutch Republic, continued to be economically and militarily present and pursued their balance of power policy also in respect to Denmark and Sweden. Sweden sought to secure her dominium maris baltici by turning many towns (e.g. Riga, Narva, Wismar) into fortresses, often under the aegis of Erik Dahlbergh.

Since the Thirty Years' War, Sweden collected customs (Licenten) from merchant vessels on the Baltic Sea, in Swedish as well as in non-Swedish ports. These customs were calculated as a certain percentage of the value of transported goods, and once payment took place in any port, the respective receipt was valid for the whole dominium maris baltici.

The Second Northern War, the Scanian War and the first stage of the Great Northern War left Sweden's dominium maris baltici intact, yet it was finally ended by the Treaty of Nystad in 1721.

Contested Baltic Sea coastal regions, islands and straits of Sweden's dominium maris baltici
Regions	Major ports	Notes
Scania	Helsingborg	Scania, along with the adjacent provinces, was ceded to Sweden by Denmark in the Treaty of Roskilde in 1658, during the Second Northern War.
Scania	Malmö (Malmø)	Scania, along with the adjacent provinces, was ceded to Sweden by Denmark in the Treaty of Roskilde in 1658, during the Second Northern War.
Scania	Ystad	Scania, along with the adjacent provinces, was ceded to Sweden by Denmark in the Treaty of Roskilde in 1658, during the Second Northern War.
Blekinge	Karlskrona	Karlskrona founded in 1680 as primary Swedish naval base after Blekinge was ceded to Sweden by Denmark in the Treaty of Roskilde in 1658, during the Second Northern War.
Mecklenburg	Wismar	Swedish occupation and customs since 1632, Swedish dominion after the Peace of Westphalia, Danish occupation in 1675 (Scanian War), restored to Sweden in the Peace of Lund (1679), thereafter Swedish fortress, occupied by Danish, Hanoveranian and Brandenburgian forces during the Great Northern War, restored to Sweden under the caveat that the fortifications were razed, reduced in significance and pawned by Sweden to Mecklenburg-Schwerin in 1803
Mecklenburg	Rostock	Warnemünde, controlling the entry to the Rostock port, was ceded to Sweden in 1632 (Thirty Years' War), fortified and served to raise customs until 1714
Pomerania	Stralsund	Swedish garrison since the battle of Stralsund (1628) (Thirty Years' War), remained in Swedish Pomerania until 1815
Pomerania	Greifswald	Nominally under Swedish military control after the Treaty of Stettin (1630), conquered in 1631 (Thirty Years' War), remained in Swedish Pomerania until 1815
Pomerania	Stettin (Szczecin)	Controlled trade on the Oder, under Swedish military control after the Treaty of Stettin (1630), during the Thirty Years' War), remained in Swedish Pomerania until the 1720 Treaty of Stockholm (Great Northern War)
Pomerania	Kolberg (Kołobrzeg)	Most important of the relatively minor Farther Pomeranian ports, which all came under Swedish military control following the Treaty of Stettin (1630). While ceded to the Brandenburg-Prussian Province of Pomerania (1653–1815) in the Treaty of Stettin (1653), Sweden retained a share of the customs.
Pomerania	Danzig (Gdańsk)	Controlled trade on the Vistula, principal port of the Polish–Lithuanian Commonwealth (Royal Prussia province). Major trading point for the Dutch merchant fleets. Swedish customs following the Truce of Altmark (1629). Navy destroyed.
Prussia	Elbing (Elbląg)	A port in the Polish–Lithuanian Commonwealth (Royal Prussia province). Swedish occupation and customs during and after the Polish–Swedish War (1626–29), concluded by the Truce of Altmark (1629). Again during the Second Northern War, when it was also the site of a Dutch–Swedish agreement on Dutch rights in the Baltic Sea (Treaty of Elbing, 1659). Swedish troops cleared the city in 1660, following the Treaty of Bromberg.
Prussia	Königsberg (Królewiec, Kaliningrad)	A port of the Duchy of Prussia, vassal of Poland. Swedish customs following the Truce of Altmark (1629), Swedish vassalage of the Duchy of Prussia by the Treaty of Königsberg (1656), succeeded by the Prusso-Swedish alliance of Marienburg and its break-up in the Treaty of Bromberg, all during the Second Northern War
Prussia	Pillau (Piława, Baltisk)	A port of the Duchy of Prussia, vassal of Poland. Swedish occupation and customs during and after the Polish–Swedish War (1626–29), concluded by the Truce of Altmark (1629), Swedish vassalage of the Duchy of Prussia by the Treaty of Königsberg (1656), succeeded by the Prusso-Swedish alliance of Marienburg and its break-up in the Treaty of Bromberg, all during the Second Northern War
Livonia	Riga (Ryga)	Controlled trade on the Düna (Daugava) river (Livonian hinterland, Belarus and Russia). Under the Polish–Lithuanian Commonwealth control until Swedish conquest in 1621, remained in Swedish Livonia until the capitulation of Estonia and Livonia in 1710, formalized in the Treaty of Nystad in 1721.
Livonia	Pernau (Parnawa, Pärnu)	Under the Polish–Lithuanian Commonwealth control until 1617; in Swedish Livonia until the capitulation of Estonia and Livonia in 1710, formalized in the Treaty of Nystad in 1721.
Estonia and Ingermanland	Reval (Tallinn)	Subordinated itself to Sweden in 1561 (Livonian War), remained in Swedish Estonia until the capitulation of Estonia and Livonia in 1710, formalized in the Treaty of Nystad in 1721.
Estonia and Ingermanland	Narva	Important hub for Russian trade. Russian control from 1558 to 1581, Swedish afterward, retaken by the Russians in 1704
Islands		Notes
Gotland (Gothland)		Ceded to Sweden by Denmark in the Second Treaty of Brömsebro (1645), after the Torstenson War
Ösel (Øsel, Saaremaa)		ceded to Sweden by Denmark in the Second Treaty of Brömsebro (1645), after the Torstenson War
Bornholm		Temporarily conquered by Sweden in 1645 (Torstenson War), ceded to Sweden by Denmark in the Treaty of Roskilde (1658), during the Second Northern War, restored to Denmark by the Treaty of Copenhagen (1660)
Rügen (Rygen, Rugen)		Under Swedish military control after the Treaty of Stettin (1630) (Thirty Years' War), remained in Swedish Pomerania until 1815
Straits		Notes
Öresund (Øresund, "The Sound")		Entrance to the Baltic Sea from the North Sea, both coasts under Danish control until 1658, Sweden exempted from the Danish Sound Dues after the Second Treaty of Brömsebro (1645) (Torstenson War), eastern coast Swedish since the Treaty of Roskilde (1658, see Scania entry)

== Aftermath ==
The failure of the Scandinavian powers to take control of the Baltic, and steadfast refusal of other powers – local and international – to recognize their claims, is seen as one of the factors that led to the development of the "freedom of the seas" principle in international law.

== See also ==
- Dominium maris septentrionalis (dominion of the northern seas)
- Command of the sea
- Sound Dues – Historical toll on the use of the Øresund

== Bibliography ==
- Bohn, Robert (2001). Dänische Geschichte (in German). C.H.Beck. ISBN 3-406-44762-7.
- Olesen, Jens E. (2003). "Christian IV og dansk Pommernpolitik". In Asmus, Ivo; Droste, Heiko; Olesen, Jens E. (eds.). Gemeinsame Bekannte: Schweden und Deutschland in der Frühen Neuzeit (in Danish). Berlin-Hamburg-Münster: LIT Verlag. ISBN 3-8258-7150-9.
- Wahrmann, Carl (2007). Aufschwung und Niedergang. Die Entwicklung des Wismarer Seehandels in der zweiten Hälfte des 17. Jahrhunderts (in German). Münster: LIT. ISBN 978-3-8258-0098-7.
