= List of compositions by Martin Lohse =

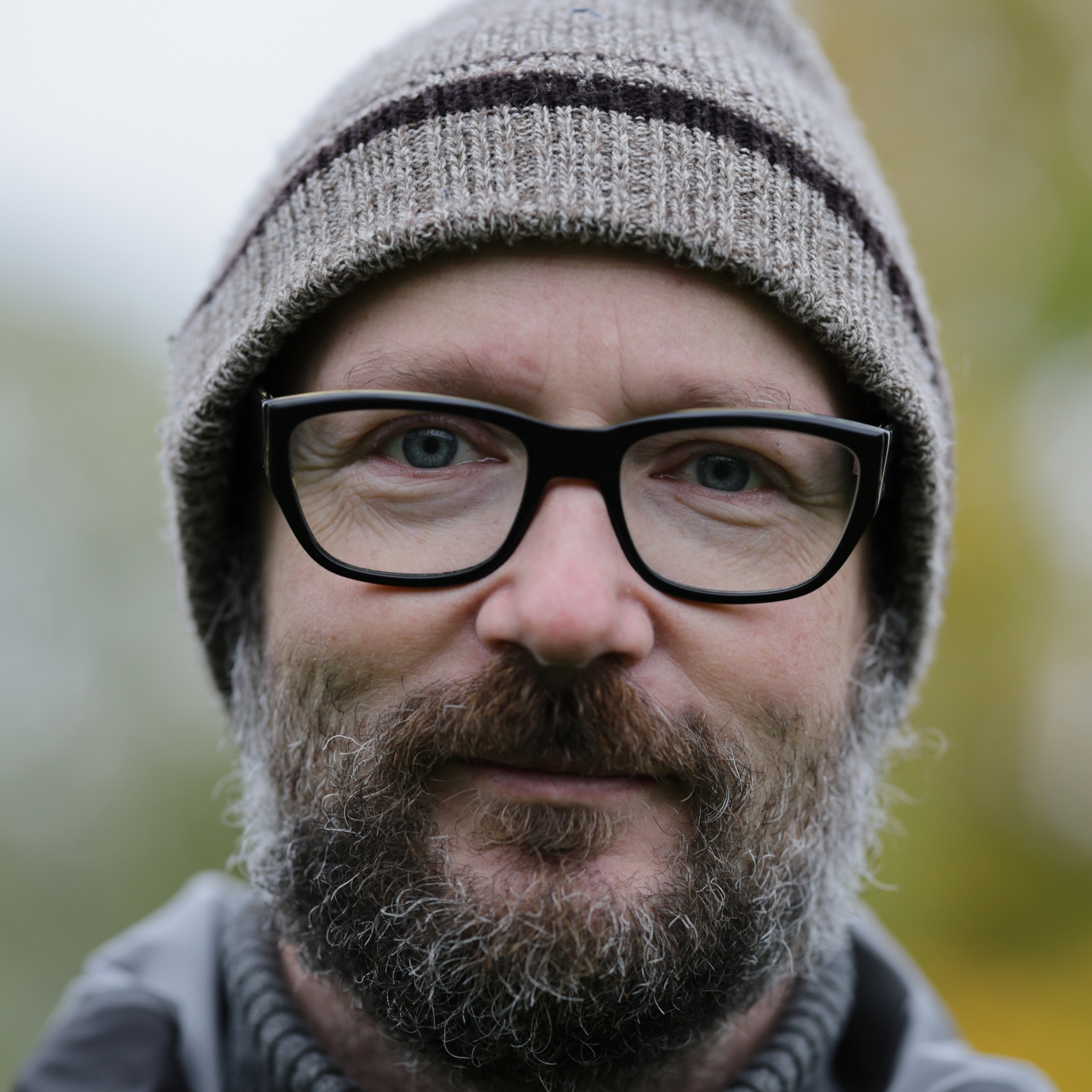
Martin Lohse 2020

This is a list of compositions by Martin Lohse initially categorized by genre, and sorted within each genre by worknumber "W."

== List of compositions ==
| Title | W. | Scoring | Date | Notes | Info, score and sound |
|---|---|---|---|---|---|
| === Orchestra === | | | | | |
| One minute for a C-major | | string orchestra | 1995 | | link |
| Lurid Light | 5 | symphony orchestra | 1998 | premiere 20 Feb 1999 by the Danish Chamber Orchestra | link |
| Magma | 11 | symphony amateur orchestra | 2001 | premiere 26 Jan 2002 by Albertslund Symfoniorkester | link |
| Awakening | 17 | symphony amateur orchestra | 2002 | premiere 23 Mar 2003 on Holmboe Festival, Denmark | link |
| Den Standhaftige Tinsoldat (The Steadfast Tin Soldier) | 21 | symphony amateur orchestra | 2004 | premiere 16 May 2004 in Tivoli Concert Hall | link |
| Moto immoto | 35 | symphony orchestra | 2009/2018 | | link |
| Symphony in one movement | 58 | symphony orchestra | 2020 | | link |
| === Concertante === | | | | | |
| In remembrance... | 18b | violin and orchestra | 2008 | | link |
| In liquid... first version | 29 | accordion and orchestra | 2008 | premiere 7 Feb 2009 by Bjarke Mogensen and Copenhagen Phil | link |
| In liquid... second version | 29b | accordion and orchestra | 2008/2010 | Cd-recording on Dacapo by Bjarke Mogensen and the Danish National Chamber Orchestra | link |
| Concerto in tempi | 34c | accordion and string orchestra | 2010/2012 | | link |
| Collage de temps | 41 | piano and sinfonietta | 2013 | premiere 25 Aug 2013 by David Lau Magnussen and Aarhus Sinfonietta Cd-recording on Dacapo by David Lau Magnussen and The Danish Chamber Players | link |
| Per Nørgård: Recall | A-3 | accordion and small sinfonietta | 1968/1977/2015 | arrangement premiered 12 Apr 2015 by Bjarke Mogensen and The Danish Chamber Players | link |
| Concerto in G | 51 | recorder and baroque strings | 2018 | dedicated to Bolette Roed and Arte dei Suonatori | link |
| In liquid... version for string orchestra | 29c | accordion and string orchestra | 2008/2010/2019 | premiere 5 Feb 2020 by Julie Holmegaard Schade and string orchestra | link |
| === Large ensemble === | | | | | |
| Værk for Storstrøms Kammerensemble (Work for the Danish Chamber Players) | 3 | chamber ensemble | 1998 | premiere 16 May 1998 by The Danish Chamber Players | link |
| Forandring (Changing) | 12 | chamber amateur ensemble | 2002 | for music school ensemble | link |
| Ember | 28 | amateur sinfonietta | 2008 | premiere 29 Nov 2008 at Frederikshavn Kunstmuseum, Denmark | link |
| Moto immoto | 35g | sinfonietta | 2009/2016 | Cd-recording on Dacapo by The Danish Chamber Players | link |
| === Chamber === | | | | | |
| Istid (Ice Age) | 2 | clarinet, violin, cello and piano | 1997 | premiere 7 Dec 1997 by Ensemble Nordlys in Danish Radio | link |
| Haiku | 6 | clarinet, violin, cello and piano | 1999 | premiere 12 Sep 1999 by Ensemble Nordlys in Danish Radio | link |
| Smoke | 8 | clarinet, violin, cello and piano | 2000 | premiere 1 Oct 2000 by Ensemble Nordlys in Danish Radio | link |
| Koncert | 10 | clarinet, violin, cello and piano | 2001 | premiere 24 Apr 2001 by Ensemble Nordlys in Black Diamond, Royal Library, Denmark | link |
| Koncert | 10b | recorder and accordion | 2001/2002 | premiere 24 Aug 2002 by Bolette Roed and James Crabb in Suså Festival, Denmark | link |
| In liquid... | 18 | violin and piano | 2003 | premiere 18 Oct 2004 by Christine Pryn and Joachim Olsson in the Royal Academy of Music, Aarhus | link |
| Koncert | 10c | flute, violin, cello and piano | 2001/2003 | | link |
| Image balancantes | 22 | clarinet, violin, cello and piano | 2004 | premiere 20 Sep 2004 by Ensemble Nordlys in Warsaw Autumn | link |
| The Dying Child | 23 | violin and piano | 2004 | premiere 9 Jan 2005 by Christine Pryn and Joachim Olsson in Dunkers Kulturhus, Helsingborg, Sweden | link |
| Edvard Grieg: "Jeg elsker dig" | A-1 | clarinet, violin, cello and piano | 1864/2004 | arrangement premiered 9 Jan 2005 by Ensemble Nordlys in Dunkers Kulturhus, Helsingborg, Sweden | link |
| The Dying Child | 23b | violin, piano, bass clarinet and cello | 2004/2005 | premiere 1 Nov 2005 by Ensemble Nordlys in Crawford Municipal Art Gallery, Emmet Place, Bishopstown Cork, Ireland | link |
| Franz Liszt: Liebestraum | A-2 | clarinet, violin, cello and piano | 1850/2006 | recomposition premiered Aug 2006 by Ensemble Nordlys | link |
| In liquid... first version | 26 | accordion and piano | 2008 | premiere 15 Feb 2009 by Bjarke Mogensen and David Magnussen in Sthens kirke, Helsingør, Denmark | link |
| 8 momenti mobile | 27 | saxophone quartet | 2008 | premiere 13 Dec 2008 by Jutlandia Saxophone Quartet in Kammermusiksalen, The Royal Academy of Music, Aarhus, Denmark | link |
| In liquid... second version | 26b | accordion and piano | 2008/2009 | premiere 15 Feb 2009 by Bjarke Mogensen and David Magnussen in Nafplion Festival, Nafplion, Greece | link |
| Hymn | 30 | brass quintet | 2009 | | link |
| Nocturne | 25b | oboe, cello and piano | 2007/2009 | premiere 4 Feb 2010 by Henrik Husum, Deborah Josephson, Lili Olesen in Festival - Februar Dage, Abbey of Our Lady, Aalborg, Denmark | link |
| Nocturne | 25c | clarinet, cello and piano | 2007/2010 | premiere 3 Sep 2010 by Trio Nord in Aalborg Kulturnat, Copenhagen | link |
| Concerti in tempi first version | 34a | accordion and piano | 2010 | | link |
| Koncert | 10d | cello and accordion | 2001/2010 | premiere 16 Jan 2011 by Toke Møldrup and Bjarke Mogensen in Lejre Musikskole, Lejre, Denmark | link |
| Moto immoto | 35b | accordion duo | 2009/2010 | premiered by Mythos | link |
| Moto immoto short version | 35d | accordion duo | 2009/2011 | premiere 6 Feb 2011 by Mythos in Hans Egedes Kirke, Copenhagen, Denmark | link |
| In liquid... third version | 26c | accordion and piano | 2008/2009/2011 | premiere 3 Apr 2011 by Bjarke Mogensen and Alex McKenzie in Apostelkirken, Copenhagen, Denmark | link |
| Moto immoto | 35e | accordion, violin, cello and contrabass | 2009/2011 | premiere 14 May 2011 by Holbæk Ensemblet in Elværket, Holbæk, Denmark | link |
| Slow river | 37 | cello, guitar and vibraphone | 2011 | premiere 20 Aug 2011 by Ordlyd Ensemble in OpenDays Festival, Abbey of Our Lady, Aalborg, Denmark | link |
| Concerti in tempi second edition | 34b | accordion and piano | 2010/2012 | | link |
| Concerti in tempi | 34c | accordion and string quintet | 2010/2012 | | link |
| Concerti in tempi | 34d | accordion and string quartet | 2010/2012 | | link |
| Concerti in tempi | 34e | accordion and cello quartet | 2010/2012 | | link |
| Forandring (Changing) | 12b | clarinet, 2 violins, viola and piano | 2002/2012 | for music school ensemble | link |
| Koncert | 10e | viola and accordion | 2001/2013 | premiere 1 Mar 2013 by Gunilla Odsbøl and Rasmus Schjærff Kjøller in Helsinge Culture House, Helsinge, Denmark | link |
| Image balancantes | 22b | piano quartet | 2004/2013 | premiere 26 Jun 2013 by PAIAN in Nafplion Festival 2013, Vouleftiko, Nafplion, Greece | link |
| Collage de temps | 41b | piano duo | 2013 | | link |
| Nocturne | 25d | cello and piano | 2007/2013 | premiere 20 Oct 2013 by Duo Shaw-Magnussen in the Royal Danish Academy of Music, Study Scene | link |
| 5 momenti mobile | 42 | accordion duo and piano trio | 2013 | premiere 11 Sep 2013 by Mythos with piano trio in Concert Hall, Royal Danish Academy of Music, Copenhagen | link |
| 5 momenti mobile | 42b | cello and piano | 2013 | | link |
| Momentum | 43b | recorder, bouzouki, accordion and cello | 2014/15 | premiere 11 Juli 2015 by Kottos in Frederiksværk Musikfestival, Gjethuset, Frederiksværk, Denmark | link |
| Resonance | 45 | guitar trio | 2015 | premiere Oct 2015 by Copenhagen Guitar Trio in Iceland | link |
| Between | 46 | violin and guitar | 2016 | premiere 10 Dec 2016 by Den Dansk-Australske Duo in Metronomen, Frederiksberg, Denmark | link |
| Sort sol (murmuration) | 48 | guitar and accordion | 2016 | premiere 22 Aug 2018 by Bjarke Mogensen, Mikkel Egelund Nielsen in Aa Kirke, Aakirkeby, Bornholm, Denmark | link |
| Smoke | 8b | piano quartet | 2000/2018 | premiere 25 Jun 2018 by Lohse Quartet in Montmartre, Copenhagen, Denmark | link |
| Fast track | 49 | sheng and accordion | 2017 | premiere 29 Nov 2017 by Wu Wei and Geir Draugsvoll in Study Scene, Royal Danish Academy of Music | link |
| Fast track | 49c | guitar duo | 2017/2018 | premiere 15 Aug 2018 by Aros Guitar Duo in Vendsyssel Festival, Denmark | link |
| Koncert | 10f | violin and accordion | 2001/2018 | | link |
| Koncert | 10g | flute and accordion | 2001/2018 | | link |
| Koncert | 10h | piano quartet | 2001/2018 | premiere 25 Jul 2019 by Lohse Ensemble in Bornholms Musikfestival, Aa Kirke, Aakirkeby, Bornholm, Denmark | link |
| Carl Nielsen: Underlige aftenlufte | A-4 | string quartet | 1907/2019 | arrangement for string quartet | link |
| Ver | 55 | guitar duo | 2019 | premiere 23 May 2019 by Aros Guitar Duo in Helsingør Teater, Den Gamle By, Århus, Denmark | link |
| 5 momenti mobile | 42c | accordion and piano quartet | 2013/2019 | premiere 25 Jul 2019 by Bjarke Mogensen and Lohse Ensemble in Bornholms Musikfestival, Aa Kirke, Aakirkeby, Bornholm, Denmark | link |
| Flow | 57 | organ and piano | 2020 | | link |
| Carl Nielsen: Jens Vejmand | A-5 | wind quintet | 1907/2020 | arrangement for wind quintet | link |
| === Solo === | | | | | |
| Draghæ | | piano | 1996 | premiere Dec 1997 by Martin Lohse in Composer soiree, Royal Danish Academy of Music, Denmark | link |
| Sand drifting | 9 | oboe | 2000 | premiere 20 Feb 2001 by Kristine Vestergaard in Composer soiree, Royal Danish Academy of Music, Denmark | link |
| Silenzio | 19 | cello | 2003 | premiere 12 Nov 2011 by Toke Møldrup in Vanløse Kulturhus, Denmark | link |
| 6 preludes | 20 | organ | 2003 | premiere by David Lau Magnussen | link |
| Intermezzo - B.a.c.h. | 24 | piano | 2005 | premiere Dec 2005 by Jens Ramsing | link |
| Nocturne | 25 | piano | 2007 | premiere 20 Sep 2009 by David Lau Magnussen in KUNSTEN Museum of Modern Art, Aalborg | link |
| Hymn | 30b | percussion (carillon) | 2009 | | link |
| Silenzio | 19b | viola | 2003/2010 | | link |
| Silenzio | 19c | violin | 2003/2010 | | link |
| Moto immoto versione tranguile | 35c | accordion | 2009/2011 | premiere 6 Apr 2011 by Rasmus Schjærff Kjøller in Kastelskirken, Copenhagen, Denmark | link |
| Passing | 36 | accordion | 2011-12 | premiere 27 Sep 2011 by Bjarke Mogensen in Louisiana Museum of Modern Art, Humlebæk, Denmark | link |
| Turn | 38 | piano | 2011 | premiere 14 Mar 2013 by David Lau Magnussen in Pulsar Festival, Studiescenen, Royal Danish Academy of Music, Denmark | link |
| Silenzio | 40 | accordion | 2003/2012 | premiere 14 Jul 2012 by Bjarke Mogensen in Frederiksværk Festival, Denmark | link |
| Cadenza | 29c | accordion | 2010/2012 | premiere 14 Jul 2012 by Bjarke Mogensen in Frederiksværk Festival, Denmark | link |
| 6 preludes | 20b | accordion | 2003/2013 | premiere 14 Jul 2012 by Bjarke Mogensen | link |
| 6 preludes | 20c | piano | 2003/2013 | | link |
| Momentum | 43 | accordion | 2014 | premiere by Bjarke Mogensen | link |
| Menuetto | 27b.5 | accordion | 2008/2014 | premiere by Bjarke Mogensen | link |
| The Dying Child | 4b | accordion | 1998/2014 | premiere 26 Nov 2014 by Bjarke Mogensen in Pavillonsalen, Kulturhuset Pavillonen, Grenå, Denmark | link |
| Match Girl | 44 | accordion | 2015 | premiere by Hanzhi Wang | link |
| Seasons | 47 | accordion | 2016 | Four parts: Late Spring; Summer Storm; Autumn Rain; Winter's Tale; premiere by Geir Draugsvoll | link |
| Fast Track | 49b | organ | 2017 | premiere 17 Sep 2017 by David Lau Magnussen in Hareskov Kirke, Denmark | link |
| Three pieces | 50 | piano | 2017-18 | Three parts: Prelude; Nocturne; Serenade; premiere 21 Jun 2018 by Anne Mette Stæhr in Ribe Kunstmuseum, Denmark | link |
| Encircled | 52 | accordion | 2018 | premiere 22 Oct 2018 by Hanzhi Wang in Carnegie Hall, New York | link |
| L'eau | 54 | guitar | 2019 | dedicated to Niklas Johansen | link |
| === Choir === | | | | | |
| Carl Nielsen: Fordum var der fred på gaden | A-7 | 4-part choir | 1905/2019 | arrangement in modern diatonic style | link |
| Carl Nielsen: Fordum var der fred på gaden | A-6 | 4-part choir | 1905/2019 | arrangement | link |
| Utroligheds frø | 15 | 4-part choir | 2002 | psalm, poem by Ole Sarvig | link |
| Three haiku | 7 | 12-part choir | 1999-2000 | poems by Hans-Jørgen Nielsen (adaption from original haiku poems) | link |
| Det døende Barn | 4 | 4-part choir | 1998 | poem by H.C. Andersen | link |
| === Solo voices/voices with players === | | | | | |
| For at forfølge det håb... (To pursue the hope...) | 1 | mezzo-soprano and violin | 1997 | poem by Kim Mortensen, premiere 16 Mar 1997 in Danish Radio | link |
| Menneskets tråde | 16 | mezzo-soprano | 2002 | poem by Martin Lohse, premiere 13 Nov 2002 in the Black Diamond, Royal Library, Copenhagen | link |
| Mountain of Frigiliana | 53 | mezzo-soprano and accordion | 2018 | poem by Martin Lohse, premiere 2019 by Andrea Pellegrini and Bjarke Mogensen | link |
| === Electroacoustic with instruments === | | | | | |
| Tempo de hielo | 2b | clarinet, violin, contrabass and electronic | 1997/2002 | premiere 15 Feb 2002 by Contemporanea at the composer biennial, Copenhagen | link |
| Entity | 14a-c | violin and delays, viola and delays or cello and delays | 2002 | premiere (violin version) 28 Sep 2002 by Christine Pryn at Warsaw Autumn 2002, Polen | link |
| Change ringing | 31 | clarinet/bass clarinet, vibraphone, harp and electronic | 2009 | premiere 1 Nov 2009 by Adapter at Wundergrund Festival, Copenhagen | link |
| Wood on Strings | 32 | string quartet and delays | 2010 | premiere27 Feb 2010 by Messerkvartetten at Den Collinske Gård, Copenhagen | link |
| Speed | 33 | marimba and nine delays | 2010 | premiere 15 May 2010 by Ars Nova, Malmø at LitteraturHaus, Copenhagen | link |
| Around | 39 | flute and delays | 2011 | premiere 30 Oct 2011 by Hélène Navasse at National Gallery of Denmark | link |
| The Earth and the Sea | 56 | cello and delays | 2019 | premiere 26 Sep 2019 by Ida Nørholm at National Gallery of Denmark | link |
| === Pure electroacoustic === | | | | | |
| Vibration in blue and yellow | E-1 | tape | 2000 | premiere 28 Apr 2000 at The Royal Danish Academy of Music, Copenhagen | link |
| Vibration in blue and yellow II | E-2 | tape | 2000 | premiere 15 Dec 2000 at ARTRA-festival, Den Anden Opera, Copenhagen | link |
| Salme 22 | E-3 | tape | 2004 | premiere 9 May 2004 in Church of Our Lady, Copenhagen | link |
| Slow movement | E-4 | tape | 2004 | premiere 9 May 2004 in Church of Our Lady, Copenhagen | link |
| Sorrow | E-5 | tape | 2006 | premiere 6 Apr 2007 in Church of Our Lady, Copenhagen | link |
| Moto immoto | E-6 | tape | 2009 | premiere 20 Aug 2009 at National Gallery of Denmark | link |
| === Soundtracks === | | | | | |
| Timezones - Explained by Use of Light | S-1 | soundtrack (movie) | 2003 | Director Nikolai Østergaard | link |
| Danmarks sjoveste mand | S-2 | soundtrack (movie) | 2005 | Director Mads Kamp Thulstrup | link |

== Sources ==
- Lohse, Martin (2009). Works 1996-2009 Mirror Music, Copenhagen ISMN 979-0-706798-00-4
