= Admiral of the Realm =

Noble title in Denmark-Norway, Sweden and Holy Roman Empire

Admiral of the Realm was a military and political title given to nobles in Denmark-Norway (Danish: Rigsadmiral), Sweden (Swedish: Riksamiral) and Holy Roman Empire (German: Reichsadmiral).

== Denmark-Norway and Sweden ==
Almost at the same time in the 1570s, both Sweden and in Denmark-Norway created the Admiral of the Realm, and almost simultaneously it was abolished in both kingdoms in the 1670s again. In both kingdoms the Admiral of the Realm was Supreme Commander of all naval forces and chairman of the admiralty. Like the Marshal of the Realm, the Reichsadmiral was also one of the treasures of the country. As a member of the Privy Council, he was comparable to a senior government official, such as a minister of the navy.

=== Denmark-Norway ===
Commander-in-chiefs (Danish: øverste kaptajn) of the Danish-Norwegian fleets, appointed by the King, had existed since the beginning of the 16th century. In 1576, Peder Munk was appointed the first time Admiral of the Realm (Danish: Rigsens Admiral, Rigets Admiral or Rigsadmiral) for Denmark-Norway. The position was created to serve as Commander-in-chief of the navy.

==== List of Danish Admirals of the Realm ====
Acting

Portrait	Name (birth–death)	Term of office			Ref.
Portrait	Name (birth–death)	Appointed	Dismissed	Time in office	Ref.
	Peder Munk (1534–1623)	1576	January 1609	32–33 years	
	Mogens Ulfeldt (1569–1616)	January 1609	15 June 1616 †	7 years, 5 months	
	Albret Skeel (1572–1639)	1 December 1616	1623	6–7 years	
	Claus Daa (1579–1641)	25 July 1630	30 March 1641 †	10 years, 8 months	
	Jørgen Vind (1593–1644)	April 1643	8 July 1644 †	1 year, 3 months	
	Ove Gjedde (1594–1660)	19 March 1645	19 December 1660 †	15 years, 9 months	
	Henrik Bielke (1615–1683)	December 1660	May 1662	1 year, 5 months	
	Henrik Bielke (1615–1683)	May 1662	16 March 1683 †	20 years, 10 months	

=== Sweden ===
The Swedish Admiral of the Realm (Swedish: Riksamiral) was a prominent and influential office in Sweden, from c. 1571 until 1676, excluding periods when the office was out of use. The office holder was a member of the Swedish Privy Council and the head of the navy and Admiralty of Sweden. From 1634, the Lord High Admiral was one of five Great Officers of the Realm.

== See also ==
- Marshal of the Realm
- Marshal of the Realm (Sweden)
- Marshal of the Realm (Denmark)
- Admiral of France
- Lord High Admiral (disambiguation)
