= Bolette =

Bolette is a feminine given name. Notable people with the name include:

- Bolette Gjør (1835–1909), Norwegian writer and missionary
- Bolette Roed (born 1979), Danish musician
- Bolette Sutermeister Petri (1920–2018), Danish-Swiss travel writer

== See also ==
- Bolete, a mushroom
