= Order of the Armed Arm =

Danish order

Order of the Armed Arm Væbnede Arms Orden
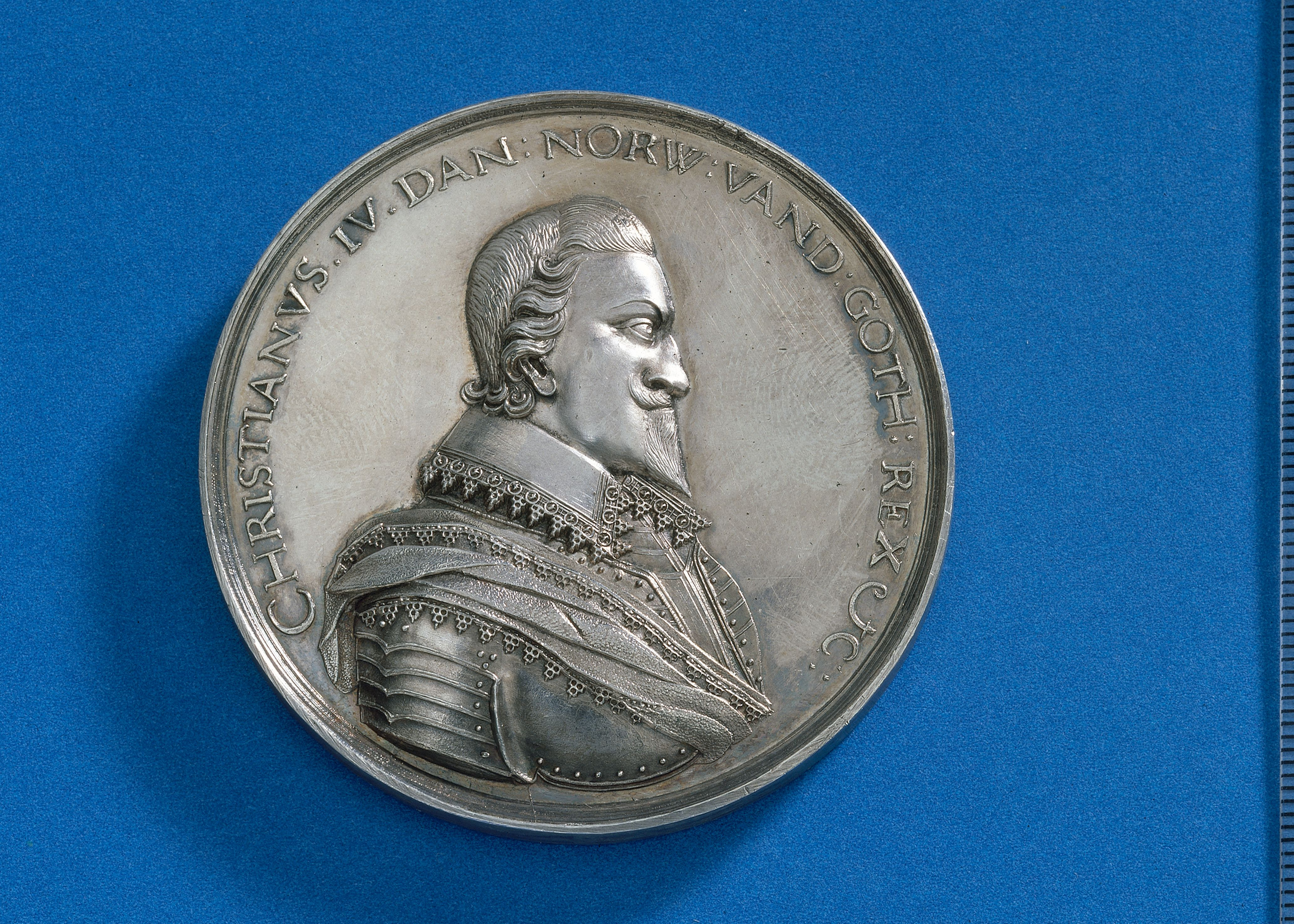

Awarded by Christian IV of Denmark
- Type: Chivalric order in one class
- Established: 2 December 1616
- Awarded for: Military virtues
- Status: Disestablished
- Grades: Ridder

Statistics
- Total inductees: 12
- Order of the Armed Arm ribbon

The Danish Order of the Armed Arm (den Væbnede Arms Orden) was a Danish order of chivalry, instituted by Christian IV of Denmark 1616, when twelve noblemen were knighted. After that occasion, no new knights of the order were made, and it was merged with the Order of the Elephant in 1633–1634. The order is regarded as a predecessor of the Order of the Dannebrog.

== Establishment ==
The order was bestowed for the first and only time on 2 December 1616, at the great celebrations that took place in Kolding, on the occasion of the enfeoffment of Slesvig to the King's nephew, Frederick III, Duke of Holstein-Gottorp. Although this was the first time the order came into use, it is assumed that it was created to celebrate the happy outcome of the Kalmar War. The twelve men knighted were all noblemen who had distinguished themselves during the war.

== Recipients ==
The recipients dignities are those held during the Kalmar war, and at the time of the knighting.

- Anders Bille, Rittmester in the war; Rigsråd 1616, swore the oath as Rigsråd at the knighting in Kolding.
- Christen Friis, Captain of Foot, Quartermaster, Military Governor; Chancellor of the Realm 1616, Rigsråd 1616, swore the oath in Kolding.
- Jørgen Lunge, Colonel of Foot; Rigsmarsk. 1616, Rigsråd 1616, swore the oath in Kolding.
- Marqvardt Pentz, Rittmester; Landråd in Holsten, Amtmann of Segeberg.
- Breide Rantzau (1556-1618), Rigsråd 1581, Statholder of Copenhagen.
- Ditlev Rantzau, Hofmarskal, and as such Rittmester of the Life Guards (Kongens Hoffane); Landråd in Holsten, Amtmann of Steinburg and Southern Dithmarschen.
- Gert Rantzau, Colonel of Foot; Statholder of Slesvig and Holsten (brother of Breide Rantzau).
- Anders Sincklar, Captain of Foot; Colonel of Foot, lensherre (became Rigsråd 1617).
- Ulrik Sandberg, Rittmester before, during, and after the Kalmar war.
- Jens Sparre, Generalvagtmester; Lensherre of Christianstad.
- Albret Skeel, Rittmester; Admiral of the Realm 1616, Rigsråd 1616, swore the oath in Kolding.
- Jørgen Skeel, Lieutenant of Horse; Rittmester (brother of the above).

== Disestablishment ==
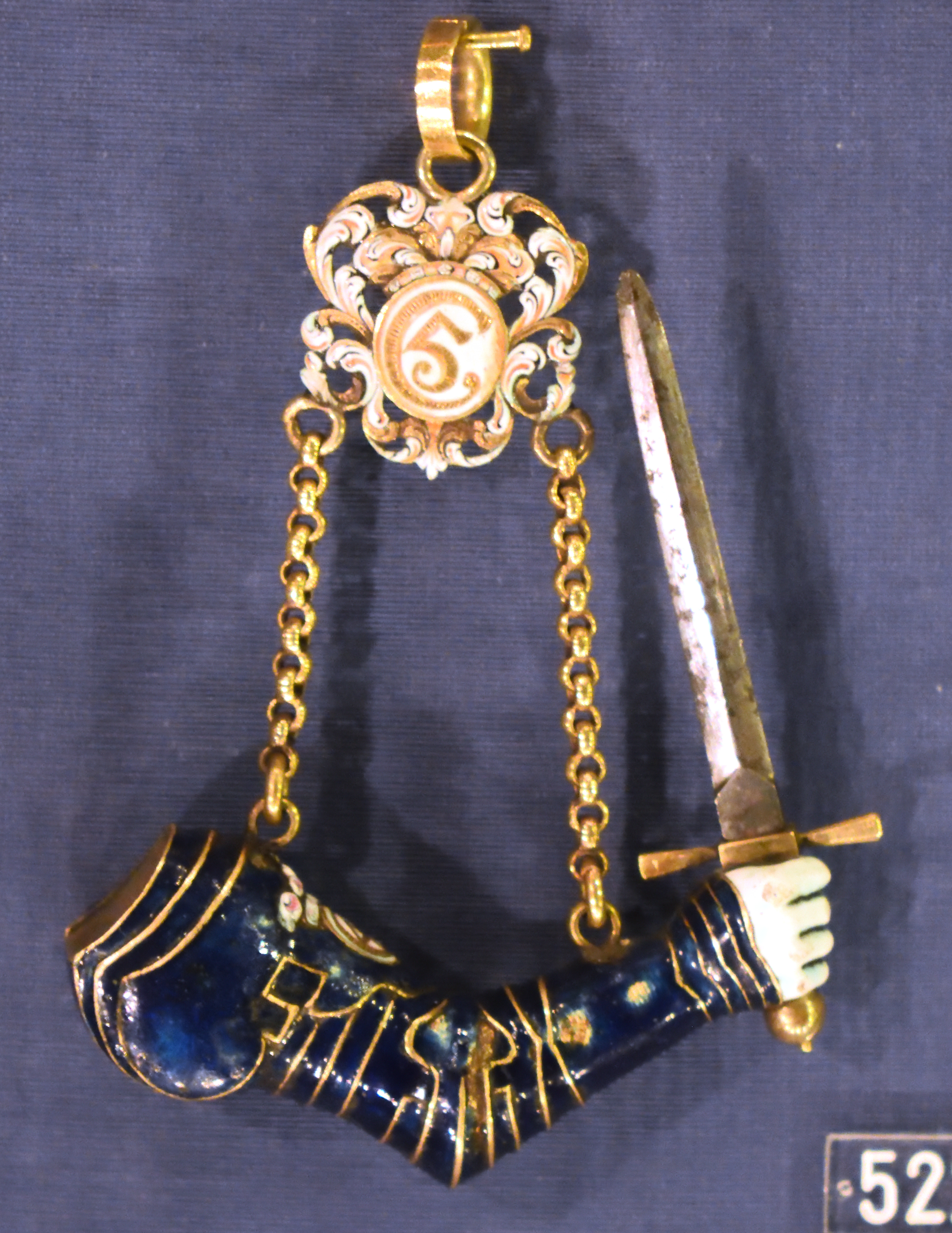
This badge of the order has Christian V's monogram.

The badges of the Order of the Elephant issued in 1633, were on the reverse augmented by the badge of the Order of the Armed Arm. At the next year's issue, it was, however, removed. In 1634 Christian IV offered the two still living knights, Christen Friis and Albret Skeel, to exchange the Armed Arm for the Elephant. There is also one specimen of the order, with the monogram of Christian V, which suggest that he considered reviving the order. Instead he created the order of the Dannebrog in 1671.

== Insignia ==
The badge of the order was worn around the neck in a blue ribbon. It consisted of two chains hanging from a clasp; at the end of the chains were a diamond studded armour-plated arm, holding a drawn sword. Therefore, the order has also been called "Order of the Drawn Sword" or "Order of the Sword". It bears the year 1617, the centenary of Martin Luther's 95 theses, and symbolizes the struggle for protestantism. The badge itself may, therefore, have been made and issued in 1617.
