= Albret Skeel =

State Admiral of Denmark (1572–1639)

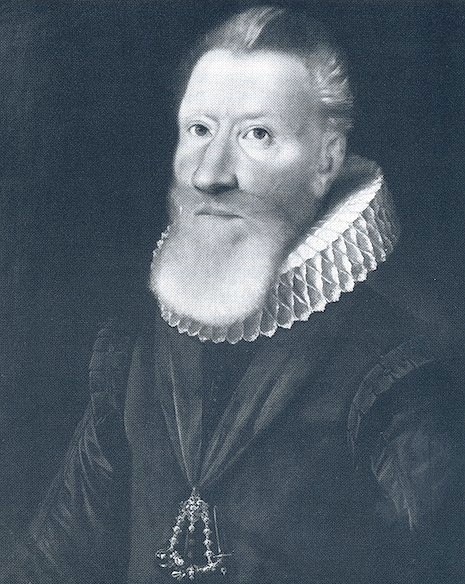
- Portrait of Albret Skeel at the Frederiksborg Museum

Admiral of the Realm
- In office 1616–1623
- Monarch: Christian IV
- Preceded by: Mogens Ulfeldt
- Succeeded by: ?

Personal details
- Born: 23 November 1572 Fussingø
- Died: 9 April 1639 (aged 66) Riberhus
- Profession: Courtier, military officer
- Awards: Knight of the Armed Arm

Albret Skeel (23 November 1572 – 9 April 1639) was a Danish nobleman who held the office of Admiral of the Realm from 1616 to 1623.

== Early life and travels ==
Albret Skeel was born at Fussingø on 23 November 1572 as the son of Privy Councillor Christen Albrechtsøn Skeel, til Bøvling Len (1543-1595) and Margrethe Ottesdatter Brahe, 2nd (1551-1614). He attended Viborg School from the age of 9 and until 1585 when he was sent abroad to further his education, studying in Strasbourg, Padua and Siena before returning home by way of France and England.

Back in Denmark, Skeel was appointed squire at King Christian IV's court. In 1597 he escorted the king on his journey to Brandenburg to marry Anne Catherine of Brandenburg, and the following year the king's brother, Duke Ulrik, on a journey to France, England and Scotland. In 1599 he was appointed royal cup-bearer and over the next few years accompanied the king on several more journeys.

== In war and politics ==
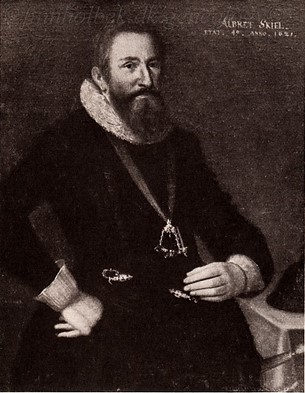
Albert Skeel.

In 1616, after distinguishing himself in the Kalmar War from 1611 to 1613, he was appointed as Admiral of the Realm and a member of the Privy Council. In 1618 he was sent on a mission to Gottorp and in 1620 to Bremen and that same year he commanded a fleet in the North Sea.

In the 1620 he embarked on criticism of Christian IV's foreign policies and, after a confrontation with the king, was forced to resign. In 1629 he was a commissioner at the peace negotiations at Lübeck, and in 1631 and 1632 he was present at the Swedish peace negotiations at Lübeck. He died on 9 April 1639 and is buried at Ribe Cathedral.

== Holdings ==
Skeel held Riberhus as a fief from 1601 to 1627 and again from 1628 to 1639. He acquired Katholm Manor in 1616.

== Family ==
Skeel was married to Berte Nielsdatter Friis Af Hesselager (1583-1652). They were the parents of the following children:

- Christen Albretsen Skeel (1603-1659), landowner and pricy councillor
- Otte Skeel, til Broholm, Katholm & Hessel (1605-1644)
- Anne Albertsdatter Skeel, til Hegnet, Halkær, Krastrup etx (1607-1662), married to Manderup Due (Taube), til Halkjær, Krastrup og Sønderskov (1598-1660)
- Margrethe Albretsdatter Skeel (1626-1647), married to Erik Holgersen Rosenkrantz (1612-1681)
- Christoffer Albretsen Skeel (1604 - 1622)
- Karen Albretsdatter Skeel (1611-1627)
