= Jørgen Lunge =

Danish nobleman and Rigsmarsk 1616–1619 (1577–1619)

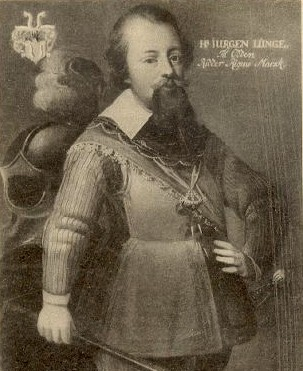
- Jørgen Lunge

Rigsmarsk
- In office 1616–1619
- Monarch: Christian IV
- Preceded by: Steen Maltesen Sehested
- Succeeded by: Jørgen Skeel (from 1627)

Personal details
- Born: 11 October 1577 Odden Manor, Jutland, Denmark
- Died: 19 August 1619 (aged 41) Birkelse, Denmark
- Resting place: Abbey of Our Lady, Aalborg
- Awards: Knight of the Armed Arm

Jørgen Lunge (11 October 1577 – 19 August 1619) was a Danish nobleman who served as Marshal of the Realm (Danish: Rigsmarsk) from 1616 until his death in 1619. Lunge owned estates and large amounts of land in Vendsyssel-Thy.

Having been born into the Lunge noble family, he received an extensive education before entering into military service in 1600. Following his success in the Kalmar War, Lunge was appointed to the Council of State and made Marshal of the Realm by King Christian IV. During his tenure as Marshal of the Realm, the council was increasingly at odds with the crown. Lunge was in favor of a comparatively pacifistic approach to foreign policy, which would have offered economic stability to noble estate owners like himself.

Lunge strategically married into the Brahe family by marrying Sophie Brahe in 1605. The couple had nine children together. Their only son died without any heirs. Therefore, Lunge's vast estate was inherited by his wife and their daughters.

== Early life and education ==
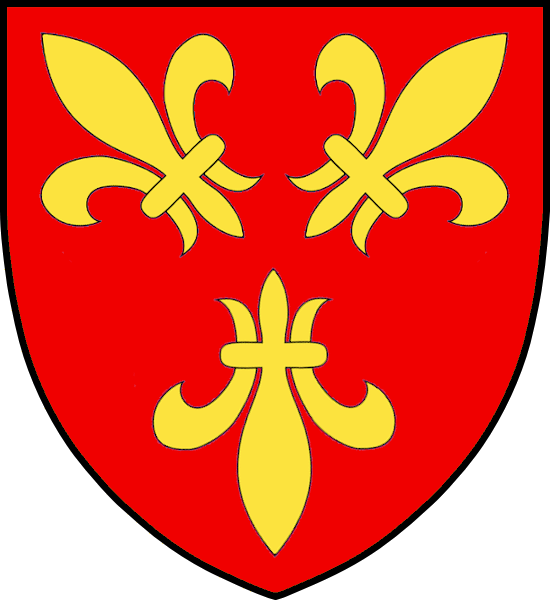
Coat of arms of the Lunge noble family

Lunge was born in Odden Manor near Hjørring on 11 October 1577 to Ove Lunge (1548–1601) and Anne Maltesdatter Sehested (1554–1621). Jørgen was the third of nine children. After receiving his schooling at home in Viborg and at Sorø Academy he spent six years abroad with his older brother, Christoffer Lunge.

He began his travels in Geneva in 1594. He then left for Orléans in 1595 and Paris in 1596. He spent time between Padua and Rome in 1597 and 1598. Because of his travels, Lange had a more worldly background than many of his peers in the Danish nobility. He was fluent in French and had studied foreign politics and customs. While in France, he is said to have served as a soldier for Henry IV, allegedly rising to great acclaim there.

== Career ==
Shortly after his return to Denmark in 1600, he left the country once again to go into Dutch military service. Before his departure, he recruited a company of soldiers which he led with honours in the Eighty Years' War. Arriving in the Netherlands in 1605, he served under Maurice, Prince of Orange. In his service, he was promoted to the rank of major, and then colonel.

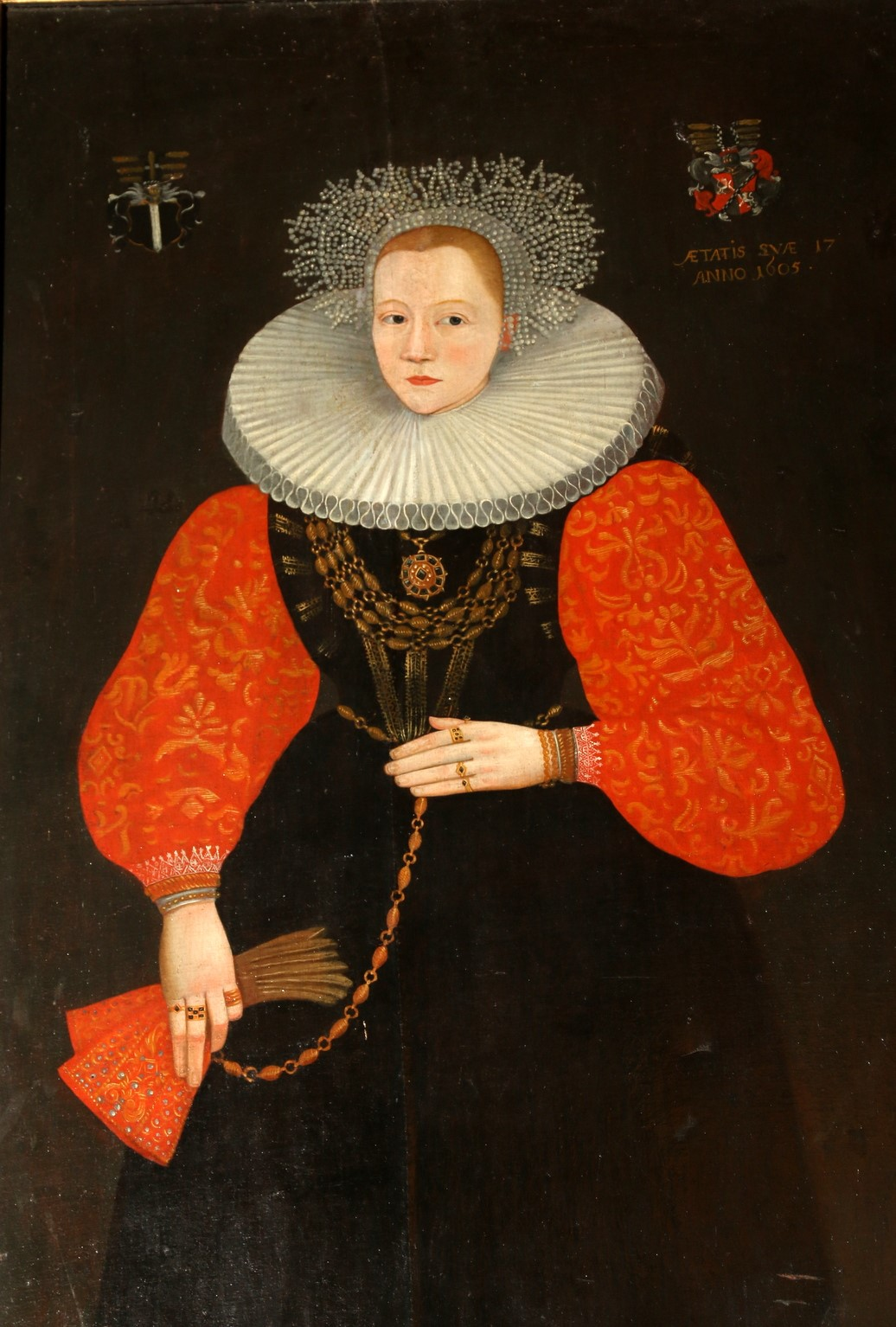
Sophie Lunge, née Brahe.

Following continued requests from his mother, Lunge returned home and promptly was married to Sophie Brahe in September 1605. Just a few weeks later, he received orders to recruit a regiment of 2,000 men for use against the city of Brunswick in support of the king's relative, Henry Julius, Duke of Brunswick-Lüneburg. However, the king abandoned his plan and the regiment was dissolved. On his way back to Denmark from the Holy Roman Empire, Lunge was captured by forces of the Hanseatic League, and was forced to buy his freedom.

At the onset of the Kalmar War, Lunge again took the opportunity to return to action. He recruited two companies in the Netherlands. Alongside these two companies he was involved in the Siege of Älvsborg. He recruited more troops in Germany in the spring of 1612, thus forming a complete regiment under his command. In June 1612, he made an incursion into Västergötland and was made commander of Old Älvsborg and lord of its castle in August.

=== Marshal of the Realm ===
In December 1616, Lunge was appointed by King Christian IV to the Council of State. By secret ballot, the other members of the council elected him as Marshal of the Realm. The council, however, had not appointed Lunge on its own volition. The position had stood vacant for quite some time; Lunge's appointment was made out of necessity during a time of conflict and to appease the king's wishes.

In his first few years as Marshal of the Realm, Lunge engaged in foreign diplomacy at the king's direction. He conducted negotiations with the Holy Roman Empire to secure damming works in Bredstedt, which the king sought for military reasons. In 1618, he negotiated between the Hanseatic League and the Netherlands for the crown's interests in gaining the coadjutor archbishop of Bremen.

In 1618, Lunge's own views on foreign policy became more visibly aligned with the rest of the council, rather than with the king. When it seemed likely that the Swedish would not be able to pay the third instalment of the Älvsborg Ransom in January 1618, he advocated against the king's desire to use military force to seize their lands. In February 1618, Christian IV sought the council's consent to raise a conscripted army of 24,000 men, partially paid for by the tax-free nobility, to attack the Prince-Archbishopric of Bremen. Alongside Christen Friis and Anders Bille, Lunge faced the king's fury by refusing to consent to the offensive.

Increasingly at odds with Christian IV, he pursued his own policy for the council. In particular, he pushed back against the crown's aggressive military use in favor of economic policies that would benefit large estate owners. He, along with much of the council, saw the king's continued aggressions towards the Holy Roman Empire as a resource sink and a distraction from the more imminent threat posed by Sweden, which could upend Denmark's economic position.

Lunge was removed from his post and forced to retire at Vestervig in late 1618. This could have been as punishment for his attempts to make civic advancements that would have undermined the king's own agenda. However, it is also likely that Lunge's failing heath forced his retirement. After Lunge's death in 1619, no new Marshal of the Realm was appointed. Christian IV was likely reluctant to give the council such power again given the increasingly anti-monarchist views of its most influential appointees.

== Personal life ==
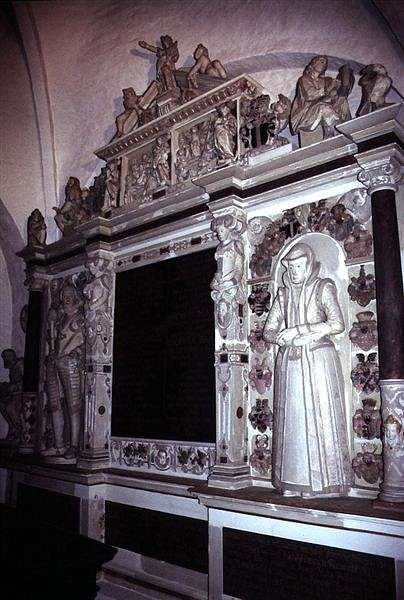
The tomb of Jørgen Lunge and Sophie Lunge at the Abbey of Our Lady, Aalborg

On 8 September 1605, he married Sophie Brahe (1588–1659). Sophie was part of an influential noble family in Denmark as the daughter of Steen Ottesen Brahe and his first wife, Birgitte Rosenkrantz (1555–1588). Jørgen and Sophie had nine children: Birgitte (1607–1628), Kirsten (1608–1637), Sophie (1609–1645), Anne (1610–1652), Lisbet (1610–1659), Ide (1612–1671), Ove (1613–1637), Sidsel (1615–1657), and Margrethe (1616–1653).

Their marriage was strategic for Lunge, and the connection with the Brahe family gave him access to the most influential class in Denmark. Even before his success in the Kalmar War, he was granted power over Vestervig Abbey around 1610, likely as a result of his marriage. In addition to his ancestral estate of Odden, Lunge owned three other landed estates in Jutland: Birkelse, Hessel, and Holmgaard. He also acquired Stensbæk, near Hjørring in the late 1500s. In 1601, he became the owner of Førslevgaard in Nykøbing Mors.

At the end of his life, Lunge acquired a philanthropic interest in public education. In 1619, he advocated for the education of gifted, impoverished schoolchildren and donated 1,000 Rigsdaler to Aalborg Cathedral School.

Jørgen Lunge died on 19 August 1619 in Birkelse and was buried in Aalborg at the Abbey of Our Lady. His only son, Ove Lunge, died in 1637 with no heirs. Much of his property, including his ancestral home of Odden, were therefore inherited by his wife, and thereafter the descendents of their daughters. Jørgen's wife, Sophie, survived him by forty years. Through inheritance, she owned more than 2000 hectares of hard grain, making her a large-scale land owner in her own right.
