= Marshal of the Realm =

Marshal of the Realm may refer to:

- Marshal of the Realm (Denmark)
- Marshal of the Realm (Sweden)
- Reichsmarschall
