= Jørgen Knudsen Urne =

Danish noble (1598–1642)

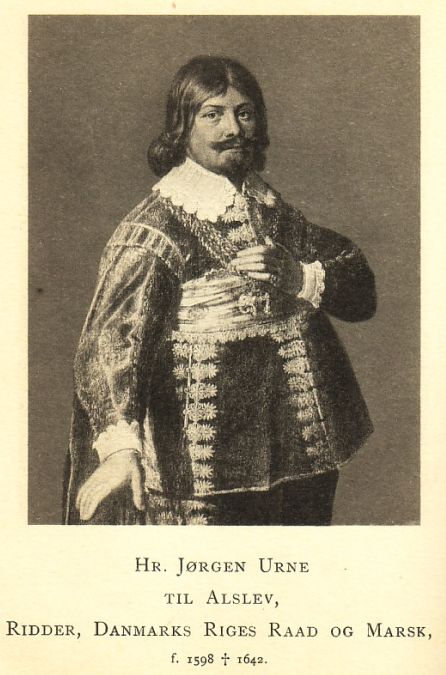
- Jørgen Knudsen Urne

Rigsmarsk
- In office 1632–1642
- Monarch: Christian IV
- Preceded by: Jørgen Skeel
- Succeeded by: Anders Bille

Personal details
- Born: 17 October 1598 Halsted Abbey, Lolland
- Died: 19 February 1642 (aged 43) Lindenborg Manor, Blenstrup
- Profession: Military officer
- Awards: Knight of the Elephant

Jørgen Knudsen Urne (17 October 1598 – 19 February 1642) was a Danish noble who served as Rigsmarsk from 1632 to 1642.

== Biography ==
The son of Knud Axelsen Urne and Margrethe Eilertsdatter Grubbe, Jørgen Knudsen Urne was born on 17 October 1598 at Halsted Abbey which his father held as a fief. When he was nine, he was sent to Herlufsholm boarding school in Næstved and at age 12 he became a Squire first at the court of Queen Anne Catherine and then to King Christian IV. In this capacity, he participated in the Kalmar War and joined the king on his journeys to England in 1614 and Braunschweig in 1615. He became a Junker in 1618 but then went to Bohemia to serve in the war. The Count of Thurn made him a cornet and he participated in the Battle of White Mountain in 1620 before returning home to become a lieutenant in the Royal Danish Army. Over the next couple of years he was sent on minor missions abroad, for example to France and East Friesland.

In 1623, he was granted the Fief of Kronborg and in 1624 became rittmeister in the cavalry. On 16 February 1624, he married Margrethe Ottesdatter Marsvin. In 1627, he was granted Kristianstad in Skåneland instead of Kronborg.

He was elected Rigsmarsk in 1629, became a member of the Privy Council and was granted Vestervig as a fief. He generally opposed the king's war policies but in vain.

By 1633 he had been appointed a knight of the Order of the Elephant and was sent to Saxony where he arranged for the marriage between the Elected Prince Christian and Magdalene Sibylle of Saxony.

== See also ==
- Danish nobility
