= Katholm Castle =

Manor house in Norddjurs Municipality, Denmark

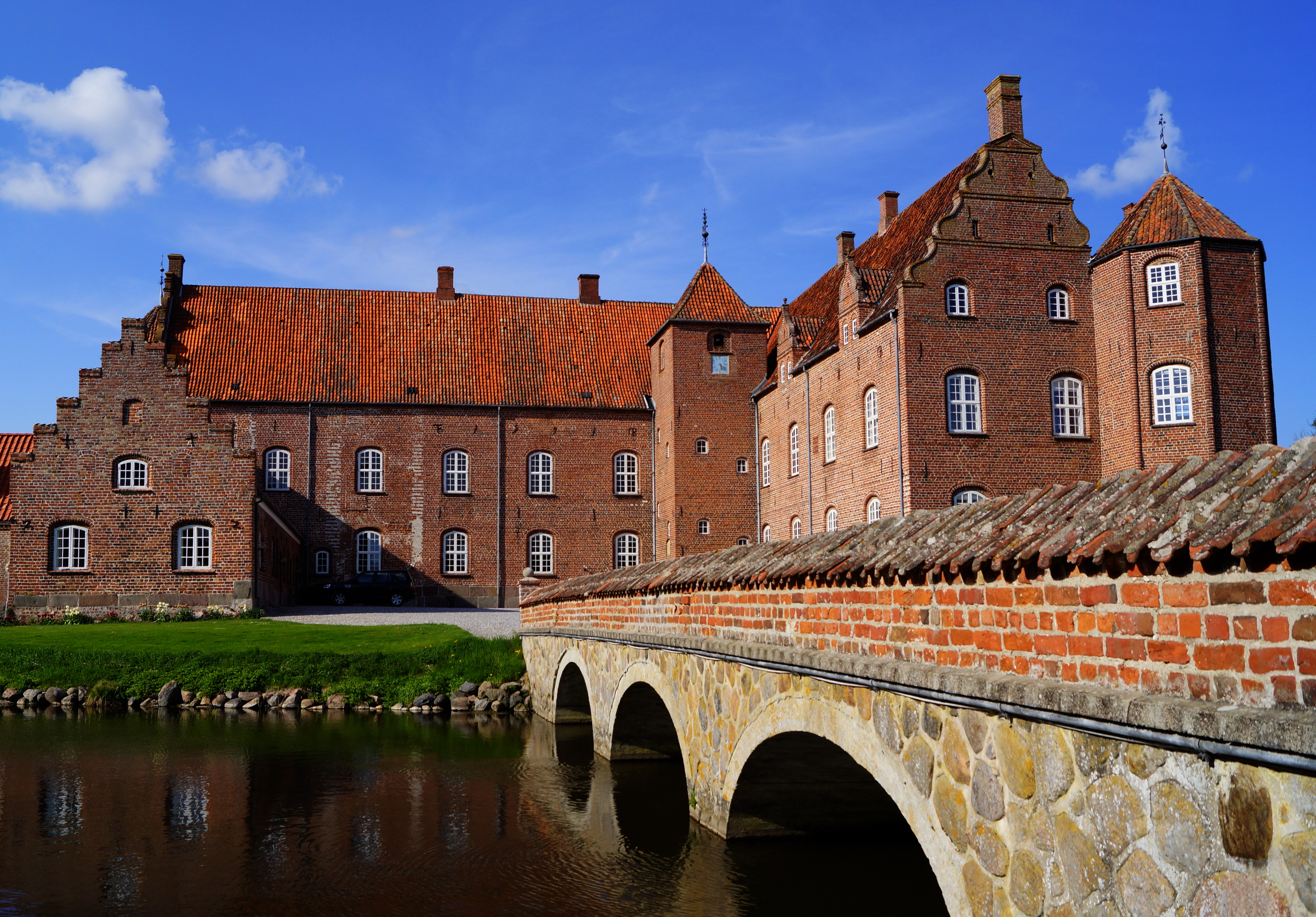
- Katholm viewed from the south

- Location within Denmark

General information
- Architectural style: Renaissance
- Location: Norddjurs Municipality, Denmark
- Coordinates: 56°19′35″N 10°53′33″E
- Construction started: 1588
- Completed: 1591
- Client: Thomas Fasti
- Owner: Marie Therese Collet

Katholm Castle is a manor house located on the Djursland peninsula, six km south of Grenaa, in eastern Denmark. Built in the Renaissance style from 1588 to 1591 and expanded in 1622, it is set on a castle bank in the middle of an artificial lake in a forested area. Wilhelm Dinesen, father of writer Karen Blixen, spent his childhood years at Katholm.

== History ==
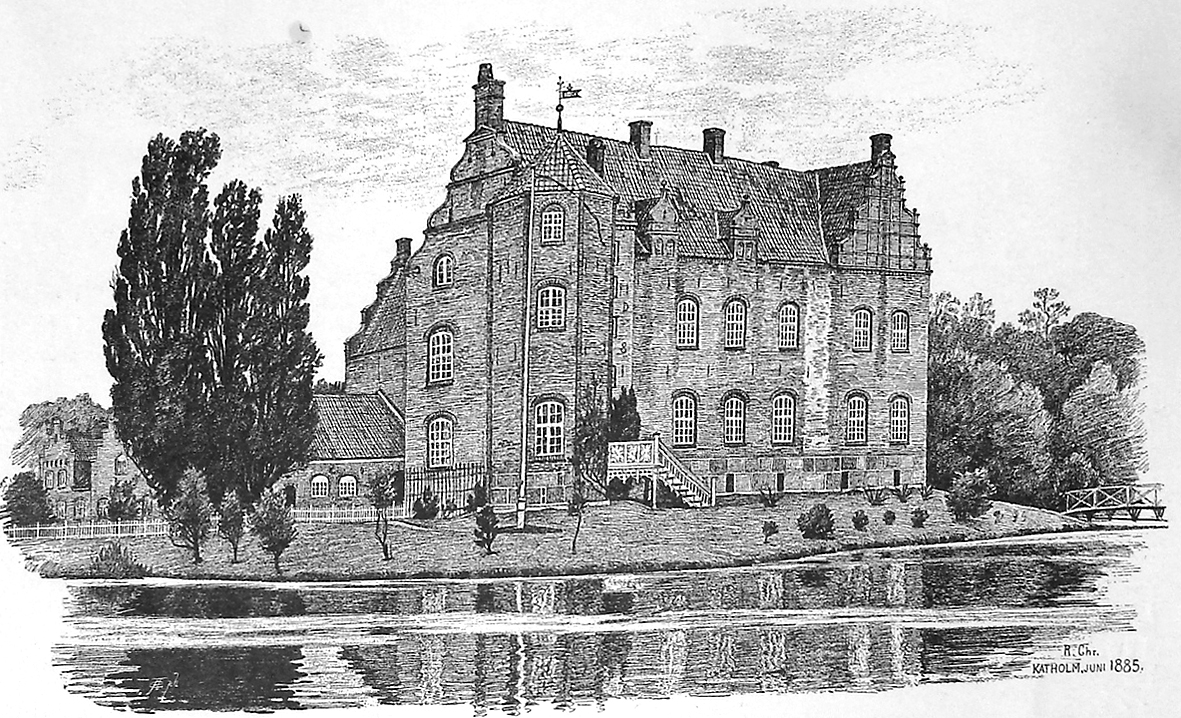
As seen from east - anno 1885

Katholm traces its history as a farm back to the 15th century and was in 1545 turned into a manor house by Christian Fasti. His son, Thomas Fasti, began the construction of today's castle with the completion of the east wing in 1588 and the north wing in 1591. Thomas Fasti died in 1600 but his widow Christence Bryske continued to live at Katholm until her own death in 1611. They are buried in a chapel at the local Alsø church.

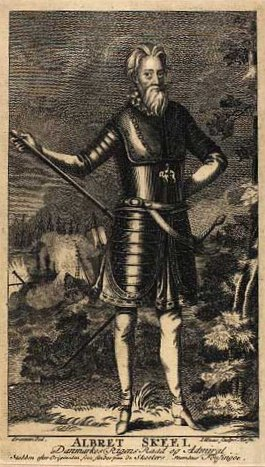
Albret Skeel

Christence Bryske's brother inherited the estate after his sister but when he died a few years later it was passed on to his two sons, Gert and Truid. However, they encountered economic difficulties and in 1616 sold Katholm to Albret Skeel who was appointed Admiral of the Realm and admitted into the Privy Council that same year. He expanded the complex with a low west wing (1622) as well as a large farm south of the house. The estate remained in the possession of the Skeel family for the next few generations but in 1681 Albret Skeel's granddaughter married Jens Maltesen Sehested and when she died in 1684 he bought out his mother in law as well as his brother in law, Christian Reedtz.

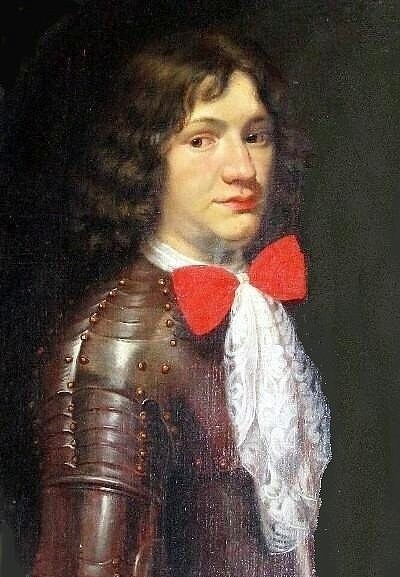
Palle Krag 1657 - 1723

In 1690, Katholm was acquired by Palle Krag who had recently married Helle Nielsdatter Trolle, a wealthy widow. A skilled soldier, Krag had distinguished himself in the Scanian War and would later do so again in the Great Northern War.

Palle Krag and Helle Trolle had no children and when Krag died in 1723, one year after his wife, Katholm was sold to Major-General Poul Rosenørn. After his death in 1737, Katholm was passed on to his widow, Mette, née Benzon, and their son Peder Rosenørn. The last Rosenørn to own Katholm was Mathias Peter Otto Rosenørn who in 1802 sold the estate to Jens Jørgensen, who for many years had been a tenant of Rosenholm Castle. The following decades were a time of financial difficulties for large landowners and in 1823 the State had to take over Katholm along with a number of others estates.

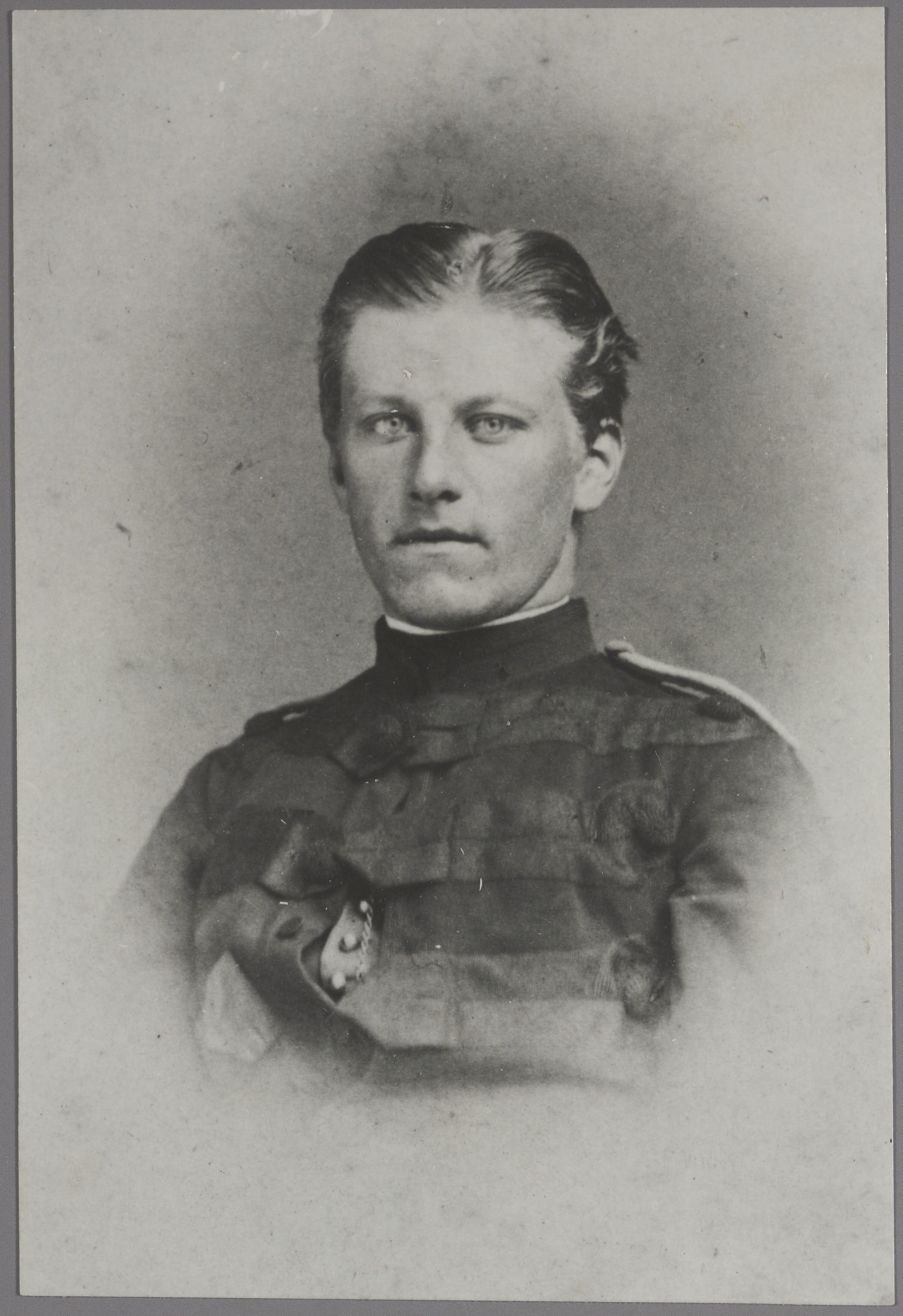
Wilhelm Dinesen, father of Karen Blixen

In December 1839 Katholm was sold on public auction. The buyer was First Lieutenant Adolph Wilhelm Dinesen. An active participant in public life, he was both a councillor and an MP. Dinesen had eight children, including Wilhelm Dinesen, the father of writer Karen Blixen. When Adolph Wilhelm Dinesen died in 1876, his oldest son Wentzel Laurentzius Dinesen took over Katholm while Wilhelm later acquired Rungstedlund north of Copenhagen where Karen Blixen was born.

== Collet era ==
In 1916, Holger Collet acquired Katholm from the daughter of W. F. Dinesen. Holger Collet built a new stable and later a new tenant residence and stable with garage. In 1935 the farm buildings were devastated by fire, which caused substantial damage. In 1942 Carl Frederik Collet took over Katholm the year before the death of his father, C.F. Collet. He reformed the operations, rendering the estate more efficient. Peter Collet took over at Katholm in 1971.

== Architecture ==
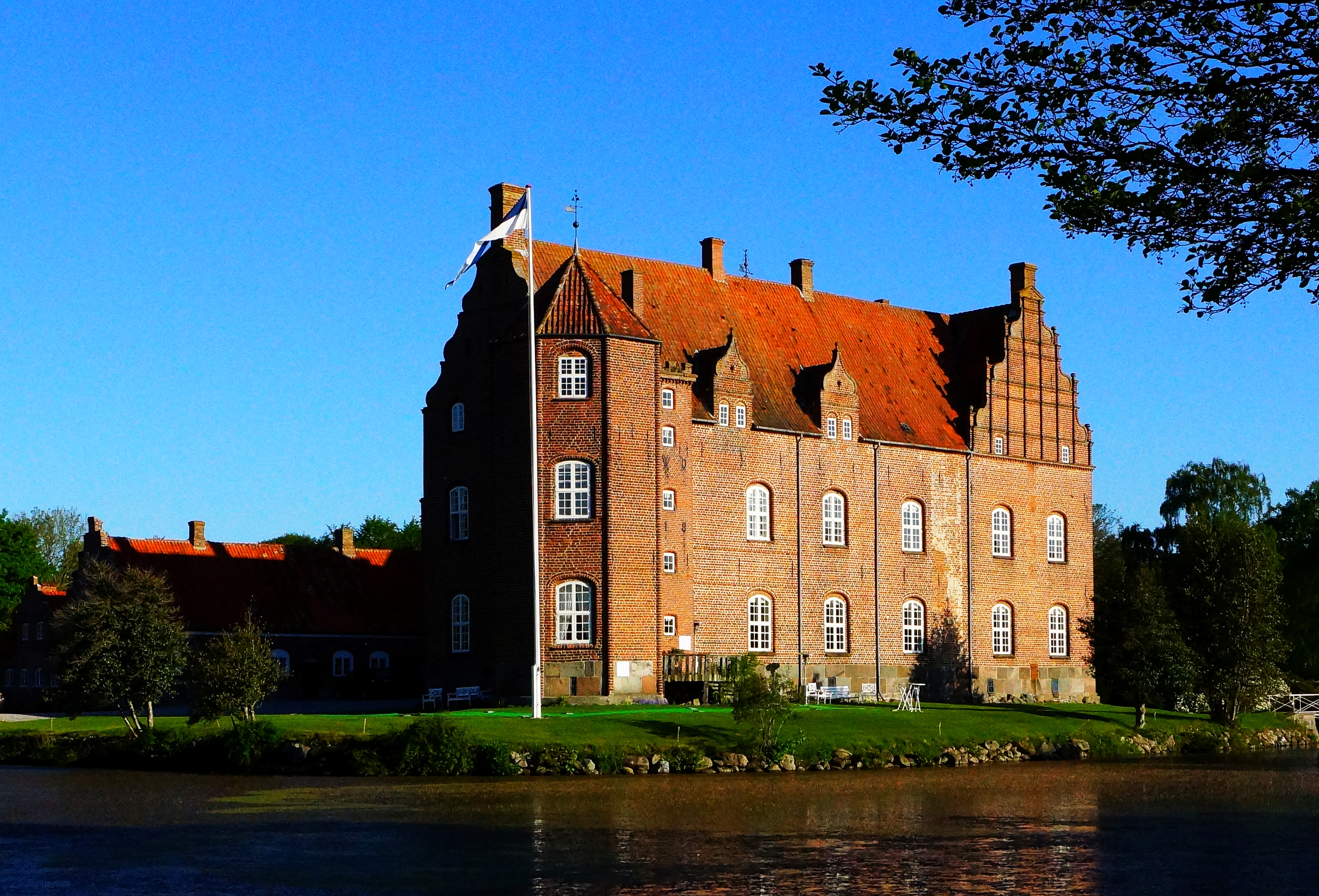
As seen from east - anno 2013

Located on a castle bank in an artificial lake, Katholm consists of three wings built in red brick to a simple Renaissance design. The two capped corner towers and the staircase in the central yard all date from the original house along with the east wing which has a Dutch gable with curved contours. The lower and slightly younger west wing has a crow-stepped gable.

The central yard opens to the south where a bridge in masonry leads across the moat to the remains of the farm, a barn from 1618 and a stable from 1619.

== Katholm Castle today ==
Katholm has since 2007 been owned by Marie Therese Collet, fourth generation of Collets at the manor. The estate covers 1170 hectares.

== Owners ==
- (1545–1557) Christen Fasti
- (1557–1600) Thomas Fasti
- (1600–1611) Christence Fasti née Bryske
- (1611–1613) Carl Bryske
- (1613–1616) Gert Bryske / Truid Bryske
- (1616–1630) Albret Skeel
- (1630–1644) Otte Albretsen Skeel
- (1644–1660) Ida Jørgensdatter Skeel née Lunge
- (1660–1667) Albret Ottesen Skeel
- (1667–1684) Anne Henriksdatter Skeel née Ramel
- (1684–1690) Jens Maltesen Sehested
- (1690–1724) Palle Krag
- (1724–1737) Poul Rosenørn
- (1737–1752) Mette Rosenørn néevon Benzon
- (1752–1776) Peder Poulsen Rosenørn
- (1776–1804) Mathias Peter Otto Rosenørn
- (1804–1813) Jens Jørgensen
- (1813–1818) Herman Leopold Reininghaus
- (1818) Jens Jørgensen
- (1818–1823) Niels Jørgensen / Jacob Bergh Secher
- (1823–1839) Den Danske Stat
- (1839–1876) Adolph Wilhelm Dinesen
- (1876–1916) Wentzel Laurentzius Dinesen
- (1916) Agnes Knuth née Dinesen
- (1916–1942) Holger Collet
- (1942–1971) Carl Frederik Collet
- (1971–2007) Peter Collet
- (2007-) Marie Therese Collet
