= Bjarke Mogensen =

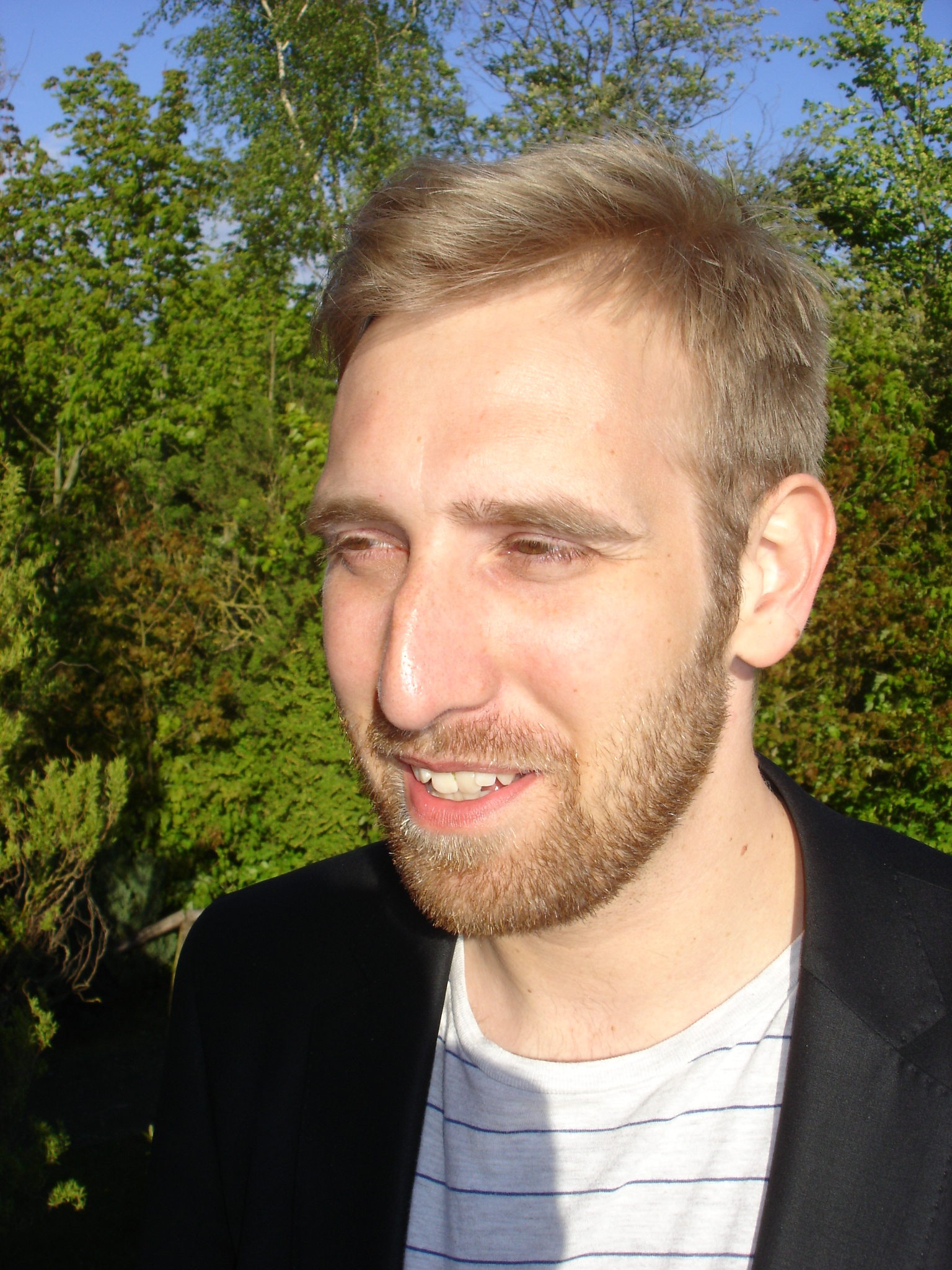
- by Julie Wouvenaar Tovgaard

Background information
- Born: Bjarke Pauli Mogensen; Ronne, Denmark
- Genres: Classical and contemporary music
- Occupation: Musician
- Instrument: Accordion
- Years active: 1998–present
- Labels: Dacapo Records, Orchid Classics
- Website: bjarkemogensen.dk

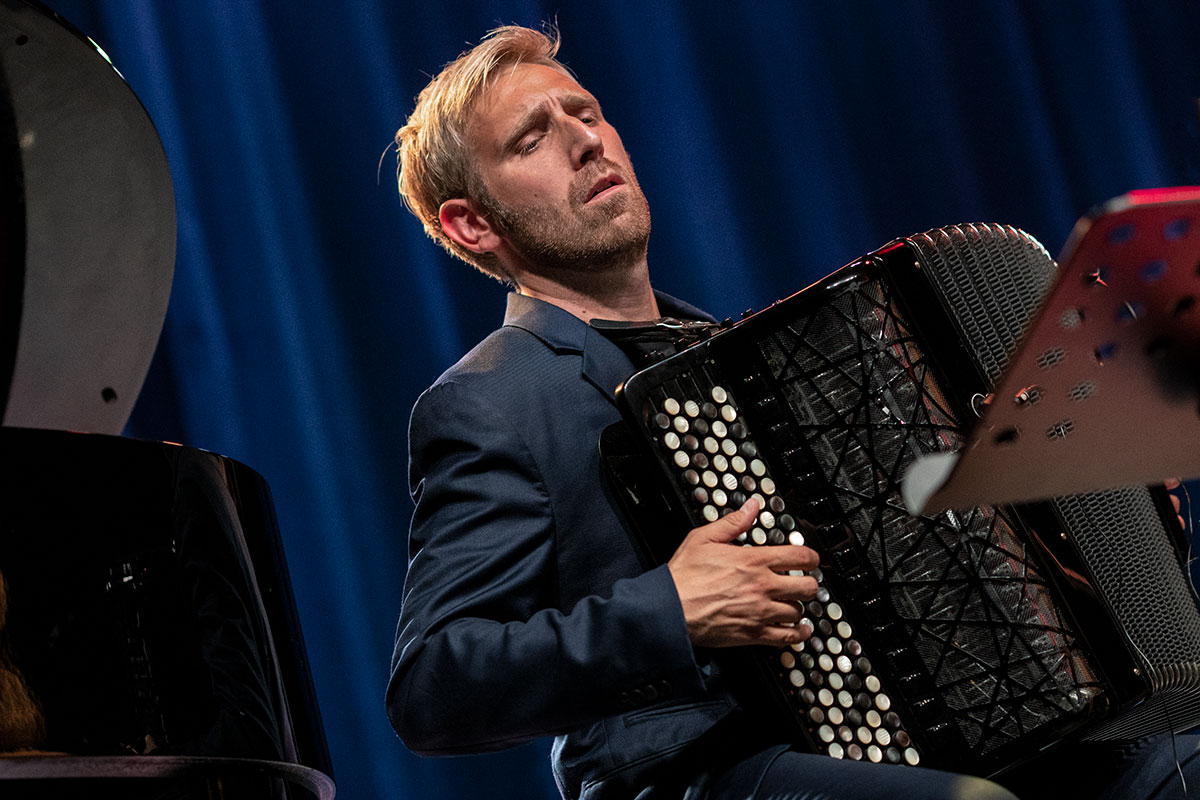
Aarhus Jazz Festival 2021 Foto Hreinn Gudlaugsson

Bjarke Pauli Mogensen (born 27 December 1985 in Ronne) is a Danish accordionist.

== Biography ==
Mogensen began learning the accordion at age 7. At age 13, Mogensen made his debut as a soloist in a German TV broadcast with the Munich Symphony Orchestra. Mogensen studied at the Royal Danish Academy of Music, where his teachers included Geir Draugsvoll.

In 2008, he received a grant of 300,000 DKr from the Statens Kunstråds Musikudvalg (Danish Arts Council Music Committee) in support of his career. In addition to his solo career, Mogensen has served on the music faculty at the Royal Danish Academy of Music since 2010. In May 2011, Mogensen had his solo debut at Carnegie Hall, New York, which included the premiere of Nick Martin's Mother of Sorrows.

Several composers have written works for Mogensen, including Anders Koppel (Concerto Piccolo), Martin Lohse (In Liquid), and Niklas Schmidt (Concertino for accordion and brass). Mogensen has recorded commercially for the Da Capo label, including the commissions from Koppel and Lohse.

== Prizes ==
- Berlingske Classical Music Competition 2000
- Victor Borge Music Prize: 2006
- Culture Bornholm Culture Award: 2006
- The Royal Danish Academy of Musics competition for singers and instrumentalists: 2008
- Danish Radio "Play for Life": 2006
- Gladsaxe Music Prize: 2009
- Léonie Sonning Music Scholarship: 2010
- Danish Radio P2's Chamber Music Competition: 2011 with MYTHOS
- EBU competition "New Talent": 2012
- Almere International Chamber Music Competition: 2012 with MYTHOS

== Grants and scholarships ==
- Jacob Gade Grant: 2000
- Børge Schroeder and Herta Finnerups Music Scholarship: 2001
- Eigil and Aennchen Harbys Fund: 2011
- His Royal Highness Prince Henrik Foundation Grant
