= Abbey of Our Lady, Aalborg =

Former Benedictine monastery in Denmark

Coordinates: 57°2′47.28″N 9°55′26.79″E

Abbey of Our Lady
- Vor Frue Kloster
- Vor Frue Kirke
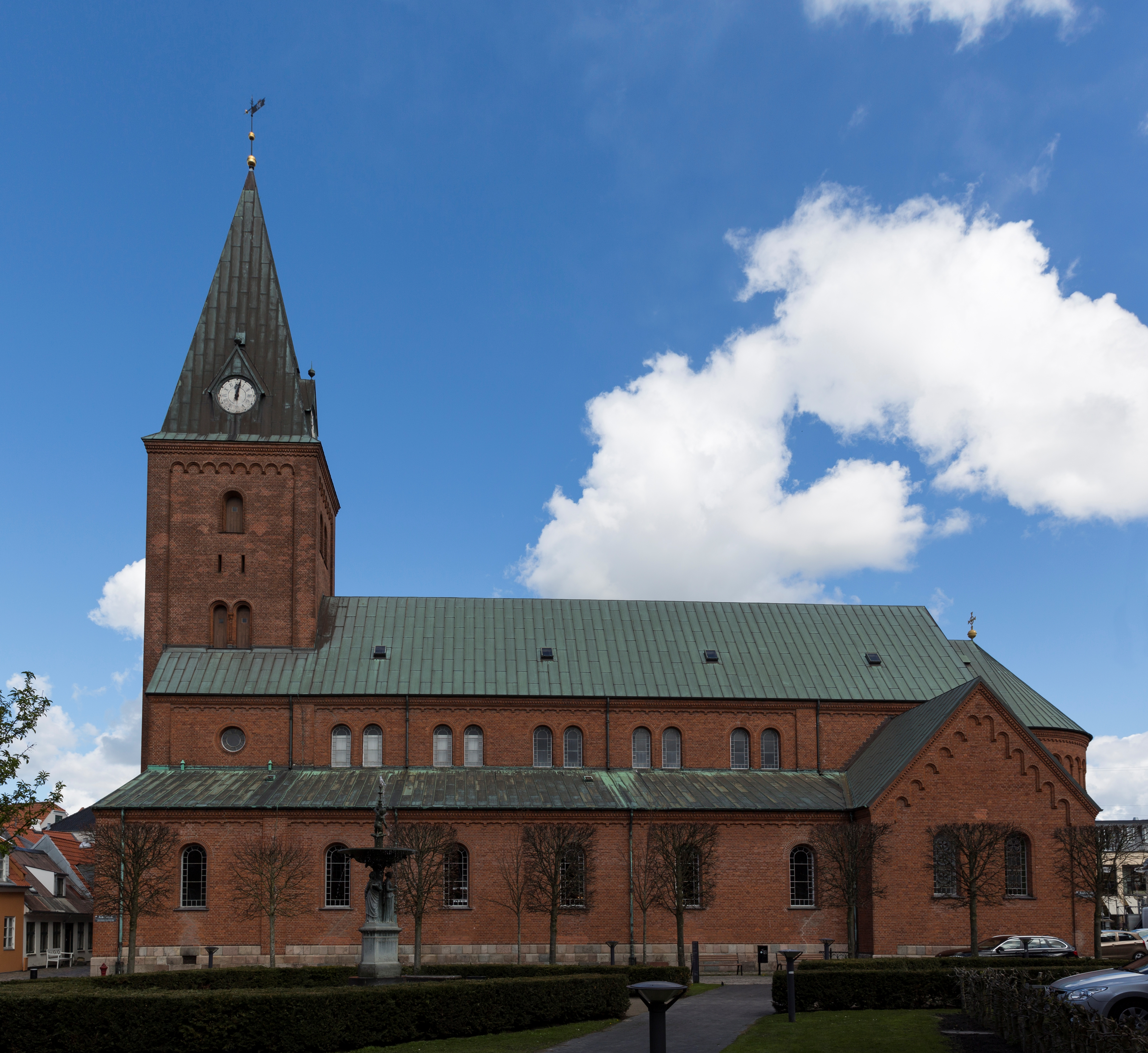
- Abbey of Our Lady
- Location: Aalborg
- Country: Denmark
- Denomination: Church of Denmark

Architecture
- Years built: 1877–1878

Administration
- Diocese: Diocese of Aalborg
- Deanery: Aalborg Budolfi Provsti
- Parish: Vor Frue Sogn

The Abbey of Our Lady, Aalborg (Danish: Vor Frue Kloster) was an early Benedictine monastery in Aalborg, Denmark. The former monastic church survived a parish church until 1876 when it was demolished. The present Vor Frue Kirke was built on the site between 1877 and 1878.

== History ==
=== Vor Frue Kloster ===
Aalborg was the area's largest town and the abbey was built on property donated by the diocese. Nor is it clear whether the early nuns were in fact Benedictines. In 1140 Sigurd Slembe, pretender to the Norwegian throne, was buried inside the abbey church, as recorded by the priest Kjeld Kalv, known while serving at the church for his piety. The abbey over time developed into a complex consisting of a large church and three ranges forming a rectangular enclosure to separate the nuns from the world. The church was also used daily by the residents of Aalborg, though the nuns were separated from the congregation by iron gates around the choir. The tower of the church was one of the three church towers which can still be seen on Aalborg's city logo.

The church and abbey buildings underwent a significant expansion in the late 15th century and were reconstructed in late Brick Gothic style. In the mid-1520s, Lutheran ideas swept through northern Jutland and Viborg and Aalborg became centres of Lutheran reaction against Roman Catholic institutions, customs and doctrines. The Franciscans were expelled from Aalborg, and support for the nuns vanished.

In 1534 Aalborg was the site of a siege and massacre at the end of Skipper Clement's rebellion. King Christian III's army laid siege to the city and when the walls were stormed, the city was sacked. The city's churches and monasteries, including Vor Frue Kirke, were stripped of anything valuable by the mercenaries who ravaged the city. Two years later Denmark became officially Lutheran and all religious houses and their income properties reverted to the crown. King Christian gave the abbey to the city with the stipulation that the nuns be permitted to remain under the supervision of a local noble.

=== Vor Frue Kirke ===
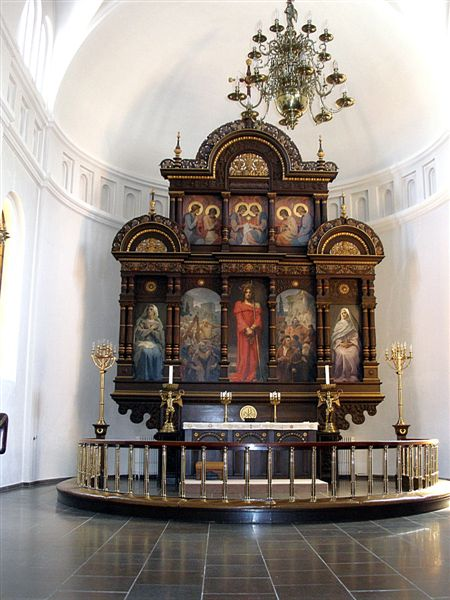
Altar of Vor Frue Kirke

Vor Frue Kirke became one of the city's parish churches. The last nun left the former abbey in 1560 and the town converted one of the ranges into a residence for the new Lutheran pastor. The other ranges were demolished. Several epitaphs were added to the walls of the nave. Burial chapels were added by noble families beneath the church, of which the Scheel family chapel is still extant beneath the present building. A new pulpit, which is still preserved in the present church, was donated before 1579,

In 1876 Vor Frue Kirke had become so dilapidated that it was decided to demolish it and build a new church in its place. It was built of the red brick in neo-romanticism between 1877 and 1878 following drawings by architect Johannes Emil Gnudtzmann (1837–1922) and inaugurated on December 22, 1878. The altarpiece was designed by Gnudtzmann with the altar designed by architect Hermann Baagøe Storck (1839–1922) and paintings by artist Johan Georg Frans Schwartz (1850–1917). Two of the bells in Vor Frue Kirke have been preserved from the earlier building. One of them was cast in the 12th century and is the oldest bell still in use in Denmark. The other from 1518 was recast in 1861 when it cracked, and again in 1919 when it cracked a second time.

== Burials ==
- Jørgen Lunge
