= Martin Lohse =

Danish composer and visual artist

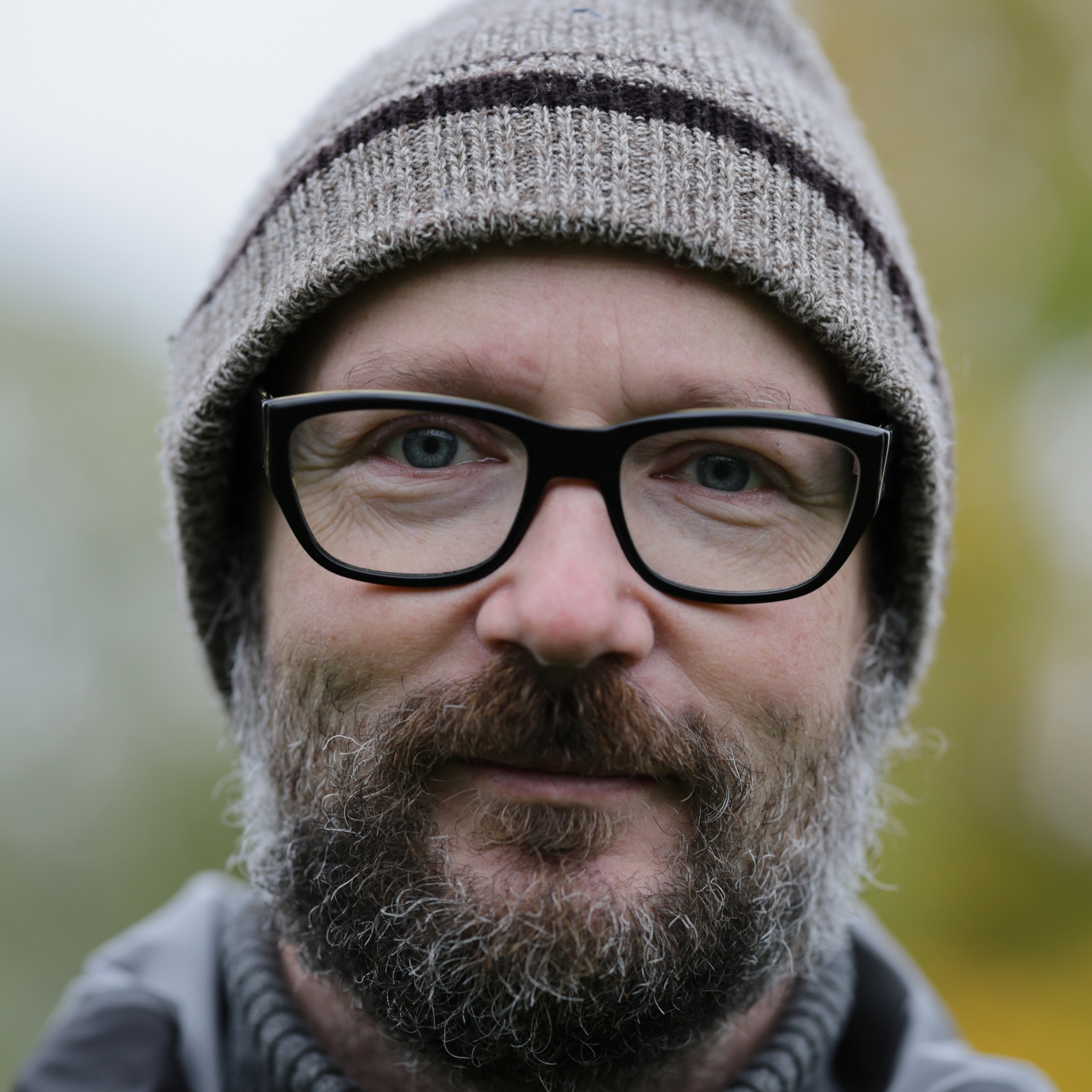
- Frederiksberg 2019

Background information
- Born: 29 May 1971 (age 55); Copenhagen, Denmark
- Genres: classical, experimental
- Occupations: composer, teacher
- Labels: Dacapo Records, Naxos Records
- Website: MartinLohse.com
- Chess career
- Title: ICCF Grandmaster (2009)
- ICCF rating: 2513 (October 2016)
- ICCF peak rating: 2526 (July 2009)

Martin Lohse (born 29 May 1971) is a Danish classical composer and visual artist.

== Biography ==
Martin Lohse was born in Copenhagen, where he began his education at the Musical Science Institute (1990–92) in addition to studies in rhetoric and math (1992–93) as well as geology (1994) at the University of Copenhagen. In 1995 he was admitted to the Royal Danish Academy of Music, Copenhagen, where he studied composition and music theory as a pupil of Hans Abrahamsen and Niels Rosing-Schow. In 2000 he started a postgraduate course in composition and in 2004 he had his debut from the Royal Academy of Music, where he also got a master in music theory in 2005.
Currently he is associate professor in music theory and head of the Music Theory Department at the Royal Danish Academy of Music.

== Music ==
In my music, I try to encircle small musical moments and atmospheres, which can timeless progress and unfold. The collocation and collision of a “pure” and clear music with a disintegrated and multilayered music is one of the main characteristic of my music. In the heart, the music often emanate a harmonic and melodic reminiscence of past experiences in glints or longer periods which combined with a floating sensation (accelerando, decelerando etc.) creates a music with the organic form as one of its main foundations.

— Martin Lohse

Romantic and, to some extent, Baroque music and minimalism are key elements in the music of Martin Lohse. Symphony in one movement, Collage de temps, In liquid... and Smoke all have a reminiscence of the romantic style: Small motives and longer themes within a gliding tonality in a sculptural sound-universe, mixed with a floating sensation of times, sometimes with long and continues accelerandoes or decelerandoes and at other times with tempos slowly departing from each other.

The Baroque style is clear in a piece like Concerto in G, Concerto in tempi and Koncert but it's also a part of works like Collage de temps, In liquid... and Entity.

The music has some polystylist elements, not in the form of big clashes of different styles, but more in the sense of polytonality including polytempoes, f. ex in the work In liquid... for accordion and symphony orchestra, where the accordion in the 1. movement starts slowly together with the piano, but gradually makes a forceful accelerando toward a brilliant baroque figure in a direct collision with the piano, which keeps the slow steady music from the start.

New Simplicity is an essential part of his music, with a direct input from his teacher Hans Abrahamsen, but also evolved with the meeting with Arvo Pärt and his music. It is used to concentrate the music, finding the essence in a motive, a harmonic progression or in a structural complex created by the composer. In works like Moto immoto, Slow movement, Sorrow and 4. movement of In liquid... for accordion and piano the minimalism is transformed or rather reduced to a nearly pure transcendental form.

=== Accordion ===
Martin Lohse has composed several solo-, chamber- and orchestral works dedicated to international renowned accordionists Bjarke Mogensen, Geir Draugsvoll and Hanzhi Wang and his accordion works are played at international accordion competitions, community gatherings and festivals on a regular basis.

=== Mobile ===
A musical technique developed by Martin Lohse in 2009 where he combines the polystylistic elements with a simple repeating sequence of chords, creating a music with both baroque and romantic elements, all in different tempos but with no or very few dissonances.

=== Performances ===
Lohses works have been widely performed. Selected performances:

- Numus Festival in Aarhus (2000 and 2001), Denmark
- Louisiana Museum of Modern Art near Copenhagen
- Danish radio
- Young Nordic Music Festival (UNM) in Oslo (1998) and Reykjavik (2002)
- Composers Biennale 2002, Copenhagen
- Magma, Nordic Music Days (2002)
- Warsaw Autumn (2002) (2004)
- Carnegie Hall 2011 and 2018

== Awards ==
Received the 3-year Grant from the Danish Arts Foundation in 2003 and the Hakon Børresen Award in 2012.

== Works ==
Selected works

=== Orchestral works ===
- Lurid Light W.5 (1998) (symphony orchestra)
- Moto immoto W.35 (2009/2018) (symphony orchestra)
- Symphony in one movement W.58 (2020) (symphony orchestra)

=== Concertos ===
- In liquid... (accordion concerto) W.29b (2008–10) (accordion and symphony orchestra)
- Collage de temps W.41 (2013) (piano and sinfonietta)
- Concerto in G W.51 (2018) (recorder and baroque strings)

=== Vocal works ===
- The Dying Child W.4 (1998) (4-part choir)
- Tree haiku W.7 (1999) (12-part choir)
- Utroligheds frø W.15 (2002) (psalm, 4-part choir)
- The Treads of Man W.16 (2002) (mezzo-soprano solo)

=== Chamber works ===
- For at forfølge det håb... W.1 (1997) (mezzo-soprano and violin)
- Istid W.2 (1997) (clarinet, violin, cello and piano)
- Haiku W.6 (1999) (clarinet, violin, cello and piano)
- Smoke W.8 (2000) (clarinet, violin, cello and piano)
- Koncert W.10 (2001) (clarinet, violin, cello and piano)
- In liquid... W.18 (2003) (violin, and piano)
- Image balancantes W.22a (2004) (clarinet, violin, cello and piano)
- Nocturne W.25 (2007) (piano solo)
- In liquid... W.26 (2003–08) (accordion and piano)
- 8 momenti mobile W.27 (2008) (saxophone quartet)
- Concerto in tempi W.34 (2010) (accordion and piano)
- 5 momenti mobile W.42 (2013) (accordion duo and piano trio)
- Ver W.55 (2019) (guitar duo)

=== Solo works ===
- Passing w.36 (2011-12) (accordion)
- Menuetto W.27b.5 (2008/2014) (accordion)
- Seasons W.47 (2016) (accordion)
- Fast track 49b (2017) (organ)
- Encircled W.52 (2018) (accordion)
- L'eau W.54 (2019) (guitar)

=== Electroacoustic works ===
- Vibration in blue and yellow (2000) (Electronic music)
- Entity W.14a (1999–2002) (solo violin and five delays)
- Slow movement (2004) (Electronic music: orchestra samples)
- Sorrow (2006) (Electronic music: orchestra samples)
- Change ringing W.31 (2009) (clarinet, harp, marimba and electronic music: orchestra samples)
- Wood on strings W.32 (2010) (string quartet and five delays)
- Speed W.33 (2010) (solo marimba and five delays)
- Moto in moto (2010) (Electronic music: orchestra samples)
- The Earth and the Sea W.56 (2019) (solo cello and delays)

== Correspondence chess ==
Awarded the grandmaster title in the International Correspondence Chess Federation in 2009.
Best result is a 3. place in the candidate tournament WCCC28CTO3, where a 1-2. place qualify to the final in the World Championship.

== Bibliography ==
- 2017 Bach Kontrapunkt – Tostemmig invention I and II, ISBN 978-87-87131-02-5 and ISBN 978-87-87131-03-2
- 2019 Bach Counterpoint – Two-part invention I and II, ISBN 978-87-87131-06-3 and ISBN 978-87-87131-07-0
