= Bolette Roed =

Danish recorder player

- Born: 1979 (age 46–47)
- Education: University of Copenhagen; Royal Danish Academy of Music
- Occupation: Musician
- Employer: Royal Danish Academy of Music
- Musical career
- Instrument: Recorder
- Years active: 2004-present

Bolette Roed (born 1979) is a Danish-born recorder player based in Copenhagen.

== Education ==
Roed graduated from the advanced solo performance class of the Royal Danish Academy of Music in Copenhagen in March 2004. Parallel, she studied at the Conservatoire National Superieur Musique et Danse de Lyon and graduated as a medical doctor from the University of Copenhagen in 2011.

She studied the recorder with Dan Laurin and Pierre Hamon, Nikolaj Ronimus and Kirsten Rehling and took masterclasses with Kees Boeke, Pedro Memelsdorff, Peter Holtslag, Marion Verbruggen and Gerd Lünenbürger. Her repertoire ranges from medieval through renaissance and baroque to contemporary music and she has world premiered a large number of works.

== Career ==
Since 2004, Roed has toured as a soloist with the baroque orchestra Arte dei Suonatori and has performed as a soloist with Concerto Copenhagen, the Danish National Chamber Orchestra, the Danish National Symphony Orchestra and the Royal Danish Orchestra. Roed’s career as a recorder player includes being a member of several ensembles such as the Elephant House Quartet, Alpha, Concert Pastoral and Sarbak/Roed Duo. She is also the co-founder of Denmark’s baroque music festival Midsommerbarok in Copenhagen.

Roed is teaching at the Royal Danish Academy of Music since 2009 and is offering regular masterclasses in Poland and the Czech Republic. Soon after her debut, Roed was appointed the Artist-in-Residence of the Danish National Radio and elected for The Danish State Art Council’s “Young Elite” program in 2014.

Recently Roed has developed the canonical recorder repertoire with her 2018 solo album "J.S. Bach: Sonatas, Partitas, Suites" in which she performs the arrangements of Frans Brüggen. Further extending the breadth of the instrument with the 2018 "Johann Sebastian Bach: Goldberg Variations Recomposed by Peter Navarro-Alonso", rethinking the Variations for saxophones, recorder and percussion. The sounds of the instruments meshing wonderfully and creating one of the most distinctive recordings of these J. S. Bach classics. In 2019, the Elephant House Quartet album, Telemann's Garden. The quartet features harpsichordist Allan Rasmussen, violinist Aureliusz Goliński and gambist, Reiko Ichise performing a selection of their own arrangements of G. Ph. Telemann's work.

Her latest recording is a double CD of Concertos by Antonio Vivaldi including but not limited to, the paramount works The Four Seasons (Vivaldi). The album was recorded with Polish Baroque ensemble Arte dei Suonatori and released on Pentatone in early 2021.

== Awards ==
2003 Grand Prize of Jacob Gade Foundation – Won

2009 Nordic Council Music Prize – Nominated with her trio Alpha

2011 Nordic Council Music Prize – Nominated

== Discography ==
Vivaldi's Seasons with Arte dei Suonatori (Pentatone, 2021)

Telemann’s Garden with Elephant House Quartet (Pentatone, 2019)

J. S. Bach Goldberg Variations Recomposed By Peter Navarro-Alonso with Alpha (DaCapo, 2018)

J.S. Bach: Sonatas, Partitas, Suites (Ondine, 2018)

Telemann with Arte dei Suonatori (DUX, 2015)

Royal Recorder Concertos with Arte dei Suonatori (Dacapo, 2013)

Early & Late with Gáman trio (Dacapo, 2013)

Through the Looking Glass with Alpha (Dacapo, 2013)

Alpha World with Alpha (Gateway, 2009)

Alpha with Alpha trio (Dacapo, 2005)

=== Featured on ===
Peter Navarro-Alonso, Le Quattro stagioni with Alpha (Dacapo, 2018)

Rune Glerup, Dust encapsulated with Gáman trio (Dacapo, 2014)

Vagn Holmboe, Solo and Chamber Works for Guitar (Dacapo, 2012)

Narcissus, la nouvelle melancolie, works by Fredrik Österling with Gáman trio (dB Productions Sweden 2011)

Bach harpsichord concertos with Concerto Copenhagen (cpo, 2006)

Hans-Henrik Nordstrøm, Starting Points with James Crabb (Classico, 2005)

A Joker’s Tale with Paradox (BIS, 2005)
