= Marshal of the Realm (Denmark) =

- Rigsmarsk
- Longest serving Claus Rønnow; 1449–1480
- Type: Royal military advisor
- Reports to: the King
- Appointer: the King
- Term length: At His Majesty's pleasure
- Final holder: Johan Christoffer von Kørbitz
- Abolished: 1677

The Marshal of the Realm (Danish: Marsk, from 1536 Rigsmarsk), was the chief advisor to the King on military matters concerning the infantry and cavalry. It was the third highest office in the country after the Steward of the Realm and the Chancellor. The Rigsmarsk was appointed by the king from among Danish-born nobles.

In the beginning the Marsk was one of the king's men and Stig Andersen Hvide used the title Regis Danorum Marscalcus (transl. Marshal of the Danish King) shortly before his conviction in 1287 for the murder of King Eric V. Over the course of the 15th century, the Marsk came to represent the Realm (Privy Council), rather than the King, and in 1536 the title was finally changed to Rigsmarsk or Marscalcus Regni.

After the Scanian War and with the introduction of absolute monarchy the office disappeared. Anders Bille died a Swedish prisoner of war and Axel Urup then served as a Rigsmarsk from 1658 to 1660 but was never formally appointed. After that the title continued to exist for a while as a sort of honorary title but was then abandoned. The function was taken over by generals who had been promoted through the ranks rather than being chosen among nobles.

== List of officeholders ==
List of Marsks and Rigsmarsks.

No.	Portrait	Name (born–died)	Term of office			Ref.
No.	Portrait	Name (born–died)	Took office	Left office	Time in office	Ref.
Marsk
		Claus Rønnow (?–1486)	12 December 1449	1481	31–32 years	
Rigsmarsk
		Eskil Gøye (?–1506)	1489	1502	12–13 years	
		Tyge Krabbe (1474–1541)	1502	1520	17–18 years	
		Otto Krumpen (1473–1569)	1520	1523	2–3 years	
		Tyge Krabbe (1474–1541)	1523	1541	17–18 years	
		Erik Eriksen Banner (1484–1554)	1541	1554	12–13 years	
		Otto Krumpen (1473–1569)	1554	1567	12–13 years	
		Frands Brockenhuus (1518–1569)	1567	14 November 1569 †	1–2 years	
		Josias von Qualen (?–1586)	1569	1573	3–4 years	
		Holger Ottesen Rosenkrantz (1517–1575)	1573	1575 †	1–2 years	
		Peder Gyldenstjerne (1533–1594)	1575	1593	19–20 years	
		Hak Holgersen Ulfstand (1535–1594)	1593	1594	0–1 years	
		Peder Munk (1534–1623)	1596	1608	11–12 years	
		Steen Maltesen Sehested (1553–1611)	1610	22 August 1611 †	0–1 years	
		Jørgen Lunge (1577–1619)	1616	19 August 1619 †	2–3 years	
		Jørgen Skeel (1578–1631)	1627	19 July 1631 †	3–4 years	
		Jørgen Knudsen Urne (1598–1642)	1632	19 February 1642 †	9–10 years	
		Anders Bille (1600–1657)	1642	10 November 1657 †	14–15 years	
		Axel Urup (1601–1671)	1658	1660	1–2 years	
		Johan Christoffer von Kørbitz (1612–1682)	22 November 1660	1677	16–17 years	

== See also ==
- Rentekammeret
