= Swedish intervention in the Thirty Years' War =

Military conflict between 1630 and 1635

Swedish Intervention
- Part of the Thirty Years' War
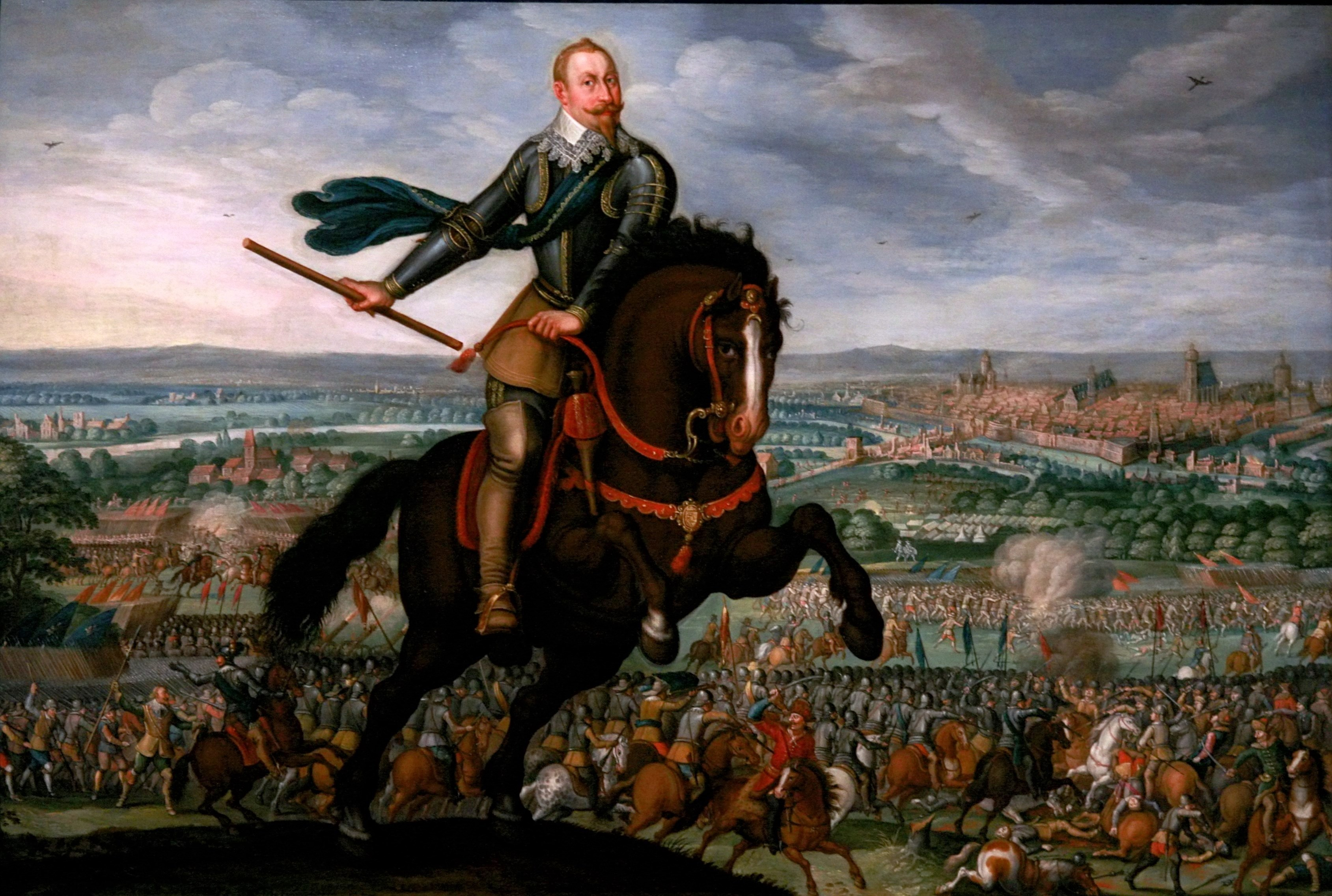
- Gustavus Adolphus at the Battle of Breitenfeld Map of the Swedish intervention (1630-1632)
Date	1630–1635
Location	Germany, Bohemia, Baltic Sea
Result	Peace of Prague

Belligerents
(yes) Swedish Empire; Saxony (from 1631) (Note: John George I abandoned the Swedish cause early on in the war, and joined the Catholics after hearing of Sweden's defeat in the battle of Nördlingen); Heilbronn League (from 1633); Hesse-Kassel; Brandenburg-Prussia; Brunswick-Lüneburg; Magdeburg; Pomerania	(Holy Roman Empire) Habsburg Monarchy (Spain) Spanish Empire; Catholic League (Electorate of Bavaria) Bavaria (Duchy of Lorraine) Lorraine

Commanders and leaders
(Swedish Empire) Gustavus Adolphus †; (Swedish Empire) Axel Oxenstierna; (Swedish Empire) Johan Banér; (Swedish Empire) Lennart Torstenson; (Swedish Empire) Gustav Horn (POW); (Swedish Empire) Bernard of Saxe-Weimar; (Swedish Empire) Dodo zu Knyphausen; (Swedish Empire) Alexander Leslie; (Electorate of Saxony) John George I; (Electorate of Saxony) Hans von Arnim; George William; George of Brunswick; William V; Peter Melander; Christian William (POW); Bogislaw XIV	(Holy Roman Empire) Ferdinand II; (Holy Roman Empire) Ferdinand of Hungary; (Holy Roman Empire) Albrecht von Wallenstein X; (Holy Roman Empire) Count Tilly †; (Holy Roman Empire) Pappenheim †; (Holy Roman Empire) Federico Savelli; (Holy Roman Empire) Torquato Conti; (Spanish Empire) Cardinal-Infante Ferdinand; (Spanish Empire) Count Leganés; (Spain) Duke of Feria; Maximilian I

Strength
1630: 70,600; 13,000 men landing in Germany: 10,000 infantry; 3,000 cavalry; 24,600 men garrisoning Sweden; 33,000 German allies and mercenaries 1632: 140,000; 25,000 Swedes and Finns in Germany ~115,000 German allies and mercenaries	1632: 110,000 pro-Imperial troops in Germany

Casualties and losses
86,300 killed, captured and deserted	80,760 killed, captured and deserted

Swedish intervention in the Thirty Years' War began in July 1630 when troops under Gustavus Adolphus landed in Pomerania. Under his leadership, the Protestant cause, previously on the verge of defeat, won several major victories and changed the direction of the war.

Following the Edict of Restitution by Emperor Ferdinand II on the height of his and the Catholic League's military success in 1629, Protestantism in the Holy Roman Empire was seriously threatened. In July 1630, King Gustav II Adolf of Sweden landed in the Duchy of Pomerania to intervene in favor of the German Protestants. The Swedish armies achieved several victories against their Catholic enemies, including the victory at the Battle of Breitenfeld in 1631. Gustav II Adolf was killed in battle at Lützen, southwest of Leipzig, and two years later the decisive defeat at Nördlingen in 1634 threatened continuing Swedish participation in the war. In consequence, the Emperor made peace with most of his German opponents in the Peace of Prague – essentially revoking the Edict of Restitution – while France directly intervened against him to prevent the Habsburg dynasty from gaining too much power at its eastern border.

Sweden was able to fight on until the Peace of Westphalia in 1648 in which the Emperor was forced to accept the "German liberties" of the Imperial Estates and Sweden obtained Western Pomerania as an Imperial Estate.

== Religious and political background: The Bohemian Revolt ==
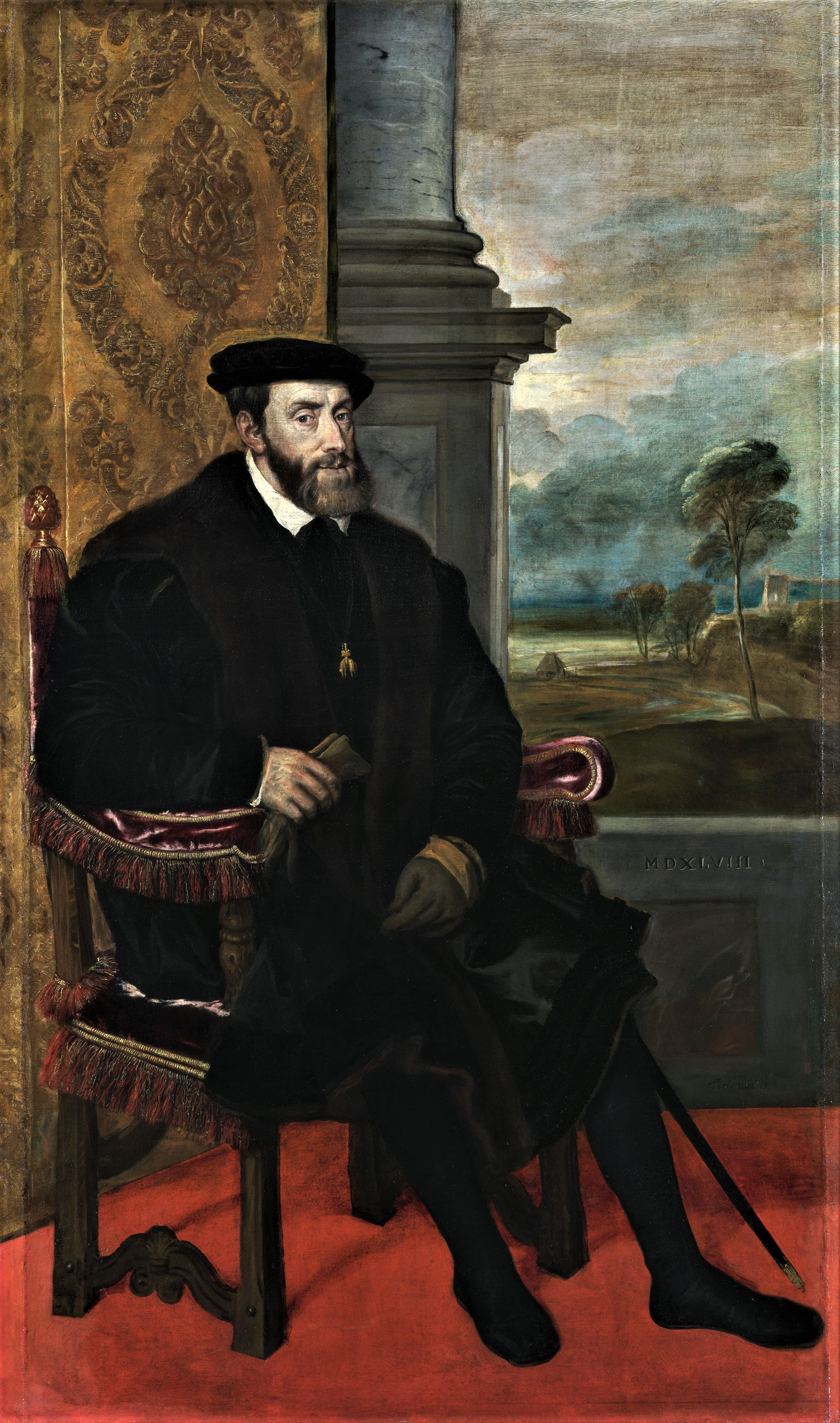
Emperor Charles V sought to crush the budding Protestant ideology with the backing of his vast dominions. He was unable to compel the Lutherans to return to the Catholic faith through force, and was obliged to guarantee that every prince in the Holy Roman Empire was allowed to determine the faith of his fiefdom.

The Thirty Years' War was a religious conflict between Protestants and Catholics in Germany. It originated in the co-mingling of politics and religion that was common in Europe at the time. Its distal causes reside in the previous century, at the political-religious settlement of the Holy Roman Empire known as the Peace of Augsburg. The peace was an agreement between Charles V, Holy Roman Emperor and the Protestant powers of the Holy Roman Empire in the 16th century. It established the legitimacy of Lutheranism in Germany and allowed Dukes and high lords to determine the faith of their fiefdom as well as to expel non-conforming subjects from their territory, the principle known as Cuius regio, eius religio. Additionally, it permitted subjects of a different religion to peaceably move to land where their practices would be recognized and respected. There were also clauses in relation to ecclesiastical lords. When prelates who ruled an ecclesiastical fiefdom converted, the expectation was placed upon them to resign their temporal privileges. Some of these treaty stipulations would be violated on various occasions, as was the case with Gebhard Truchsess von Waldburg, Archbishop-Elector of Cologne. Despite various attempts to violate the provisions in the Peace of Augsburg no general European or German conflagration would erupt as a result of the violations. At the end of the conflicts, it was agreed that the provisions of the Peace of Augsburg would once again be adhered to. "All that the Lutheran church gained by the Peace of Augsburg was toleration; all that the [Roman] church conceded was a sacrifice to necessity, not an offering to justice" says one historian. However, the Peace of Augsburg could never be anything but a temporary cessation of hostilities. Its provisions contained an addendum that declared that it would only become active without reservation upon the meeting of a general council and a final attempt at the reunion of the two confessions. There was no reason to believe these would ever happen unless the Lutherans were forced to do so.

Although genuine ideological differences did drive German Princes to convert, the primary motivation of many was often the acquisition of easy riches and territory at the expense of their defenceless Catholic neighbours and subjects. Princes would convert on the grounds that they would be empowered to seize precious land and property from the Roman Catholic Church, and turn that wealth to their own enrichment.

The Protestants understood and accepted as an article of faith that they would have to unite against the Roman Catholic Church to preserve themselves against Catholic encroachment and eventual Catholic hegemony. However, the Protestants were divided. Lutherans held to articles of faith that were mutually exclusive with the articles espoused by Calvinists. The Roman Catholic Church did everything in its power to sow controversy and intrigue between the two major Protestant factions. As a result, there was no political unity of German Protestant states that could coordinate actions against a Catholic interloper.

It was regularly maintained by both religious parties that the other regularly encroached on the spirit or the letter of the Peace of Augsburg. Indeed, it was understood by Protestants that Catholic officials (especially imperial or church officials) were vicious and jealous of the privileges acquired by the Protestants and would do anything in their power to harm the Protestant cause. It was established by practice that the Pope had the power to relieve members of his flock of the most solemn oaths, and it was a matter of principle among Catholics that faith was never to be kept with heretics. On the other hand, Catholics maintained a similar understanding of the Protestants. The avarice displayed by Protestants for Church property could not fail to go unnoticed by even the most indulgent Catholic observer. With such mutual antipathy prevailing between the Protestants and Catholics of Germany, nothing that could would fail to be misunderstood.

The Holy Roman Empire on the eve of the war's outbreak in 1618. Habsburg-controlled domains: Austrian line Spanish line

The Thirty Years' War arose out of a regional dispute between Bohemian Protestants and their Habsburg monarchs. Rudolf II, Holy Roman Emperor was an obstinate and stubborn monarch. His policies forced him into an increasingly weak position with his heterogenous subjects, his court and his family. Forced to make concessions to his Hungarian subjects in order to appease them for his indecisive war with the Ottoman Empire, Rudolf ceded his Hungarian, Austrian and Moravian holdings to his brother, Matthias. Seeing weakness and discord in the ranks of their German overlords, his Bohemian subjects revolted. In 1609, Rudolf granted them concessions with the Letter of Majesty which included religious tolerance and a church for the Bohemian Estate controlled by the Protestant nobility. When the Protestant estates in Bohemia requested even more liberties, Rudolf sent in an army to quiet them. However, Matthias seized his brother at the request of the Protestant Bohemians, only releasing him once he abdicated his Bohemian crown to Matthias. Rudolf II died a couple of months later in 1612, at which point his brother Matthias acquired the rest of his titles, including that of Holy Roman Emperor.

Being without heirs, in 1617 Matthias had his cousin Ferdinand of Styria elected King of Bohemia, a gesture which amounted to naming him as his successor. They were related through their paternal grandfather Ferdinand I. Ferdinand of Styria, or Ferdinand II as he was to become known, was an ardent follower of Catholicism and the Counter-Reformation and not likely to be as willing to compromise as his two cousins and predecessors on the Bohemian throne were or had been forced to do by circumstance. Ferdinand had not received his Bohemian throne in a weak position, as Mathias or Rudolf had. Matthias had acceded to the Protestants' demands to allow Protestant religious facilities to be constructed on Bohemian crown lands. Ferdinand was to reverse the construction of many of these facilities on his ascension to the Bohemian crown, and when the Bohemian estates protested, he dissolved the Bohemian assembly.

The Third Defenestration of Prague was the immediate trigger for the Thirty Years' War. In May 1618, the three estates of the dissolved Bohemian assembly gathered in Prague, the capital of the Bohemian kingdom. Protestant noblemen led by count Jindřich Matyáš Thurn, recently stripped of his title as castellan of Karlstadt by the Emperor, stormed Prague Castle and seized two imperial governors appointed by Ferdinand, Vilem Slavata of Chlum and Jaroslav Borzita of Martinice, and two imperial secretaries. The noblemen held an illegal trial immediately, found the Imperial officials guilty of violating the Letter of Majesty, and threw them out of a third-floor window of the Bohemian Chancellery, though they survived.

The implications of the event were immediately apparent to both sides, who started to seek support from their allies. The Bohemians were friendless, against a powerful monarch of Europe who had many and powerful allies, and who was a scion of one of the most powerful dynasties in Europe who stood to inherit the entirety of the Emperor's dominions. The Bohemians made offers to the Duke of Savoy, Elector of Saxony (the preferred candidate) and even to the Prince of Transylvania. They also sought admission into the Protestant Union, a coalition of German Protestant states formed to give a politico-military unity to the divided German Protestants. The Elector of Saxony's refusal of the Bohemian crown made the Elector Palatine the most senior Protestant available to the Bohemians. In addition to being a Protestant, albeit a Calvinist, Frederick V was married to Elizabeth Stuart and was thereby a son-in-law of the King of England, indisputably the most powerful Protestant monarch, and whose aid it was not unreasonable to hope for.

However the act of unseating Ferdinand – the legitimately chosen monarch of Bohemia- put the Bohemian revolt in a difficult position with the other political powers of Germany and Europe. John George I of Saxony refused the election, and discouraged the nascent revolt. In September of the same year, the Protestant Union met and called on Frederick not to intervene in the conflict. The Dutch Republic, Charles Emmanuel of Savoy and even the Republic of Venice – a traditional enemy of the Pope – sent letters to Frederick informing him that they would not offer him assistance if he accepted the Bohemian crown – but nonetheless, he did.

== Background in Sweden ==
Gustavus Adolphus had been well informed of the war for some time, but his hands were tied because of the constant enmity of Poland. The Polish royal family, the House of Vasa asserted its right of primogeniture to the Swedish throne – which indeed it had once held. However, when Sigismund III Vasa was elected by the nobles of the Polish–Lithuanian Commonwealth, he was elected on the condition that he be a Roman Catholic. Which he was, as he had a mother who was Roman Catholic and had abandoned the religion of his predecessors, however Lutheranism was the primary religion of Sweden, and had by then established a firm grip on the country. It was not solely the result of religious sentiment that Sweden converted. Notably, one of the reasons that Sweden had so readily embraced it was because converting to Lutheranism allowed the crown to seize all the lands in Sweden that was possessed by the Roman Catholic Church. As a result of this seizure and the money that the crown gained, the crown was greatly empowered. In spite of this, he retained his mother's Roman Catholicism as his religion. Although he guaranteed the rights of this religion to the people in his Swedish domains, this was a subject of great contention for the kingdom. Sigismund's right to the throne became a further subject of contention due to his support for the Counter-Reformation. After Sigismund's defeat in the Battle of Stångebro, the Swedish nobility demanded that he rule Sweden from Sweden. Despite their demands, Sigismund returned to his Polish capital, Warsaw, and was deposed from the Swedish throne in 1599.

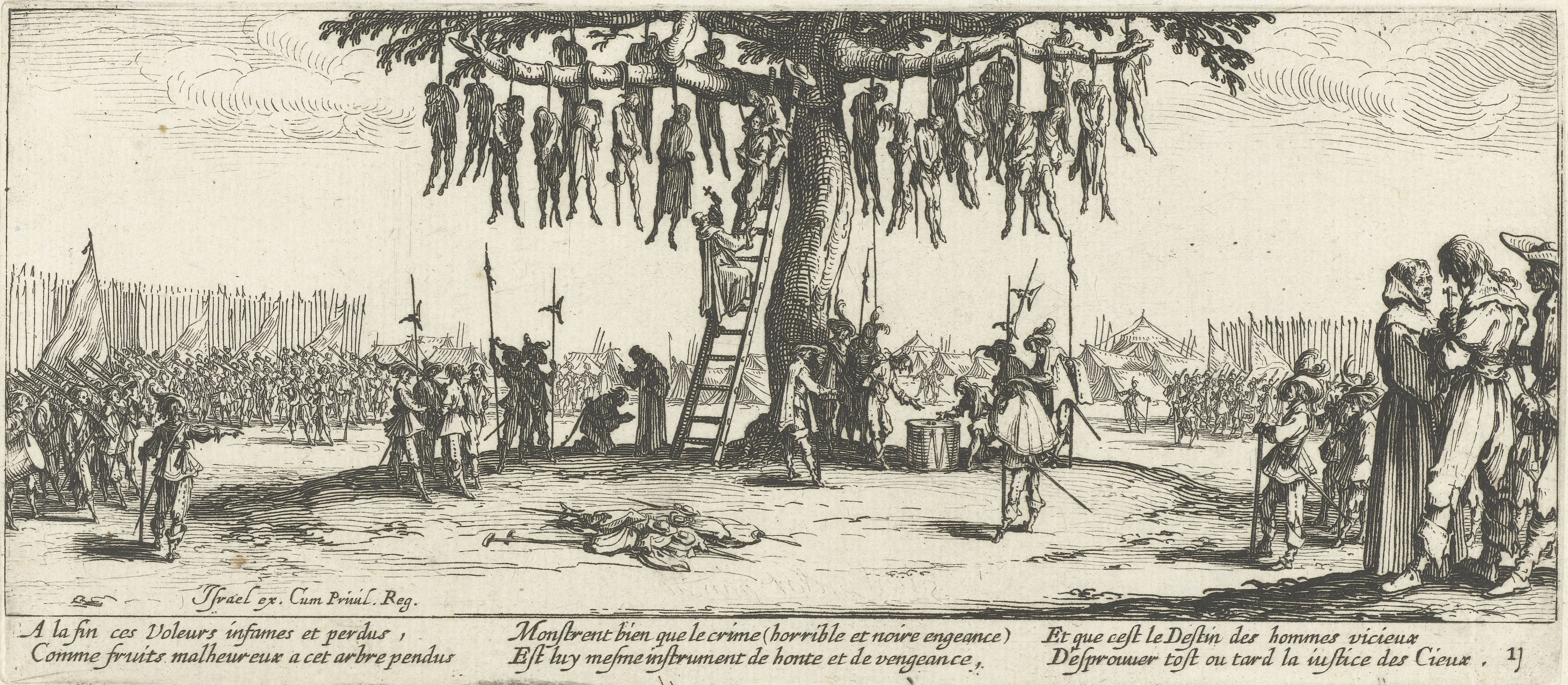
An artistic rendition of the sort of atrocities that were taking place in Germany.

Gustavus Adolphus' father, Charles IX of Sweden – the uncle of Sigisimund – also a Vasa, was awarded the throne, in part because he was an ardent Lutheran. Soon after, Sweden became engaged in wars with the Kingdom of Denmark–Norway and the Tsardom of Russia. Also, Sigismund III never renounced his claim to the Swedish throne, and for many years the primary direction of Poland's foreign policy was directed at reacquiring it. As a result, Sweden was hard pressed on almost all of its borders. Charles IX died in 1611, without achieving any conclusive result in Sweden's wars during the six years of his reign. At the age of just 17, Gustavus was granted a special dispensation to assume the Swedish crown – and thereby inherited his father's conflicts.

Sketch of Europe at the Entrance of Sweden in the Thirty Years' War and the Course of Sweden's Campaign.

The surrounding powers smelled blood, assuming that such a youth could not maintain the gains that the father had won for Sweden. However, Gustavus had first entered the army at the age of 11, and had first-hand knowledge how to govern a kingdom. His training at statecraft had begun at the same age, when later that year his father permitted him to sit in on meetings of the council of state. The neighbouring powers had not assessed the new king accurately.

The new king was able to bring about conclusive results to the conflicts he had inherited. By 1613 Gustavus had compelled the Danes out of the war after landing on Swedish territory only 10 kilometres (6 mi) from the capital. By 1617 he had forced Russia out of the wars and compelled her to cede territory to Sweden.

Gustavus also settled a number of truces with Sigismund – who agreed to them only because of internal strife within Poland. This respite, which lasted 5 years gave Gustavus a free hand to act against the two other powers which had designs on Swedish land. In 1617, he sought to establish a permanent peace with Poland. However, all advances by Sweden for a permanent peace were rejected by Sigismund.

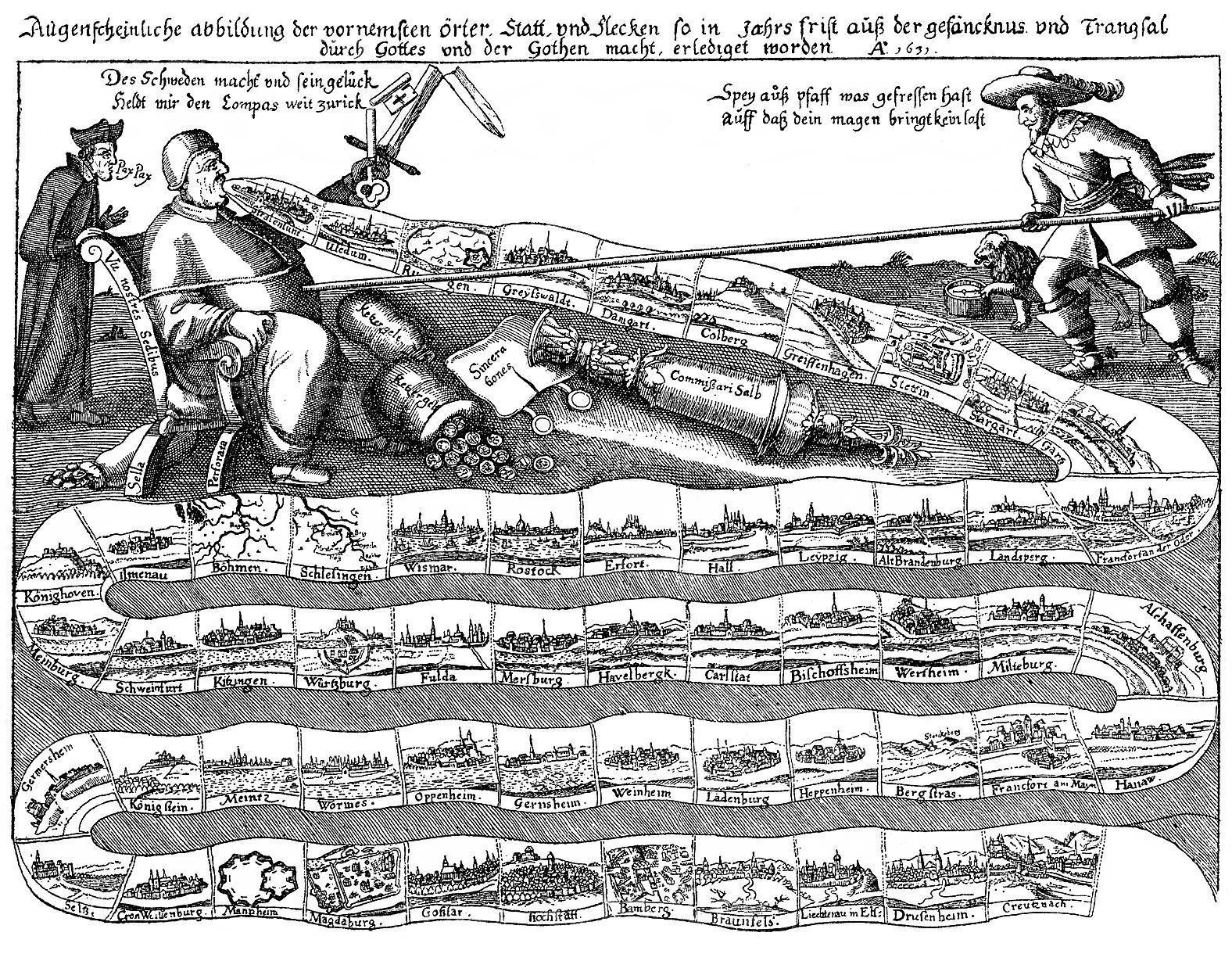
Broadsheets depicting Sweden's taking or relieving many cities

== Swedish military and constitutional reforms ==
This period of peace with Poland benefited Sweden much, and Gustavus employed it advantageously. He established a military system that was to become the envy of Europe. He drew up a new military code. The new improvements to Sweden's military order even pervaded the state by fueling fundamental changes in the economy. The military reforms – among which tight discipline was one of the prevailing principles – brought the Swedish military to the highest levels of military readiness and were to become the standard that European states would strive for. The code drawn up encouraged the highest level of personal frugality. In the camp, no silver or gold were permitted anywhere. The King's tent was not exempted from this prohibition. According to one historian, luxury was a "...stranger in the camp..." All soldiers who were caught looting were to be court-marshalled and then shot, nepotism and other forms of favoritism were unknown in the Swedish army. In addition, the system of magazines (a.k.a. supply depots) was brought up to an efficiency unknown in the period. The baggage of soldiers and officers alike – for the speed of movement – was restricted significantly. Garrison duty was required by everyone alike, there were no exceptions.

Other reforms were introduced as well, a chaplain was attached to every regiment. Prayers were offered up on every occasion before battle. It is related how strange it was to see in Germany, the marshal of high standing in the military establishment kneeling in their religious observations next to the private. Crimes such as thievery, insubordination and cowardice were brought before a tribunal that was overseen by a regimental commander. The last appeal was brought before the king. Provost marshals were introduced and empowered to execute any soldier on the spot who resisted orders. All criminal trials concerning criminality and treason, were required to be tried outside, within the full view of a circle of fellow soldiers.

Decimation was also introduced into regiments that were known to have committed crimes, including fleeing battle. The rest of the regiment was then disgraced by being ordered to perform menial tasks. Violence towards women was punished with death. Prostitutes were absolutely forbidden from camp – especially in the German campaign, as many of them had ties to the German camp as well and divided loyalties could be problematical to Swedish operations. Dueling was forbidden. On one occasion – when two men requested leave to duel – the king attended the duel himself and informed the combatants to fight to the death, and that he had a provost marshal on hand to execute the survivor.

Although many of Sweden's soldiers descended from the ranks of the traditional landed nobility, a new nobility was being established alongside the traditional nobility of the past. The soldier of merit stood in as high standing as any of the Swedish nobles of the day. Sweden was becoming what had not existed since the days of the Romans, a military monarchy. By introducing this new nobility, the monarchy introduced a center of support in contradistinction to the traditional, landed aristocracy, which thereby allowed it to undercut the authority and privilege of the traditionally independent landed nobility. Sweden succeeded at centralizing, against the very same forces that the Polish monarchy would attempt to do so, and fail against.

The severity of discipline was not the only change that took place in the army. Soldiers were to be rewarded for meritorious service. Soldiers who had displayed courage and distinguished themselves in the line of duty were paid generously – in addition to being given pensions. The corps of engineers were the most modern of their age, and in the campaigns in Germany the population repeatedly expressed surprise at the extensive nature of the entrenchment and the elaborate nature of the equipment. There was a special corps of miners, but the entire army was drilled in the construction of entrenched positions and in constructing pontoon bridges. The first establishment of a general staff took place.

Numerous constitutional changes were introduced to the government in order to foster concord and cooperation. A system of social hierarchy was introduced, and given form under the "House of Nobles". The purpose of this organ was to give more rigid structure to the already existing social order, and aid in effective representation of the respective bodies; those being nobles, clergy, burghers and peasants. To exclude vested and powerful interests from exercising undue influence over the government, the nobles were excluded from holding representation in more than one body. Peers were excluded from debating on motions brought before the body – their attendance was mandatory and they were expected to deliberate on motions in silence. Despite watering down the traditional nobility with a healthy leaven of new nobles based on meritorious military service, the nobility had during Gustavus' reign more channels awarded to it through which it could leverage the operation of the government. On the whole though, the king maintained a monopoly on power within the government.

The government refrained from the debilitating but common practice in Europe, Simony, which benefited the state greatly.

It was with this military establishment that the Swedes were to bring about a conclusive end to the wars with Poland as well as land in and have success in Germany.

== Break in the Polish Wars ==
The Swedish royal family had held for some time claims to Livonia – such claims were of dubious legality but were common in Europe. They were constantly employed by monarchs to justify their attempts to acquire more land. Later in the 17th century, Louis XIV of France would establish a series of courts known as the "Chambers of Reunion" to determine which territories that France had possessed earlier – even as far as the Middle Ages – that were "supposed" to belong to it legally. Using a pretext of just this sort, the Swedes invaded Polish held territories. Sigismund was proving incorrigible as long as he did not retain the Swedish throne. Sigismund had much support on the continent for his claim to the Swedish throne. Among those supporters being the Habsburg king of Spain, Philip III of Spain and Ferdinand II were united to him by bonds of marriage. They were also Catholics. Through intermediaries, Sigismund was able to secure a declaration from Philip's government that all Swedish shipping in Spanish ports were legitimate and lawful prizes of the Spanish crown. Additionally, the Swedish crown was avowedly Protestant, and allied with Dutch Republic, which was actively opposed to Spain at the time. With such supporters, and such measures taken in support of Sigismund's claim, it would be difficult indeed to procure a long-term agreement to cease hostilities.

As a result of his inability to bring the Polish king to some sort of arrangement, war between Sweden and Poland broke out again and the Swedish landed near the city of Riga with 158 ships, and proceeded to besiege the city. The city itself was not favorable to the Poles, as they were not Catholic. In addition to this difficulty that the Poles faced, Sigismund's attention was focused on his southern borders, where the Ottoman Empire was making inroads into his kingdom. Embarrassed as he was by this difficulty, he could not relieve the siege taking place. After four weeks, the siege was concluded after the garrison surrendered the city.

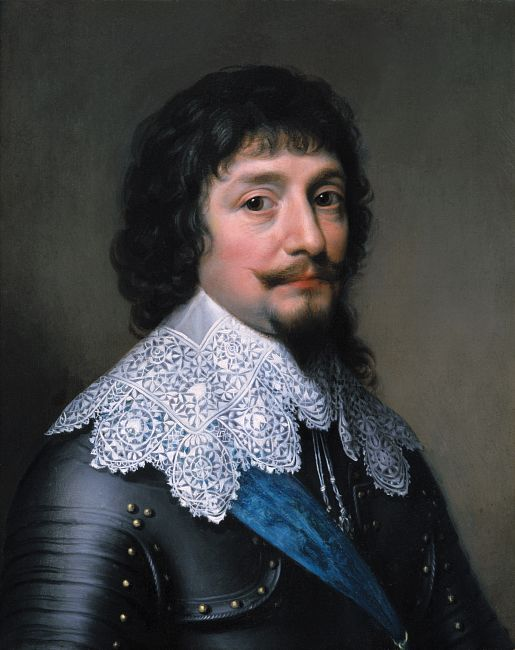
Elector Frederick V of the Palatinate 1610–1623, King of Bohemia 1619–1620, and head of the League of Evangelical Union. He was the son-in-law of the King of England of Scotland. His acceptance of the Bohemian crown against Ferdinand II sparked the Bohemian Revolt.

He started to march into Poland proper – as the Polish-Lithuanian Commonwealth was significantly larger than modern Poland when Sigismund proposed another truce. He did not have the resources necessary to engage in war simultaneously in the northwest and the south of his kingdom.

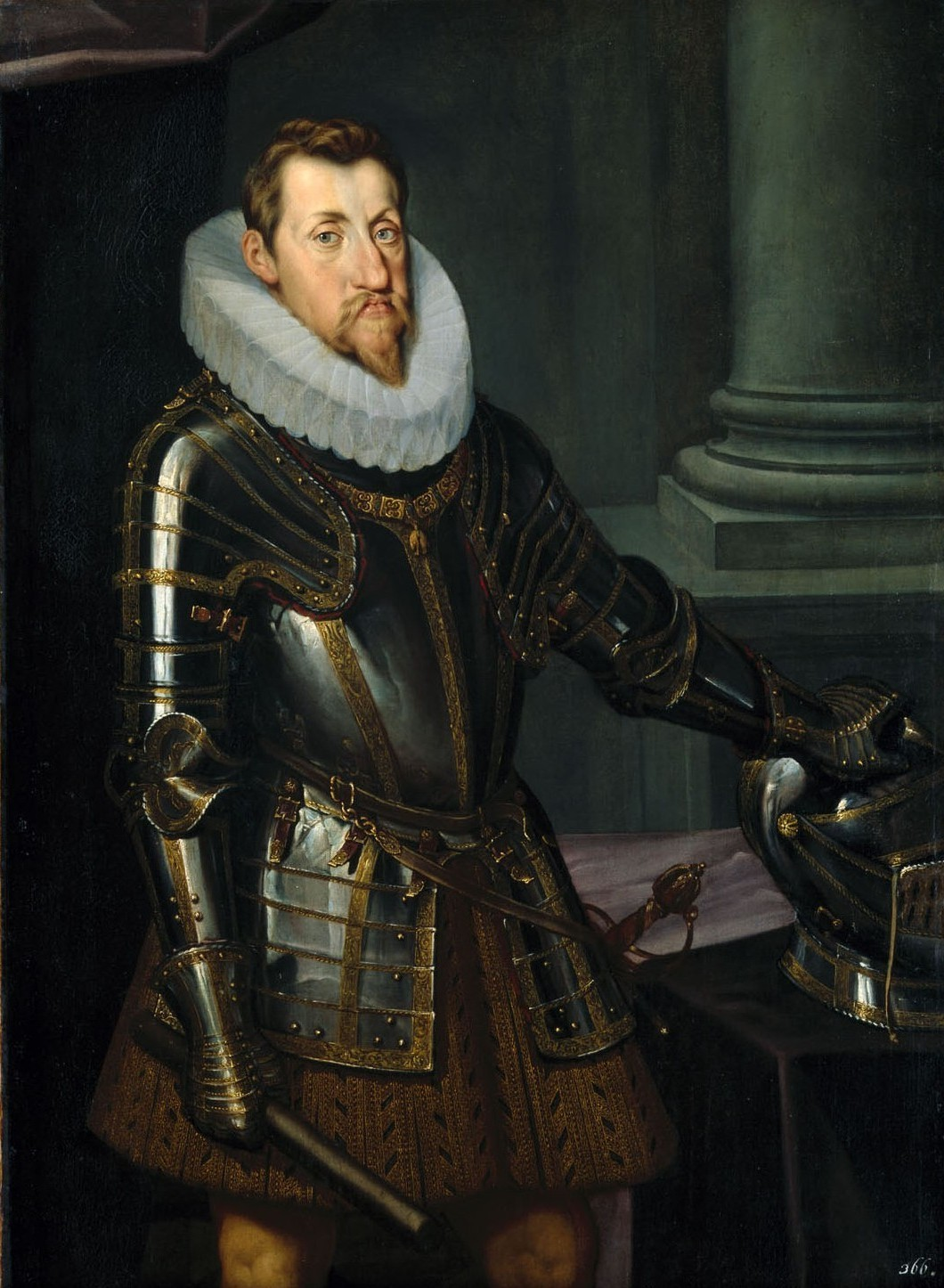
Ferdinand II, was the Holy Roman Emperor from 1619 to 1637. He inherited the 30 years war from his cousin Matthias. He commanded more resources in Germany than any other prince during the 30 years war.

Gustavus could not persuade the Polish king to a permanent peace of any sort, but Sigismund concluded a truce and granted the section of Livonia that the Swedes had already captured as a guarantee of the truce. Accepting these terms, Gustavus returned to Stockholm in the later part of 1621.

Gustavus had as yet no‑one to succeed him in the case of his untimely death, and his brother, the current heir to the Swedish throne, died in early 1622. Sigismund saw an opportunity in this for his claims on the Swedish throne. He had no navy to invade Sweden with, but was eyeing Danzig, a member of the Hanseatic towns. This city was one of the great trading emporiums of the Baltic at the time, and with this city in his power he figured that he could construct a fleet. The Holy Roman Emperor of the time, Ferdinand II, who had the ear of Sigismund and was his brother-in-law, encouraged him in this ambition. The king, perceiving the advantages that Sigismund would thus gain, in June sailed with a fleet to Danzig and compelled the city to pledge itself to neutrality in the conflict between Poland and Sweden. With Danzig's pledge, Sigismund proposed a renewal of the armistice. Extensions of this armistice would be agreed upon over the course of the next three years.

During this peace, which was to last until 1625, the king worked further in reforming Sweden's military establishment, among which a regular army of 80,000 was settled upon, in addition to an equally great force for the National Guard.

During this time, irregular support had been provided by the Protestant (and non-Protestant) powers of Europe (Kingdom of England, the Dutch Republic) for the Protestant cause in Germany. Both Sweden and Denmark sought to receive aid in order to bring a powerful nation into the German conflict proper, but the terms on which Gustavus proposed had some very definite clauses, and as Christian of Denmark effectively underbid him, support was provided to him. The sum of the Danes' effort was although they achieved some initial inroads into Roman Catholic territory, the Catholic League, under the able General Albrecht von Wallenstein (who is reported on one occasion to have told Ferdinand that Gustavus was worse than "the Turk") defeated them at the Battle of Lutter. This resulted in the treaty of Lubeck and the expulsion of any major Protestant combatant from the German theatre. All of Germany was effectively in the hands of the Holy Roman Emperor.

Ferdinand, confident at the turn of events issued the Edict of Restitution. This edict intended to give force to the reservatum ecclesiasticum or the "ecclessiastic reservation" provision to the peace of Augburg. Large portions of land which had been secularized by secular German Lords in the intervening period, but were previously ecclesiastical principalities held by prelates, would thereby revert to former catholic lords/prelates. The Archbishopric of Bremen and the free city of Magdeburg, 12 former or current bishoprics and hundreds of religious holdings in the German states would thereby revert to Catholic control. The edict also allowed for the forcible conversion of Protestants to Catholicism, a direct violation of the Peace of Augsburg.

While no definitive agreement had been brought about with Poland, Gustavus did not contemplate landing in Germany. He wanted to secure his base, Sweden, before he made landing in Germany. He finally settled on bringing the issues with Poland to a conclusion. To this effect, in 1625 he again set sail for Livonia. As Danzig, weak to its trust, had allowed a Polish force to garrison it, Gustavus immediately marched his army towards that city. He besieged it in spite of the fact that and they fought off several efforts to relieve the siege. During this campaign though, the king, wounded on two different occasions, once very severely, was unable to command the army in person. As a result of this, the Swedes suffered some reverses, but nothing materially damaged Sweden's presence. As a result of the king's wounds, the successes of the beginning of this campaign were negligible.

Finally, the king was able to bring a conclusion to the conflict with Poland. In 1628, the king, passing through the Danish sound, a treaty being previously settled that allowed the Swedes the right to do this, landed again. The Emperor sent some forces to support the Poles in their efforts against Gustavus, and it was only at costly results that the Swedes were able to drive this force back and bring a conclusive settlement with Poland. Sigismund agreed to a 5 years truce.

== Preparations for the German landing ==
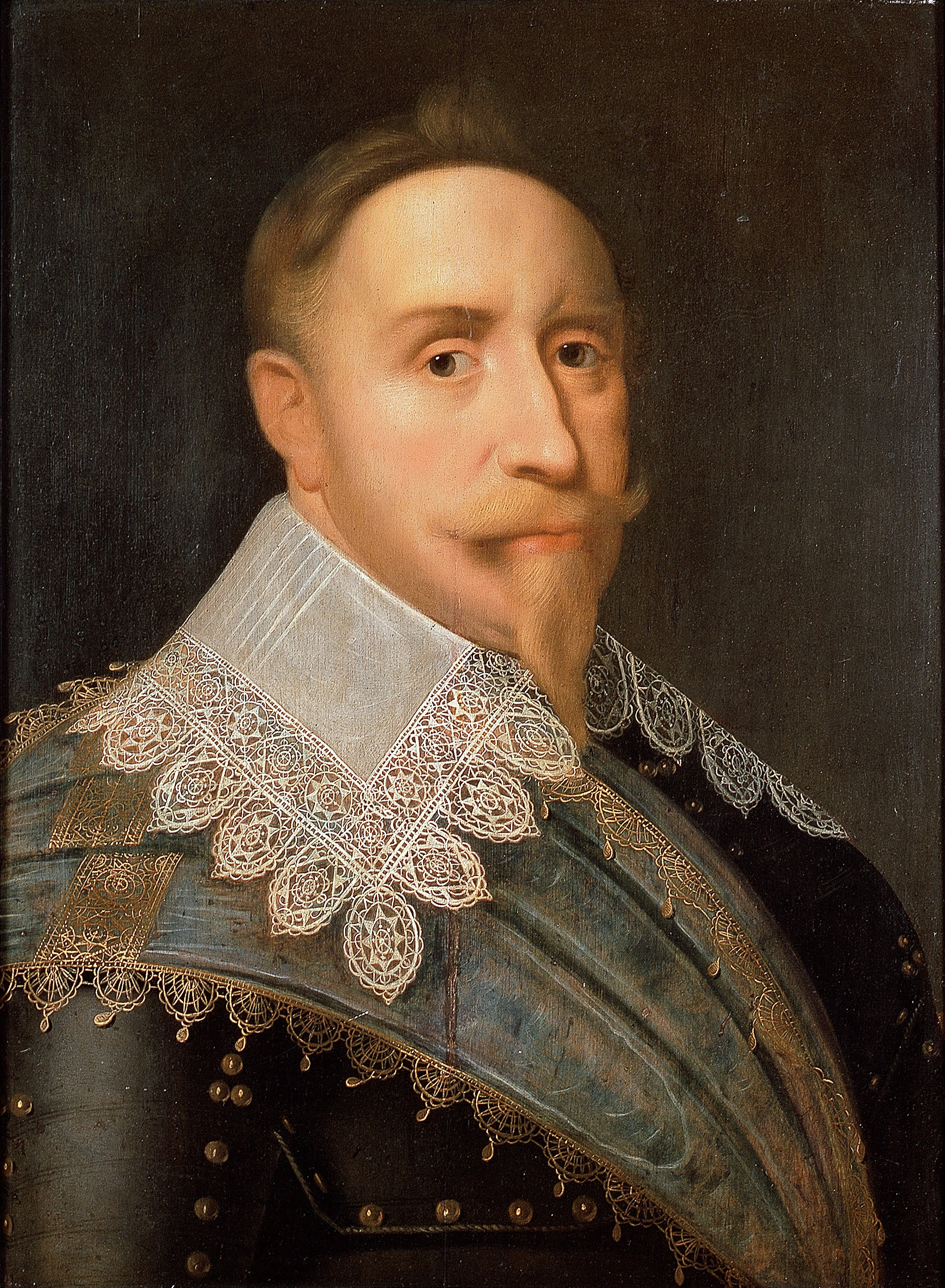
Gustav II Adolf, King of Sweden 1611–1632 a.k.a. "The Snow King". It was on his initiative that Sweden became one of the principal powers of Europe. He is often regarded as one of the great military commanders of all time.

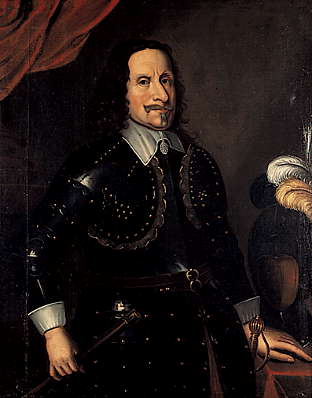
Gustav Horn, educated in military sciences under Maurice of Orange, deemed by many to be the first military innovator of the modern military era. By the age of 35 he was elevated to the rank of field marshal – by the king's own hand on the field of battle. Horn was one of the king's principle lieutenants during the German Invasion.

Although the Protestants had initially had some successes, the Emperor commanded all of Germany with the exception of some of the free towns on the North German coast. Including France at this time, there was no concert of action between the Protestant/Anti-Habsburg alliance. This lack of unity contributed to the failure of the Protestant cause. There were no ardent powers fighting for the Protestant cause, all of them only seeking to empower themselves while simultaneously being willing to come to terms with Ferdinand. France promised subsidies to Denmark, but had provided them irregularly. In addition, the Dutch Republic, although ostensibly equally ardent for the Protestant cause as the French, were not keen on seeing the entirety of the Baltic coast fall into the hands of Sweden for economic reasons; which by Sweden's campaigns against Russia and Poland around the Baltic made that intent on the part of Sweden manifest. Lübeck and Hamburg did nothing more than pledge to exchange silver for Swedish copper.

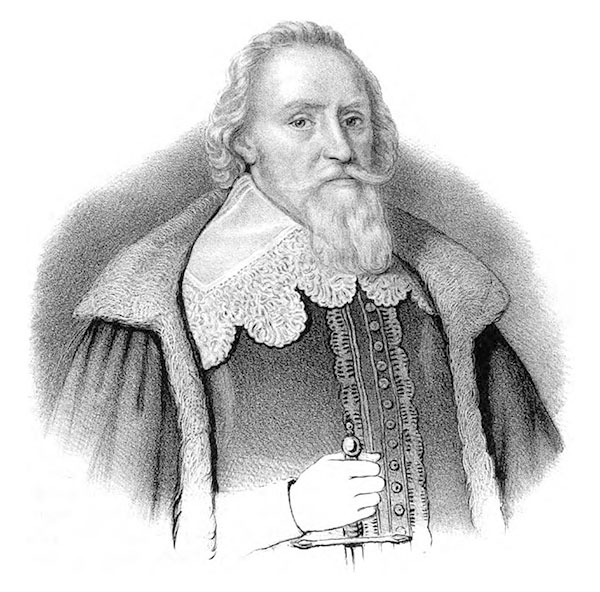
Johan Skytte, baron, senator and governor of various Swedish Imperial possessions in Scandinavia. Skytte was a confidant of Gustavus' father Charles IX of Sweden and served as a tutor to the king prior to his coronation. He was the leader of one of the two political interest groups during Gustavus' reign and often dispatched on diplomatic missions.

Bogislaw XIV, Duke of Pomerania, pledged his assistance as well, but he was desperately isolated. The Margraviate of Baden as well as William of Hesse also pledged their support. However, even once the Swedes were in Germany they expressed a great deal of reluctance and had to be constantly cajoled and browbeaten into contributing their resources to the cause. The only ardent supporters of the Protestant cause were the dukes of Hesse-Kassel and Brunswick-Lüneburg. These evangelical princes held themselves in complete readiness to join hands with the Swedish. Although little favored the Protestant cause at the time, there was unrest in the entirety of Germany as a result of the horrible atrocities that the catholic armies incurred, on Catholic and Protestant states alike. Everyone alike in Germany, as well as elsewhere in Europe – France, always fearful of the Habsburgs – feared Ferdinand II and the increasing resources that he could bring to bear. France was in favor of Swedish intervention, but because France was also Catholic, and Cardinal Richelieu, France's de facto prime minister, did not desire to openly declare against Catholicism, only offered monetary contributions. However, France refused Gustavus' demands for contributions. He demanded a lump sum upfront, and 600,000 Rixdollars (Note: The Reichsthaler / reichsdollar / rix dollar / (Netherlands) rijksdaalder / (Swedish) riksdaler / (Danish) rigsdaler. 1566 Leipzig convention set the reichsthaler as a coin containing 1/9 of a Cologne mark of silver. The Cologne mark was a unit of weight equivalent to 233.8123 g (7 oz 10 dwt 8 275/1000 gr ), so the reichsthaler was 25.97914 g (16 dwt 16 919/1000 gr ).)(or 400,000 talers) per year subsequently.

Although Sweden lacked many qualities that great powers of the era had: in addition to having the best military force of her day, it also had the most efficiently governed monarchy of Europe. Even there however, there were deficits. Sweden's annual revenues only amounted to 12 million rix dollars per year. This situation was ameliorated as the king's reign went on by increasing imposts, and the reversion of lucrative fiefdoms back to the crown on the passage of its holder.

However, several measures were taken to increase the crowns exchequer. Although the crown had been in debt, including the debt taken on to finance wars by the king's predecessors, the king decided to default on all debts which had not been spoken for by the creditors before 1598. The king's father had published an edict in this year which stated all creditors should make their claims on the government known at the risk of forfeiture and proscription. New loans were negotiated from Dutch Republic at the rate of 6 1/2 percent. Domestic loans were negotiated for 10 percent. The government was required to provide security on these loans – for obvious reasons. Mortgages were taken out on the crown estates, and the revenues derived from those estates also. The government also legislated monopolies on certain goods, and either collected profits through conducting industry outright through government agents, or through agents who were prescribed to provide the government with certain returns on their exchanges. Salt, copper and later the grain trade were controlled by the government for these exact ends. On the whole, the system of taxation was aggressive, and caused internal turmoil within the kingdom. Taxation improved, leading to an increase in realized revenues.

In addition to the financial difficulties, there were other difficulties confronting Sweden in its race to become one of the pre‑eminent economic and military powers of Europe. Only a million and a half people were living in the country at the time. As a result of this, as his campaign progressed in Germany, he came to increasingly rely on German mercenaries. Although these German mercenaries were well known for their atrocious conduct towards the local population, under the Swedish military system they were later brought to the Swedish standard of discipline.

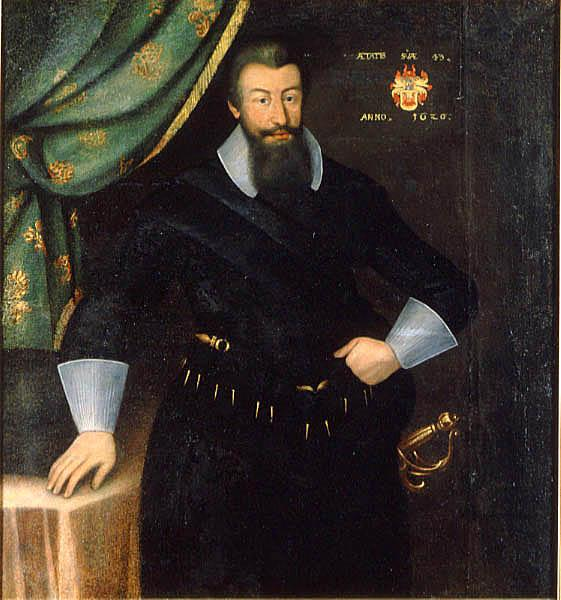
Axel Oxenstierna, successful Swedish diplomat, soldier and Lord Chancellor of Sweden for the entirety of Gustavus reign. He held the appointment of legatus in the Rhineland, with plenipotentiary authority over all German generals and princes in Swedish service. He was the head of on one of the two political parties in Sweden during Gustavus' reign. He was also the head of the Swedish state in the minority of Gustavus' successor.

The king called a convocation of the most eminent men of the state, and after arguing his case before them, it was agreed that Sweden should intervene in the pseudo-religious conflict in Germany. It was his belief that after Ferdinand had settled affairs in Germany to his satisfaction, Sweden would be next on his programme. There were several pretexts for landing in Germany as well. The Habsburgs had actively aided the Poles in their conflict with Sweden – although the two were at peace with each other. In addition to this the conference that had taken place at Lübeck – a conference that had sought to settle the issues that precipitated the war – had dismissed the Swedish envoys – at the behest of Wallenstien – out of hand. When they refused to leave, they were threatened with violence. This angered the king greatly. Lastly the king, as well as the nation, did feel deep concern for the Protestants who were being ruthlessly oppressed. One historian says, "Ferdinand had also insulted the Swedish flag, and intercepted the king's dispatches to Transylvania. He also threw every obstacle in the way of peace between Poland and Sweden, supported the pretensions of Sigismund to the Swedish throne, and denied the right of Gustavus to the title of king.... So many personal motives, supported by important considerations, both of policy and religion, and seconded by pressing invitations from Germany, had their full weight with a prince, who was naturally the more jealous of his royal prerogative the more it was questioned, who was flattered by the glory he hoped to gain as Protector of the oppressed, and passionately loved war as the element of his genius."

Stralsund, a member of the Hanseatic towns, was being hard pressed by the Imperials. This area could not be left to the Catholics without leaving the serious possibility of the Holy Roman Emperor invading Sweden. As long as he was not personally on the scene to prevent such an acquisition, it was only a matter of time that these areas should be seized. The Emperor had 170,000 troops, of various qualities to be sure, in Germany. Such an army could not be prevented from seizing these places with the minimal resources that were at the command of the Protestant holdouts.

Preparations were therefore made between 1629 and 1630. Nitrate (saltpetre) and sulphur were gathered in large qualities in anticipation for the campaign. Factories that produced swords, armor and other weapons were kept at full capacity. A war tax was also implemented, which was specifically aimed at taxing the nobility to ensure that everyone was contributing their part. During this first year, three-quarters of the revenue that was accumulated by the state was to be directed towards the war effort. Even the churches were given instructions to preach in favor of the cause and conscription. All males from the ages of 16 to 60 were called upon to report for service. Those who could not report regular wages were among the first to be incorporated into the ranks. Only families that could report at least one son were required to furnish soldiers. If a family could not report sons, then they were let off from service. No exceptions were granted to nobles – they were required to serve in the cavalry. Men were also incorporated into the army from abroad. There were two regiments of Scots, many soldiers were incorporated into the ranks from the Danish army that had been defeated at the hands of the Habsburgs. Ambitious mercenaries everywhere enlisted in the Swedish army, when the king's military prowess started to become well known throughout Europe. The Hanseatic towns also furnished contingents for the upcoming conflict.

There were also considerable reserves, already encamped in certain parts of eastern Germany. There were 6,000 men distributed between the island of Rügen and the city of Stralsund, both of which were under the command of Leslie – a general who had already proven his ability. Leslie himself had been active in recruiting from the Hanseatic towns. There were stationed in the occupied parts of Prussia and Livonia an additional 12,000 men. These were under the command of Axel Oxenstierna – a man whom held the absolute confidence of the king and was the government's first minister – by the end of the year these forces were brought up to 21,000 men. In order to hold Sweden and its subsidiary states firmly, there were stationed in Sweden itself 16,000 men. In case there should be any contingency that should arise from Finland and the east, 6,500 men were left there. In the Baltic provinces there was a further 5,000 men. Gustavus believed that it was absolutely essential that he should hold the entirety of the Baltic coast, because he would be no good in Germany if the Catholic powers could operate on his lines of communication and threaten his throne. In total, there were 76,000 men enlisted in the Swedish service. Of whom, 13,000 were destined to make the initial landing on German soil. These forces were further reinforced by 2,500 men from Sweden, and 2,800 men from Finland once the landing had taken place. The army consisted of 43,000 Swedes and the rest were recruited from other nations. 3% of the total population of Sweden was therefore designated for the campaign – if the population was divided between males and females evenly – then 8% of the male population was serving in the ranks for the initial campaign – no doubt a heavy burden on the state.

The cost to the Swedish exchequer was in excess of 800,000 rix dollars per year. The king, not knowing of the recalcitrance of his Protestant allies, counted on receiving considerable contributions from them as well once he was on German soil. With the 13,000 men allocated for the German landing, the king had two armies to contend with (one being under Wallenstein and the other being under Tilly) that he assumed to have 100,000 men each. The king was seriously gambling on recruiting more men in Germany. His troops however, were of the highest quality, and once he had gained the confidence of the Protestants by winning battles and seizing important places, he did not doubt that he would receive more.

== The landing: Wollin and Usedom ==
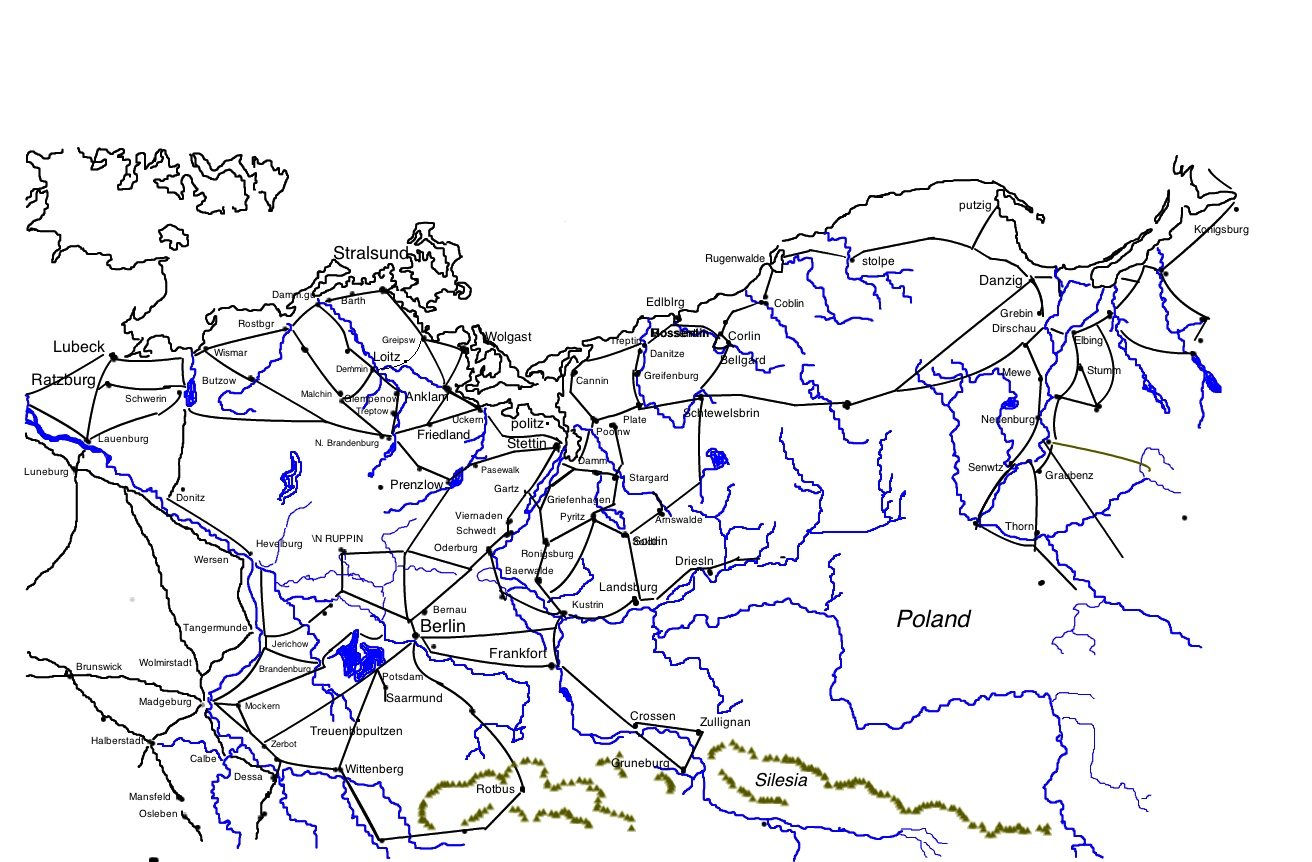
Theatre of war

The king made no formal declaration of war against the Catholic powers. After the attack that had taken place on Stralsund, his ally, he felt that he had sufficient pretext to land without declaring war. He did make attempts to come to an agreement with the Emperor, but these negotiations were not taken seriously by either side.

The capital of Pomerania, Stettin, was being seriously threatened by the Emperor's forces. In order to save the town, the king deemed it essential that he should land here right away. He planned to land there in May 1630, but because the winds were not favorable to sailing out, the Swedes waited three weeks before departing. There were 200 transports and 36 ships employed to guard the armada while it made its landing. The king proposed that he should land his armada at the Oder delta and treat with each of the cities in the vicinity to gain firm grip on the country before making any inroads into the interior of Germany. His plan, once he had established himself, was to march up the Oder.

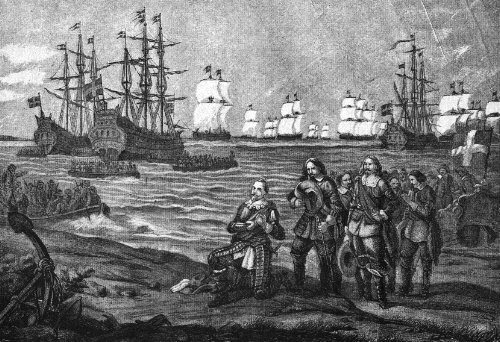
Gustavus Adolphus' landing in Pomerania, near Peenemünde, 1630

The king gathered knowledge of the vicinity in which he was to land. He made himself intimately familiar with it. Despite being Protestant, Bogislaw XIV, Duke of Pomerania, was treating with Ferdinand. Bogislaw was engaging in negotiations with both sides in order to preserve his title to the duchy and the integrity of the duchy itself, as well as its financial viability. His chief concern was to ensure that the depredations that were being visited on much of Germany would not be committed in his duchy. When he learned of Gustavus' intention of landing in Germany, in his duchy, he reached out to the king and requested that the king should not make war in his duchy. The king informed Bogislaw that he was going to land in his duchy, and that upon his conduct depended how the duchy was to be treated. He informed the duke that depending on his conduct, he could count on the Swedish army being lenient towards his duchy or severe in how it was handled.

Three days of public fasting and prayer were declared in order to ensure the success of the landing. The king made the final arrangements for the government of his kingdom. First of all he ensured that his three-year-old daughter, Christina, would be his successor in the event of his death. (Note: Christina, Queen of Sweden would later convert to Catholicism, renouncing the Swedish throne.)

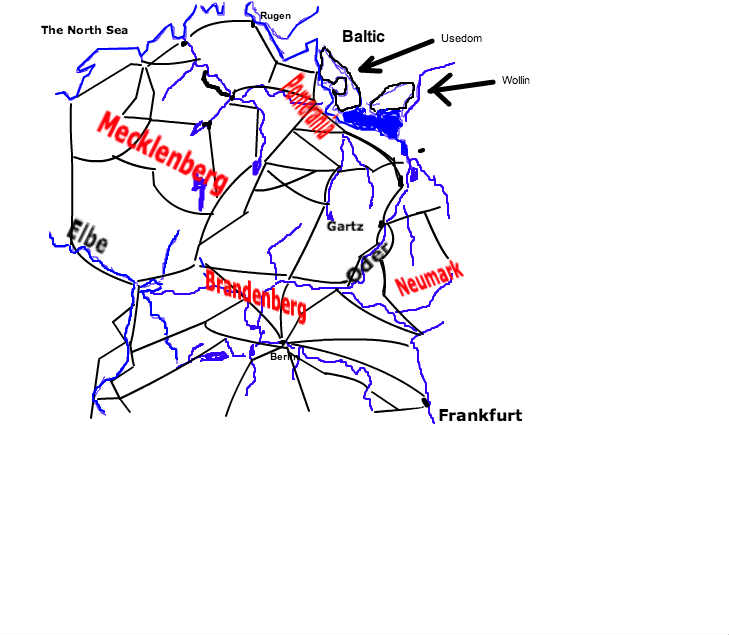
Rivers and duchies of the Oder–Elbe country

The landing transpired on 4 July near Peenemünde on the island of Usedom. He immediately captured a number of the important towns on the island and garrisoned them. Disembarking on the island, the king slipped and fell, but nothing was made of this by the army. The first thing the king did upon landing was kneel and offer up prayers in thanks for the success of the landing. Immediately after offering up these prayers, the king picked up a shovel and started to dig entrenchments that were going to cover the landing. It took two days for the entire force to land, as the companies were landed they were immediately put to work in creating these entrenchments. There were some older entrenchments that were already there, and these were seized as well. Other ones were also constructed.

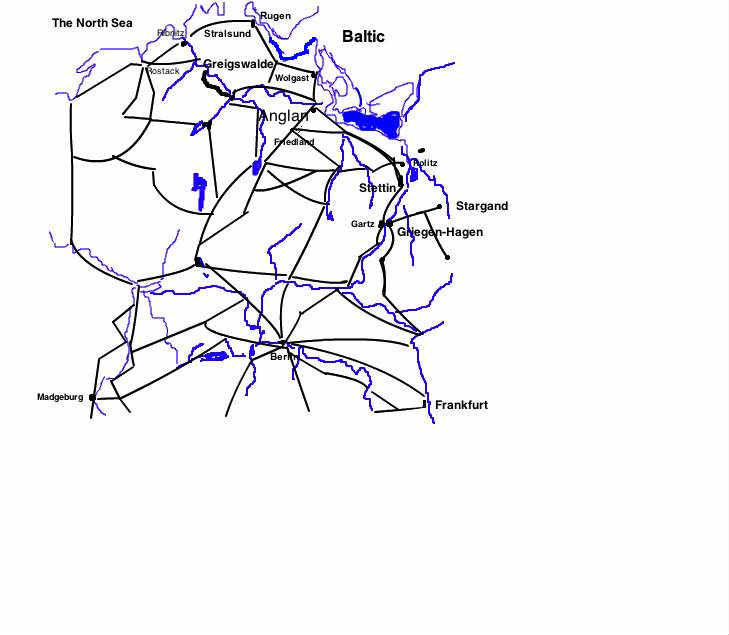
Germany with principal cities for campaign

Since it had taken so long for the armada to disembark, the stores of food that had been designated for the army upon landing had been largely consumed by the army. Orders were issued that food should be gotten from Stralsund, but even these were not enough. The king, angered by this lack of victual, held Johan Skytte (previously the king's tutor), the officer who had been in charge of ensuring the supply of food to task for this and lectured him severely. He sent to Oxenstierna and ordered him to hurry up supplies from Prussia. Feeling confident that he had secured his landing, by the end of the month, the king sent to Oxenstierna a small portion of his fleet to gather supplies and bring them to his position at the delta of the Oder.

After two days, the king took 1,200 musketeers and a force of cavalry with him. He moved this force to the region opposite Wolgast (a town that was on the continent proper opposite Usedom). Seeing that the Imperials had constructed a fortress to protect the region he reconnoitered the fortress, observing its strengths and weaknesses. He sent back to his principal base and ordered that 4,000 additional musketeers be brought up to the position. When these came up, he moved towards the fortress but found that the Imperials had abandoned the base and moved to Wolgast. He left 1,000 men in this base and with the rest of the force, 3,500 foot soldiers and 2,500 cavalry, he set out to clear Usedom of Imperial forces entirely. There were a number of bases opposite Usedom on Wolin, which Imperials retreated to as the king made his push to clear the island. He ordered that his forces garrison these bases and continued to pursue the Imperials to the far side of the island. There was no resistance on the island, as the Imperialists continued to retreat. Seeing that they would soon be pinched between the inlet that separated Wolin from the mainland, the Imperials burnt the bridge that crossed from Wolin to the mainland and continued their retreat. The king had secured both Wolin and Usedom – as the result of which he controlled all of the mouths that the Oder had into the Baltic Sea, he went back to his headquarters.

== Securing Pomerania ==
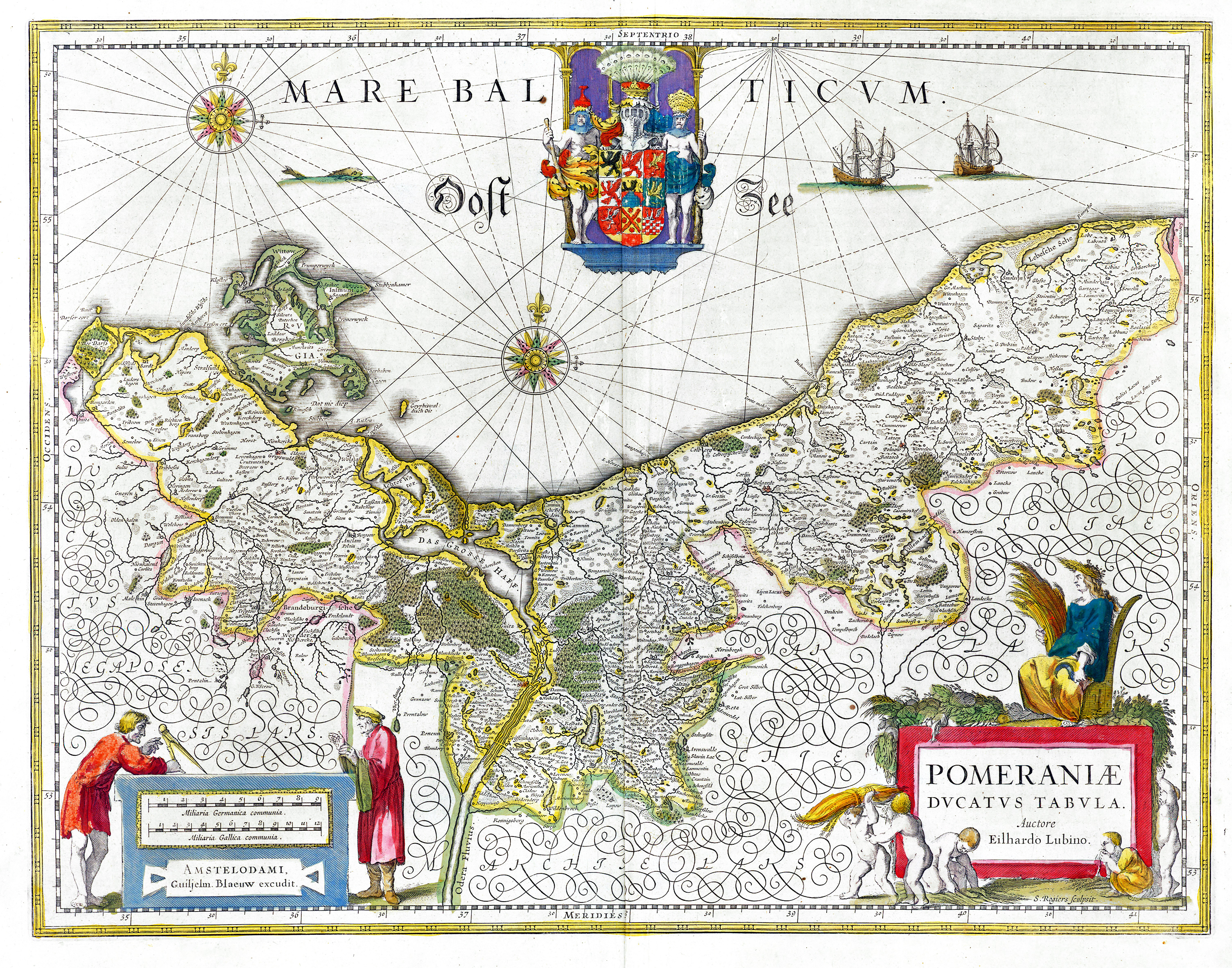
The Duchy of Pomerania before its incorporation into Sweden in 1637

Stettin was the capital of Pomerania, and one of the reasons that it was selected as the capital was because it was centrally located in the duchy. The duchy itself was divided roughly in two by the Oder. It had been under siege by the Imperials for some time but the Imperials – as was common for sieges at the time – had not made significant progress in taking the city. Generals of the time deemed sieges to be difficult and ill-advised. To this effect, Stettin was still in the hands of Bogislaw – having held out against many vigorous assaults. Learning of Gustavus' landing however, the Imperial generals retreated (Savelli southeast of Stralsund further north on the Oder) from the Swedes. Savelli retreated to Anklam and Conti retreated to Gartz and Greifenhagen (holding both banks of the Oder). Gustavus left Colonel Leslie in command of Wollin and General Kagg on Usedom. Both of them were left under the command of General Knyphausen. He took provisions to ensure that these islands would be secure from landings by the Imperials.

The king drew in the 5,000 soldiers that he had garrisoned in Stralsund and assembled the rest of his forces and brought them up to a total of 74 companies. By 18 July, he had assembled this force and the next day he set out from the Swine Inlet to Stettin. He was squarely between Savelli and Conti, and once he was able to acquire the city, he would have established himself on interior lines.

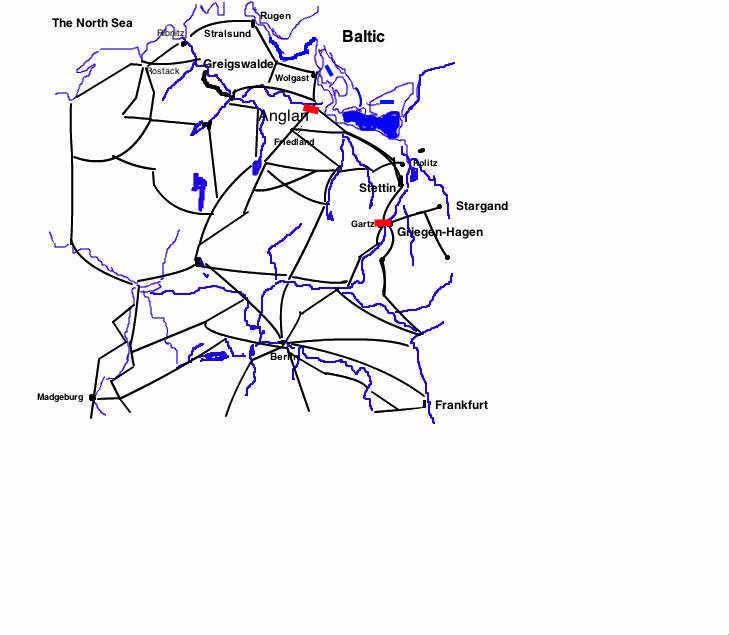
Dispositions of Imperial armies. Stettin is situated between the two cities the catholic powers had retreated to. By taking this city, the Swedes would gain an important advantage

This is important because he would have a shorter period of time to bring his troops to any given point, and would therefore be able to reinforce any position that was threatened more quickly than the Imperials if they should attack a sector that he had taken. In addition, he would be able to apply pressure to any point in the Imperial line more quickly than the Imperials themselves could apply to his line. This was especially important because at the present he did not have as large of a force as the Imperials did. By having this position he would be able to march his troops between both his lines as necessity required.

In spite of his city being harassed by the Imperials, Bogislaw was focused on maintaining his neutrality in the conflict. Colonel Damitz, who was in charge of the defense of the city, had received orders not to admit the Swedes into the city. If necessary, the duke ordered him to attack the Swedes. A drummer was sent to treat with the king; however, the king did not receive the ambassador, stating that he did not recognize messages that came from soldiers of such low grade, and that he would only speak with Damitz himself. Some talks took place between the king and the colonel; however the colonel had not been empowered to allow troops to enter the city. The king and the duke quickly made arrangements to speak, and at the meeting the king informed the Duke that he would not brook neutrality from any power in Germany, and that he was fully prepared to take the city by force. He was also informed by the king that the Swedes would not tolerate delay of any sort, that he must be allowed to enter the city at once.

On 20 July, after having persuaded Bogislaw that he should be allowed to enter the city (up to this point, there had not been a single Swedish casualty), the Swedes marched into the city. A treaty was concluded between the two powers, which effectively stripped Pomerania of its sovereignty, and other matters of the city and duchy were settled to the king's satisfaction. The king then received contributions from the duke and swapped out Damitz' force and placed three of his own companies to garrison the city. Bogislaw sent an embassy to the Emperor, informing him of the situation that had just transpired, but the Emperor declared that the entirety of Pomerania was in revolt, and looting and pillaging in the country was permitted on an even more extensive scale.

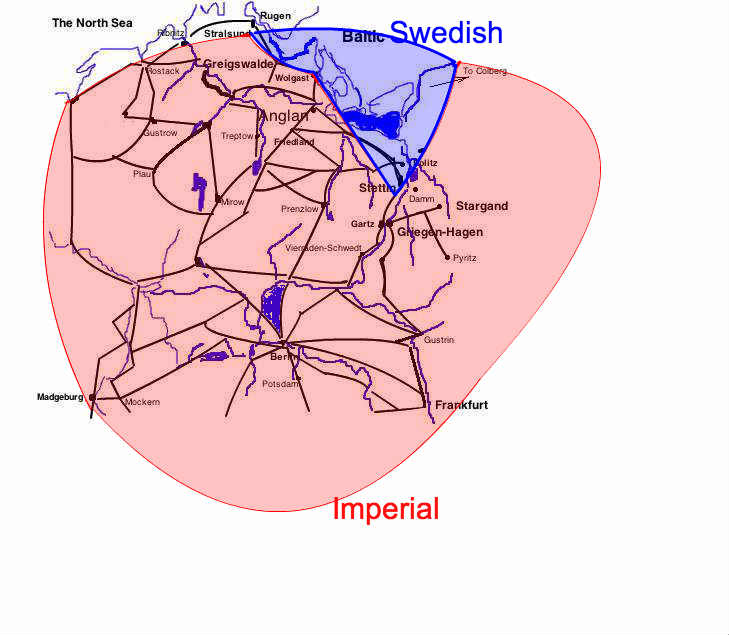
Swedish and Imperial possessions after the Swedish capture of Stettin

Shortly thereafter, the king received additional reinforcements from Prussia. So bad were the conditions prevailing in Germany at the time, many other men voluntarily enlisted into the Swedish ranks for food. With the acquisitions the Swedes had made, they were now up to 25,000 soldiers. Although there was much support for the Swedes in the German countryside, there was also significant enmity to the Swedish cause. During this time there multiple attempts made to assassinate the king by Catholic enthusiasts.

The king then ordered that the defenses to Stettin be improved. All of the people of the city as well as villagers were rounded up and the defensive works were quickly completed.

Despite the advantageous position that the Swedes had acquired, they were still vulnerable. At Wolgast, opposite Usedom, there was an Imperial force preparing to attack the Swedish on Usedom. In addition, there were Imperial camps established at both Garz and Griegenhagen, they also still held Damm – opposite of Stettin – and as long as this city was in Imperial hands the possession of Stettin was not an established fact. On 22 July, the king ordered a squadron to capture this city. After taking it, the king ordered Damitz – the colonel of Bogislaw – to take Stargard. This city was taken, and shortly after Treptow and Greifenberg were also taken. A number of other cities were taken in order to ensure that the Imperial force that was at Kolberg could not join their comrades via Greifenhagen and Garz. The king was careful to garrison these cities to ensure that the Imperials at Kolberg should not punch through his line and join their comrades. The king's next objective was Garz, and one day while observing the area an Imperial patrol came across him and his guard and they were captured. Not knowing who he was though, they did not take due precautions, and his main guard quickly attacked and saved the king. The king was so reckless about his own personal security that this happened on two different occasions during the course of his career.

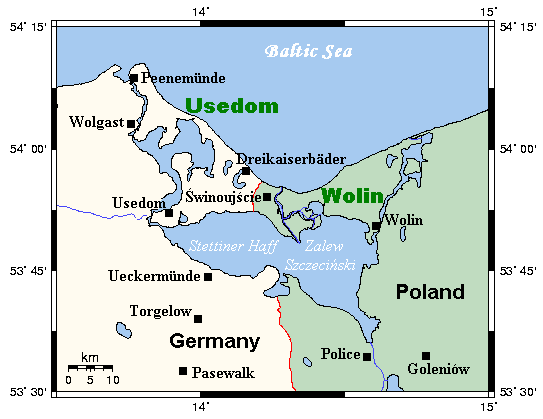
The neighborhood that was being campaigned in at the time. Including Ueckermünde

The next city on his programme was Anklam. Savelli had stationed himself there upon the Swedish landing. The city was on the opposite side of Usedom, and although there were no bridges between it and Usedom, it still posed a significant threat. it would easily serve as a place from which the Imperials could cross onto Usedom. However, the Imperials retreated from this city too, so confused was the king by this that he warned the general whom he had detailed to take the place, Kagg, that he should be on the alert for a rouse of some kind. Kagg took the city and fortified it without incident.

Ueckermünde and Barth (to the west of Stralsund) were also taken without incident. Wolgast was besieged, and although the garrison gave up the city to the Swedes they held out in the citadel of the city. This garrison hung onto the citadel until 16 August. Treptow was also taken.

The king did not only desire to tighten his grip in the area he had landed in, but he also wanted to join hands with Oxenstierna. Oxenstierna had a large force on hand in Prussia which the king wanted to bring into the conflict in Germany (Prussia, being a fief of Poland at the time). The king instructed Oxenstierna to order an "able officer" to Stolpe, but establishing a connection with Prussia and Oxenstierna would have to wait. Despite his good position, being in between the Imperials as he was, his army was spread out in three separate bodies that could not support each other except by sea; under the king was the force stationed at Oderberg and Stettin; Kagg's force was based on Usedom (a sort of "link in the chain"); and Knyphausen's force that was based on Stralsund. It was critical that before he advance into the interior, or that Oxenstierna should join him, he should be able to act in concert with all of these bodies and move them about at will so they could support each other without encountering the enemy en route. One of the features that makes him the first "modern general" is his scrupulous care for his communications and his operating under the principle that his army should be united, or each unit having the ability to join the other units, in good time. Holding Anklam was not enough to ensure that the body based on Stralsund could quickly join his army at Oderburg should matters become problematical. The line from Stralsund to Anklam down to Stettin could be punctured at any point. The river Tollense (immediately west of Anklam) ran roughly parallel to this irregular line that he had garrisoned. To hold his gains on the coast secure, he must have this river as to prevent the Imperials-based out of Mecklenburg from cutting his line. To change this situation, the king ordered Knyphausen to move his army forward in a southwesterly direction towards the Tollense, and Kagg was to follow Knyphausen's movement and simultaneously ensure that Knyphausen's force was not attacked on its northern flank. As the line was spread out as it was, with a somewhat weighted right flank, it would ensure that the Imperials could not support each other, as the original units would be forced to hold their position or risk losing their positions in their attempt to save another fortified place.

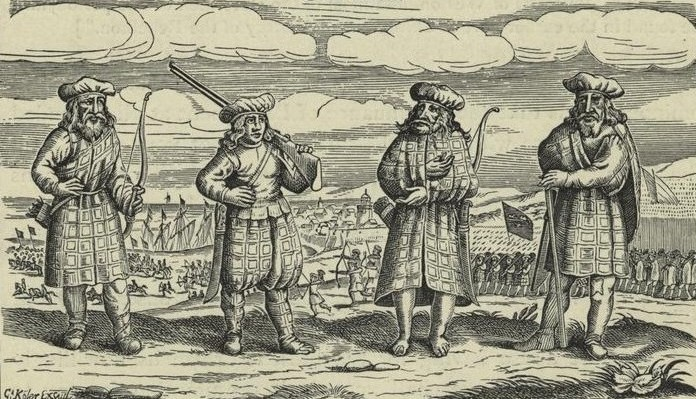
Scottish soldiers, identified as Donald Mackay Lord Reay's regiment, in service of Gustavus Adolphus, 1630–31

Savelli was still at Greifswald, and when he learned of the occupation by a small Swedish unit at Klempenow, he sent a small detachment to observe it. Upon learning that Wolgast had fallen, sensing that he was being surrounded, he marched his army by way of Demmin on to Klempenow. As there were only 100 men stationed in the city, it fell. Only one officer and six men surrendered. Seeking to tighten his grip on the Tollense region, as having been driven out of Greifswald, it was effectively his new line; he garrisoned Klempenow, Loitz and Demmin. He also garrisoned Neubrandenburg, Treptow and Friedland. He ordered Pasewalk taken, a small town outside of Stralsund, and despite fierce fighting the place was taken and the town was burned to the ground.

Meanwhile, stationed at Pasua and Elbing (to the far east), Oxenstierna was seeking to move towards the king. The cities that were critical to establishing a land route between the two armies was Kolberg (occupied by the Imperials) and Cammin. Knyphausen and Oxenstierna were entrusted with the task of establishing a land route between Prussia and Swedish occupied Pomerania. Meanwhile, being August as it was, the king was contemplating the establishment of winter quarters. However, the Administrator of Magdeburg, Christian William declared in favor of the Swedish, drove out the Imperial garrison and called the Swedes to aid the city. This was done without the king's prior knowledge, and there were many objects which the king deemed to be of higher importance than the city of Magdeburg. It is not likely the king would have encouraged such a move if he had been consulted about it. The king still wanted to march to the Elbe, take possession of the duchy of Mecklenburg and engage in negotiations with Hamburg and Lübeck. Magdeburg was much too far away, and there were large contingents of Imperial troops between the Swedish army and Magdeburg. However, the king sent a colonel, Dietrich von Falkenberg, to the city and ordered him to bring the city into the highest level of defense for an anticipated siege by the Imperials.

This put the king in a difficult position. If he left Magdeburg to its fate, then he would be seen by the Protestant powers of Germany as being unreliable and being unable to support his allies. They were already reluctant enough to support the Swedish and provide manpower and material. If he was seen in this light by the Protestant powers, then they would be even more inclined to withhold their support.

== Mecklenburg ==
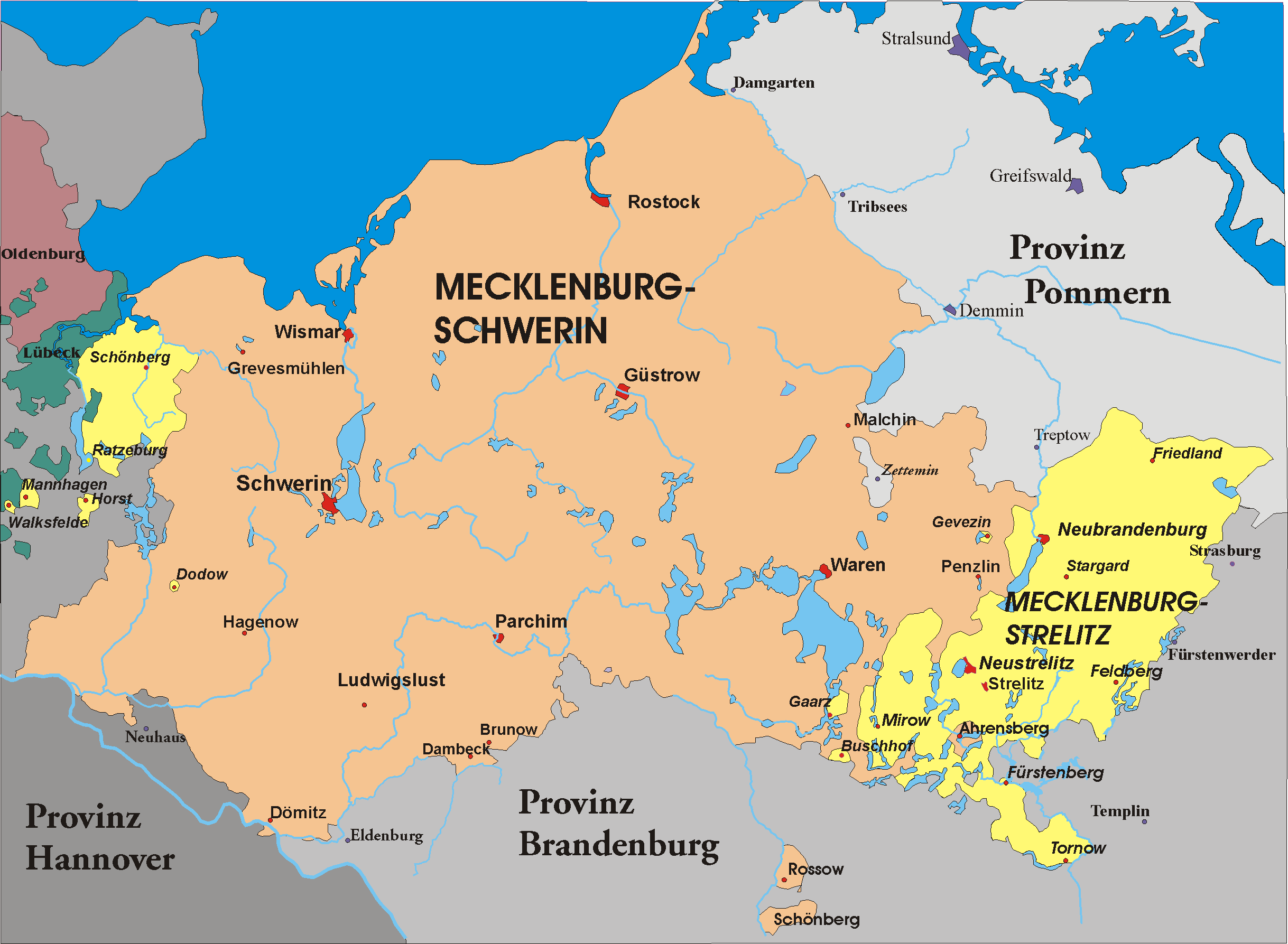
Duchy of Mecklenburg. Also featured is Lübeck

By September 1630, King Gustavus was confident that he had secured himself on the coast of Germany. Desiring to reach out west, he had a number of reasons for doing so: he wanted to restore his cousins to their duchies in Mecklenburg (whose territories had been taken from them by Ferdinand and given to Wallenstein for his services); to establish a firm connection with the duke of Hesse-Kassel, who was the only prince at the time that had provided support to the Swedish – he was essentially the only wholehearted ally that he had in Germany;, to reach Magdeburg (if at all possible); reach out to the duke of Saxe-Lauenburg who had assured him that he would be received warmly (only if he reached his duchy); and to establish contact with Lübeck and Hamburg. Although this route, with Magdeburg in mind, was indirect, it was the only route he could take without passing through Electorate of Saxony and the Electorate of Brandenburg (which was also in the hands of the same family that possessed Prussia). These princes, desiring to maintain the integrity of their dominions and their ostensible neutrality (the Imperials had forced them to allow armies to march through their territories on several occasions, and would do so again) did not want armies, especially Imperial armies, marching through their territories and causing destruction in their lands. These two German powers were also Protestant. They were awaiting events to see who would gain the upper hand, and they too were duplicitous in their dealings with both sides. Both of their princes were just as suspicious of the Swedes as they were of the Imperials. They were both powerful German states, and could not be ridden over roughshod the way Pomerania had been. The king was accordingly more cautious in his dealings with them and courted them with the desire of attaining an alliance with them.

With Magdeburg in particular in the back of his mind, in order to move towards his potential and actual allies, without invading Saxony and Brandenburg, the king saw that Wismar and Rostock would be necessary to take. Wismar was especially important because it allowed him to incorporate more of the Baltic sea within his control, and would allow him to exclude inimical fleets from the Baltic by preventing them from having a place to land to resupply. Gustavus Horn had brought reinforcements from Finland and Livonia. He left these reserves, as well as the majority of the army stationed at Stettin, under Horn. The king issued him orders that he was to hold the place securely, he assigned him the task of taking Greifswald before the spring and to hold on to the road between Stralsund and Stettin. If the Imperials were to march on him directly with a numerically superior force, he was to abandon the project of Greifswald and protect the Stettin–Stralsund line and march towards the king.

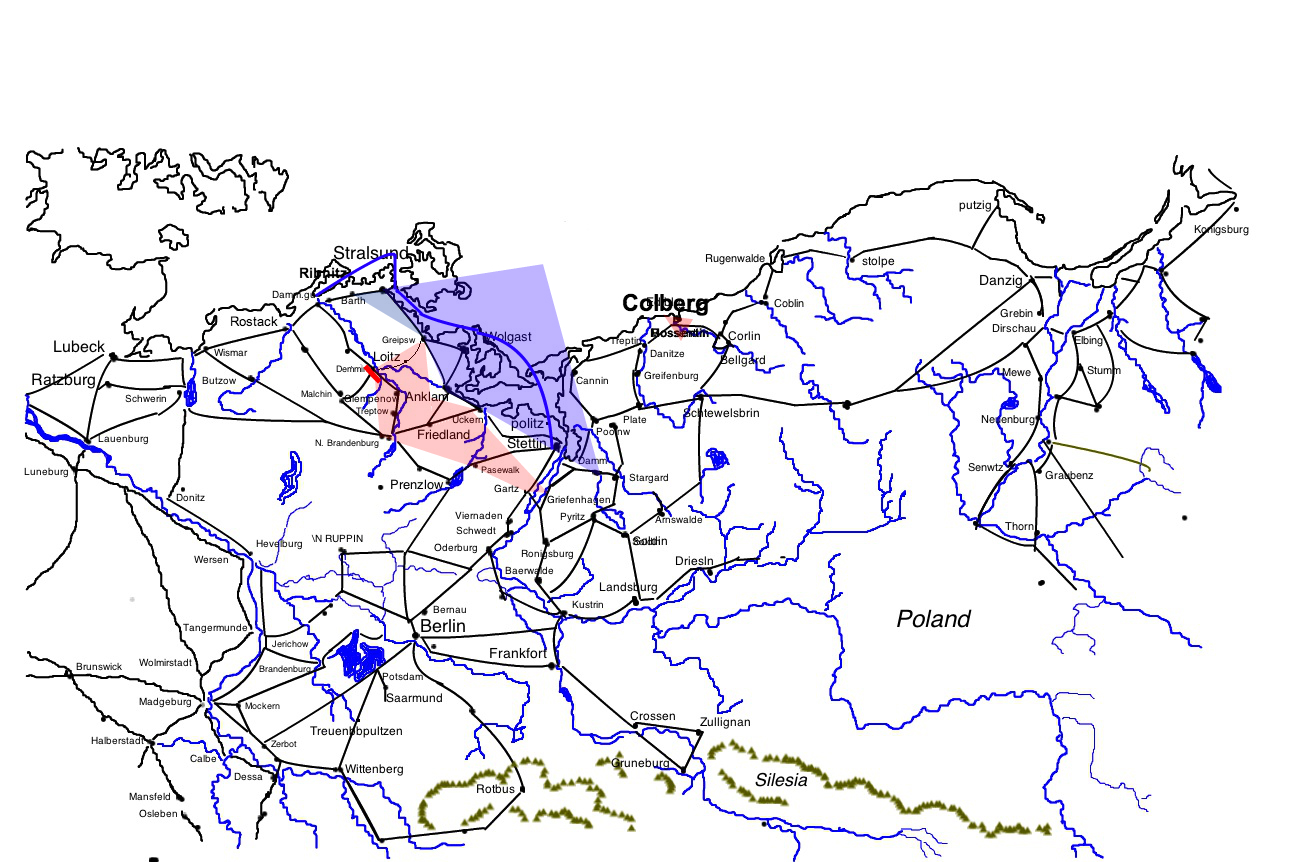
Swedish sail with intention of taking Rostock

Leaving Stettin on 9 September, the king landed at Wolstack. He quickly arrived at Stralsund in anticipation for his advance on Mecklenburg. Although he anticipated reinforcements from Prussia, all that was on hand were the Finns and the Livonians that had been brought up by Horn. In addition, there was sickness in the camp. Every sixth man was sick in this force that was to invade Mecklenburg From here he set sail in the direction of Ribnitz towards Rostock. He then captured both Ribnitz and Damgarten. While here the king learned that there was an army assembling at Demmnitz in the east. This worried the king, and as a result of which he abandoned his scheme of taking Rostock.

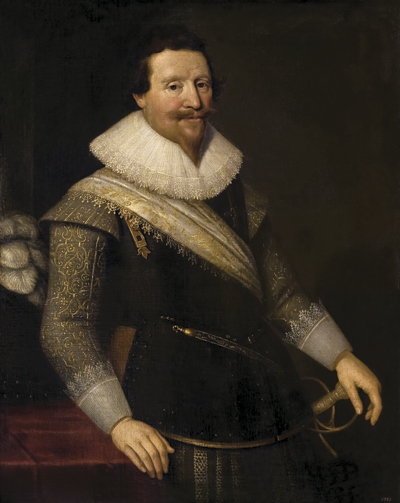
Albrecht von Wallenstein. Born a Protestant, he converted to Catholicism early in life and served the Habsburg monarchy with distinction. He was the most able general the Catholic side produced during the course of the conflict.

However, a turn of events took place that would aide the Swedish further. A congress had been in session at Ratisbon for the last six months, and one of the consequences of this Congress was that Wallenstein was dismissed. Many of the potentates in Germany were prejudiced against him, because of the license he allowed his troops in their dominions. There was a personal rivalry between him and the Elector of Bavaria which also contributed to this. One historian says, "The anxiety with which Wallenstein's enemies pressed for his dismissal, ought to have convinced the emperor of the importance of his services... many armies could not compensate for the loss of this individual". However, despite the unprecedented victories that Wallenstien had brought him, and his virtually unassailable position, he was politically vulnerable and needed to appease the German princes pressing him for Wallenstein's dismissal. The Emperor's son, Ferdinand, had already secured election to the Kingdom of Hungary, and was in the middle of the procedures around securing his election as the next Holy Roman Emperor. The Catholic and Protestant princes (and specifically electors) were unanimous in their outrage and exacerbation with Wallenstein and his mercenary army, and were in a position to leverage the Emperor's action in a material way. Maximilian's support for his son's election, was critical, so Wallenstein had to be abandoned for the sake of assuring his son's succession.

Tilly was rewarded with the command, but a large part of the Imperial army, being mercenaries as they were, had been under contract to Wallenstein personally, rather than to the Emperor. As a result of this, upon the dismissal of Wallenstein the mercenaries that were under contract to Wallenstein dispersed. Many of these soldiers would enlist in the Swedish service, and it is related that they were quickly brought up to the Swedish standard of discipline. The king deemed Wallenstein to be such an able general, that upon learning of his dismissal, he reached out to him and requested that he serve under him. The Catholic cause had lost an able general. Additionally, the army which he headed, 100,000 strong, was entirely under his command. Both the officers and the men were personally loyal to him. The majority of the officers in the main army quit the imperial service.

== Temporary setbacks ==
Turning his sights away from Rostock for the time being, the king determined that he must take the Tollense river before progressing. However, before doing this he decided to definitively settle the Kolberg question, and opted, instead of continued observation of the town, to take it. This was so he could communicate completely with Oxenstierna. Horn, the general who had been allocated to command the Kolberg region and see about the taking of Kolberg itself, was informed of an Imperial plan to march to Kolberg from Garz and relieve it. Horn assembled all of the forces that he could, leaving a small force to observe Kolberg, and marched towards Rossentin, immediately to the south of Kolberg to await the arrival of the Imperial army from Garz. The Imperials, hoping to avoid detection, marched via an elaborate circuit to the south.

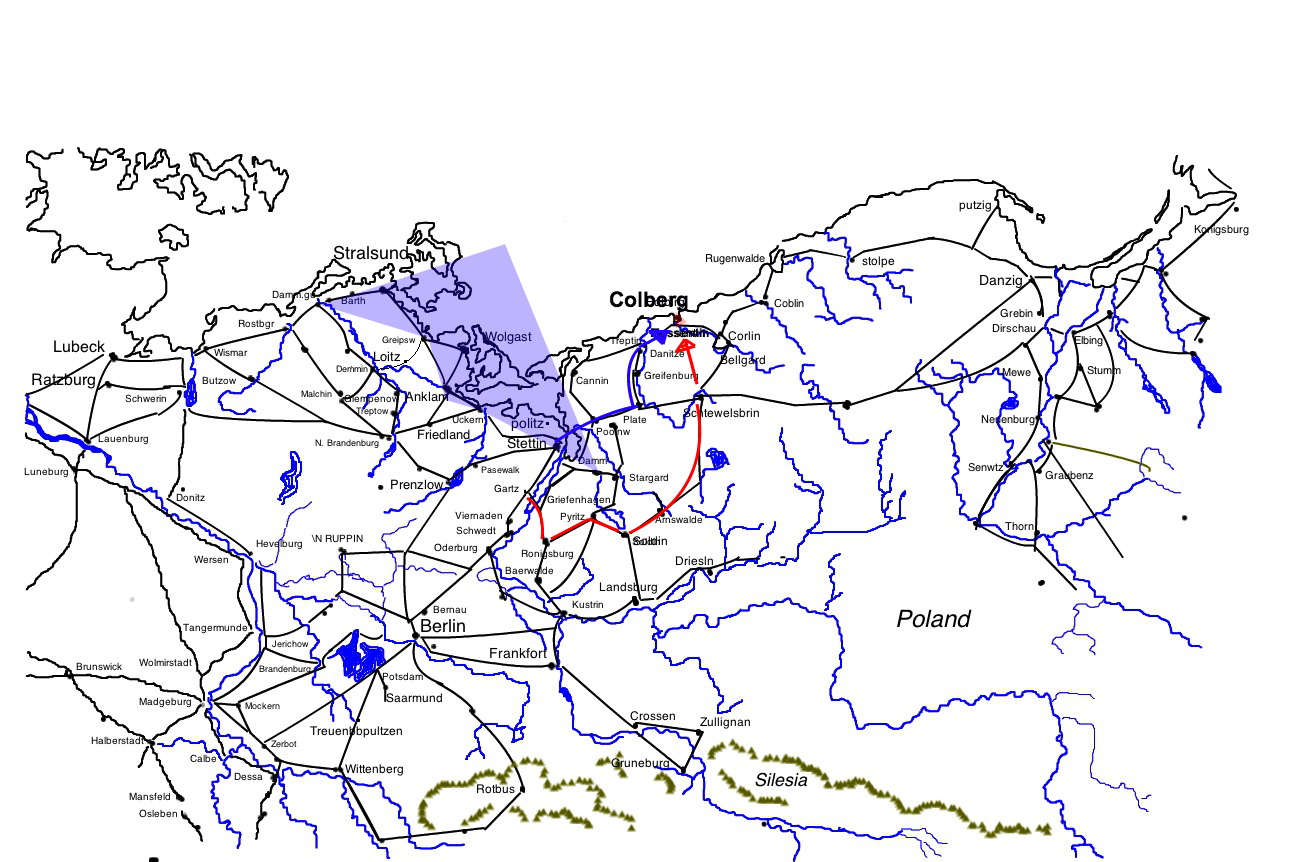
Imperial circuit

However, their movement and subsequent attack was repulsed, and they retreated. However, the Imperials were eager to take and relieve the city, and expecting to catch the Swedes off guard, contemplated another move on Kolberg. For whatever reason, during the beginning of this plan it lost impetus, and the army that was marching to relieve Kolberg became disorganized. Upon arriving on the eastern side of his new acquisitions, the king assembled his generals, got all the knowledge from them pertaining to the dispositions of the enemy forces, and resolved to attack Garz. The time for wintering his troops was nearing, but he desired to strike a blow to the Catholic cause before taking to camp for the winter.

The army moved mostly down the right (east) bank of the Oder towards Gartz. There were also troops on the left (western) bank that were kept in constant communication with the main army via the naval force that was to keep the two armies in communication with each other. Moving towards Greifenhagen first, when the Imperial general in command of the city observed the army coming to his position he deemed it to be nothing more than a salvo that was typical of the Swedes to distract him. However, the Swedes camped in a nearby forest, and the next day, on Christmas Day, after a solemn observation of religious traditions was observed, the attack was begun. A breach was made in the Greifenhagen fortifications, and the king in person led the first assault. After this place was successfully assaulted, the Imperial troops here started to retreat towards their comrades in Western Pomerania.

The next day the king marched his army towards Garz, in preparation for battle in battle order, but the Imperials soon retreated. They moved to the south in a southeasterly direction, certain units were detailed to hold Custrin and Landsberg, in order to ensure that they were not cut off from Frankfurt. The king sent units towards these cities to prevent the retreat of the Imperials, but Landsberg the king deemed to be too strong to assault. Satisfied with this victory, his army marched back to Neumark Konigsburg.

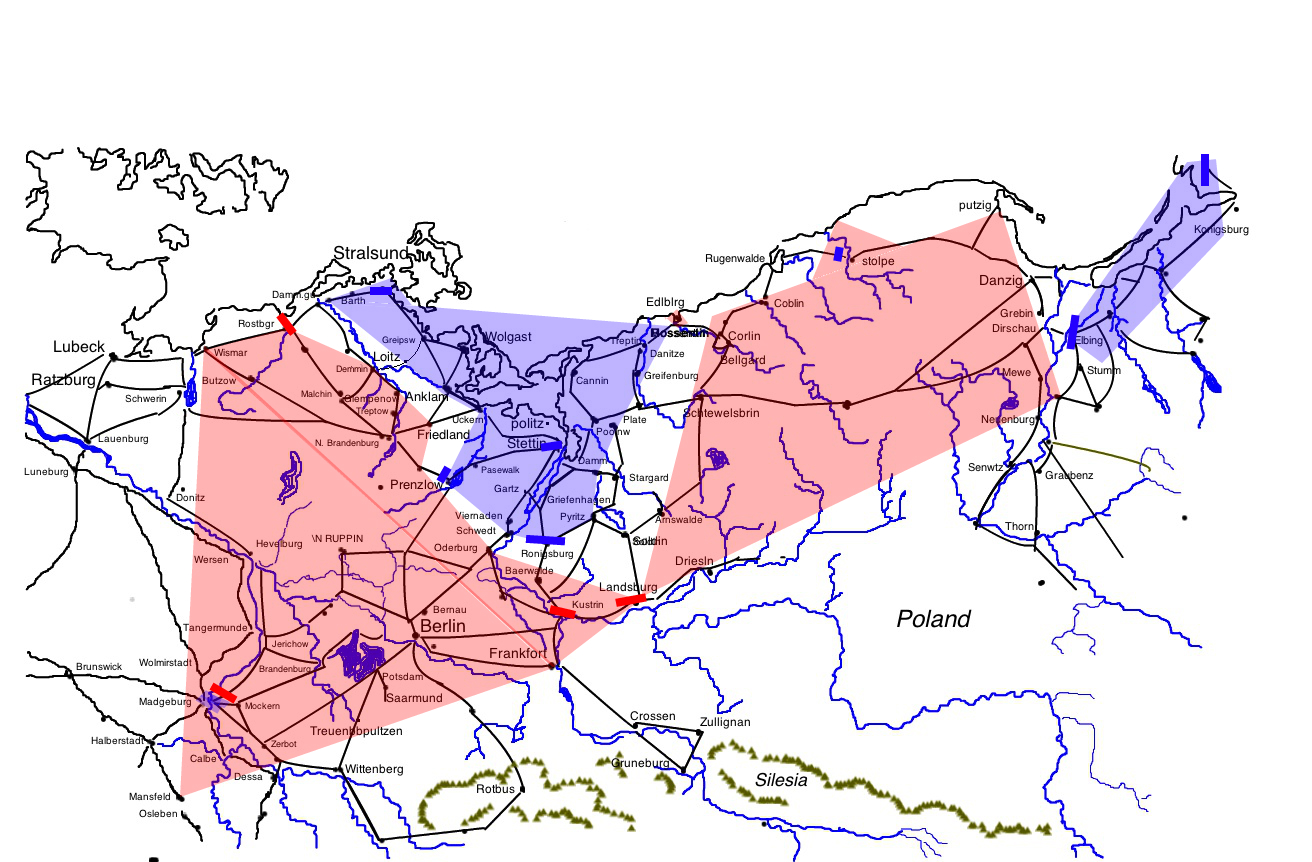
Dispositions of the armies after the victory of the Swedish at Garz

== Frankfurt ==
Having taken Gartz and Greifenburg, which if utilized properly could lead the king, through Prussia and Silesia into Ferdinand's hereditary possessions, the king left Horn with six regiments of infantry and six of cavalry. These were faced towards the Warta river, with orders to keep the enemy pinned in the Warta country between the Landsberg and Küstrin neighborhood. Instructions were left to Horn not to engage the enemy outright, to act strictly on the defensive against a numerically superior enemy and if the opportunity should arise, seek to seize Frankfurt and Landsberg. His reserves were stationed in Pyritz, Stargard and Gollnow. These were stationed there so that he could retreat towards them if a numerically larger foe should present itself against his front at Soldin, while simultaneously protecting Swedish gains along the right bank of the Oder and Eastern Pomerania.

The king set out from Bärwalde to Stettin, crossed there and accumulated 12,000 men. From Stettin he marched through Germany towards Prenzlau, Neubrandenburg. Taking Neubrandenburg, the Imperial garrison at Treptow also retreated for fear of being captured. The next day Klempenow was also taken. These towns were important, because they could prevent any Imperial armies from advancing north to relieve Demmin. Upon taking Demmin, the king would hold the entirety of the Tollense river. This he had set out some time back to do, but had been distracted from the project. Being winter as it was, the king could afford to take up a project that was comparatively conservative in scope for a winter campaign as such that he was in the process of conducting. In addition, in spite of the fact that it was winter, it was important that he should establish a firm base between the Stralsund and Stettin country. With this line secured, his proposed expedition into Mecklenburg would be more secure.

Demmin was at the confluence of three rivers, and the ground was something of a bog. As it was mid-January significant portions of the area were somewhat frozen, and this aided the Swedish in their siege of the place. Knyphausen, who was at that time stationed at Greifswald and besieging it, was ordered to come south and aide in the siege at Demmin. Loitz, and city that is in between Greifswald and Demmin, had to be taken first though, as it was in the way. The king took it before sitting in front of Demmin, and after having taken it he urged Knyphausen to come as quickly as possible. In addition to making room for Knyphausen's army to come up on eastern side of Demmin, it also blocked Greifswald and left it completely without aid.

As a result of this manoeuvre Tilly was placed in a difficult position. He wanted to go straight ahead towards Mecklenburg, but if he left only the reserve he had in the Landsberg country (8,000 men), then he feared that Horn would push these reserves out of Landsberg and establish the Swedes on the Warta river. Inversely, if he stayed here to protect the Warta line (which if opened would give the Swedes free access into the hereditary lands of the Austrian emperors), then the Swedish would have an easy time of marching into Mecklenburg over the Havel and relieving the siege at Magdeburg. Tilly deemed it important to take Magdeburg, as taking it would be an impressive morale victory over the Swedes and, he thought, it would keep the Protestant powers of Germany cowed. Additionally, Maximilian I, Duke of Bavaria was pressuring him from Dresden to strike a decisive blow by taking this city. Strategically, he wanted to ensure that Demmin wasn't taken. Since the Swedes had all the towns that were on the most direct route between Frankfurt and Demmin, he made a circuit to the south. This allowed him to simultaneously move towards his objective and at the same time ensure the siege of Magdeburg continued by quickly gaining a secure footing on the Havel from which he could prevent the Swedes from relieving Magdeburg. However, in addition to making this indirect route, he had to march through the Electorate of Brandenburg as tenderly as possible. As Brandenburg had not declared for either side, it still retained a neutrality, but only in the technical sense. Enough so that Tilly could demand to march through the Electors territory, but sought to alleviate the worst of the enmity this might arouse in the elector by avoiding his capital, Berlin. After making this "tender" march, he finally arrived in Neuruppin. As the Havel was behind him, he had achieved one of his objectives, that of keeping Magdeburg safe. However, from this position he now marched north in order to help relieve Demmin.

However, Tilly was not able to come to the support of his subordinate in time. After two days of sitting before the city, Savelli believed that he could not hold Demmin, and surrendered on condition of his army not serve in Pomerania and Mecklenburg for three months. This city was well stored, as it had anticipated holding out for a while against a Swedish siege. However, as the city was given up after only two days, the Swedes gained all of the provisions. Among the baggage that was discovered, which as per the agreement was to be returned to the Imperials, were the possessions of a Quinti Del Ponte, a man who had served under the Swedish but was paid to betray them and then deserted. The king was asked what he would like to do with him, but he stated that he had no intention of taking petty revenge.

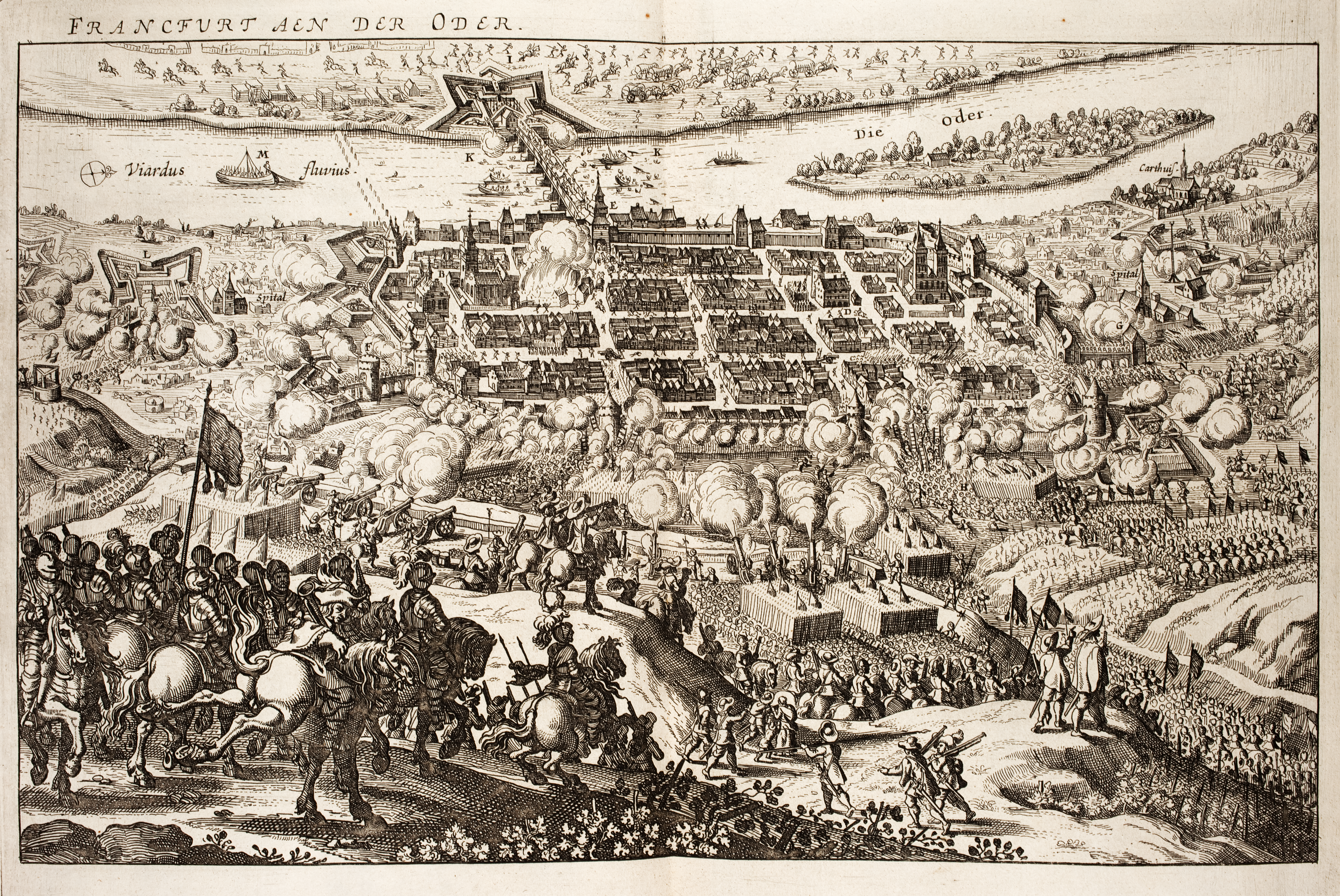
Battle of Frankfurt an der Oder, by Matthäus Merian

With much success in Pomerania, the estates in the duchy were finally roused to action, and offered their support to the Swedes. 10,000 infantry and 3,000 cavalry were offered to garrison the duchy itself. This was valuable because the Swedes would be able to free up men from garrison duty and bring them into the field. In the face of the Imperial armies, and their sheer size, this was a sorely needed acquisition.

Although the king was seriously considering wintering his troops at the present, he himself, as well as Knyphausen, came to believe that Tilly was contemplating a march on Neuruppin in an attempt to relieve the siege that was taking place at Greifswald. As the siege was important and he didn't want to lighten up the impetus of the siege taking place, he ordered Horn to march towards Friedland in order to ensure the Knyphausen did not have to move troops away from the siege to prevent Tilly from reaching Greifswald.

Kolberg had previously fallen, and Gustavus believed that the manoeuvres by Tilly were designed in part to compensate for this loss. Which was indeed a blow to the Imperialist cause. The king moved back to the Oder, thinking that it would draw Tilly away from his advance towards the siege, Stralsund and Stettin. He proposed marching on either Frankfurt or Landsberg. Tilly does not seem to have paid any attention to this manoeuvre. Instead he marched towards Stargard, the one just south of Neu–Brandenburg. Stargard was not a place that could be easily defended, the king did not believe in the strength of the position, and informed Knyphausen of this. He had ordered Knyphausen to plan on retreating after an honorable period of time, but the messengers had been seized and Knyphausen held out to the last. The city was breached, and only Knyphausen and three other man survived the siege. The subsequent looting of the city was allegedly horrible.

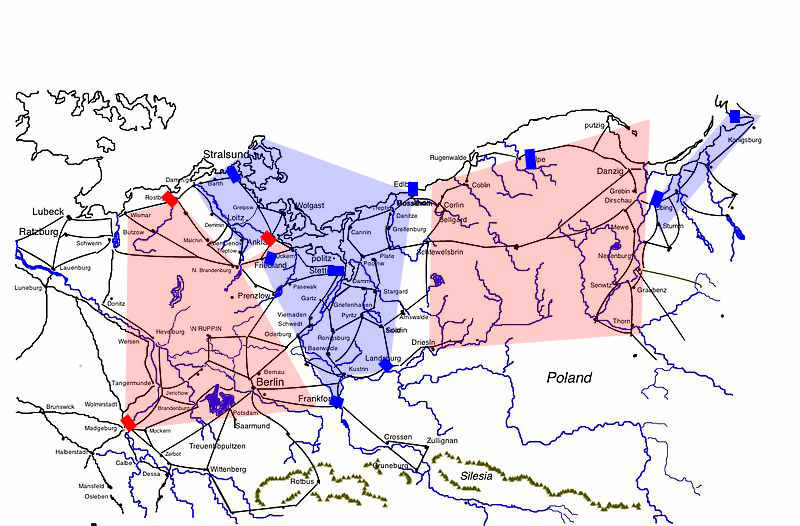
The position of the Imperialist and Swedish armies after the capture of Landsberg and Frankfurt

After this siege thought an Imperialist victory, Tilly retreated. He failed to capitalize on his victory. Seeing this, the king continued with his plan toward Frankfurt. However, before advancing towards Frankfurt he was informed that the Imperialists had sent a detachment of the force that had been left at Landsberg towards Anklam. They had taken this place. In spite of this, the king ignored it, this would have been considered a very bold manoeuvre at the time, but despite the fact that the king had a force that could easily operate on his lines of communication, he continued his advance south. Moving from Schwedt the king moved his force south towards Frankfurt along the Oder.

Arriving in front of Frankfurt on 3 April 1631, a breach was made, and from this breach the city was taken. This battle was a solid victory for the Protestant cause. On the fifth the king continued his advance. He marched towards Landsberg after driving Imperialist cavalry attachments which were placed in the country surrounding Landsberg.

On the 15th, the king positioned his army outside of Landsberg. Banér, with five regiments, set out from Frankfurt, who had been stationed there, to join him in the siege of Landsberg. The siege was begun the same day. There was situated outside of Landsberg a strongly entrenched fortress, and it was clear to the king that if he wanted to acquire the city, he must first take this fortress. He had cannons brought up and fired upon the fortress. After a minimal exchange of artillery fire and the repulse of a sortie, the king stiffly offered terms to Landsberg. The next day the terms were accepted and the 4,000 Imperialist soldiers abandoned the city and fortress promising not to serve in the war for the next eight months.

== Diplomatic difficulties and the fall of Magdeburg ==
With the recent string of victories, the left flank (eastern flank) of the army was secure. There were two courses of action available to the king at this time; The first, was to march through Silesia which would lead him through the lands attached to the Bohemian crown (a crown which Ferdinand held) directly to Vienna and bring the Habsburgs and the Catholics to terms by compelling them to sign a treaty after occupying Vienna. Despite the advantages of this scenario, for whatever reason the king deemed it to not be the best course of action.

The second course was to march to Magdeburg and relieve the siege taking place there and unite with his real and potential allies in Mecklenburg. Despite the king's inclination, he had promised aid to the besieged city. At the present however, all he had done was send an able officer to oversee the construction of the defensive fortifications, train the local militia and oversee the defense itself once the siege commenced.

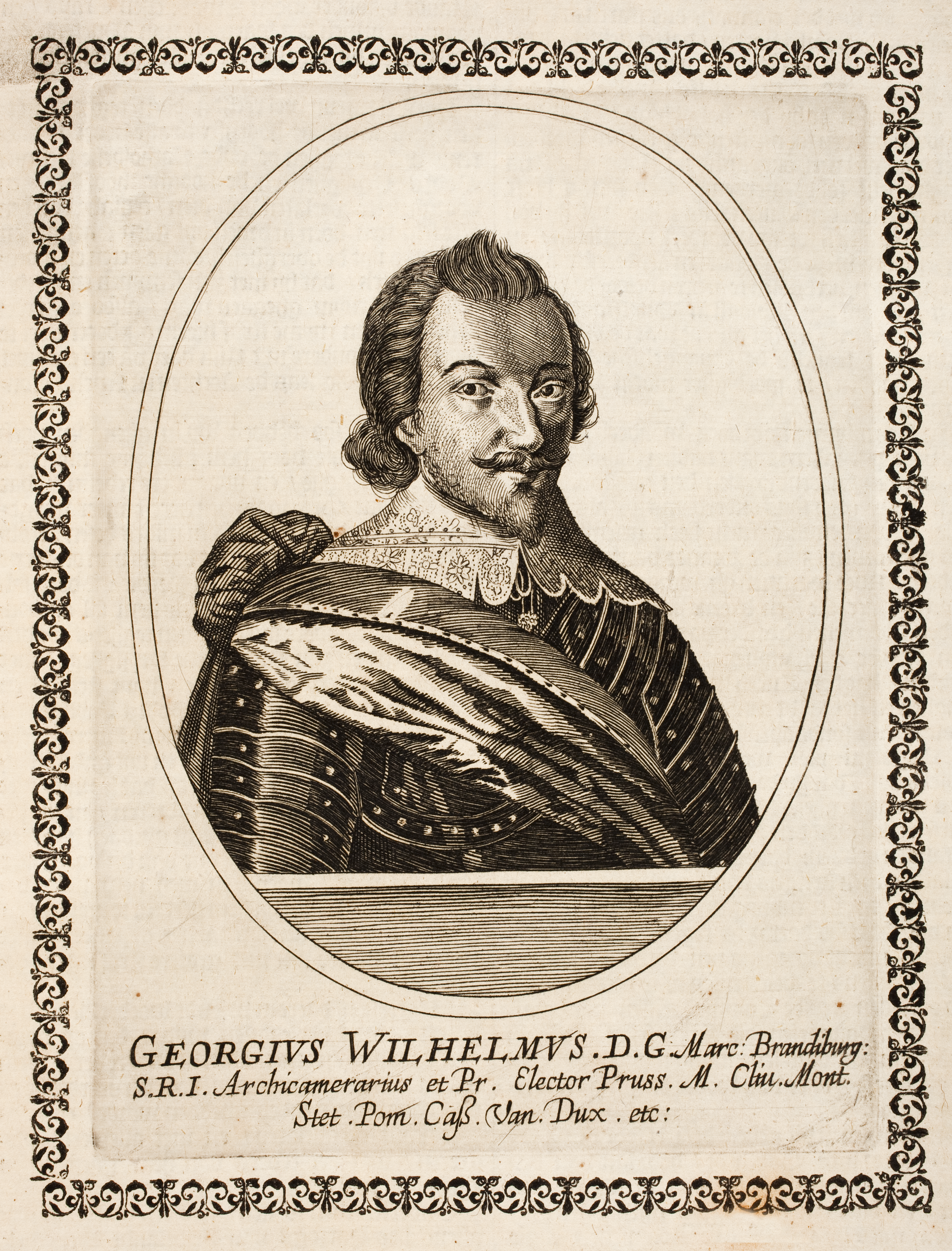
George William, Elector of Brandenburg, Duke of Prussia. His sister was the Queen of Sweden. He sought a policy of neutrality for much of the Thirty Years' War, but was unable to keep his fiefdom out of the conflict – as Sweden occupied much of Ducal Prussia's coastal regions since 1623. He was one of the German Protestant principals whose distrust was to prove problematical to the Swedes during their campaigns in Germany. His government was largely dominated by his ministers.

However, despite the fact that it was clear to the king what he wanted to do, it was to prove to be more difficult to bring about. If the king had not yet fully grasped the recalcitrance and distrust that existed among the Protestant German powers towards himself, then he would develop a proper appreciation of the situation in short order. After the taking of Landsberg and Frankfurt, the king, anticipating that Tilly would advance towards these places from Neuruppin via Küstrin, ordered that the bridge that which was situated in Küstrin (which would allow armies to march over the Oder) be destroyed. Küstrin was a part of the Electorate of Brandenburg, and the Prince-Elector of Brandenburg, George William – the king's own brother in law – felt that his neutrality had been violated and proved difficult to deal with because of this. In addition to his sister being the Queen of Sweden, George William was the vassal of Gustavus' cousin and most inveterate foe, Sigismund III Vasa, in his capacity as duke of the Duchy of Prussia. George William's father had paid homage to Sigismund, and he would later do fealty to his son. An illustration of the complicated international relations that typified the period, which were further complicated by the personal relationships of the rulers themselves.

The king wanted to set up his base of operations at the Spandau Citadel near Berlin for the campaign that would lead him to the Elbe. This place was also within the realm of George William. The king met with George William and expressed his wish to get both Küstrin and Spandau into his possession. George William denied the request – despite their relations and common cause. After attempting to deal diplomatically with George William's vacillation, he finally informed him that if these places were not handed over to him voluntarily, he would take them with force. Arrangements were then made by George William, who felt himself to be diplomatically isolated from both Saxony and the Habsburgs, to surrender the two places. Even after the king began his advance towards Magdeburg, George William, proving recreant to his trust, did not surrender complete control of Spandau to the Swedish.

In addition, Pomerania was not meeting the quota of men and resources that it had promised to the Swedes. The money that was supposed to be delivered to the king for the conduct of the war, both from Sweden itself as well as the powers that had promised financial aid, were not coming in on time. Also, the army had been hard pressed by the previous winter, particularly the cavalry, which had been pushed to the limit. The cavalry of the Swedish force on the whole was not on par with the Imperialists because of this. Conditions had become so bad that the men had started to engage in looting and banditry, which the king addressed by punishing the perpetrators of these actions.

Having acquired Spandau, the king set out in the direction of Magdeburg on 8 May. It was on his way to Dessau – near the border to the Electorate of Saxony – that he learned of the difficulties that George William was going to impose on his operations – although they were largely immaterial – it was indicative of the difficulties that George William was going to cause. There were multiple routes through which the Swedish army could reach Magdeburg. However, the ones that were to the south of Saxony had been ruined by the occupation of Imperial forces, as a result of which he would not be able to feed the army that had been designated as, "The Army of the Elbe".

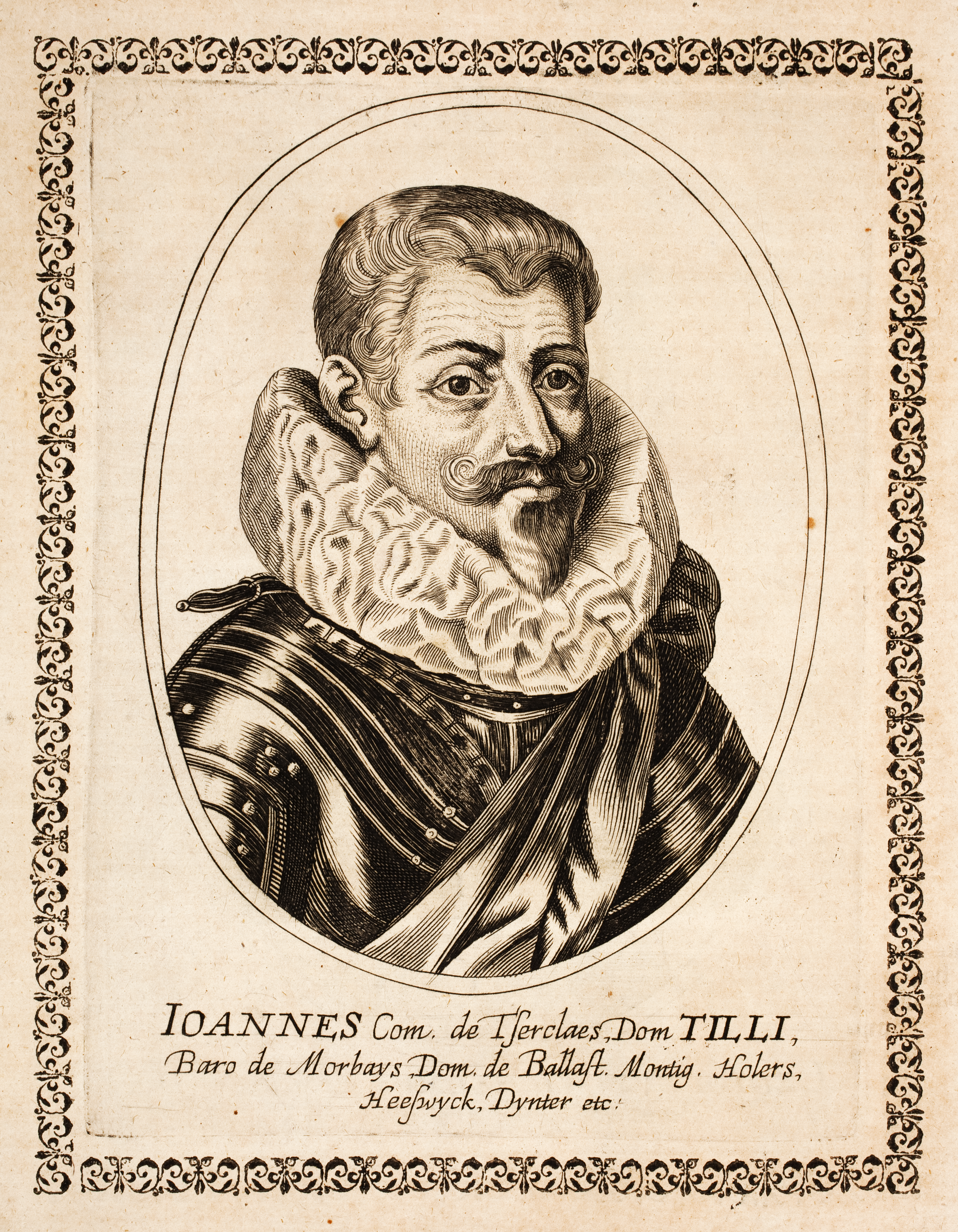
Engraving of Johann Tserclaes, "Tilly"

In addition, he did not have pontoon bridges with which he could construct a bridge over the Elbe. All of the boats that were in the Elbe and in the vicinity had been seized by the Imperial armies – and the river Elbe itself is very wide. Given that time was of the essence in relation to the period of time that Magdeburg could hold out and the deficiencies of the other routes, Dessau was the most strategically advantageous option.

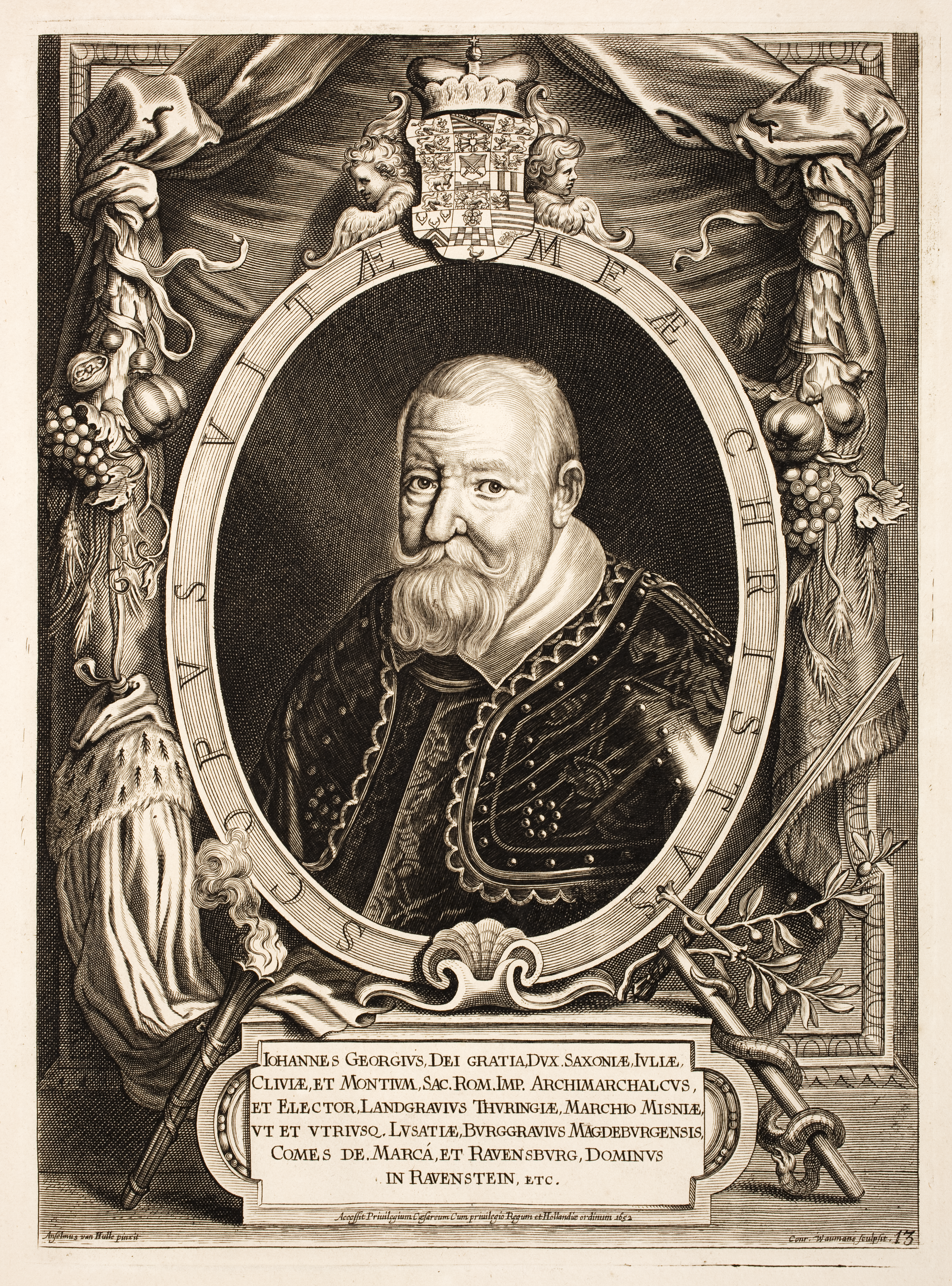
Engraving of John George I, Elector of Saxony.

Given the size and strength of Saxony and Brandenburg, and the problems that they could pose to his lines of communication should he handle them too severely they had to be handled with care and a certain degree of deference. The king had hoped that he would have an easier time dealing with the Elector of Saxony, John George I than he had had with George William. John George, who earlier been fearful of the growing power of Brandenburg (and the Hohenzollern's generally), was easily induced to employ his electoral vote in favor of Ferdinand and had been a faithful subordinate of Ferdinand in the Bohemian revolt, not least because the emperor had granted him the rich province of Lusatia that had been ruled by Bohemia until then. However, the aggression of the Habsburgs in Germany towards Protestants, and Protestant princes in possession of secularized lands was undeniable. After the edict of restitution was issued, it was undeniable where Germany was headed in the hands of the Habsburgs. John George, however, was insightful enough to appreciate that neutrality would gain his electorate nothing, and instead sought to erect a third power in Germany in contradistinction to the Habsburgs and Sweden. He was unable to effect this however, and was isolated as a result of his early adherence to Ferdinand.

After embassies and letters were exchanged between John George and the King, some of the former were just ignored, John George refused him access to his territories. John George had 40,000 men at his disposal, and these could be brought to bear against the Swedish should they not handle Saxony respectfully. He was therefore in a difficult position, and as he deemed it more important to do everything in his power to ensure that Saxony did not join the Imperials, he did not make the march through Saxony towards Dessau.

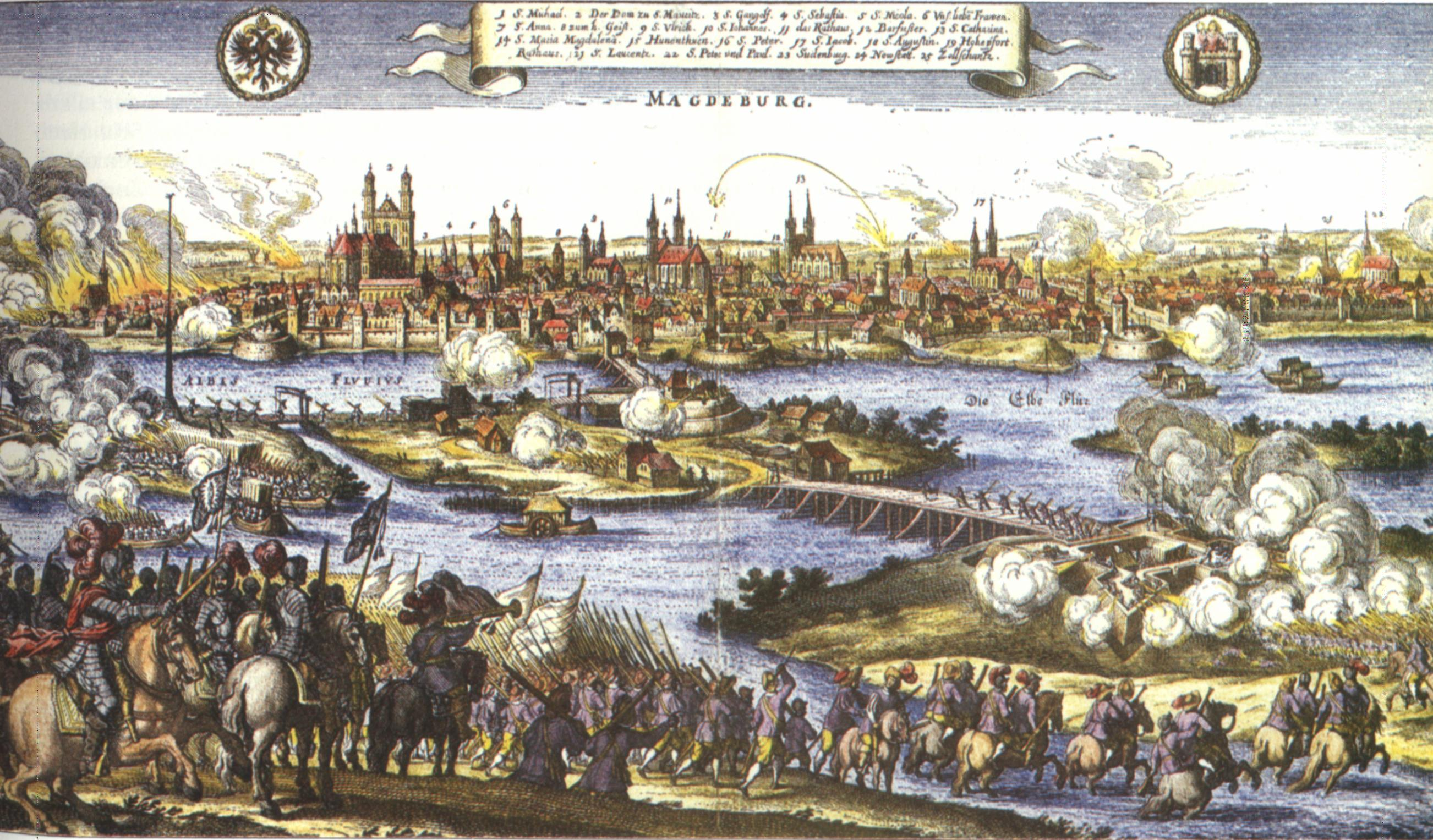
Sack of Magdeburg. Of the 30,000 citizens, only 5,000 survived.

Magdeburg was at this point in a desperate position. Although initially there had been only 6,000 Imperial forces observing the town under Pappenheim, Tilly had by mid-April brought 25,000 men to take the city. Falkenburg had been sent to bring the city to the highest level of defense that he could given the means that he had at his disposal. He had brought the force defending the city to 2,500 men in addition to the city militia. However, now the colonel had a much larger force in front of him – and despite the positive news of Swedish victories in the east – given the situation that prevailed in Magdeburg these were not received very well. Morale in the city was low. The governor of the town, the town council, the people of the city and the strong minority of Catholic supporters were constantly bickering. In the beginning of May Tilly started to negotiate with the town. He was fearful of the Swedish relieving the siege, and was therefore eager to see it brought back into Imperial possession by any means. However, nothing came of these negotiations in time. By 19 May, Tilly was so fearful that he proposed making a final assault on the city. By this point the only surrender he would accept from the town was an unconditional one. The town council agreed to surrender the city, but Falkenburg requested to have an audience with the council at 4 am on the following morning to talk them out of it. Despite the fact that the Imperial negotiator was still in the city awaiting the final answer of the city council, Tilly ordered the final assault on the city. Many of the officers and soldiers had abandoned the defensive works because they knew the final decision of the town council was being made. Falkenburg, hearing of the assault despite the fact that Tilly was supposed to be awaiting the council's answer, summoned all the men that he could and led an effort against the assault. Although he achieved some initial successes, Falkenburg died in the defense. Shortly thereafter the city was sacked.

== The Elbe ==
Upon receiving news of the fall of Magdeburg, the king ordered his forces to retreat towards the Oder. As many blamed the king for the fall of Magdeburg, the king released a manifesto blaming John George for the fall of Magdeburg. The king, fearful that Tilly would take advantage of his victory at Magdeburg, took a number of measures to secure his possessions on the Oder. First of all he ordered Horn to reconstruct the bridge that had been destroyed at Schaumberg so that he might retreat across it if necessary; secondly, he ordered that Frankfurt be strongly fortified.

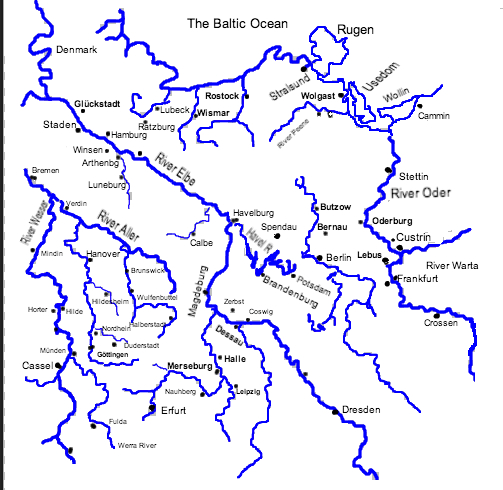
A map of Germany with a focus on the Elbe

The king also ordered the following dispositions to be taken by the army. Banér was entrusted with the center; his forces were stationed at Brandenburg, Rathenow, Potsdam, Bernau and Bützow. Fehrbellin was to be the headquarters.

Horn was trusted with the left, but he had only 1,500 men to hold it. After the victory at Magdeburg, forces were gathered in Silesia to march up the Oder and attack the Swedish left. There was an outpost at Crossen which occasionally was engaged by the Imperialists. He was to take particular care of the bridges at Frankfurt, Landsberg and Schaumberg. The king assured him of relief with forces from the center if matters should become problematical. He was also to recruit forces in this area in order to ensure that his forces were of sufficient strength to hold the flank. Shortly thereafter he received orders to march to Crossen and establish a strong camp there.

While the king was establishing plans for his advance at Stettin, the Tsar of Russia, Alexis of Russia, sent an embassy informing the king of his goodwill and offered an auxiliary force. The king refused the force but thanked the Tsar for his friendly disposition.

Despite the king's fear of Tilly after his victory, Tilly made no moves to advance on the Swedes and push them back to the sea. He feared moving to the east because of the force that the landgrave of Hesse-Kassel, William V, was assembling. The landgrave was one of the only ardent supporters of the Swedish, and it had previously been the intention of the king to meet the landgrave via northern Mecklenburg and join their respective forces.

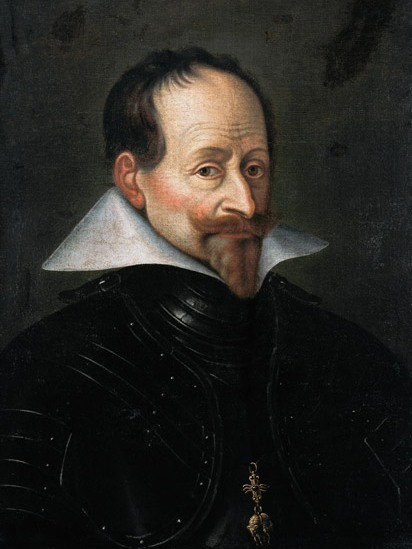
Maximilian I, Elector of Bavaria, Duke of Bavaria, Elector of Bavaria (Elector Palatine) and president of the Catholic League. Maximilian was a skilled politician and one of the principal beneficiaries of the Thirty Years' War. After the revolt of Frederick V against Ferdinand, which sparked the whole conflict, Maximilian was rewarded with Frederick's electoral dignity. Frederick, as a descendant of the Wittelsbach house was Elector Palatine and Imperial Vicar and thereby held the honor of being among other things the first to vote in Imperial elections. His electoral dignity was the most prestigious in the empire, and its passage to Maximilian increased his prestige considerably.

Tilly wanted to prevent his forces from being surrounded from the West by Hesse–Kassel and the Swedish in the East. Consequently, Tilly marched north with 17,500 infantry, 7,000 horses, and 28 guns. While en route he received 9,000 infantrymen and 2,000 horse from the Catholic League and four regiments from the Spanish Netherlands (which were in possession of the primary branch of the Habsburgs). In addition to this, there were 25,000 men in Italy marching towards Germany, but these were seriously delayed and only reached the Elbe a year later.

While en route, the John George made it clear that he would resist either side that opted to march through his territory. Tilly, who feared that Saxony would soon join the Swedish cause, as the Protestant powers had been more outraged by the sack of Magdeburg than cowed.

The king, at this point fed up with the vacillation of George William, finally opted to bring the issue to a head once and for all. He marched to Berlin from Spandau and required the Elector make a new treaty with him. The provisions of this treaty were that the Swedes were to retain Spandau for good, the Swedish should be allowed to march through Küstrin at will, and were to receive 30,000 thalers a month from the Elector.

An Imperialist party, which seems to have lost its way, was seen outside of Malchin. This made the king fear that the Imperialists were going to make a move to relieve the siege at Greifswald, and as a result of this ordered the commander of the area, Åke Tott to move all available forces to Greifswald and to storm the place. After the Imperialist commander of the garrison was killed in the initial bombardments, the remaining force sent an ambassador to Tott on 25 June and sued for peace. The king commended Tott for his work and promoted him to the rank of field marshal, who then advanced into Mecklenburg and reinstated the dukes whose duchies had been taken from them by the Imperialists. These too, however were to prove recalcitrant allies and were slow to provide aid to the Swedish. Mirow, Bützow, Schwerin and Plau were all taken. All that was left as a result of this advance was Rostock, Wismar and Dömitz. Many of the forces in these cities, rather than being paroled or taken prisoner, opted to enlist in the Swedish service.

Banér had been busy securing the Spree–Havel line, and took Havelberg while he was busy doing so.

Meanwhile, Tilly had been busy enforcing the Emperor's edict of restitution – when the Emperor would have been more well served by his lieutenant if he had isolated the German Protestants from Sweden and or compelling the Swedish into direct conflict. Instead, they were allowed to pick away at the Catholic power with victories everywhere of greater or lesser significance everywhere. Which, while each in and of themselves insignificant, collectively were significant and formidable and placed the Swedish in strategically and in morally superior positions from which they would be well placed to gain decisive victories against the Habsburg monarchy and the Catholic League. Additionally, in the process of enforcing the edict he was fostering resentment and outrage, in addition to dividing the troops of his principal army.

He had been ordering parties of his force to issue orders to all the German princelings to hand over various cities and towns of strategic significance and to disband their forces, which they were ostensibly raising to maintain their neutrality. As Protestant Germany had been more outraged then cowed by the sack of Magdeburg, in reality these forces were being raised to defend themselves against clear Imperial aggression and maintain their rights as independent princes of their principalities. From his march from Magdeburg, Tilly progressed north towards Hesse–Kassel and seized Oldisleben and Muhlhausen in June. He also captured Gotha, Eisenach, and Weimar. Erfurt purchased its safety by paying Tilly. Tilly sent embassies to the landgrave of Hesse–Kassel ordering him to disband his forces, 6,000 of which were stationed in strongly placed cities. William refused Tilly' s order and assembled his forces at Kassel.

Around this time, 8,000 fresh reinforcements arrived from Sweden. 4,000 of these were ordered to the Havel to join the main army. The balance of the force was ordered to march to Mecklenburg to serve under Tott. Tott was to join the king and bring with him an additional 4,000 veterans. During this time 7,000 soldiers from England arrived under the Marquis Hamilton. These soldiers arrived on the Peene, instead of on the Weser, as had been expected. The king ordered them to march to Horn who was to distribute 4,000 of his total force along the Oder line. Horn himself was to bring the rest of his force to join the king.

Having concentrated his forces on the Havel, the king made his move to the Elbe. With 7,000 men of the line and 3,000 horse, he proceeded from Brandenburg towards Burg. The king moved towards Jerichow, which roused Pappenheim, who had been left behind by Tilly at Magdeburg, to action.

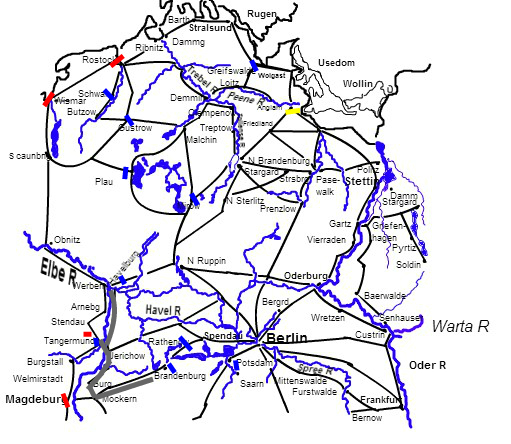
Advance of the Swedes to the Elbe. Counter march not depicted. English reinforcements in yellow

While the king was at Jerichow, Pappenheim was personally at Tangermünde, just north on the other side of the Elbe. The king wanted Pappenheim to believe that he was moving towards Magdeburg, and started to march in that direction. Pappenheim, seeking to ensure that he did not get there before he did, marched off toward Magdeburg. However, the king immediately turned his army around, marched it north, sent a couple of hundred men across to the left (western) bank of the Elbe and captured Tangermünde. The Swedes collected all of the boats they could, and then advanced further north up Elbe to Werben. Fortifications were installed at the confluence of the Havel and the Elbe, right by Werben.

Tilly, upon receiving the news from Pappenheim, advanced his army south to meet the Swedes. They took up their position at Wolmirstedt, (totaling 27,000 men) north of Magdeburg, and sent out 3 regiments of cavalry to observe what was happening at Werben. The king, by calling in further reinforcements from his lieutenants to the east and north, was able to assemble 16,000 men.

The king personally was at Arneburg. He opted to concentrate his cavalry here. After sending out a party to reconnoitre the enemies position; he moved his forces up on the night of 1 August. Before reaching a place called Burgstall he divided the 4,000 man force into three columns. The first column; under the rheingrave was ordered to attack Burgstall; the second column was to attack Angern; the king marched with the third column, which was in between the two other forces and was marching towards Rheindorf.

The Rheingrave's attack was successful, and he managed to take Burgstall and seize all of the baggage. The column led by the king reached Rheindorf to find that Tilly had received news of the two other engagements and prepared his army and got it into line. Despite the fact that there were only 300 men on hand with the king, the king lead a charge right into the regiment and smashed it. At one point, the king had driven his horse into the action and was surrounded. His life was saved by a loyal captain.

Tilly opted to retreat at this point, and moved his army south back to Tangermünde. Horn subsequently arrived with 9,000 reinforcements to Rathenow, which caused Tilly, for fear of being taken in flank, to move his army back to Wolmirstedt. Between 5 and 8 August, the day on which Tilly retreated, he had lost 6,000 men, in addition to desertions that took place after the defeat at Rheindorf.

The consequences of Tilly's resounding victory at Magdeburg had been nullified. He had not seized on the moment and taken advantage of his victory to drive the Swedish back into their German held possessions. None of the territorial losses that had been sustained by the Catholic League and the Habsburgs and been compensated. Despite the strategic drawback and morale consequences that the Swedes faced with the fall Magdeburg, they had increased their grip on Germany and had achieved one of their primary objectives, securing the southern Baltic coast.

== Hesse–Kassel and Saxony ==
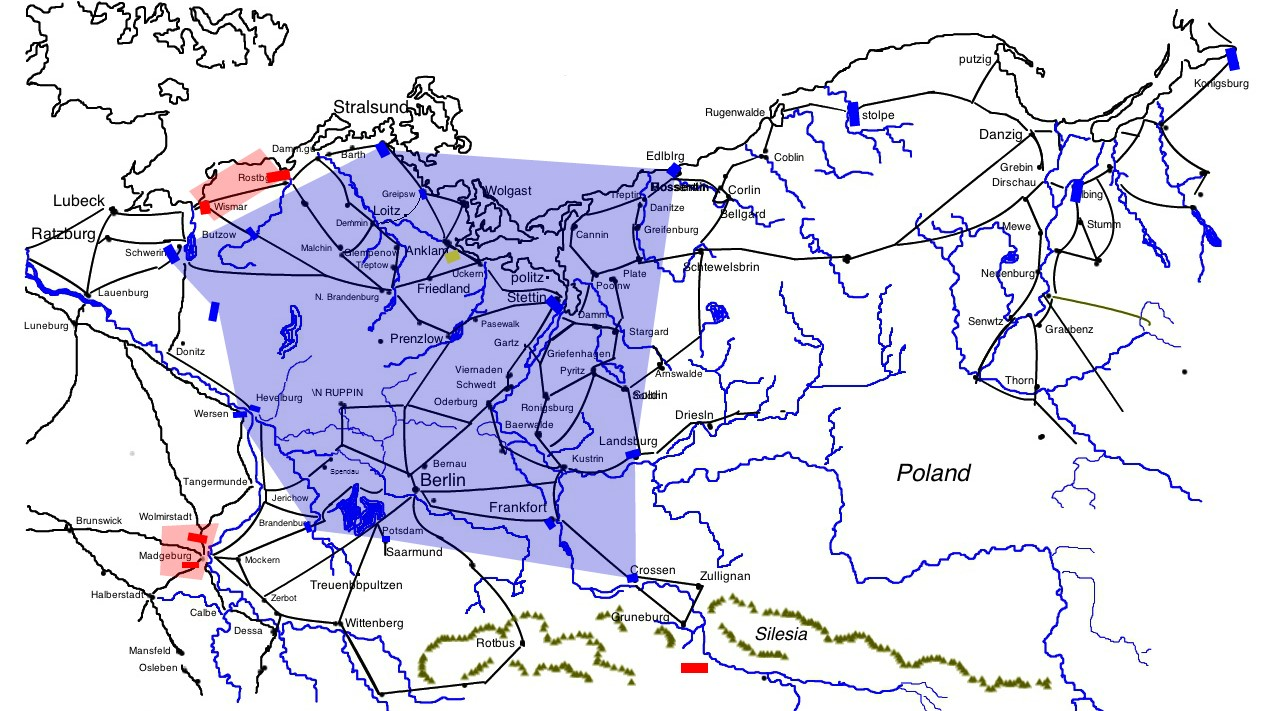
Entire strategic situation in Germany in August

Overall European situation, including Habsburg reinforcements

Reinforcements came to Tilly from Italy. While on their march from Italy, the reinforcements compelled the princelings to submit to the emperor, using the threat of major fines to force them to enlist their troops in the service of the Imperial cause. The recently defeated Tilly, fearing the intervention of Swedish reinforcements from the right (eastern) bank of the Elbe, had placed himself at Wolmirstedt to be close to Hesse–Kassel, Saxony, and Brandenburg.

The king was at Werben, and it was here that he finally met with William of Hesse–Kassel. The landgrave concluded a treaty with the Swedish. Weimar, a city of note, was also included in this treaty. These parties were to reject the emperor and his forces from wherever they had it in their power to do so, and in return the Swedish were obligated to protect their new allies.

The king left his camp at Werben under Baudissin and Teuffel, a force that he deemed to be suitable to defend the location against any Imperial attack, and left with 18,000 troops. As opposed to operating on his base, he opted to operate on the Havel. His goal was to push Tilly into Saxony, and thereby compel a decision upon the Elector of Saxony to either side with him, or against him. He had little doubt, acting upon the emperor's orders, Tilly would soon force the Elector's hand. Once the Swedes had pushed the Imperial forces into the Electorate, he anticipated that the issue would naturally come to a head of itself. Additionally, by advancing in a southerly direction from the Havel, he anticipated that once the Elector had made his decision, he would be ideally placed to join his forces with the Elector.

Leipzig and Breitenfeld

In Tangermünde, Tilly informed the Hessians that they must submit to Imperial rule and disarm. He ordered his soldiers to act in a heavy handed manner, and after encountering stiff resistance from Bernard of Saxe-Weimar, recently promoted by the king for his successful leadership of a column against Burgstall in support of the King, they retreated. His purpose was to obey Ferdinand's orders, which were to march to Saxony and compel the Elector to disarm and submit. Devastating the region as he went, he set out towards Leipzig. He arrived in Halle on 4 September, and proceeded to Merseburg. He ordered John George to disband his new levies, to bring a contingent and serve under himself in the cause of the Emperor.

Imperial movements in their approach to Leipzig. They devastated the region on their approach.

Arriving near Leipzig two days later, he order John George to supply his army with supplies, aid and victual.

On 8 September, Tilly arrived outside of Leipzig and demanded victuals from the capital of the duchy for his army. The elector was not within his capital of the moment, but the subjects of the elector were more willing to fight for his capital than he was. He devastated the entire region outside of the city, and demanded rations and quarters for his army. He was again refused. Trenches were opened by the Imperials, heavy guns were placed at Pfaffendorf (immediately in the environs of Leipzig) and entrenched a number of heights that had commanding positions on roads approaching the city, in order to exclude relieving forces from the area. Specifically Duben (North-East), which was the direction from which the Swedish might descend on the besieging army. The residents of the town however, had not received instructions from the elector, as his messengers had failed to get through, and on 16 September surrendered the city to Tilly. Four hundred thousand florins were to be paid to the imperials, and the small garrison within Leipzig was allowed to march out of the town with all the honors of war. Having completed the occupation of the city, Tilly received news of the approach of the Swedish and Saxon army from the North.

Immediately to the North, on 10 September the King finally secured the long desired treaty from John George. All defiles were to be open to the King and were to be closed to the imperialists. The King agreed to drive the Emperor's forces from Saxony and stand by the Elector to the last. After concluding this treaty, the King issued orders to concentrate all available forces in the vicinity for a major battle, and to prepare a line of retreat for himself and the allied army should the issue of the battle be problematical for him. Tott had the responsibility of holding the Swedish line of communications should it become necessary to follow their line of advance in the case of a retreat. Additionally, Horn was to issue instructions for the nucleus of a new army to be formed on the Havel, which was to be formed from a contingent promised by the Elector of Brandenburg – the King's brother-in-law. The King then crossed the river with his army. He reached the vicinity of Düben on 15 September, and met with the elector of Saxony and inspected his troops. There were between 16 and 20 thousand troops in the elector's army. They then both returned to the Swedish army and inspected it before holding a council of war. After a number of different plans were discussed, the council determined to bring battle to Tilly – the Elector was particularly eager to rid himself of the rapacious imperial army. The Allied army left on the 16th from Düben to Walkau. On the 17th, the Allied army left Wolkau and after marching an hour and a half, marching in line of battle, they encountered the Imperialist vanguard in the plain in front of Leipzig.

== Battle of Breitenfeld ==
The Battle of Breitenfeld

The battle started in the middle of the day and lasted over six hours. The first two hours consisted of an exchange of artillery fire. This was followed by an Imperial attack with cavalry from both wings to both ends of the Protestant line. The cavalry attack routed the Saxon troops on the Swedish left flank. The imperial army then conducted a general attack to exploit the exposed left flank. The Swedes repositioned their second line to cover the left flank and counterattacked with their cavalry to both imperial flanks. The attack on the Imperial left was led personally by Gustavus Adolphus, capturing the Imperial artillery and enveloping the Imperial left flank. The Swedes now had much greater weight of fire from their artillery, infantry, and the captured Imperial artillery. The Imperial line became disorganized under the heavy fire and was enveloped. The Imperial line collapsed and over 80% of Imperial forces were killed or captured.

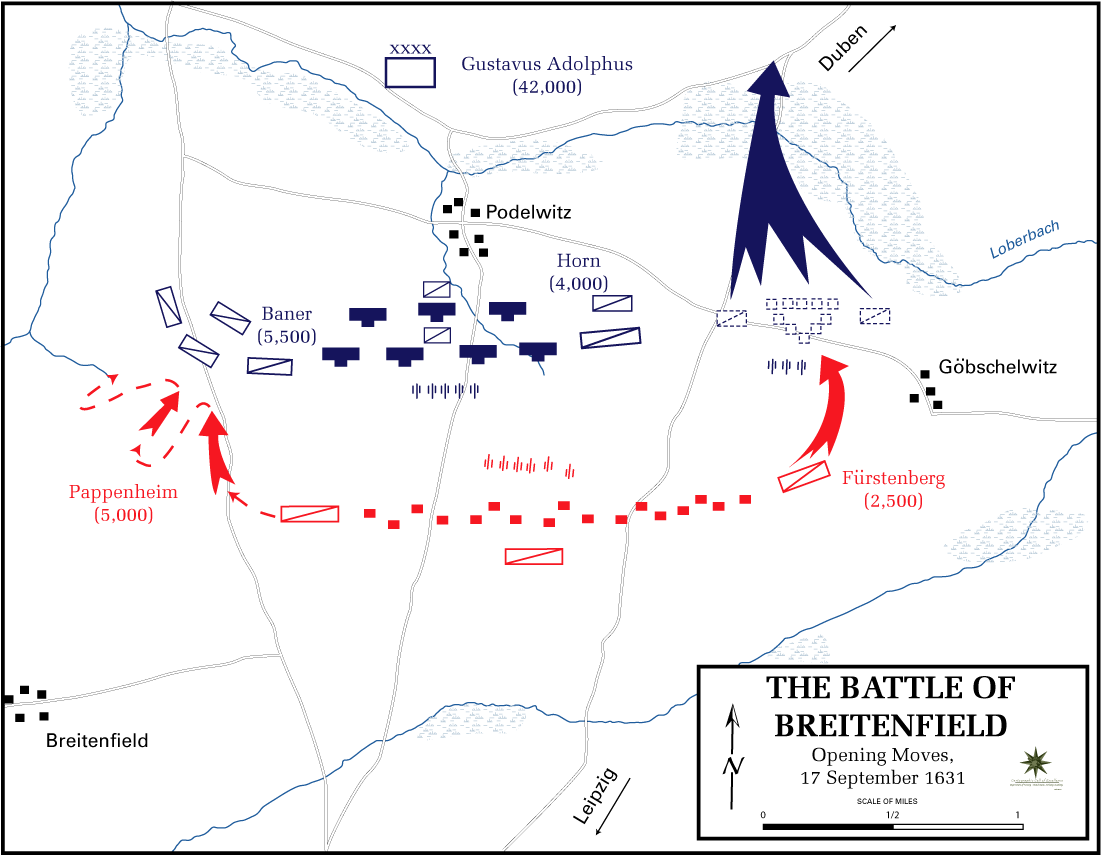
Battle of Breitenfeld – Opening moves, 17 September 1631 Swedish-Saxon forces in Blue Catholic army in Red

The combined Swedish-Saxon forces were to the north of Leipzig centred around hamlet of Podelwitz, facing southwest toward Breitenfeld and Leipzig. The battle began around mid-day, with a two-hour exchange of artillery fire, during which the Swedes demonstrated firepower in a rate of fire of three to five volleys to one Imperial volley. Gustavus had lightened his artillery park, and each colonel had four highly mobile, rapid firing, copper-cast three pounders, the cream of Sweden's metallurgical industry. When the artillery fire ceased, Pappenheim's Black Cuirassiers charged without orders, attempting to turn the Swedish right. Instead, their attack fell between Johan Banér's line and the Swedish reserves. They attacked with a caracole and were driven back, repeating the maneuver six more times to little effect. The small companies of musketeers dispersed between the squadrons of horse fired a salvo at point blank range, disrupting the charge of the Imperialist cuirassier and allowing the Swedish cavalry to counterattack at an advantage. The same tactics worked an hour or so later when the imperial cavalry charged the Swedish left flank. Following the rebuff of the seventh assault, General Banér sallied forth with both his light (Finnish and West Gaetlanders) and heavy cavalry (Smalanders and East Gaetlanders). Banér's cavalry had been taught to deliver its impact with the saber, not to caracole with the hard-to-aim pistols or carbines, forcing Pappenheim and his cavalry quit the field in disarray, retreating 24 kilometres (15 mi) northwest to Halle.

During the charges of the Cuirassiers, Tilly's infantry had remained stationary, but then the cavalry on his right charged the Saxon cavalry and routed it towards Eilenburg. There may have been confusion in the imperial command at seeing Pappenheim's charge; in their assessment of the battle, military historians have wondered if Pappenheim precipitated an attempted double envelopment, or if he followed Tilly's preconceived plan. At any rate, recognizing an opportunity, Tilly sent the majority of his infantry against the remaining Saxon forces in an oblique march diagonally across his front.

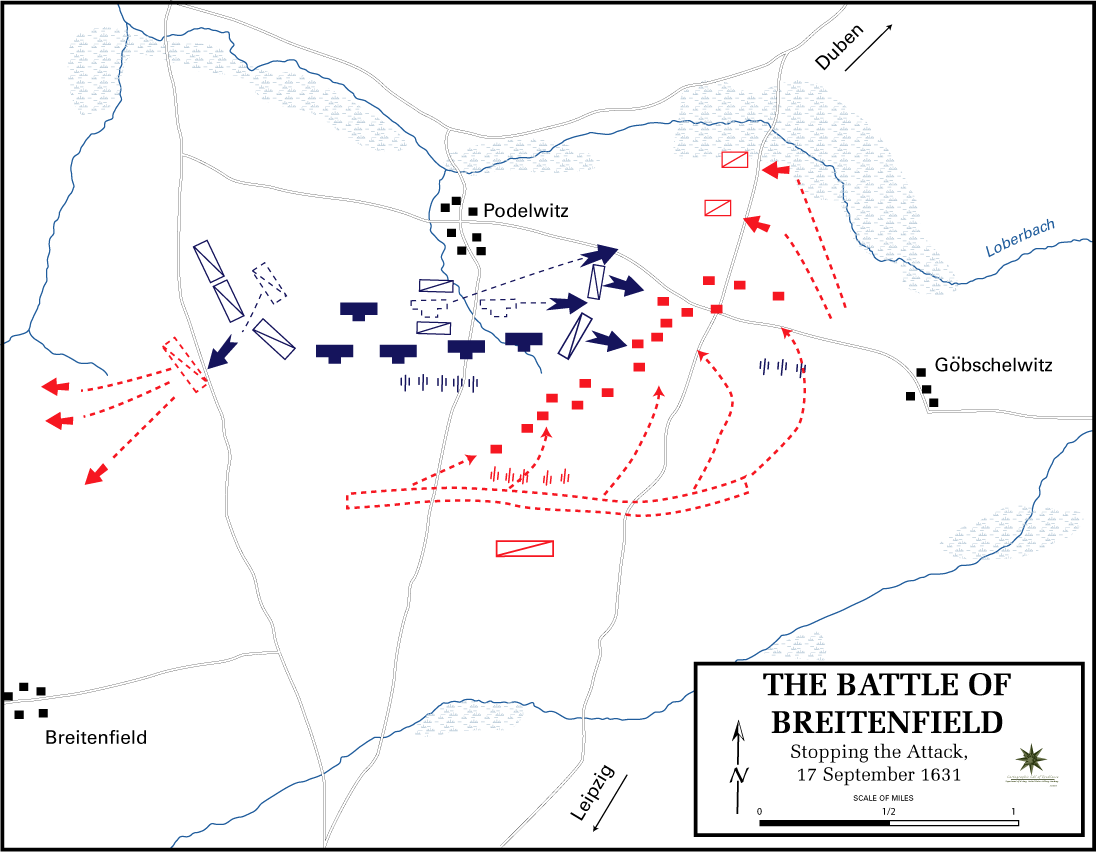
Battle of Breitenfeld – Thwarting the Imperial attack, 17 September 1631 Swedish forces in Blue Catholic army in Red

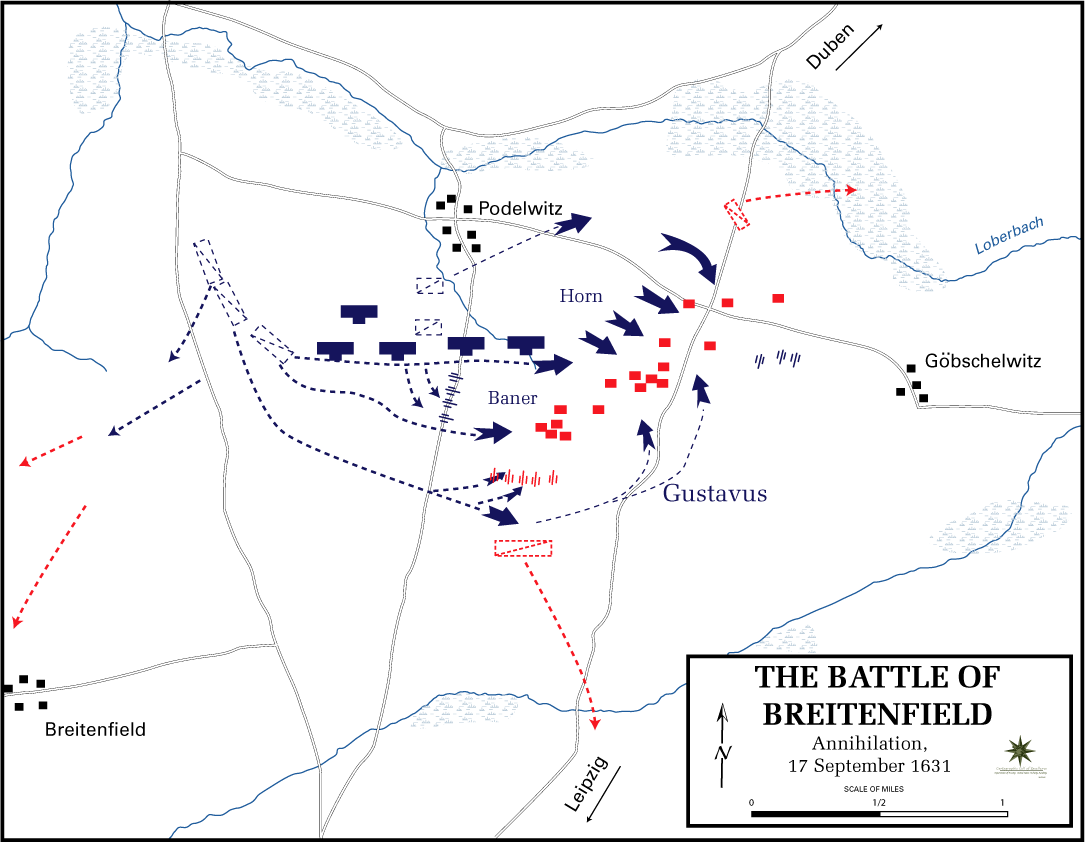
Battle of Breitenfeld – Annihilation, 17 September 1631 Swedish forces in Blue Catholic army in Red

Tilly ordered his infantry to march ahead diagonally to the right, concentrating his forces on the weaker Saxon flank. The entire Saxon force was routed, leaving the Swedish left flank exposed. Its commander, Gustav Horn, refused his line and counter-attacked before the Imperial tercios could regroup and change face towards the Swedes.

With the Imperial forces engaged, the Swedish right and centre pivoted on the refused angle, bringing them in line with Horn. Banér's cavalry, under the direct command of Gustavus Adolphus, attacked across the former front to strike the Imperial right and capture their artillery. As Tilly's men came under fire from their own captured batteries, the Swedish cannon, under Lennart Torstensson, rotated, catching the tercios in a crossfire.

After several hours of punishment, nearing sunset, the Catholic line finally broke. Tilly and Pappenheim were both wounded, though they escaped. 7,600 Imperial soldiers were killed, and 6,000 were captured. The Saxon artillery was recaptured, along with all the Imperial guns and 120 regimental flags. As soon as the battle was clearly won, the King dismounted, and knelt on the battlefield and prayed thanks for victory.

The new military system of the Swedish king had definitively established itself. The thick, unwieldy Spanish tercio system that prevailed for the past two centuries had been overcome by the superior mobility and flexibility of the Swedish formations. Additionally, the importance of infantry had again been established for the first time since the military systems of antiquity. The ability of a disciplined unit of infantry to withstand a charge of cavalry had been clearly established as the result of this battle. Furthermore, smaller more mobile units of artillery that were able to move around a battlefield and train their own cannons (and the enemies) at will was demonstrated.

== The Main ==
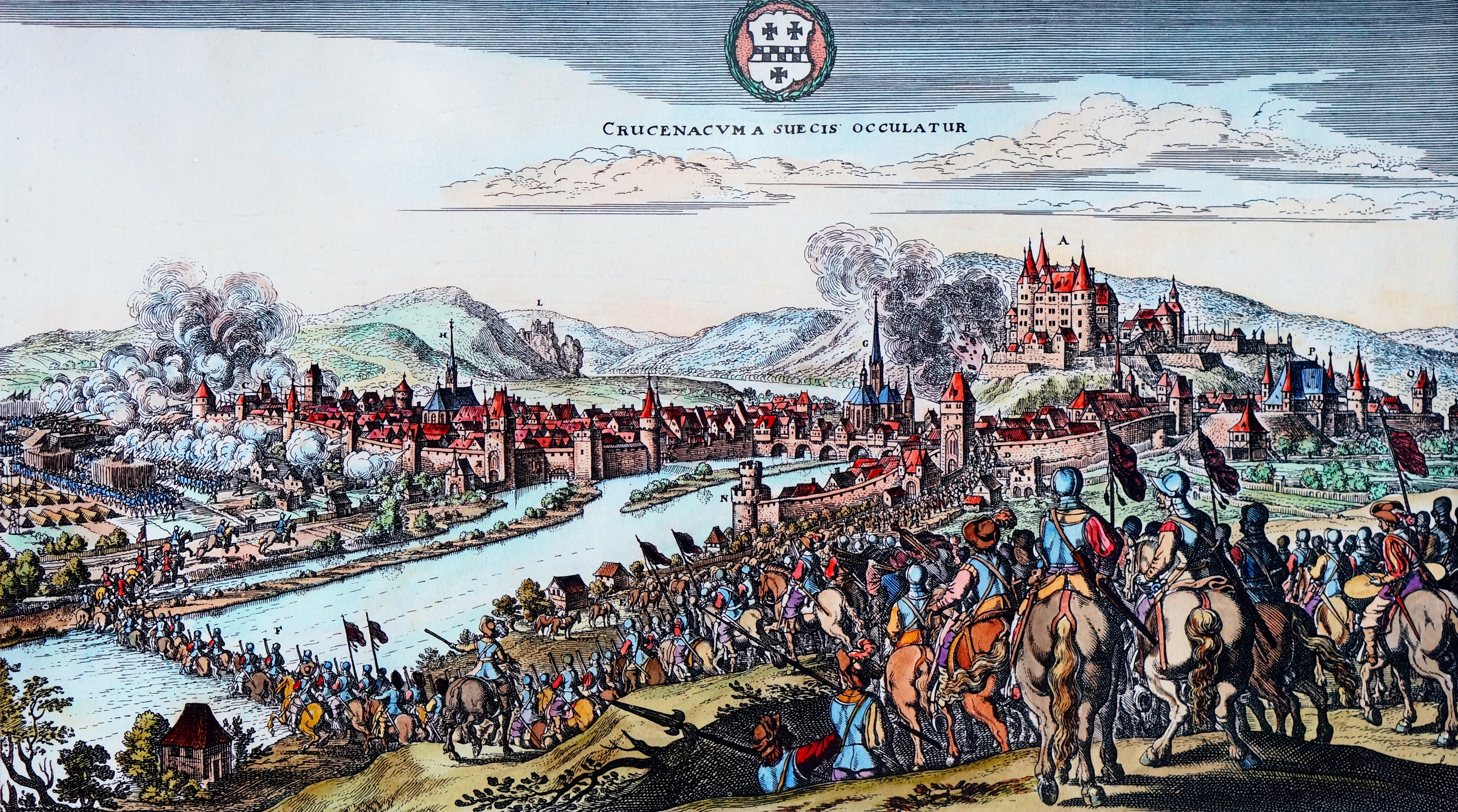
Capture of Kreuznach by Swedish troops in February 1632

In the wake of the Swedish victory, there could be no more reticence to join the Protestant cause for fear of imperial retribution. Gustavus moved through Thuringia and crossed the Rhine and took Mainz and the Palatinate, the Hessians under Peter Melander invaded Münster and Jülich. Another Swedish Army under Horn took Würzburg and Bamberg but was defeated by Tilly at Bamberg. The King who had come out of Scandinavia had proven his ability to successfully fight pitched battles, and take strong places from the Emperor's forces. Since the beginning of the war – almost 12 years past at this point – the Protestants had not been in such a strong position. With the destruction of the Imperial army, which retreated towards the Weser, the entirety of Germany was by and large open to the Swedish army. There were two strategies available to the Protestant army at this point. To march immediately towards the Emperor's hereditary possessions – which were the mainstay of his power – Further, Inner and Austria proper. To attack Vienna, and take the Emperor's capital from him in the hopes that this would bring him to terms on the Danube. Or, he could march to the Main and attack the Catholic Bishoprics there – which would allow him to revictual his army at the enemies expense, and avenge the wrongs that had been done to the Protestants directly. Being in South-Western Germany, he would then be in a position to attack Bavaria – the principle and leading member of the Catholic league – and the Emperor's hereditary possessions also. Although a more conservative plan, in light of the circumstances it was a more prudent one. Although he had won a great victory in the heart of Germany, the electors of Saxony and Brandenburg, his most powerful allies, left much to be desired, and should matters change and the Emperor again gain the morale momentum from some victory, these allies could not be trusted absolutely.

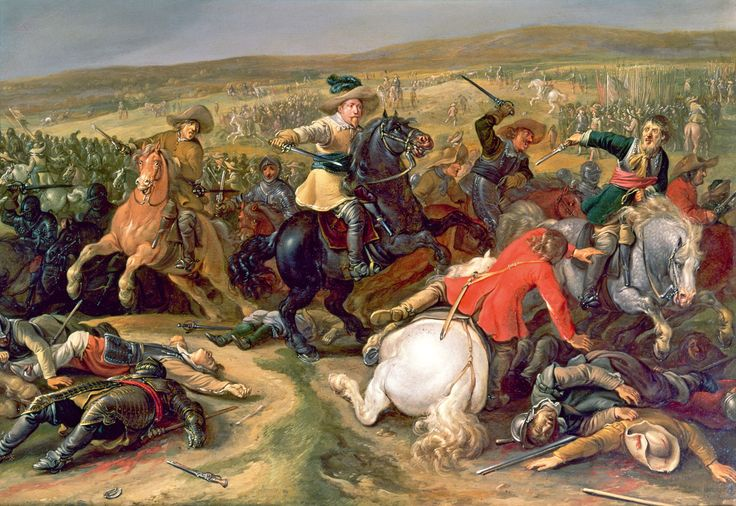
Swedish king Gustavus Adolphus leading a cavalry charge

Most importantly though, the Protestant cause had gained confidence in itself, and the Swedish army was inspired by the victories that had taken place. As a result of this victory, it was rumored that Wallenstein was contemplated uniting with the Swedish King. These discussions were taking place through the English. Several other gains had been made though. The princes in Anhalt were also joining the cause. They negotiated a treaty which promised to; pay three thousand rix dollars a month, build forts and bridges in strategically important places as directed by the Swedish at their own expense, to hold these places for the Protestant cause, to deny the Emperor and the Catholic League access to these places, and to act and obey the directions of the Swedish King. Shortly after the victory, these treaties were negotiated at Halle in addition to a conference. The Elector of Saxony, William of Weimar were present – in addition to many other major princes allied to the cause. At this conference, the march on Vienna was discussed extensively. It was here that the plan was laid out. The King, with the principal army, would march through Thuringia, Franconia and Swabia. From here, the army would march into Bavaria on the exposed Western Flank. Tilly's army was on the weser. The plan to march into South-Western Germany aroused intense arguments. Even Richelieu, the principal financial backer of the Swedish Campaign, was opposed to it.

Gustavus Adolfus began his new campaign into northern Bavaria by attacking the fortress city of Würzburg on the Main. His army conquered the Marienberg fortress in Würzburg on 18 October 1631. The fortress was held by the Swedish and their allies until 1635. Aldolfus also captured Frankfurt am Main and Mainz by winter 1631.

In pursuit of this general scheme, Baner was ordered to leave a garrison in Landsburg, to surrender Frankfort and Crossen to the elector of Brandenburg and to assume command of the Saxon units when they should be in a suitable condition to fight – which their recent precipitous retreat from Breitenfeld revealed to be greatly wanting. His overall orders were to capture Magdeburg, and secure the western front all imperialist forces and to hold it.

== Swedish invasion of Bavaria ==
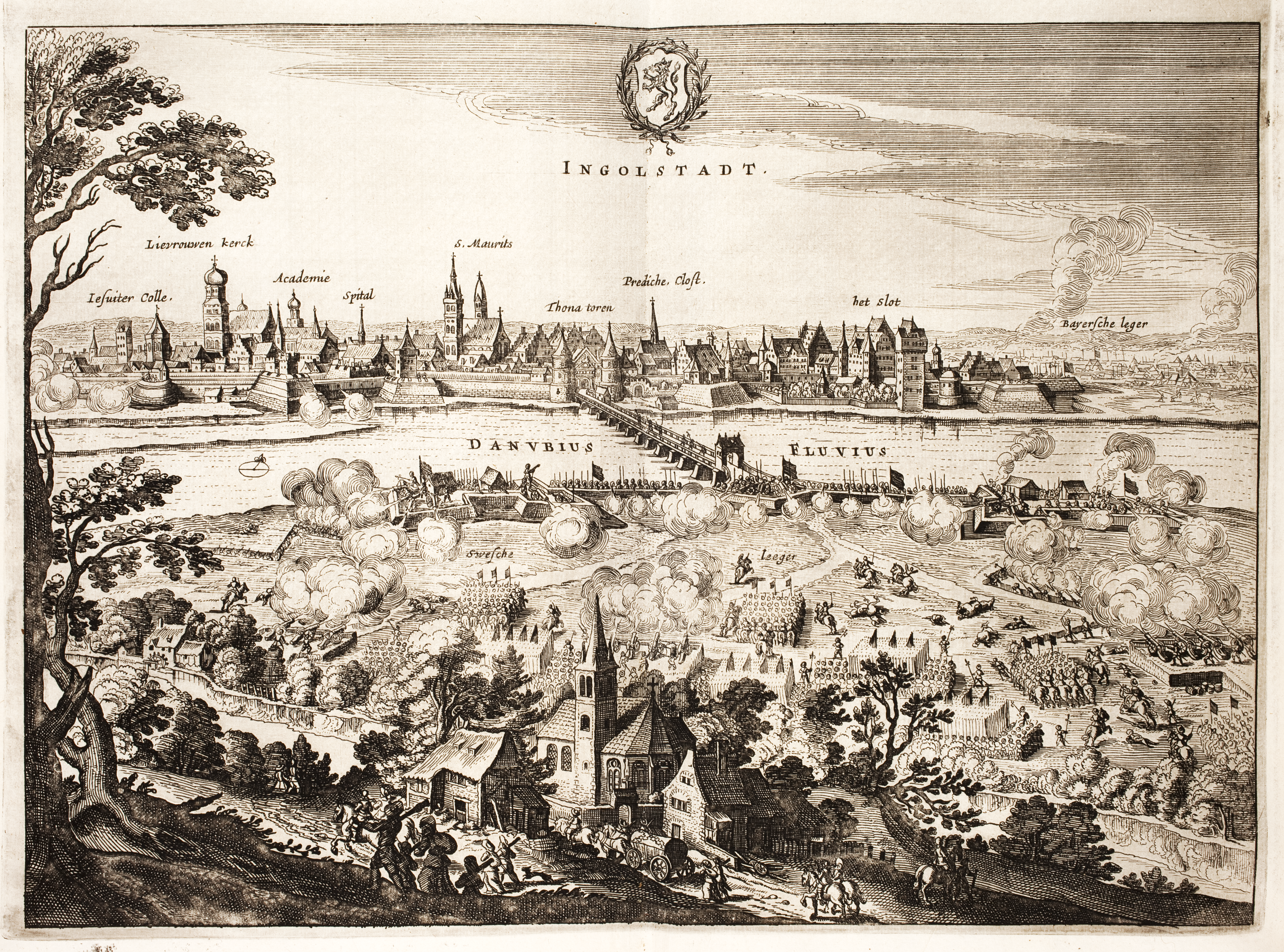
Siege of Ingolstadt with cannonade over the river Danube in 1632

In March 1632 King Gustavus Adolphus of Sweden invaded Bavaria, with an army of Swedish soldiers and German mercenaries.

His next major confrontation was against Count Tilly at the Battle of Rain on the River Lech in April. It was a decisive victory for the Swedes and Count Tilly was mortally wounded. The immediate result of the battle was that Bavaria lay open for occupation by the Swedish army. Adolphus planned to move his forces parallel to the Danube River, moving eastward to capture Neuburg an der Donau and take the fortified cities of Ingolstadt, Regensburg, and Passau – so that the Swedes would have a clear path to threaten Vienna and the Emperor. However these fortified cities on the Danube were too strong for Adolphus to take.

Unable to take the Danube route to Vienna, Adolphus began a swath of destruction deep into southern Bavaria, all the way to the gates of Munich. Larger cities were spared plundering if tribute of large sums of money was given, (such as Munich, Augsburg, Freising and Landshut). However many smaller villages along the way were pillaged and burned. Several Bavarian cities and small towns still have records of their looting or destruction, such as Moosburg, Donauwörth, Indersdorf, Ismaning, Fürstenfeldbruck and Dachau. The Swedes plundered as far south as the monastery in Andechs. as well the Irsee Abbey near Kaufbeuren. Neither army ventured into the Alps.

Many of these towns and villages would succumb to famine and disease about a year later decimating the population of Bavaria all the more. Maximilian I, Elector of Bavaria, by this time had fled from his capital in Munich to the security of Salzburg in the neutral Prince-Archbishopric.

While Adolphus occupied Munich in May, the Holy Roman Emperor Ferdinand II recalled his old military leader Albrecht von Wallenstein back into military service to try to stop Adolphus' rampage of Bavaria. Wallenstein raised a fresh army within a few weeks and marched through northern Bohemia, and then into northern Bavaria to cut off Adolphus' supply line.

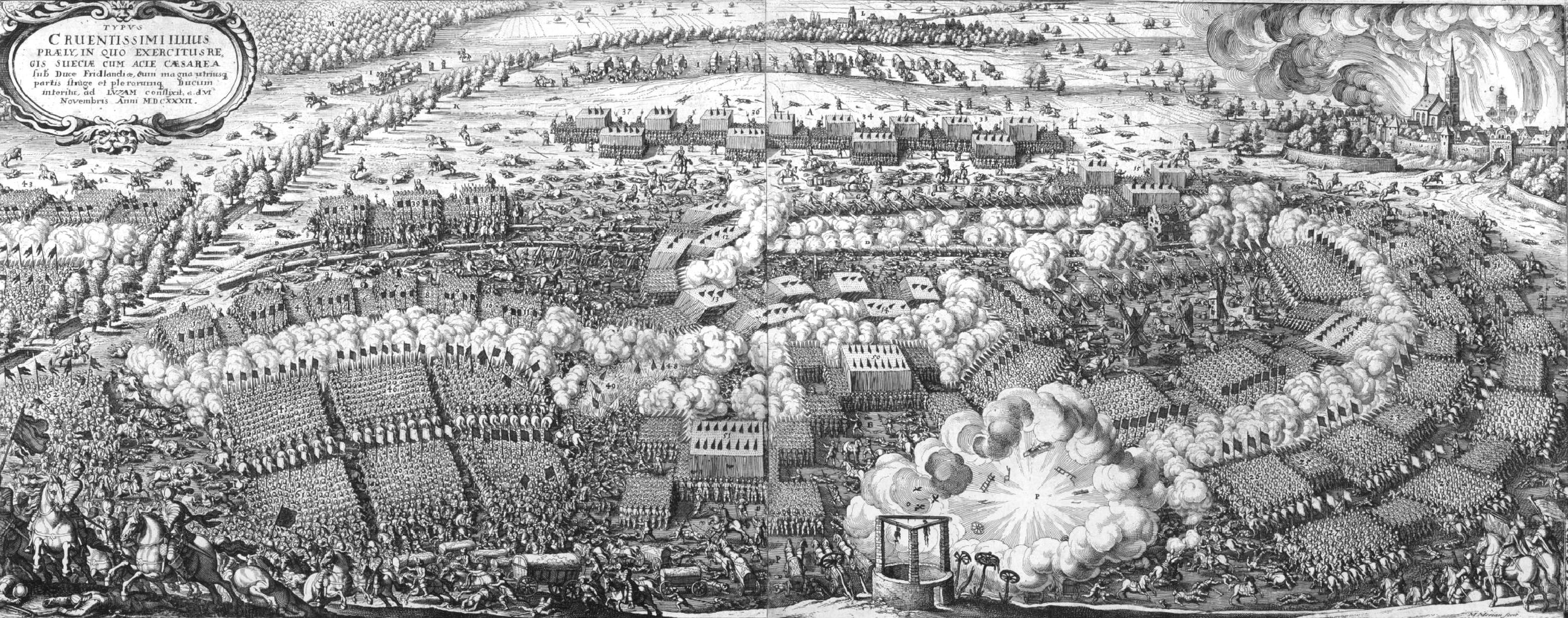
The battle of Lützen. Cornelis Danckerts: Historis oft waerachtich verhael.., 1632. Engraving by Matthäus Merian.

Seeing the danger, Adolphus moved his army north to confront Wallenstein. Discovering that he was outnumbered, Adolphus ordered a tactical retreat into the fortified city of Nuremberg. Wallenstein's army immediately laid siege to the city in an attempt to starve the Swedes out. In a desperate attempt to break the deadlock, Adolphus attacked the entrenchments of Wallenstein's imperial army in the late-August Battle of the Alte Veste (an old fort on a wooded hill near Nuremberg), and the early-September Battle of Fürth, but failed to break through. The siege ended after several weeks when the Swedes broke out of Nuremberg and fled north. Because both sides were suffering from lack of food and from disease, Wallenstein was unable to pursue the retreating Swedes.

In 1632 a Saxon-Swedish army under Hans Georg von Arnim-Boitzenburg destroyed an imperial army at Steinau and captured Silesia. In order to punish Saxony Wallenstein invaded Saxony and destroyed many villages in Saxony. Wallenstein met up with Adolphus once more at the Saxon town of Lützen in November 1632. In a pitched battle, the Swedish army defeated Wallenstein's forces, but King Gustavus Adolphus of Sweden, the 'father of modern warfare', was killed during a confused cavalry charge which he had personally led.

The Swedish Army under Gustavus Adolphus' successors Gustav Horn and Bernard of Saxe-Weimar would return to Bavaria and capture Regensburg the following year in 1633, only to lose it again to Imperial forces in 1634. In 1633 the minor Swedish German allies formed the Heilbronn League but their army was too small. Furthermore, the Swedes transferred Lower Saxony to Brunswick-Lüneburg and its duke George and Westphalia to the Hessians and its landgrave William. In summer of 1633 the Imperial-Westphalian tried to relieve Hameln which was under siege by a Swedish-Hessian-Lüneburg army under George Lüneburg, Dodo zu Knyphausen, and Peter Melander. The imperial under Lother Dietrich Freiherr von Bönninghausen, Jean de Merode, and Lother Dietrich Freiherr von Bönninghausen were defeated at Oldendorf. In late summer of 1633 Wallenstein routed the Swedes at Steinau and a Spanish army under the Duke of Feria defeated a Swedish army under Horn at Konstanz and retook Rheinfelden and relieved Bregenz, Konstanz, and Breisach.

In 1634, the Swedes were forced to fight the combined Austrian and Spanish forces of Ferdinand of Hungary and the Cardinal-Infante Ferdinand assisted by their deputies Gallas and Leganés at the Battle of Nördlingen (Swabian part of Bavaria) in early September 1634, resulting in a crushing defeat that would end the Swedish phase of the war. In 1638 Maximilian I, Elector of Bavaria, erected a golden statue of the Virgin Mary in Munich to celebrate the end of Swedish occupation. The statue exists today in the city center called Marienplatz.

The Swedes would appear one more time in Bavaria in May 1648 combined with the French army to attack the Imperials and Bavarians under Count Holzappel in the Battle of Zusmarshausen near Augsburg. After Holzappel's death and the retreat of his army, the Swedes would devastate Bavaria again, capturing Freising and Landshut on the Isar. They would only start to retreat after unsuccessful assaults on Wasserburg and on the Bavarian defenses at Mühldorf. Their last skirmish was a defeat at Dachau in October 1648 followed by a final Swedish retreat across the Lech and out of Bavaria. The Peace of Westphalia would be signed a few days later, ending the 30-Years-War.

== Swedish strength and matériel ==
Ship name	Ship type	Guns	Launched	Fate
Andromeda	Galleon	44	Early 1600s	Shipwrecked in 1654 or 1655
Caesar	Galleon	54	1648	Captured by Denmark in 1677
Fågel Grip	Pinnace	14	Early 1600s	Shipwrecked in 1639
Gamla Kronan	Galleon	32	1618	Retired in 1643
Göta Ark	Galleon	72	1634	Sunk in 1650
Jupiter	Galleon	50	1633	Sold in 1647
Kalmar Nyckel	Pinnace	14	1625	Sold in 1651
Kronan	Galleon	68	1632	Sunk in 1675
Maria	Galleon	54	1648	Lost in 1677
Mars	Galleon	44	1633	Sunk in 1660
Oldenburg	Galleon	42	1628	Captured from Denmark, 1644
Patientia	Galleon	48	1616	Captured from Denmark, 1644
Scepter	Galleon	66	1636	Sunk in 1675
Tre Lejon	Galleon	46	1642	Captured from Denmark, 1644
Vasa	Galleon	64	1627	Sunk during maiden voyage in 1628
Vestervik	Galleon	44	Early 1647	Burnt in 1676
Äpplet	Galleon	64	1628	Retired in 1658

Battles during the Swedish intervention in the Thirty Years' War
Battle	Swedish numbers	Enemy numbers	Swedish casualties	Enemy casualties	Result
Wolgast	7,500	Unknown	Unknown	Unknown	Swedish Victory
Falkenberg	3,700	3,500	Unknown	Unknown	Swedish victory
Ribnitz	Unknown	Unknown	Unknown	Unknown	Swedish victory
Greifenhagen	14,000	1,500–2,500	Unknown	Unknown	Swedish victory
Marwitz	6,000	9,000	Unknown	Unknown	Swedish victory
Malchin	Unknown	200	Unknown	200	Swedish victory
Demmin	19,000	2,100	Unknown	Unknown	Swedish victory
Landsberg	Unknown	Unknown	Unknown	Unknown	Swedish victory
Frankfurt an der Oder	13,000	6,400	800	1,700	Swedish victory
Magdeburg	2,400	40,000	2,400	1,900	Imperial victory
Burgstall	Unknown	Unknown	Unknown	Unknown	Swedish victory
Werben	15,100	16,200	200	1,000	Swedish victory
1st Breitenfeld	39,000	37,000	5,100	16,000	Swedish victory
Halle	Unknown	Unknown	Unknown	Unknown	Swedish victory
Würzburg	Unknown	Unknown	Unknown	Unknown	Swedish victory
Rhine	Unknown	Unknown	Unknown	Unknown	Swedish victory
Mainz	Unknown	Unknown	Unknown	Unknown	Swedish victory
Bamberg	12,000	22,000	4,000	Unknown	Imperial victory
Rain	37,000	22,000	2,000	3,000	Swedish victory
Ingolstadt	Unknown	Unknown	Unknown	Unknown	Imperial victory
Nuremberg	45,000	50,000	21,000	Unknown	Inconclusive
Wiesloch	Unknown	Unknown	Unknown	Unknown	Swedish victory
First Steinau	21,000	20,000	Light	6,000	Swedish victory
Alte Veste	46,000	40,000	2,500	900	Imperial victory
Fürth	Unknown	Unknown	2,500	2,500	Imperial victory
Benfeld	Unknown	1,040	Unknown	Unknown	Swedish victory
Lützen	19,000	19,000	6,000	5,160	Swedish victory
Oldendorf	13,000	14,700	700	4,000	Swedish victory
Pfaffenhofen	Unknown	Unknown	Unknown	Unknown	Swedish victory
Steinau	Unknown	Unknown	Unknown	Unknown	Imperial victory
Rheinfelden	350	20,000	350	Unknown	Spanish victory
Nördlingen	25,700	33,000	12,000	3,500	Spanish-Imperial victory
Strasbourg Bridge	6,000–7,000	4,500–5,000	300–2,000	Unknown	Imperial victory

== See also ==
- Hakkapeliitta
- Pomerania during the Early Modern Age
- Swedish torch

== Sources ==
- Dodge, Theodore A. (1895) [1996]. Gustavus Adolphus: A history of the art of war from its revival after the Middle Ages to the end of the Spanish Succession War, with a detailed account of the campaigns of the great Swede, and of the most famous campaigns of Turenne, Condé, Eugene and Marlborough. Houghton, Mifflin. ISBN 978-1853672347. OCLC 33899011.
- Ringmar, Erik (2008) [1996]. Identity, Interest and Action: A Cultural Explanation of the Swedish Intervention in the Thirty Years War. Cambridge University Press. ISBN 978-0521026031.
- Harte, Walter (1807) [2002]. The history of Gustavus Adolphus, King of Sweden, surnamed the Great : to which is prefixed an essay on the military state of Europe, containing the manners and customs in the early part of the seventeenth century. Vol. Two vols. printer: Hansard (3rd ed.). Stockdale.
- Helmolt, Hans Ferdinand (1903) [2007]. The World's History: Western Europe to 1800. The World's History: A Survey of Man's Record. Vol. 7. Heinemann. p. 573. ISBN 978-0217965668. Archived from the original on 17 April 2023.
- Liptai, Ervin; Tóth, Sándor (1985). Magyarország hadtörténete [Military history of Hungary] (in Hungarian). Zrínyi Katonai Kiadó (Zrínyi Military Publisher). ISBN 978-9633263327. Archived from the original on 17 April 2023.
- Markó, László (2006). A magyar állam főméltóságai Szent Istvántól napjainkig: Életrajzi Lexikon [Great Officers of State in Hungary from King Saint Stephen to Our Days: A Biographical Encyclopedia] (in Hungarian) (2nd ed.). Magyar Könyvklub. ISBN 978-9635470853.
- Oakley, Stewart P. (1992). War and peace in the Baltic, 1560-1790. Routledge. ISBN 978-0415024723.
- Schmidt, Burghart; Richefort, Isabelle (2006). Les relations entre la France et les villes hanséatiques de Hambourg, Brême et Lübeck (Moyen-Âge – XIXe siècle) (in French). P.I.E. Peter Lang. ISBN 978-9052012865.
- Stevens, John L. (1884) [2012]. History of Gustavus Adolphus. New York: Putnam's Sons. ISBN 978-1273068119. Archived from the original on 17 June 2016 – via Questia.
- Jones, Archer (1987). The Art of War in the Western World. New York: Oxford University Press. ISBN 978-0-252-01380-5.
- Jones, Archer (2001). The Art of War in the Western World. Urbana: University of Illinois Press. ISBN 978-0-252-06966-6.
- Meade, James Edward (1976). Principles of Political Economy: Just Economy. Vol. 4. Albany, N.Y: State University of New York Press. ISBN 978-0-87395-205-7. Archived from the original on 17 April 2023.
- Parker, Geoffrey (1997). The Thirty Years' War (2nd ed.). New York: Routledge. ISBN 978-0-415-12883-4. Archived from the original on 17 April 2023.
- Doughty, Robert A. (1996). Warfare in the Western World: Military Operations from 1600 to 1871. Lexington, Mass: D.C. Heath. ISBN 978-0-669-20939-6.
