= List of battles of the Thirty Years' War =

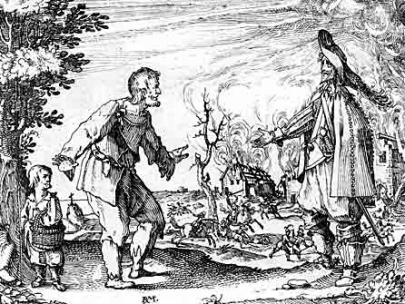
A farmer begs for mercy in front of a burning farm during the Thirty Years' War.

List of battles and sieges of the Thirty Years' War, a series of armed conflicts that occurred in Europe from 1618 to 1648:

== Battles ==
Battles of the Thirty Years' War
Battle	Image	Anti-Habsburg Belligerents	Pro-Habsburg Belligerents	Dates	Location	Phase	Result
Battle of Čáslavi		(Kingdom of Bohemia) Bohemia	(Habsburg monarchy) Habsburg Monarchy	September 14-16, 1618	Horky, Potěhy, and Bratčice, Bohemia	Bohemian Revolt	Bohemian Victory
Battle of Pelhřimova		(Kingdom of Bohemia) Bohemia	(Habsburg monarchy) Habsburg Monarchy	October 18, 1618	Pelhřimov, Bohemia	Bohemian Revolt	Bohemian Victory
Battle of Lomnice		(Kingdom of Bohemia) Bohemia	(Habsburg monarchy) Habsburg Monarchy	November 9, 1618	Lomnice nad Lužnicí, Bohemia	Bohemian Revolt	Bohemian Vicory
Battle of Sablat		(Kingdom of Bohemia) Bohemia	(Habsburg monarchy) Habsburg Monarchy	June 10, 1619	Dříteň, Bohemia	Bohemian Revolt	Habsburg Victory
Battle of Wisternitz		(Kingdom of Bohemia) Bohemia	(Habsburg monarchy) Habsburg Monarchy	August 5, 1619	Dolní Věstonice, Moravia	Bohemian Revolt	Bohemian Victory
Battle of Humenné		Principality of Transylvania	Lisowczyks (Holy Roman Empire) Habsburg Monarchy; Habsburg Hungary	November 22-23, 1619	Humenné, Habsburg Hungary	Gabor Bethlen's Revolt	Polish-Habsburg Victory
Battle of Sitzendorf		(Kingdom of Bohemia) Bohemia	(Habsburg monarchy) Habsburg Monarchy	April 13, 1620	Sitzendorf an der Schmida, Lower Austria	Bohemian Revolt	Habsburg Victory
Battle of Hadersdorf am Kamp		(Kingdom of Bohemia) Bohemia; Pro-Bethlen Hungary	(Habsburg monarchy) Habsburg Monarchy	June 10, 1620	Hadersdorf am Kamp, Lower Austria	Bohemian Revolt	Habsburg Victory
Battle of Starý Smolivec		(Kingdom of Bohemia) Bohemia	(Habsburg monarchy) Habsburg Monarchy; Catholic League	October 6, 1620	Radošice and Starý Smolivec, Bohemia	Bohemian Revolt	Habsburg Victory
Battle of Rakovník		(Kingdom of Bohemia) Bohemia	(Habsburg monarchy) Habsburg Monarchy; Catholic League	October 27-November 6, 1620	Rakovník, Bohemia	Bohemian Revolt	Inconclusive
Battle of White Mountain		Bohemia; Electoral Palatinate; Saxe-Weimar	(Habsburg monarchy) Habsburg Monarchy; Catholic League; Spanish Empire	November 8, 1620	White Mountain, Bohemia	Bohemian Revolt	Liga-Spanish-Habsburg Victory
Battle of Loket		(Kingdom of Bohemia) Bohemia	(Habsburg monarchy) Habsburg Monarchy; Catholic League; Saxony	April-May 7, 1621	Loket, Bohemia	Bohemian Revolt	Habsburg-Liga-Saxon
Battle of Rozvadova		Electoral Palatinate	(Habsburg monarchy) Habsburg Monarchy; Catholic League; Spanish Empire	July 16, 1621	Between Rozvadov and Waidhaus, Bohemia and Electoral Palatinate	Bohemian Revolt	Inconclusive
Battle of Neu Titschein		(Kingdom of Bohemia) Bohemia	Catholic League; Spanish Empire	July 25, 1621	Nový Jičín, Moravia	Bohemian Revolt	Bohemian Victory
Battle of Kirdorf		Electoral Palatinate; Brunswick-Lüneburg	Catholic League	December 20, 1621	Kirdorf, Free City of Frankfurt	Palatinate campaign	Liga Victory
Battle of Tyrnau		Principality of Transylvania	(Holy Roman Empire) Habsburg Monarchy; Habsburg Hungary	October 5, 1621	Trnava, Habsburg Hungary	Gabor Bethlen's Revolt	Transylvanian Victory
Battle of Mingolsheim		Electoral Palatinate (Grand Duchy of Baden) Baden-Durlach	Catholic League (Holy Roman Empire) Habsburg Monarchy	April 27, 1622	Wiesloch, Electoral Palatinate	Palatinate campaign	Palatine-Baden Victory
Battle of Wimpfen		Electoral Palatinate (Grand Duchy of Baden) Baden-Durlach	Catholic League (Holy Roman Empire) Habsburg Monarchy; Spanish Empire	May 6, 1622	Bad Wimpfen, Free City of Wimpfen	Palatinate campaign	Habsburg-Liga-Spanish Victory
Battle of Höchst		Electoral Palatinate; Brunswick-Lüneburg	Catholic League (Holy Roman Empire) Habsburg Monarchy; Spanish Empire	June 20, 1622	Höchst, Archbishopric of Mainz	Palatinate campaign	Liga Victory
Battle of Fleurus		Dutch Republic; Mansfeld's Mercenaries	Spanish Empire	August 29, 1622	Fleurus, Spanish Netherlands	Palatinate campaign	Spanish victory
Battle of Reiffenhausen		Electoral Palatinate; Brunswick-Lüneburg	(Holy Roman Empire) Habsburg Monarchy	July 6, 1623	Reiffenhausen, Brunswick-Wolfenbüttel	Palatinate campaign	Brunswick-Palatine Victory
Battle of Stadtlohn		Electoral Palatinate; Brunswick-Lüneburg	Catholic League (Holy Roman Empire) Habsburg Monarchy	August 6, 1623	Stadtlohn, Münster	Palatinate campaign	Liga Victory
Battle of Verceia		France; Venice	Holy Roman Empire; Spanish Empire	September 21, 1625	Verceia, Three Leagues	Valtellina War	Imperial-Spanish Victory
Battle of Dessau Bridge		Denmark-Norway	Holy Roman Empire	April 25, 1626	Dessau, Anhalt-Dessau	Danish intervention	Imperial Victory
Battle of Peuerbach		(Upper Austria) Austrian Peasants	Holy Roman Empire; Bavaria	May 21, 1626	Peuerbach, Upper Austria	Upper Austrian revolt	Peasant Victory
Battle of Linz (1626)		(Upper Austria) Austrian Peasants	Holy Roman Empire; Bavaria	July-August, 1626	Linz, Upper Austria	Upper Austrian revolt	Imperial-Bavarian Victory
Battle of Lutter		Denmark-Norway	Holy Roman Empire; Catholic League	August 17, 1626	Lutter am Barenberge, Brunswick-Wolfenbüttel	Danish intervention	Imperial-Liga Victory
Battle of Vöcklabruch		(Upper Austria) Austrian Peasants	Holy Roman Empire; Bavaria	November 17, 1626	Vöcklabruck, Upper Austria	Upper Austrian revolt	Imperial-Bavarian Victory
Battle of Pont du Feneau		England	(Kingdom of France) France	November 8, 1627	Bridge of Feneau, France	Anglo-French War (1627–1629)	French Victory
Battle of Wolgast		Denmark-Norway; Mackay's Regiment	Holy Roman Empire	September 2, 1628	Wolgast, Pomerania	Danish intervention	Imperial Victory
Battle of Trzciana		(yes) Swedish Empire	Polish-Lithuanian Commonwealth; Holy Roman Empire	June 25, 1629	Trzciano, Royal Prussia	Polish-Swedish War (1626-1629)	Imperial-Polish Victory
Battle of IJsseloord		Dutch Republic	Spanish Empire	July 24, 1629	IJsseloord, Dutch Republic	Eighty Years' War, 1621–1648	Spanish Victory
Battle of Villabuona		France; Venice	Holy Roman Empire	May 29, 1630	Villabona, Mantua	War of the Mantuan Succession	Imperial Victory
Battle of Veillane		France	Spain; Savoy	July 10, 1626	Avigliana, Savoy	War of the Mantuan Succession	French Victory
Battle of Falkenberg		(yes) Swedish Empire	Holy Roman Empire	November 13, 1630	Falkenberg, Pomerania	Swedish intervention	Swedish Victory
Battle of Marwitz		(yes) Swedish Empire	Holy Roman Empire	December 26, 1630	Greifenhagen, Pomerania	Swedish intervention	Swedish Victory
Battle of Frankfurt an der Oder		(yes) Swedish Empire	Holy Roman Empire	April 13, 1631	Frankfurt an der Oder, Brandenburg-Prussia	Swedish intervention	Swedish Victory
Battle of Burgstall, Angern and Reindorff		(yes) Swedish Empire	Holy Roman Empire; Catholic League	July 17, 1631	Burgstall, Angern, and Reindorff, Brandenburg-Prussia	Swedish intervention	Swedish Victory
Battle of Werben		(yes) Swedish Empire	Holy Roman Empire; Catholic League	August 7, 1631	Werben, Brandenburg-Prussia	Swedish intervention	Swedish Victory
Battle of Breitenfeld (1631)		(yes) Swedish Empire	Holy Roman Empire; Catholic League	September 17, 1631	Breitenfeld, Electorate of Saxony	Swedish intervention	Swedish Victory
Battle of Bamberg		(yes) Swedish Empire	Catholic League	March 9, 1632	Bamberg, Prince-Bishopric of Bamberg	Swedish intervention	Imperial Victory
Battle of Rain		(yes) Swedish Empire; Saxe-Weimar	Catholic League; Holy Roman Empire	April 15, 1632	Rain, Bavaria	Swedish intervention	Swedish Victory
Battle of Wiesloch (1632)		(yes) Swedish Empire	Holy Roman Empire	August 16, 1632	Wiesloch, Electoral Palatinate	Swedish intervention	Swedish Victory
First Battle of Steinau		(yes) Swedish Empire; Saxony; Brandenburg	Holy Roman Empire	August 29- September 4, 1632	Steinau, Habsburg Silesia	Swedish intervention	Swedish Victory
Battle of the Alte Veste		(yes) Swedish Empire	Holy Roman Empire; Catholic League	September 3-4, 1632	Alte Veste, Free Imperial City of Nuremberg	Swedish intervention	Imperial Victory
Battle of Lützen (1632)		Swedish Empire; Saxony; Hesse-Kassel	Holy Roman Empire; Catholic League	November 16, 1632	Lützen, Saxony	Swedish intervention	Swedish Victory
Battle of Oldendorf		(yes) Swedish Empire; Brunswick-Lüneburg; Hesse-Kassel	Holy Roman Empire	July 8, 1633	Hessisch Oldendorf, Schaumburg	Swedish intervention	Swedish-Hessian-Brunswick Victory
Battle of Pfaffenhofen (1633)		(yes) Swedish Empire; Electoral Palatinate	Lorraine; Holy Roman Empire; Catholic League	August 1, 1633	Pfaffenhofen an der Ilm, Bavaria	Swedish intervention	Swedish-Palatinate Victory
Battle of Schweidnitz (1633)		Saxony (yes) Swedish Empire; Brandenburg	Holy Roman Empire	August 22, 1633	Schweidnitz, Habsburg Silesia	Swedish intervention	Swedish-Saxon-Brandenburger Victory
Second Battle of Steinau		(yes) Swedish Empire; Saxony (Bohemia) Bohemian Exiles	Holy Roman Empire	October 11, 1633	Steinau, Habsburg Silesia	Swedish intervention	Imperial Victory
Battle of Wattweiller		(yes) Swedish Empire	Lorraine; Holy Roman Empire	March 2, 1634	Cernay, Sundgau	Swedish intervention	Swedish Victory
Battle of Landshut (1634)		(yes) Swedish Empire	Catholic League	July 22, 1634	Landshut, Bavaria	Swedish intervention	Swedish Victory
Battle of Liegnitz (1634)		Saxony	Holy Roman Empire	May 13, 1634	Liegnitz, Habsburg Silesia	Swedish intervention	Saxon Victory
Battle of Nördlingen (1634)		(yes) Swedish Empire; Heilbronn League	Spanish Empire; Holy Roman Empire; Catholic League	September 5-6, 1634	Nördlingen, Free Imperial City of Nördlingen	Swedish intervention	Spanish-Imperial-Liga Victory
Battle of Strasbourg Bridge		(yes) Swedish Empire; Heilbronn League	Holy Roman Empire; Catholic League; Lorraine	September 27-28, 1634	Kehl, Baden	Swedish intervention	Imperial-Liga-Lorriane Victory
Battle of Les Avins		France	Spanish Empire	May 20, 1635	Les Avins, Spanish Netherlands	Franco-Spanish War (1635–1659)	French Victory
Battle of Lüdershausen		(yes) Swedish Empire	Holy Roman Empire	October 19, 1635	Lüder, Brunswick-Lüneburg	Franco-Swedish intervention	Swedish Victory
Battle of Dömitz		(yes) Swedish Empire	Saxony	October 22, 1635	Dömitz, Mecklenburg-Güstrow	Franco-Swedish intervention	Swedish Victory
Battle of Haselünne		(yes) Swedish Empire	Holy Roman Empire	January 11, 1636	Haselünne, Münster	Franco-Swedish intervention	Swedish Victory
Battle of the Lérins Islands (1635)		France	Spanish Empire	13-15 September, 1635	Lérins Islands, France	Franco-Spanish War (1635–1659)	Spanish victory
Battle of Raon		France	Holy Roman Empire; Lorraine	March 9, 1636	Raon-l'Étape, Lorraine	Franco-Swedish intervention	French Victory
Battle of Ray-sur-Saône		France; Weimar Army	Spanish Empire; Franche-Comté	June 22, 1637	Ray-sur-Saône, Franche-Comté	Franco-Swedish intervention	French Victory
Battle of Tornavento		France; Savoy	Spanish Empire	June 22, 1636	Tornavento, Milan	Franco-Spanish War (1635–1659)	Disputed
Battle of Wittstock		(yes) Swedish Empire	Saxony; Holy Roman Empire	October 4, 1636	Wittstock, Brandenburg-Prussia	Franco-Swedish intervention	Swedish Victory
Battle of Sainte-Agnès (1637)		France	Spanish Empire; Franche-Comté; Lorraine	April 1-2, 1637	Sainte-Agnès, Franche-Comté	Ten Years' War	Inconclusive
Battle of Martignat		France	Franche-Comté	February 3-14, 1637	Martignat, Franche-Comté	Ten Years' War	Burgundian Victory
Battle of Savigny		France	Franche-Comté; Spanish Empire	February 8-9, 1637	Savigny-en-Revermont, Franche-Comté	Ten Years' War	Burgundian Victory
Battle of Cornod		France	Franche-Comté	March 13, 1637	Cornod, Franche-Comté	Ten Years' War	French Victory
Battle of the Lérins Islands (1637)		France	Spanish Empire	March 24-May 13, 1637	Lérins Islands, France	Franco-Spanish War (1635–1659)	French Victory
Battle of Rheinfelden		France; Bernhardines	Holy Roman Empire; Bavaria	1st Battle: February 28; 2nd Battle: March 3, 1638	Rheinfelden, Württemberg	Franco-Swedish intervention	Franco-Weimaran Victory
Battle of Kallo		Dutch Republic	Spanish Empire	June 20-21, 1638	Kallo, Spanish Netherlands	Eighty Years' War, 1621–1648	Spanish Victory
Battle of Wittenweiher		France; Bernhardines	Holy Roman Empire; Bavaria	August 9, 1638	Schwanau, Württemberg	Franco-Swedish intervention	Franco-Weimaran Victory
Battle of Getaria		France	Spanish Empire	August 22, 1638	Getaria, Bay of Biscay	Franco-Spanish War (1635–1659)	French Victory
Battle of Vado		France	Spanish Empire	September 1, 1638	Gulf of Vado, off Genoa	Franco-Spanish War (1635–1659)	French Victory
Battle of Thann (1638)		France; Bernhardines	Holy Roman Empire; Lorraine	October 15, 1638	Thann, Further Austria	Franco-Swedish intervention	Franco-Weimaran Victory
Battle of Poligny (1638)		France	Franche-Comté; Holy Roman Empire; Lorraine	June 19, 1638	Poligny, Franche-Comté	Ten Years' War	Burgundian-Lorraine-Imperial Victory
Battle of Vlotho		Electoral Palatinate; England; Swedish Empire	Holy Roman Empire	October 17, 1638	Vlotho, County of Ravensberg	Franco-Swedish intervention	Imperial Victory
Battle of Chemnitz		(yes) Swedish Empire	Saxony; Holy Roman Empire	April 14, 1639	Chemnitz, Saxony	Franco-Swedish intervention	Swedish Victory
Battle of Melnik		(yes) Swedish Empire	Bohemia	May 29, 1639	Mělník, Bohemia	Franco-Swedish intervention	Swedish Victory
Battle of the Downs		Dutch Republic	Spanish Empire; Portugal	October 21, 1639	The Downs, English Channel	Eighty Years' War, 1621–1648 and Dutch-Portuguese War	Dutch Victory
Battle of Riebelsdorfer Hill		France; Weimar Army; Ziegenhainer	Holy Roman Empire	November 15, 1640	Ziegenhainer, Hesse-Kassel	Franco-Swedish intervention	Weimaran-French-Ziegenhainer Victory
Battle of Cambrils		Principality of Catalonia	Spanish Empire	December 13–16, 1640	Cambrils, Principality of Catalonia	Reapers' War	Spanish Victory
Battle of Martorell (1641)		Principality of Catalonia	Spanish Empire	January 20-23, 1641	Martorell, Catalonia	Reapers' War	Spanish Victory
Battle of Montjuïc (1641)		Principality of Catalonia; France	Spanish Empire	January 26, 1641	Montjuïc, Principality of Catalonia	Reapers' War	Franco-Catalan Victory
Battle of Stříbra		(yes) Swedish Empire	Holy Roman Empire; Bohemia	March 23, 1641	Stříbro, Bohemia	Franco-Swedish intervention	Swedish Victory
Battle of Plauen		(yes) Swedish Empire	Holy Roman Empire	April, 1640	Plauen, Saxony	Franco-Swedish intervention	Imperial Victory
Battle of Preßnitz		(yes) Swedish Empire	Holy Roman Empire	March 27, 1641	Preßnitz, Bohemia	Franco-Swedish intervention	Imperial Victory
Battle of La Marfée		France	Spanish Empire; Holy Roman Empire (Kingdom of France) French rebels Principality of Sedan	July 6, 1641	La Marfée, Sedan	Franco-Spanish War (1635–1659)	Spanish-Rebel-Imperial Victory
Battle of Wolfenbüttel		(yes) Swedish Empire; France; Brunswick-Lüneburg; Bernhardines (Note: In French service.)	Holy Roman Empire; Bavaria	June 29, 1641	Wolfenbüttel, Brunswick-Wolfenbüttel	Franco-Swedish intervention	Franco-Lüneburg-Swedish Victory
Battle of Kempen		France; Hesse-Kassel	Holy Roman Empire	January 17, 1642	Kempen, Cologne	Franco-Swedish intervention	Franco-Hessian Victory
Battle of Montmeló		Principality of Catalonia; France	Spanish Empire	March 28, 1642	Montmeló, Principality of Catalonia	Reapers' War	Franco-Catalan Victory
Battle of Honnecourt		France	Spanish Empire	May 26, 1642	Honnecourt-sur-Escaut, Spanish Netherlands	Franco-Spanish War (1635–1659)	Spanish Victory
Battle of Schweidnitz		(yes) Swedish Empire	Holy Roman Empire; Saxony	May 31, 1642	Schweidnitz, Habsburg Silesia	Franco-Swedish intervention	Swedish Victory
Battle of Lleida (1642)		Principality of Catalonia; France	Spanish Empire	October 7, 1642	Lleida, Principality of Catalonia	Reapers' War	Franco-Catalan Victory
Battle of Breitenfeld (1642)		(yes) Swedish Empire	Holy Roman Empire; Saxony	November 2, 1642	Breitenfeld, Saxony	Franco-Swedish intervention	Swedish Victory
Battle of Rocroi		France	Spanish Empire	May 19, 1643	Rocroi, France	Franco-Spanish War (1635–1659)	French Victory
Battle of Tuttlingen		France; Bernhardines (Note: In French service.)	Holy Roman Empire (Electorate of Bavaria) Bavaria (Spain) Spanish Empire; Lorraine	November 24-25, 1643	Tuttlingen, Württemberg	Franco-Swedish intervention	Imperial-Bavarian-Spanish-Lorraine Victory
Battle of Kolding (1644)		(yes) Swedish Empire	Denmark-Norway	January 9, 1644	Kolding, Denmark-Norway	Torstenson War	Swedish Victory
Battle of Brunflo		(yes) Swedish Empire	Denmark-Norway	March 11, 1644	Brunflo, Denmark-Norway	Torstenson War	Swedish Victory
Battle of Borst		(yes) Swedish Empire	Denmark-Norway	March 25, 1644	Borstbäcken, Denmark-Norway	Torstenson War	Swedish Victory
Battle of Freiburg		France	(Electorate of Bavaria) Bavaria	August 3-9, 1644	Freiburg im Breisgau, Further Austria	Franco-Swedish intervention	
Battle of Jüterbog		(yes) Swedish Empire	Holy Roman Empire	December 3, 1644	Jüterbog, Archbishopric of Magdeburg	Franco-Swedish intervention	Swedish Victory
Battle of Morast Sconce		(yes) Swedish Empire	Denmark-Norway	November 18, 1644	Morast sconce, Swedish Empire	Torstenson War	Norwegian Victory
Battle of Bysjön		(yes) Swedish Empire	Denmark-Norway	December 22, 1644	Lake Bysjön, Swedish Empire	Torstenson War	Norwegian Victory
Battle of Jankau		(yes) Swedish Empire	Holy Roman Empire; Bavaria; Saxony	March 6, 1645	Jankov, Bohemia	Franco-Swedish intervention	Swedish Victory
Battle of Herbsthausen		France	(Electorate of Bavaria) Bavaria	May 5, 1645	Bad Mergentheim, Franconian Circle	Franco-Swedish intervention	Bavarian Victory
Battle of Alerheim		France; Hesse-Kassel	(Electorate of Bavaria) Bavaria; Holy Roman Empire (Electorate of Cologne) Westphalia	August 3, 1645	Alerheim, Free Imperial City of Nördlingen	Franco-Swedish intervention	Franco-Hessian Victory
Battle of Dvůr Králové (1646)		(yes) Swedish Empire	Holy Roman Empire	October 2, 1646	Dvůr Králové nad Labem, Bohemia	Franco-Swedish intervention	Swedish Victory
Battle of Totenhöhe		(yes) Swedish Empire; Hesse-Kassel	Hesse-Darmstadt; Holy Roman Empire	November 20, 1646	Frankenberg, Hesse-Darmstadt	Franco-Swedish intervention	Hessian-Swedish Victory
Battle of Triebl		(yes) Swedish Empire	Holy Roman Empire	August 22, 1647	Černošín, Bohemia	Franco-Swedish intervention	Imperial Victory
Battle of Zusmarshausen		(yes) Swedish Empire; France	Holy Roman Empire; Bavaria	May 17, 1648	Zusmarshausen, Augsburg	Franco-Swedish intervention	Franco-Swedish Victory
Battle of Wevelinghoven		Hesse-Kassel	Holy Roman Empire	June 14, 1648	Grevenbroich, Palatinate-Neuburg	Franco-Swedish intervention	Hessian Victory
Battle of Lens		France	Spanish Empire	August 20, 1648	Between Grenay and Liévin, Spanish Netherlands	Franco-Spanish War (1635–1659)	French Victory
Battle of Dachau		(yes) Swedish Empire; France	Holy Roman Empire; Bavaria	October 5, 1648	Dachau, Bavaria	Franco-Swedish intervention	Imperial-Bavarian Victory
Battle of Prague (1648)		(yes) Swedish Empire	Bohemia	July 25–November 1 1648	Prague, Bohemia	Franco-Swedish intervention	Inconclusive

== Sieges ==
Battles of the Thirty Years' War
Battle	Image	Anti-Habsburg Belligerents	Pro-Habsburg Belligerents	Dates	Location	Phase	Result
Siege of Pilsen		(Kingdom of Bohemia) Bohemia (Duchy of Savoy) Savoy	(Kingdom of Bohemia) Royalist Bohemia	September 19-November 21, 1618	Pilsen, Bohemia	Bohemian Revolt	Bohemian Victory
Siege of Budweis		(Kingdom of Bohemia) Bohemia (Duchy of Savoy) Savoy	(Kingdom of Bohemia) Royalist Bohemia (Holy Roman Empire) Habsburg Monarchy	June–August, November – June, 1618	Budweis, Bohemia	Bohemian Revolt	Habsburg Victory
Siege of Vienna (1619)		(Kingdom of Bohemia) Bohemia; Principality of Transylvania	(Holy Roman Empire) Habsburg Monarchy; Lisowczyks	June 5-12, October-November 27, 1619	Vienna, Styria	Bohemian Revolt and Gabor Bethlen's Revolt	Polish-Habsburg Victory
Siege of Kreuznach		Palatinate	Spanish Empire	September 10, 1620	Bad Kreuznach, Electoral Palatinate	Palatinate campaign	Spanish Victory
Siege of Bautzen (1620)		(Kingdom of Bohemia) Bohemia	Saxony	October 5, 1620	Bautzen, Lusatia	Bohemian Revolt	Saxon Victory
Siege of Prachatice		(Kingdom of Bohemia) Bohemia	(Holy Roman Empire) Habsburg Monarchy; Catholic League	September 26-27, 1620	Prachatice, Bohemia	Bohemian Revolt	Habsburg-Liga Victory
Sieges of Písek (1619−1620)		(Kingdom of Bohemia) Bohemia	(Holy Roman Empire) Habsburg Monarchy; Catholic League	September 29-30, 1620	Písek, Bohemia	Bohemian Revolt	Habsburg-Liga Victory
Siege of Saint-Jean-d'Angély (1621)		Huguenots	France	May 30-June 24, 1621	Saint-Jean-d'Angély, France	Huguenot rebellions	French Victory
Siege of Montauban		Huguenots	France	August–November 1621	Montauban, France	Huguenot rebellions	Huguenots Victory
Siege of Jülich (1621-1622)		Dutch Republic	Spanish Empire	September 5, 1621-February 3, 1622	Jülich, Duchy of Jülich	Eighty Years' War, 1621–1648	Spanish Victory
Siege of Royan		Huguenots; La Rochelle	France	May, 1622	Royan, France	Huguenot rebellions	French Victory
Siege of Montpellier		Huguenots	France	August 31-October, 1622	Montpellier, France	Huguenot rebellions	Inconclusive
Siege of Steenbergen (1620)		Dutch Republic	Spanish Empire	Steenbergen	July, 1622	Eighty Years' War, 1621–1648	Spanish Victory
Siege of Bergen op Zoom (1622)		Dutch Republic; Scotland	Spanish Empire	July 8-October 2, 1622	Bergen op Zoom, Dutch Republic	Eighty Years' War, 1621–1648	Dutch Victory
Siege of Heidelberg (1622)		Electoral Palatinate; England	Holy Roman Empire; Catholic League (Spain) Spanish Empire	July 23-september 19, 1622	Heidelberg, Electoral Palatinate	Palatinate campaign	Spanish-Liga Victory
Siege of Frankenthal		Electoral Palatinate; England	Holy Roman Empire; Catholic League (Spain) Spanish Empire	1621-March 20, 1623	Frankenthal, Electoral Palatinate	Palatinate campaign	Spanish-Liga Victory
Siege of Breda (1624)		Dutch Republic; England	Spanish Empire	August 28, 1624-June 5, 1625	Breda, Dutch Republic	Eighty Years' War, 1621–1648	Spanish Victory
Siege of Oldenzaal (1626)		Dutch Republic; England	Spanish Empire	July 25- August 1, 1626	Oldenzaal, Spanish Netherlands	Eighty Years' War, 1621–1648	Dutch Victory
Siege of Groenlo (1627)		Dutch Republic; England	Spanish Empire	July 20-August 19, 1627	Groenlo, Spanish Netherlands	Eighty Years' War, 1621–1648	Dutch Victory
Siege of Stade		Denmark-Norway	Holy Roman Empire; Catholic League	October, 1627-April 27, 1628	Stade, Bremen	Danish intervention	Liga-Habsburg Victory
Siege of Stralsund (1628)		Denmark–Norway (yes) Swedish Empire; Hanseatic City of Stralsund	Holy Roman Empire; Catholic League	May-August 4, 1628	Stralsund, Pomerania	Danish intervention	Swedish-Danish Victory
Siege of 's-Hertogenbosch		Dutch Republic	Spanish Empire	April 30-September 14, 1629	's-Hertogenbosch, Spanish Netherlands	Eighty Years' War, 1621–1648	Dutch Victory
Siege of Wolgast (1630)		(yes) Swedish Empire	Holy Roman Empire	June 30-August 14, 1630	Wolgast, Pomerania	Swedish intervention	Swedish Victory
Siege of Malchin		(yes) Swedish Empire	Holy Roman Empire	March, 1631	Malchin, Pomerania	Swedish intervention	Swedish victory
Siege of Demmin		(yes) Swedish Empire	Holy Roman Empire	February 12-14, 1631	Demmin, Pomerania	Swedish intervention	Swedish victory
Siege of Landsberg		(yes) Swedish Empire	Holy Roman Empire	April 25-26, 1631	Landsberg an der Warthe, Brandenburg-Prussia	Swedish intervention	Swedish victory
Siege of Oppenheim		(yes) Swedish Empire	Spanish Empire	December 7-9, 1631	Oppenheim, Electoral Palatinate	Swedish intervention	Swedish victory
Siege of Koblenz (1632)		(yes) Swedish Empire	Holy Roman Empire	June 21, 1642	Koblenz, Trier	Swedish intervention	Swedish victory
Siege of Ingolstadt		(yes) Swedish Empire	Catholic League	April-May 1, 1632	Ingolstadt, Bavaria	Swedish intervention	Liga victory
Siege of Nuremberg		(yes) Swedish Empire	Holy Roman Empire; Catholic League	July 17-September 18, 1632	Nuremberg, Free Imperial City of Nuremberg	Swedish intervention	Inconclusive
Siege of Benfeld		(yes) Swedish Empire	Holy Roman Empire	September 8-October 29, 1632	Benfeld, Prince-Bishopric of Strasbourg	Swedish intervention	Swedish victory
Siege of Nancy (1633)		(Kingdom of France) France	Lorraine	August 26–September 25, 1633	Nancy, Lorraine	French invasion of Lorraine (1633-1634)	French Victory
Siege of Rheinfelden (1633)		(yes) Swedish Empire; Heilbronn League	Spanish Empire	October 17, 1633	Rheinfelden, Further Austria	Swedish intervention	Spanish victory
Siege of Minden		(yes) Swedish Empire; Brunswick-Lüneburg	Holy Roman Empire	July 24-October 24, 1634	Minden, Prince-Bishopric of Minden	Swedish intervention	Swedish-Lüneburg victory
Siege of La Mothe		(Kingdom of France) France	Lorraine	March 7-July 26, 1634	La Mothe-en-Bassigny, Lorraine	French invasion of Lorraine (1633-1634)	French Victory
Siege of Moyenvic		(Kingdom of France) France (yes) Swedish Empire	Lorraine; Holy Roman Empire	December 12-27, 1635	Moyenvic, Lorraine	French invasion of Lorraine (1633-1634)	Franco-Swedish Victory
Siege of Leuven		France; Dutch Republic	Holy Roman Empire; Spanish Empire	June 24-July 4, 1635	Leuven, Spanish Netherlands	Franco-Spanish War (1635–1659)	Imperial-Spanish victory
Siege of Schenkenschans		Dutch Republic	Spanish Empire	July 30-April 30, 1636	Schenkenschanz, Dutch Republic	Eighty Years' War, 1621–1648	First siege: Spanish victory Second siege: Dutch victory
Siege of Magdeburg (1636)		(yes) Swedish Empire	Holy Roman Empire; Electorate of Saxony	September, 1636	Magdeburg, Archbishopric of Magdeburg	Franco-Swedish intervention	Imperial-Saxon victory
Siege of Dole (1636)		(Kingdom of France) France; Swedish Empire; Weimar Army	Franche-Comté; Spanish Empire; Holy Roman Empire; Lorraine	May 28-August 15, 1636	Dole, Franche-Comté	Ten Years' War	Lorraine-Burgundian-Spanish-Imperial Victory
Siege of La Capelle		(Kingdom of France) France	Spanish Empire; Holy Roman Empire	July 2-8, 1635	La Capelle, France	Franco-Spanish War (1635–1659)	Spanish-Imperial Victory
First siege of Corbie		(Kingdom of France) France	Spanish Empire; Holy Roman Empire	August 7-15, 1635	Corbie, France	Franco-Spanish War (1635–1659)	Spanish-Imperial Victory
Second siege of Corbie		(Kingdom of France) France	Spanish Empire; Holy Roman Empire	September 30-November 14, 1636	Corbie, France	Franco-Spanish War (1635–1659)	French Victory
Siege of Saint-Jean de Losne		(Kingdom of France) France	Lorraine; Holy Roman Empire	October 25-November 3, 1636	Saint-Jean-de-Losne, France	Franco-Swedish intervention	French Victory
Siege of Landsberg (1637)		(yes) Swedish Empire	Holy Roman Empire	July 27-29, 1637	Landsberg an der Warthe, Brandenburg-Prussia	Franco-Swedish intervention	Imperial-Saxon victory
Siege of Breda (1637)		Dutch Republic	Spanish Empire	July 21-October 11, 1637	Breda, Spanish Netherlands	Eighty Years' War, 1621–1648	Dutch Victory
Siege of Venlo (1637)		Dutch Republic	Spanish Empire	August 20–25, 1637	Venlo, Dutch Republic	Eighty Years' War, 1621–1648	Spanish Victory
Siege of Landrecies (1637)		(Kingdom of France) France	Spanish Empire	?-July 26, 1637	Landrecies, Spanish Netherlands	Franco-Spanish War (1635–1659)	French victory
Siege of Maubeuge (1637)		(Kingdom of France) France	Spanish Empire	September, 1637	Spanish Netherlands	Franco-Spanish War (1635–1659)	French victory
Siege of Damvillers		(Kingdom of France) France	Spanish Empire	August 18-October 24, 1637	Damvillers, Spanish Netherlands	Franco-Spanish War	French victory
Siege of Leipzig (1637)		(yes) Swedish Empire	Holy Roman Empire; Electorate of Saxony	January-June 29, 1637	Leipzig, Saxony	Franco-Swedish intervention	Imperial-Saxon victory
Siege of Saint-Amour		(Kingdom of France) France	Franche-Comté; Spanish Empire	March 29-April 2, 1637	Saint-Amour, Franche-Comté	Ten Years' War	French victory
Siege of Lons-le-Saunier		(Kingdom of France) France	Franche-Comté; Spanish Empire	c. June 4-July 2, 1637	Lons-le-Saunier, Franche-Comté	Ten Years' War	French victory
Siege of Cateau-Cambrésis		(Kingdom of France) France	Spanish Empire	June, 1637	Cateau-Cambrésis, Spanish Netherlands	Franco-Spanish War (1635–1659)	French victory
Siege of Hanau		(yes) Swedish Empire; Hesse-Kassel	Holy Roman Empire	February 18, 1638	Hanau, Hanau-Münzenberg	Franco-Swedish intervention	Imperial victory
Siege of Saint-Omer		France	Spanish Empire; Holy Roman Empire	May 24-July 16, 1638	Saint-Omer, Spanish Netherlands	Franco-Spanish War (1635–1659)	Spanish-Imperial Victory
Siege of Fuenterrabía (1638)		France	Spanish Empire	June-September 7, 1638	Hondarribia, Spanish Empire	Franco-Spanish War (1635–1659)	Spanish Victory
Siege of Breisach		(Kingdom of France) France; Bernhardines	Holy Roman Empire (Electorate of Bavaria) Bavaria	August 18-December 17, 1638	Breisach, Further Austria	Franco-Swedish intervention	Franco-Weimaran Victory
Siege of Pontarlier (1639)		(Kingdom of France) France; Bernhardines	Franche-Comté; Spanish Empire	January 17-24, 1639	Pontarlier, Franche-Comté	Ten Years' War	Franco-Bernhardine victory
Siege of Freiberg (1639)		(yes) Swedish Empire	Holy Roman Empire (Electorate of Saxony) Saxony			Franco-Swedish intervention	Saxon-Imperial Victory
Siege of Nozeroy		(Kingdom of France) France	Franche-Comté; Spanish Empire	February 4-?, 1639	Nozeroy, Franche-Comté	Ten Years' War	French victory
Siege of Hesdin		(Kingdom of France) France	Spanish Empire	May 19-June 19, 1639	Hesdin, Spanish Netherlands	Franco-Spanish War (1635–1659)	French victory
Siege of Salses		France	Spanish Empire	June 9, 1639-January 6, 1640	Salses-le-Château, Principality of Catalonia	Franco-Spanish War (1635–1659)	Spanish Victory
Siege of Arras (1640)		France	Spanish Empire · Irish Soldiers	June 22-August 9, 1640	Arras, Spanish Netherlands	Franco-Spanish War (1635–1659)	French victory
Siege of Turin (1640)		France (Duchy of Savoy) Regency faction	Spanish Empire (Duchy of Savoy) Prince Thomas faction	May 22-September 20, 1640	Turin, Savoy	Franco-Spanish War (1635–1659) and Piedmontese Civil War	Franco-Savoyard Victory
Siege of Wolfenbüttel		(yes) Swedish Empire; France; Brunswick-Lüneburg	Holy Roman Empire; Bavaria	Fall 1640-September 23, 1643	Wolfenbüttel, Brunswick-Wolfenbüttel	Franco-Swedish intervention	Inconclusive
Siege of Bapaume		France	Spanish Empire	?-September 18, 1641	Bapaume, Spanish Netherlands	Franco-Spanish War (1635–1659)	French victory
Siege of Aire-sur-la-Lys (1641)		France	Spanish Empire	May 19-December 7, 1641	Aire-sur-la-Lys,Spanish Netherlands	Franco-Spanish War (1635–1659)	First siege: French victory Second siege: Spanish victory
Siege of Dorsten		Hesse-Kassel	Holy Roman Empire	July 6-September 19, 1641	Dorsten, Cologne	Franco-Swedish intervention	Imperial Victory
Siege of Dieuze		France	Lorraine	October ?-27, 1641	Dieuze, Lorraine	Franco-Swedish intervention	Lorraine victory
Siege of Freiberg (1642-1643)		(yes) Swedish Empire	Holy Roman Empire; Saxony	December 1642-February 27, 1643	Freiberg, Saxony	Franco-Swedish intervention	Imperial-Saxon Victory
Siege of Brno (1643)		(yes) Swedish Empire	Holy Roman Empire	September 1-9, 1643	Brno, Moravia	Franco-Swedish intervention	Imperial Victory
Siege of Olomouc (1643-1645)		(yes) Swedish Empire	Holy Roman Empire	Fall 1643 and June 1644 – March 1645	Olomouc, Moravia	Franco-Swedish intervention	Swedish Victory
Siege of Thionville (1643)		France	Spanish Empire	June 16-August 8, 1643	Thionville, Spanish Netherlands	Franco-Spanish War (1635–1659)	French Victory
Siege of Rottweil		France	Holy Roman Empire	?-November 18, 1646	Rottweil, Baden	Franco-Swedish intervention	Imperial Victory
Siege of Philippsburg (1644)		France	Holy Roman Empire	August 25-September 12, 1644	Philippsburg, Prince-Bishopric of Speyer	Franco-Swedish intervention	French Victory
Siege of Brno		(yes) Swedish Empire; Transylvania	Holy Roman Empire	May 3-August 23, 1645	Brno, Moravia	Franco-Swedish intervention	Imperial Victory
Siege of Hulst (1645)		Dutch Republic	Spanish Empire	October 7-November 4, 1645	Hulst, Spanish Netherlands	Eighty Years' War, 1621–1648	Dutch Victory
Siege of Lipnice		(yes) Swedish Empire	Holy Roman Empire	May 13-June 4 0r 14, 1646	Lipnice nad Sázavou, Bohemia	Franco-Swedish intervention	Imperial Victory
Siege of Korneuburg		(yes) Swedish Empire	Holy Roman Empire	May 22-August 4, 1646	Korneuburg, Lower Austria	Franco-Swedish intervention	Imperial Victory
Siege of Dunkirk (1646)		France; Dutch Republic	Spanish Empire	September 7-October 11, 1646	Dunkirk, Spanish Netherlands	Franco-Spanish War (1635–1659)	Franco-Dutch Victory
Siege of Lérida (1646)		France; Principality of Catalonia	Spanish Empire	May 12-November 22, 1646	Lérida, Principality of Catalonia	Reapers' War	Spanish Victory
Siege of Jihlava (1647)		(yes) Swedish Empire	Holy Roman Empire	September 1-December 8, 1647	Jihlava, Moravia	Franco-Swedish intervention	Imperial Victory
Siege of Weißenburg in Bayern		(yes) Swedish Empire	Holy Roman Empire; Bavaria	January 3-23 or February 1 or 2, 1647	Weißenburg in Bayern, Free Imperial City of Weißenburg in Bayern	Franco-Swedish intervention	Imperial-Bavarian Victory
Siege of Hohentübingen		France	Bavaria	January 14-March 18, 1647	Hohentübingen Castle, Württemberg	Franco-Swedish intervention	French victory
Siege of Eger (1647)		(yes) Swedish Empire	Holy Roman Empire	June 14-July 18, 1647	Eger, Bohemia	Franco-Swedish intervention	Swedish Victory
Siege of Lérida (1647)		France; Principality of Catalonia	Spanish Empire	May 12-June 17, 1647	Lérida, Principality of Catalonia	Reapers' War	Spanish Victory
Siege of Lens		France	Spanish Empire	c. August 4-October 3, 1647	Lens, Spanish Netherlands	Franco-Spanish War (1635–1659)	French Victory
Siege of Memmingen		(yes) Swedish Empire	Holy Roman Empire; Bavaria	September 9-November 23, 1647	Memmingen, Free Imperial City of Memmingen	Franco-Swedish intervention	Imperial-Bavarian Victory

== Other engagements ==
Battles of the Thirty Years' War
Battle	Image	Anti-Habsburg Belligerents	Pro-Habsburg Belligerents	Dates	Location	Phase	Result
Capture of Oppenheim		Palatinate	Spanish Empire	September 14, 1620	Oppenheim, Electoral Palatinate	Palatinate campaign	Spanish victory
Capture of Mannheim		Kingdom of England; Electoral Palatinate	Holy Roman Empire; Kingdom of Spain; Catholic League	October 20-November 2, 1622	Mannheim, Electoral Palatinate	Palatinate campaign	Spanish-Imperial victory
Relief of Genoa		France; Savoy	Spanish Empire; Genoa	March 28-April 24, 1625	Genoa, Republic of Genoa	Genoese–Savoyard War	Spanish-Genoese victory
Cádiz expedition (1625)		England; Dutch Republic	Spanish Empire	November 1-7, 1625	Bay of Cádiz, Spanish Empire	Anglo-Spanish War (1625–1630)	Spanish victory
Storming of Ribnitz		(yes) Swedish Empire	Holy Roman Empire	September 17, 1630	Ribnitz-Damgarten, Mecklenburg	Swedish intervention	Swedish victory
Assault on Greifenhagen		(yes) Swedish Empire	Holy Roman Empire	December 25, 1630	Greifenhagen, Pomerania	Swedish intervention	Swedish victory
Sack of Magdeburg		(yes) Swedish Empire; Magdeburg	Holy Roman Empire; Catholic League	May 20-24, 1631	Magdeburg, Archbishopric of Magdeburg	Swedish intervention	Imperial-Liga victory
Crossing of the Rhine (1631)		(yes) Swedish Empire	Holy Roman Empire	December 7, 1631	Oppenheim, Electoral Palatinate	Swedish intervention	Swedish victory
Relief of Konstanz (1633)		(yes) Swedish Empire; Heilbronn League	(Spanish Empire) Spain; Holy Roman Empire; Catholic League	September 7-October 3, 1633	Konstanz, Further Austria	Swedish intervention	Imperial-Liga victory
Relief of Breisach (1633)		(yes) Swedish Empire; Heilbronn League	(Spanish Empire) Spain; Holy Roman Empire; Catholic League	October 20, 1633	Breisach, Further Austria	Swedish intervention	Imperial-Liga victory
Sack of Tienen		France; Dutch Republic	Spanish Empire	June 8-10, 1635	Tienen, Spanish Netherlands	Eighty Years' War, 1621-1648 and Franco-Spanish War (1635-1659)	Franco-Dutch victory
Crossing of the Somme		France	Spanish Empire; Holy Roman Empire	August 5, 1636	Bray-sur-Somme, France	Franco-Spanish War (1635-1659)	Spanish-Imperial victory
Bresse and Bugey campaign		France	Spanish Empire; Franche-Comté	January 15-March 6, 1637	Bresse and Bugey, France	Ten Years' War	Franco-Dutch victory
Relief of Thionville		France	Spanish Empire; Holy Roman Empire	June 7, 1639	Thionville, Spanish Netherlands	Franco-Spanish War (1635-1659)	Spanish-Imperial victory
Blockade of Eger		(yes) Swedish Empire	Holy Roman Empire; Bavaria	October 25, 1647-April 6, 1648	Eger, Bohemia	Franco-Swedish intervention	Imperial-Saxon victory
