= Timeline of the Thirty Years' War =

(Note: All dates are in the Gregorian calendar which may result in discrepancy as some sources use the Julian calendar while others Gregorian.)

The Thirty Years' War was a European conflict fought between 1618 and 1648. In the early years it was primarily a civil war with its roots in the disagreements between supporters of the Protestant and Catholic faiths, but many other wars were being fought in Europe at the time and geopolitical considerations expanded the conflict. Most notable was the ongoing Eighty Years' War (c. 1566/1568–1648) in the Habsburg Netherlands between rebels and the ruling Spanish Empire.

== 1618 ==
- Protestant nobility of Bohemia rebel against their Catholic king, Ferdinand II
- 23 May, the Third defenestration of Prague leads to the Bohemian Revolt and the start of the war in the east.
- 19 September - 21 November, Pilsen, a Catholic refuge, is besieged and captured by the Bohemian army.
- 9 November, the Catholic army is defeated at the Battle of Lomnice and leave Bohemia.

== 1619 ==
- 10 June, Battle of Sablat, the Protestant army enroute to reinforce the siege of České Budějovice was defeated the by a Roman Catholic army and the siege was lifted.
- 5 August, Battle of Wisternitz, Ferdinand's forces defeated as they try to take Moravia.
- 26 August 1619, Frederick V of the Palatinate elected king of Bohemia
- 28 August 1619, Ferdinand II elected Holy Roman Emperor
- 8 October, Treaty of Munich, places the forces of the Catholic League at the emperor's service.
- 22-23 November, Battle of Humenné, Transylvanian troops, siding with Bohemia and threatening Vienna, is defeated and forced to retreat by Polish cavalry.

== 1619–1620 ==
- Gustavus Adolphus travels in Germany

== 1620 ==
- 3 July, the Protestant Union signed the Treaty of Ulm declaring neutrality.
- 30 August: The Spanish Army of Flanders enter the Lower Palatinate beginning the Palatinate campaign.
- 10 September: The Spanish force captures Kreuznach and Alzey in the Palatinate.
- 14 September: Spanish troops continue to take Oppenheim.
- 8 November: Battle of White Mountain: the army backing Frederick V was defeated by forces supporting Ferdinand II.

== 1621 ==
- Palatinate reduced
- 31 December, Peace of Nikolsburg ends the war between the Empire and Prince Gabriel Bethlen of Transylvania. This enabled Ferdinand to concentrate forces on the Palatinate-Neuburg.

== 1622 ==
- 27 April, Battle of Mingolsheim, Catholic forces retreat and bypass the Protestant army to meet up with reinforcements.
- 6 May, Battle of Wimpfen, the combined forces of the Catholic League and the Spanish Empire defeat the protestant armies.
- 20 June, Battle of Höchst results in a decisive win for the Catholic forces and Frederick V disbands his army which is later hired by the Dutch to relieve Bergen
- 8 July, Spanish forces begin the Siege of the Dutch city of Bergen op Zoom.
- 29 August, Battle of Fleurus. The Protestant army marching to relieve Bergen is intercepted and forced to retreat but escapes.
- 19 September, the besieged Heidelberg Castle surrenders to the Imperial and Spanish forces after 11 weeks of resistance.
- 2 October, the Siege of Bergen op Zoom is lifted with the arrival of the protestant army.
- 2 November, Mannheim is captured by the Imperial-Spanish army
- Danzig agrees to neutrality

== 1623 ==
=== August ===
- Mansfeld and Brunswick defeated on Weser

== 1625 ==
- Gustavus lands at the Dwina
- Christian IV of Denmark enters the war on the side of the Protestant cause.
- 9 December, Treaty of The Hague signed, giving Christian IV financial support from the English and Dutch.

== 1626 ==
- 17 January, Battle of Wallhof: Sweden defeated the Polish-Lithuanian Commonwealth.
- 25 April, Protestant forces defeated at the Battle of Dessau Bridge as they attemp to reach the headquarters of the Imperial Army in Magdeburg.
- May, Gustavus Adolphus of Sweden landed in Pillau as part of the Polish–Swedish War
- Königsberg and Prussian towns taken
- Siege of Danzig begins
- Relief of Mewe by Gustavus
- 27 August: Christian IV of Denmark defeated at the Battle of Lutter, ending his hope of expanding his German possessions.

== 1627 ==
=== Spring ===
- Swedish reverses

=== May ===
- Gustavus arrives at Danzig

=== May–June ===
- Gustavus twice wounded

=== Fall ===
- Naval battle off Danzig
- Storm of Wörmditt
- 20 November, the Capitulation of Franzburg is signed, in which the Duchy of Pomerania capitulates to the Holy Roman Empire.

=== Winter ===
- Baltic treaty with Denmark

=== Year-wide ===
- Tilly invades Holstein
- Wallenstein defeats Christian

== 1628 ==
=== Spring ===
- Defeat of Koniezpolski

=== July ===
- 24 July: Wallenstein defeated at Stralsund

== 1629 ==
- 6 March, Edict of Restitution proclaimed by Ferdinand II, requiring restoration to the Catholics of ecclesiastical properties that Protestants had secularized.

=== May ===
- 22 May: Peace of Lübeck restores territory to Denmark-Norway in exchange for their withdrawl from the conflict.

=== June ===
- 27 June: Operation at Stuhm

=== July ===
- 16 July: Victory at the Nogat

=== August ===
- Truce of Stuhmsdorf

=== Winter ===
- Winter, 1629–1630: Preparations for war

== 1630 ==
=== March–April ===
- Alexander Leslie, 1st Earl of Leven takes Rügen in the name of king of Sweden

=== June ===
- 9 June: Gustavus sets sail for Germany

=== July ===
- 4 July: Swedish forces land at Usedom
- Swedish forces take Usedom and Wolin islands
- 20 July: Swedes take Stettin
- 4 September: the Treaty of Stettin is concluded for the occupation of the Duchy of Pomerania by the Swedish Empire.

=== July–August ===
- Capture of coast towns

=== August ===
- Siege of Colberg begins
- 14 August: Swedish force take the Wolgast garrison
- 28 August: Savelli besieges Tollense

=== August–September ===
- Advance on Mecklenburg

=== September ===
- 27 September: Ribnitz taken by Gustavus
- September 1630 to May 1631: Siege of Magdeburg

=== November ===
- Congress of Ratisbon ends
- Tilly succeeds Wallenstein
- Gustavus defeats Savelli at Demmin
- 11 November: Battle of Schievelbein
- Battle of Ratzburg

=== December ===
- 25 December: Swedish forces captured Greifenhagen
- 26 December: Swedish forces captured Garz

== 1631 ==
=== January ===
- 18 January: Tilly reaches Frankfort
- 23 January: Treaty of Bärwalde in which France agrees to finance the Swedish intervention in the Thirty Years' War.
- 30 May, Treaty of Fontainebleau, France now agrees to protect Maximilian I of Bavaria from Gustavus Adolphus of Sweden

=== January–February ===
- Bärwalde Camp
- Demmin movement

=== February ===
- 15 February: Capture of Demmin

=== February–March ===
- Leipzig Convention

=== March ===
- 2 March: Swedish forces captured Colberg
- 23 March: Neu-Brandenburg massacre
- 31 March: Cüstrin surrenders to Swedish forces

=== April ===
- 3 April: Storm of Frankfort
- 9 April: Pappenheim captures outer forts of city (Magdeburg)
- 13 April: Swedish forces captured Frankfurt an der Oder
- 16 April: Landsberg falls
- 30 April: Falkenberg retires within walls

=== May ===
- 6 May: Swedish forces captured Spandau
- 20 May: Sack of Magdeburg

=== June ===
- Tilly marches on Hesse-Cassel
- 25 June: Capture of Greifswald

=== July ===
- 5 July: Dukes of Mecklenburg restored
- 10 July: Capture of Tangermünde

=== July–August ===
- Camp at Werben

=== August ===
- 1 August: Burgstall combat
- 7 August: Tilly defeated at Werben
- 8 August: Tilly retires
- 24 August: Hersfeld was conquered by Hesse-Cassel
- Gustavus fortifies Havel-Spree line
- End August: Tilly moves on Hesse-Cassel

=== September ===
- Early September: Tilly moves on Saxony
- 9 September: Fritzlar was conquered by Hesse-Cassel
- 10 September: Gustavus' treaty with Saxony
- 15 September: Saxon and Swedish armies join at Düben
- 16 September: Tilly captures Leipsic
- 17 September: Battle of Breitenfeld (1631)
- 27 September: Gustavus heads for Thuringia

=== October ===
- 2 October: Gustavus arrives at Erfurt
- 8 October: March through Thüringerwald
- 15 October: Würzburg captured
- 17 October: Marienburg captured
- 25 October: Imperial garrison withdraws from Rostock due to Swedish pressure

=== November ===
- 2 November: Gustavus defeats duke of Lorraine
- Early November: Saxons move to Prague
- 10 November: Gustavus starts down the Main
- 28 November: Swedes captured Frankfurt am Main

=== December ===
- Worms captured by Swedish forces
- Arnsburg Abbey overran and plundered by Swedish troops.
- 4 December: Tilly attacks Nürnberg
- 13 December: Spanish garrison in Gernsheim surrenders to Swedish forces
- 19 December: Spanish forces in Oppenheim surrender to Swedish army
- 23 December: Mainz surrenders to Swedish forces
- Swedish forces deployed in Zweibrücken.

== 1632 ==
=== January ===
- 11 January: Swedish forces entered the ruined city of Magdeburg following the Imperial withdrawal.
- 18 January: Tilly withdraws from Nürnberg
- 22 January: The imperial garrison in Wismar surrenders to Swedish forces

=== February ===
- 3 February: Johan Fredrik forces captured Verden
- 4 February: Swedish forces entered Lüneburg and Goslar
- 10 February: Swedish General Baudissin captured the Landskron fortress.
- Wallenstein invades Bohemia
- Swedish forces captured Gottingen

=== March ===
- 9 March: Catholic forces captured Bamberg
- 15 March: Gustavus joins Horn
- 31 March: Gustavus enters Nürnberg

=== April ===
- 5 April: Swedish forces captured Donauwörth
- 15 April: The crossing of the Lech
- 16 April: Swedish army occupied Memmingen.
- 20 April: Gustavus takes Augsburg and Biberach an der Riß
- 29 April: Gustavus moves on Ingolstadt
- End of April to beginning of May: Unsuccessful Siege of Ingolstadt
- Swedish and Württemberg forces captured Radolfzell on the shore of Constane Lake.

=== May ===
- 8 May: Swedish army entered Landshut demanding a large tribute and left the town afterwards.
- 10 May: Gustavus enters Munich
- 18 May: Wallenstein takes Prague

=== May–June ===
- Gustavus reduces Swabia and Bavaria

=== June ===
- 12 June: Gustavus starts north
- 17 June to 1 July: Gustavus at Hersebruck
- 18 June: Gustavus at Fürth
- 24 June: Wallenstein and Maximilian join

=== July ===
- 1 July: Swedish troops captured Koblenz.
- 3 July: Gustavus reaches Nürnberg
- 13 July: Wallenstein reaches Nürnberg
- 15 July: Wallenstein fails in a surprise

=== July–August ===
- Starving match at Nürnberg

=== August ===
- 6 August: Wallenstein captures Lichtenau
- 9 August: Gustavus captures convoy
- 23 August: Oxenstiern arrives with reinforcements
- 31 August: Gustavus offers Wallenstein battle

=== September ===
- 1 September: Swedish forces captured Strasbourg
- 3 September: Gustavus attacks the Alte Veste
- 4 September: Saxon-Swedish victory at the First Battle of Steinau
- 6 September: Saxon-Swedish forces captured Wrocław
- 10 September: Saxon-Swedish forces captured Schweidnitz.
- 19 September: Gustavus leaves Nürnberg
- 21 September: Wallenstein leaves Nürnberg

=== October ===
- Early October: Gustavus on the Danube
- 15 October: Wallenstein starts for Saxony
- 18 October: Gustavus starts for Saxony

=== November ===
- 2 November: Wallenstein takes Leipsic
- Early November: Gustavus at Erfurt
- 9 November: Gustavus crosses Saale
- 16 November: the Battle of Lützen and Gustavus' death

=== December ===
- 30 December: Swedish forces under the command of Horn captured Freiburg im Breisgau

== 1633 ==
- Bernard operates on the Danube
- Horn operates in Swabia
- Wallenstein operates on the Oder

=== January ===
- Spanish troops recaptured the Olbrück and Landskron castles.

=== February ===
- 6 February: William V, Landgrave of Hesse-Kassel entered Dortmund unopposed.
- 9 February: Hesse-Cassel captured the town of Dorsten without resistance from the Electorate of Cologne
- 16 February: Swedish troops captured Mindelheim.
- 19 February: General Altringer defeats the Swedes at the monastery of Zwiefalten.
- 28 February: Bernhard of Saxe-Weimar captured the town of Höchstädt an der Donau, as well as Bamberg.

=== March ===
- 16 March: Swedish troops captured Montabaur.

=== April ===
- Peter Melander, Graf von Holzappel's Hessian forces take Paderborn.
- 23 April, the Heilbronn League, and anti-Imperial alliance is formed among some Protestant German states.

=== May ===
- 1 May: Swedish General Torstenson captures Landsberg am Lech.
- 26 May: Swedish troops captured the Heidelberg Castle.
- 28 May: The Bavarian garrison of Eichstätt capitulates to Duke Bernhard of Saxe-Weimar.

=== July ===
- 6 July: Battle of Oldendorf: Swedish troops captured Hamelin

=== September ===
- 12 September: Swedish forces captured Osnabrück
- 26 September: Saxon-Swedish forces withdrew from Schweidnitz following a Catholic siege.
- 27 September: Imperial forces recaptured the Biberach an der Riß.

=== October ===
- 5 October: Expulsion of the Swedes from Paderborn.
- 11 October: Swedish-Saxon defeat at the Second Battle of Steinau.

=== November ===
- 14 November: Protestant forces led by Bernard of Saxe-Weimar captured Regensburg.
- 23 November: Swedish forces captured Straubing after a four-day siege.

== 1634 ==
=== February ===
- 25 February: Wallenstein assassinated

=== March ===
- Swedish forces again captured the Biberach an der Riß.

=== July ===
- 22 July: Swedish forces plundered Landshut again. Imperial forces captured Regensburg.

=== August ===
- 8 August: Catholic forces capture Regensburg and the Swedish garrison surrenders

=== September ===
- 6 September: Battle of Nördlingen (1634)

=== October ===
- 1 October: Large-scale Protestant attack on Constance fails with more than 1,000 dead.

== 1635 ==
- January: The Swedes lose Nuremberg
- March: The Swedes lose Augsburg

== 1636 ==
- January: Sweden’s former ally Brandenburg declares war on Sweden
- March: The Swedish garrison in Magdeburg surrenders
- 4 October: The Swedish commander Johan Baner defeats the combined Imperial-Saxon army at Wittstock

== 1641–1642 ==
- Torstenson commands Swedish army

== 1642 ==
=== June ===
- 3 June: Swedish forces captured Schweidnitz .

=== October ===
- 23 October: Battle of Edgehill

== 1643 ==
=== May ===
- Battle of Grantham
- 19 May: Battle of Rocroy

=== July ===
- Battle of Gainsborough

=== October ===
- Battle of Winceby

=== December ===
- Turenne takes command of French army

== 1644 ==
=== May ===
- Turenne's raid into Swabia
- 17 May: Imperial forces recaptured Schweidnitz .

=== June ===
- Turenne's failure at Freiburg

=== July ===
- 2 July: Battle of Marston Moor

=== August ===
- 3–9 August: Battle of Freiburg

=== September ===
- 12 September: Capture of Philippsburg

=== September–December ===
- Capture of Mainz and other places

== 1645 ==
=== February ===
- "New Model" army voted

=== April ===
- Turenne crosses Rhine

=== May ===
- 5 May: Battle of Mergentheim

=== June ===
- 14 June: Battle of Naseby

=== July ===
- 5 July: Condé joins French army

=== August ===
- 5 August: Battle of Allerheim

== 1646 ==
=== June ===
- Nidda operation

=== September–October ===
- Condé at Dunkirk

=== October ===
- Memmingen operation

== 1647 ==
=== March ===
- Bavaria deserts Ferdinand

=== Year-wide ===
- Condé in Catalonia

== 1648 ==
=== May ===
- Zumarshausen operation
- Condé takes Ypres

=== July ===
- Turenne on the Inn

=== August ===
- Battle of Preston Pans
- 24 August: Battle of Lens

=== October ===
- 24 October: Peace of Westphalia

== See also ==
- List of battles of the Thirty Years' War
