= Siege of Demmin =

Part of the Thirty Years' War in 1631

- Part of the Thirty Years' War
- Map of Demmin, made in 1658
Date	12–14 February, 1631
Location	Demmin, Mecklenburg-Vorpommern (At the time in the Duchy of Pomerania) 53°54′18″N 13°02′38″E
Result	Swedish victory
Territorial changes	Demmin is captured by Swedish forces

Belligerents
(yes) Swedish Empire	Holy Roman Empire

Commanders and leaders
(yes) Gustavus Adolphus (yes) Dodo zu Knyphausen (yes) Maximilian Teuffel (yes) John Hepburn (yes) Robert Monro (yes) James Lumsden (yes) Donald Mackay	Federico Savelli; Heinrich Holk

Units involved
(yes) Yellow Brigade (yes) Mackay’s Regiment of Foote (yes) Green Brigade (yes) Lumdsen’s Regiment (yes) Dumbartons Regiment (yes) Stargate’s Regiment	Demmin garrison Holk regiment

Strength
19,000 men	2,100 men

The Siege of Demnin was a Swedish siege of the Pomeranian town of Demmin during the Thirty Years' War, the siege would result in a Swedish victory.

== Background ==
After thoroughly defeating a Liga army on the coast and establishing a bridgehead near Stettin in 1630, Gustavus Adolphus continued his campaign to secure Pomerania during the winter of the following year. He departed from Gartz with 16,000 men, while 9,000 men remained under the command of Gustaf Horn. During the offensive, the Swedes quickly captured several towns and were soon in Loitz, where about 3,000 men under the command of Dodo zu Knyphausen joined them from Stralsund. The Swedish army then marched towards Demmin.

== Siege ==
=== Beginning of the Siege ===
On February 12, the Swedes arrived at Demmin and immediately surrounded it. Thanks to the severe cold, the swamps, and the rivers surrounding the city were frozen, which made it easier for the Swedish movements. The fortress was strong, was in the direction of Stralsund, and an attacking army was met first by a castle, and then by a tower. The fortress's garrison, 2,100 men under Federico Savelli, had orders to defend itself for at least two weeks so that relief under Johann Tserclaes Tilly would have time to arrive.

=== First attacks ===
Gustavus Adolphus established himself with the artillery at Nonnenberg, from where he began shelling the city. The plan was that part of the Swedish army would carry out a false attack on the castle while the Yellow Brigade under Maximilian Teuffel attacked the fortress from the western side. While Teuffel attacked the city and captured its outskirts, the attack on the castle met with great success when its defenders, consisting of 400 infantry from the Holk regiment, set the castle on fire and retreated to the tower.

=== Swedish successes ===
The day after the Swedes took the castle, they began shelling the tower, whose thick walls the Swedish artillery could not destroy. Since the besieged soldiers in the tower refused to surrender, Gustavus ordered it to be mined. When the soldiers realized this, they retreated again, but were soon captured by a detachment of the Yellow Brigade. Their standards were placed on the Nonnenberg in view of those still besieged in the city. Lieutenant Colonel Robert Monro, a Scotsman in Swedish service, described an incident during the siege.

While the artillery continued to bombard the city, Gustavus decided to examine the walls more closely and therefore walked around them. During the journey, however, the ice broke at one point and Gustavus was left standing with water up to his arms while the soldiers in the fortress took the opportunity to shoot at him. After Gustavus got out of the water alone, he changed clothes, ate a bite of food and then returned to the battle line where he was again in danger of death.'

=== Conquest of Demmin ===
By 14 February, the Swedish artillery had destroyed large parts of the wall and the Imperial position were becoming increasingly weak. At the same time, Federico Savelli feared that the valuables he had captured during his campaigns would be lost, and he therefore proposed handing Demmin over to the Swedes in exchange for the garrison being allowed to depart with all its property. Gustavus, who Demmin before Tilly's arrived, accepted the proposal. The following day, the garrison marched out of the fortress. The Swedes captured 36 cannons, gunpowder and grain along with the fortress.

== Aftermath ==
The conquest of Demmin significantly strengthened the Swedes' position on the Baltic coast, within two months Frankfurt an der Oder was also taken and the Swedish operations to the south could begin in earnest.

== Sources ==
- History Recognized, Dumbartons Regiment
- Anders Fryxell (1862). Berättelser ur svenska historien. Sjette delen, Gustaf II Adolf.
- Oredsson, Sverker (2007). Gustav II Adolf. Atlantis. sid. 221–222. ISBN 978-91-7353-157-3. Läst 9 November 2024.
- Monro, His Expedition With the Worthy Scots Regiment Called Mac-Keys.
- Black, Jeremy (5 July 2005). European Warfare, 1494–1660. Routledge. ISBN 978-1-134-47708-1.
- Wetterberg 2002, p. 422.
- Harrison, Dick (2016-11-01). "Kriget i Preussen var en katastrof". Svenska Dagbladet (in Swedish). ISSN 1101-2412. Retrieved 2024-09-13.

== See also ==
- Siege of Landsberg
- Scotland in the Thirty Years' War
- Siege of Wolgast (1630)
- Battle of Frankfurt an der Oder
