= Siege of Landsberg =

1631 Siege

- Part of the Thirty Years' War
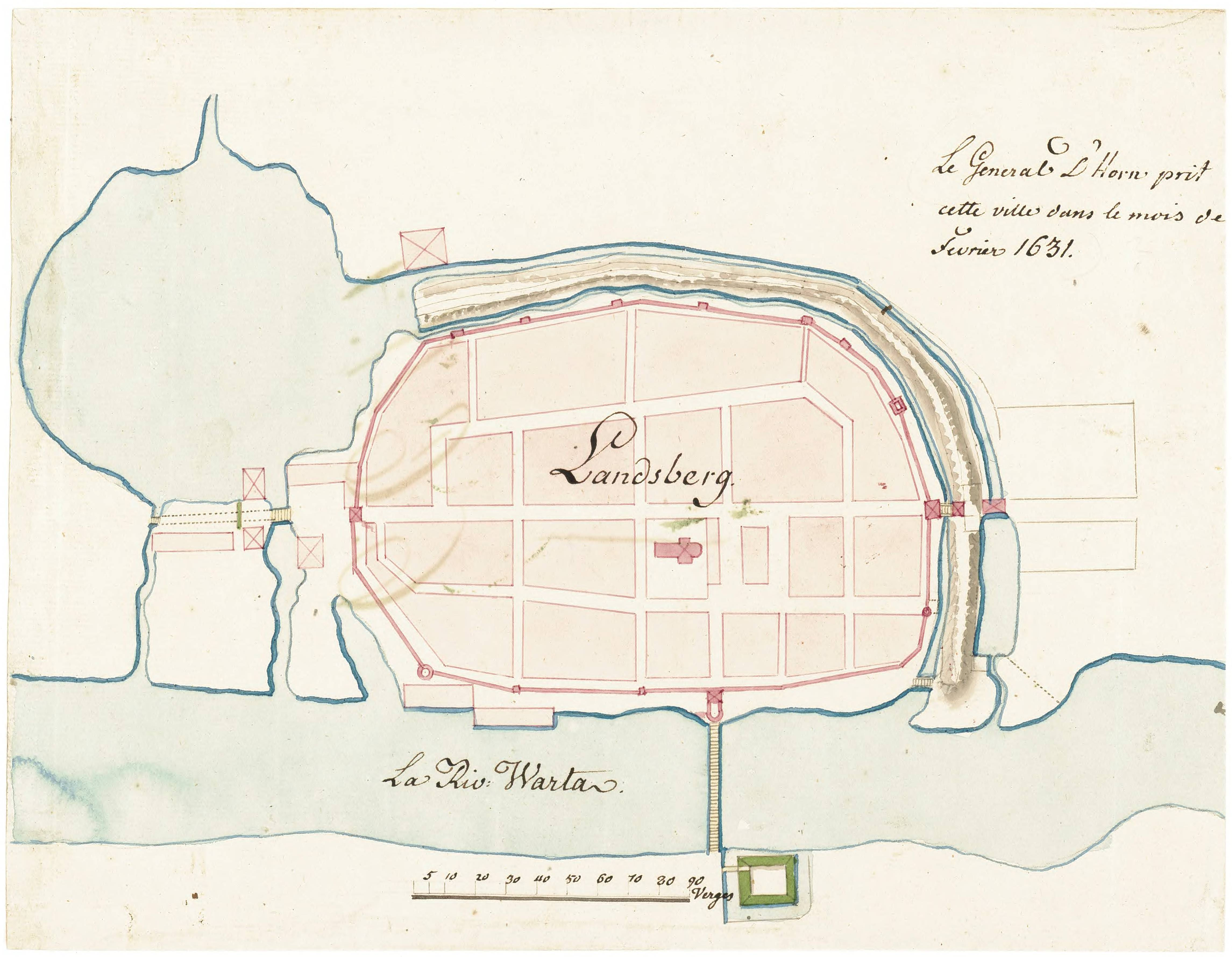
- A map of Landsberg from 1631 depicting the siege
Date	25–26 April, 1631
Location	Landsberg an der Warthe (modern-day Gorzów Wielkopolski), West Pomeranian Voivodeship 52°44′N 15°15′E
Result	Swedish victory
Territorial changes	Landsberg is captured by Swedish forces

Belligerents
(yes) Swedish Empire	Holy Roman Empire

Commanders and leaders
(yes) Gustavus Adolphus (yes) Gustaf Horn (yes) Johan Banér (yes) Patrick Ruthven (Swedish Empire) Robert Monro (Swedish Empire) John Hepburn (Swedish Empire) Donald Mackay	Adam von Scharfenstein (Holy Roman Empire) Julius Henry

Units involved
(yes) (Kingdom of Scotland) Mackay’s Regiment of Foote (Swedish Empire) (Kingdom of Scotland) Green Brigade	Landsberg garrison (Holy Roman Empire) Atlsächsisch Regiment

Strength
9,500	4,000–6,000

Casualties and losses
Insignificant	Heavy

The Siege of Landsberg was a Swedish siege of Landsberg an der Warthe during the Thirty Years' War.

== Background ==
After storming Frankfurt an der Oder, Gustavus Adolphus immediately marched with part of his army towards the southern side of Landsberg an der Warthe while Gustaf Horn approached the city from the north. He planned to secure his eastern flank in this way. Both reached the city on 17 April. Johan Banér was simultaneously ordered to demolish the bridge at Küstrin and complete a redoubt there, as well as to fortify Frankfurt to protect against Tilly's army, which was feared to intervene in the Swedish operations. On 25 April, Johan Banér also arrived with more soldiers from Frankfurt.

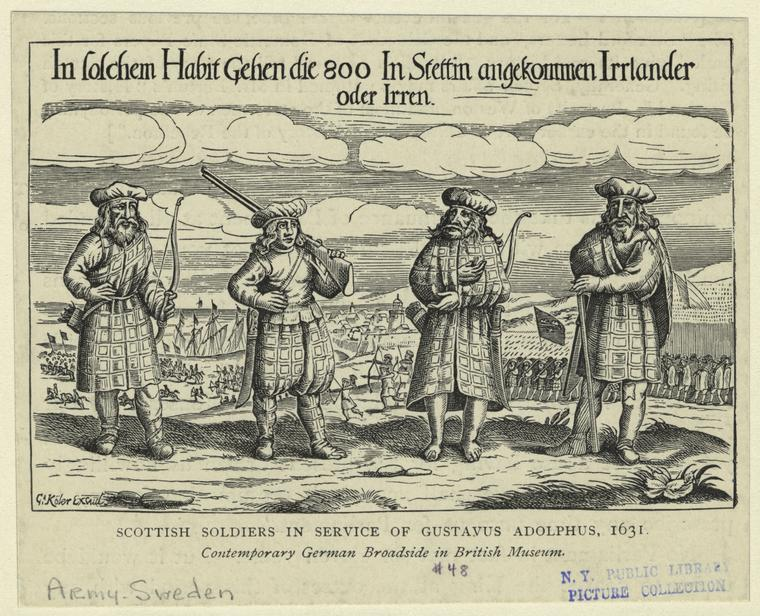
Scottish soldiers in service of Gustavus Adolphus

The siege began on the same day, as Gustavus Adolphus and Gustaf Horn had meanwhile built bridges over the Warthe River. Many of there troops were made up of Scottish troops under the command of Patrick Ruthven, Robert Monro, John Hepburn, and Donald Mackay.

== Siege ==
The Swedes first directed artillery fire at a redoubt located outside Landsberg, which was then stormed. Then the siege of the city began while a guard detachment of Croats was driven away. During the afternoon, an attack from the city was also repelled, after which the garrison carried out a heavy fire until the evening. When the Swedes then tried to start negotiations, the city asked for two days of reflection, but when Gustavus Adolphus refused this, the city gave in, in exchange for the garrison being allowed to march away and promised not to fight for eight months.

== Sources ==
- Ike Skelton Combined Arm Research Library, Army of the Holy Roman Empire 1631.
- Mankell, Julius (4 mars 2025). Arkiv till upplysning om svenska krigens och krigsinrättningarnes historia, tredje bandet. sid. XXII
- Dodge, Theodor Ayrault (4 mars 2025). Gustavus Adolphus; a history of the art of war from its revival after the middle ages to the end of the Spanish succession war, with a detailed account of the campaigns of the great Swede, and of the most famous campaign of Turenne, Condé, Eugene and Marlborough. With 237 charts, maps, plans of battles and tactical manoeuvres, cuts of uniforms, arms, and weapons. sid. 213
- Munthe, Ludvig Wilhelmson (4 mars 2025). Kongl. fortifikationens historia. sid. 458–459
- Starbäck, Carl Georg (4 mars 2025). Berättelser ur svenska historien, fjerde bandet. Gustaf II Adolf. sid. 316
