= Henri Duval, Count of Dampierre =

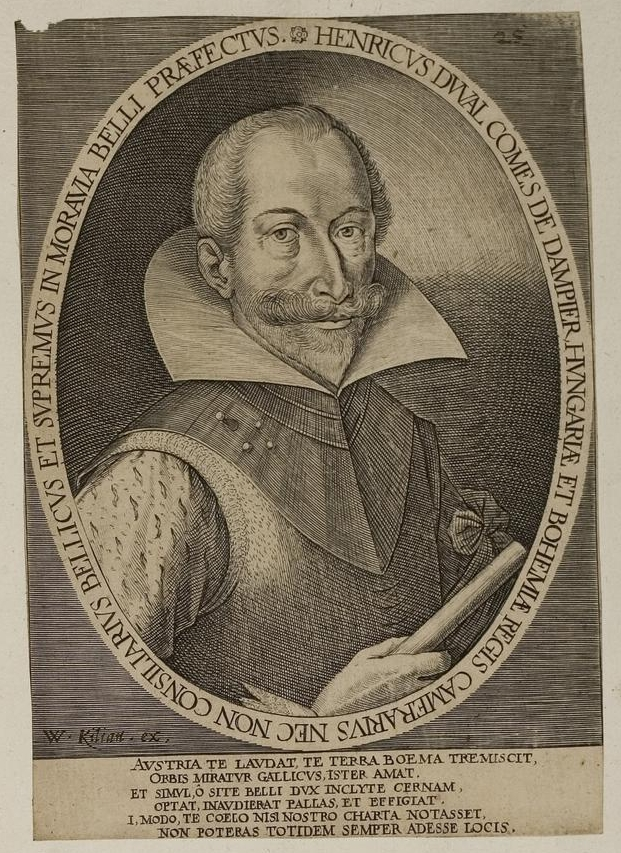

Henri Duval, Count of Dampierre (1580 – 8 October 1620), often known simply as Henri de Dampierre, was a commander of imperial forces during the Bohemian Revolt that initiated the Thirty Years' War.

== Life ==
Born in the castle of Hans, in the Prince-Bishopric of Metz, Dampierre entered Austrian Habsburg service in 1602, during the Long Turkish War, and fought under Giorgio Basta against Stephen Bocskai during the Bocskai uprising. In 1605, mutineers in the garrison he was commanding forced him to surrender Esztergom to the besieging Turks.

Dampierre was an active commander during the Uskok War, and in 1618 was sent to Bohemia at the head of a hastily raised force to help put down the Bohemian Revolt. In August 1619 he was defeated by Moravian forces in the Battle of Wisternitz. In the same year he raised a regiment of cuirassiers that would become the 8th Bohemian Dragoons, eventually the oldest regiment in regular imperial Austrian service. His men foiled a Protestant attempt to intimidate Ferdinand II into making concessions by storming the Hofburg Palace. Sent to prevent Gabriel Bethlen from linking up with the Bohemian rebels, Dampierre died of his wounds on 8 October 1620, after leading an unsuccessful assault on Pressburg Castle.

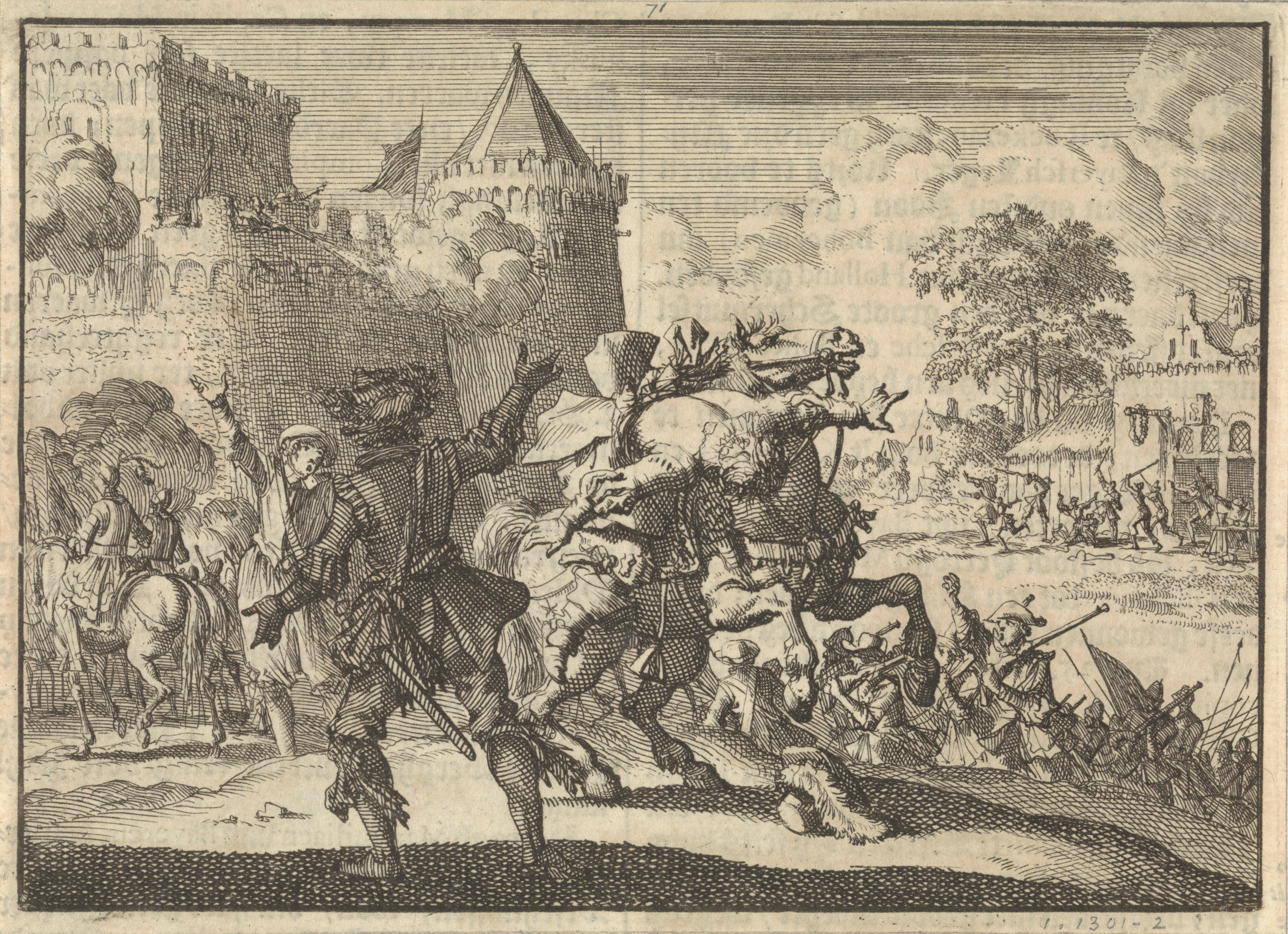
An engraved book illustration of 1698 depicting Dampierre's fatal injury in 1620

His tomb is in the Minoritenkirche in Vienna.
