= Dwina =

Dwina may refer to:

- Northern Dvina, a river in the Vologda and Arkhangelsk Oblasts, Russia
- Western Dvina or Daugava, a river in Russia, Belarus and Latvia
- Dwina, Virginia, a community in Wise County, Virginia
