= Federico Savelli =

Italian military commander

Federico Savelli (died 19 December 1649) was an Italian military commander who fought in the Thirty Years' War.

== Biography ==
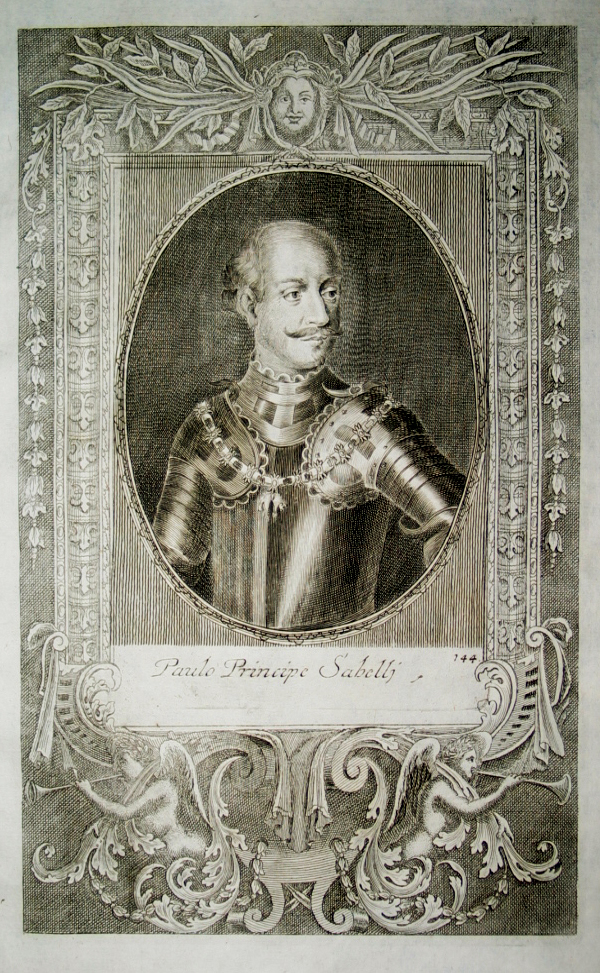
Federico Savelli

Born into a noble family of Rome, he was the son of Bernardino Savelli, lord of Palombara, and Lucrezia degli Anguillara.

After fighting in Hungary for emperor Rudolph II, he was made commander-in-chief of Bologna, Ferrara and the Romagna by Pope Paul V. Pope Gregory XV made him lieutenant general of the Papal States. After another period as commander of Ferrara, Savelli moved to Germany, at the service of emperor Ferdinand II, who named him as chamberlain.

Subsequently Savelli gained the favour of Albrecht von Wallenstein, the imperial generalissimo during the early stages of the Thirty Years' War, and obtained the command of Mecklenburg. The surrender of Demmin to Gustavus Adolphus of Sweden and his poor commanding performances caused a momentary obfuscation of Savelli's star, although Ferdinand kept his at his service and appointed him as ambassador to the Pope in 1631. On 19 January 1635 he was named imperial field-marshal.

After the accession of Ferdinand III of Habsburg as emperor, Savelli was one of the commanders of imperial army alongside Johann von Werth. He was defeated and made prisoner at the Second Battle of Rheinfelden (1638), but was able to escape and was sent back as ambassador at the Papal court. During the War of Castro, he was commander of Perugia. In 1646, he defended the Habsburg stronghold of Orbetello against a French naval attack.

Federico Savelli died in December 1649.

== Sources ==
- "Savelli, Freidrich Herzog von". Allgemeine Deutsche Biographie (in German). Leipzig: Duncker & Humblot. 1907.
