= Siege of Minden =

1634 siege of the Thirty Years' War

- Part of the Thirty Years' War
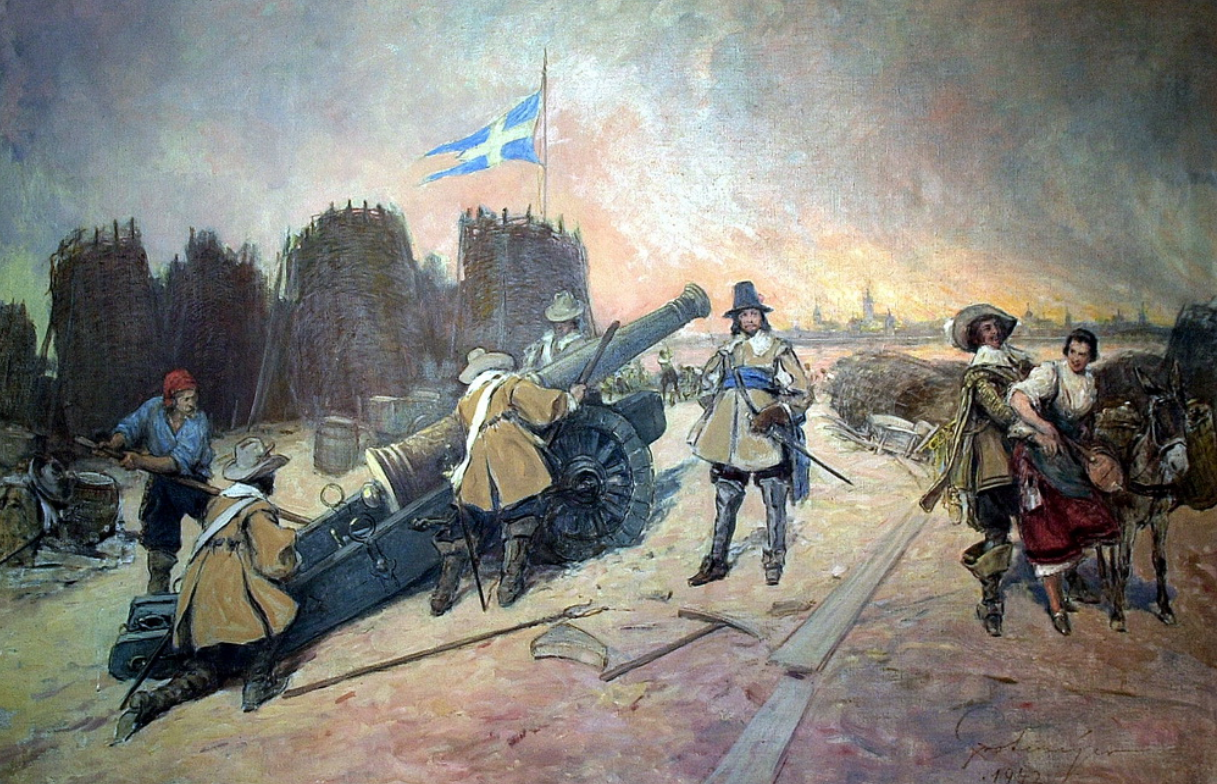
- The Lüneburgers besiege Minden
Date	October 24, 1634
Location	Minden, Germany
Result	Lüneburg-Swedish victory

Belligerents
(yes) Swedish Empire; Brunswick-Lüneburg; Brunswick-Calenberg	Holy Roman Empire; Minden

Commanders and leaders
Georg von Brunswick-Lüneburg	(Holy Roman Empire) Count Waldeck (surrendered)

Units involved
Lüneburg Army	(Holy Roman Empire) Minden Garrison

Strength
Unknown	Unknown (Note: Far larger than the Imperials)

Casualties and losses
Unknown	Garrison Surrendered

The Siege of Minden was a siege during the Swedish Intervention in the Thirty Years' War involving action between a Swedish-Lüneburg Army and an Imperial Army. The siege lasted 3 months from July 24 to October 24, 1634.

== Background ==
=== Minden in the Thirty Years' War ===
By the time of the war Minden was its own Price-Bishopric but had close ties to the Duchy of Brunswick-Lüneburg, most of the population of Minden was Protestant. When the war reached Lower Saxony, Minden was occupied by the Danes but following Lutter, Count Tilly forced the Danish garrison to leave the city, and following that it had an Imperial garrison until the it fell to the Lüneburgers.

=== Swedish Intervention ===
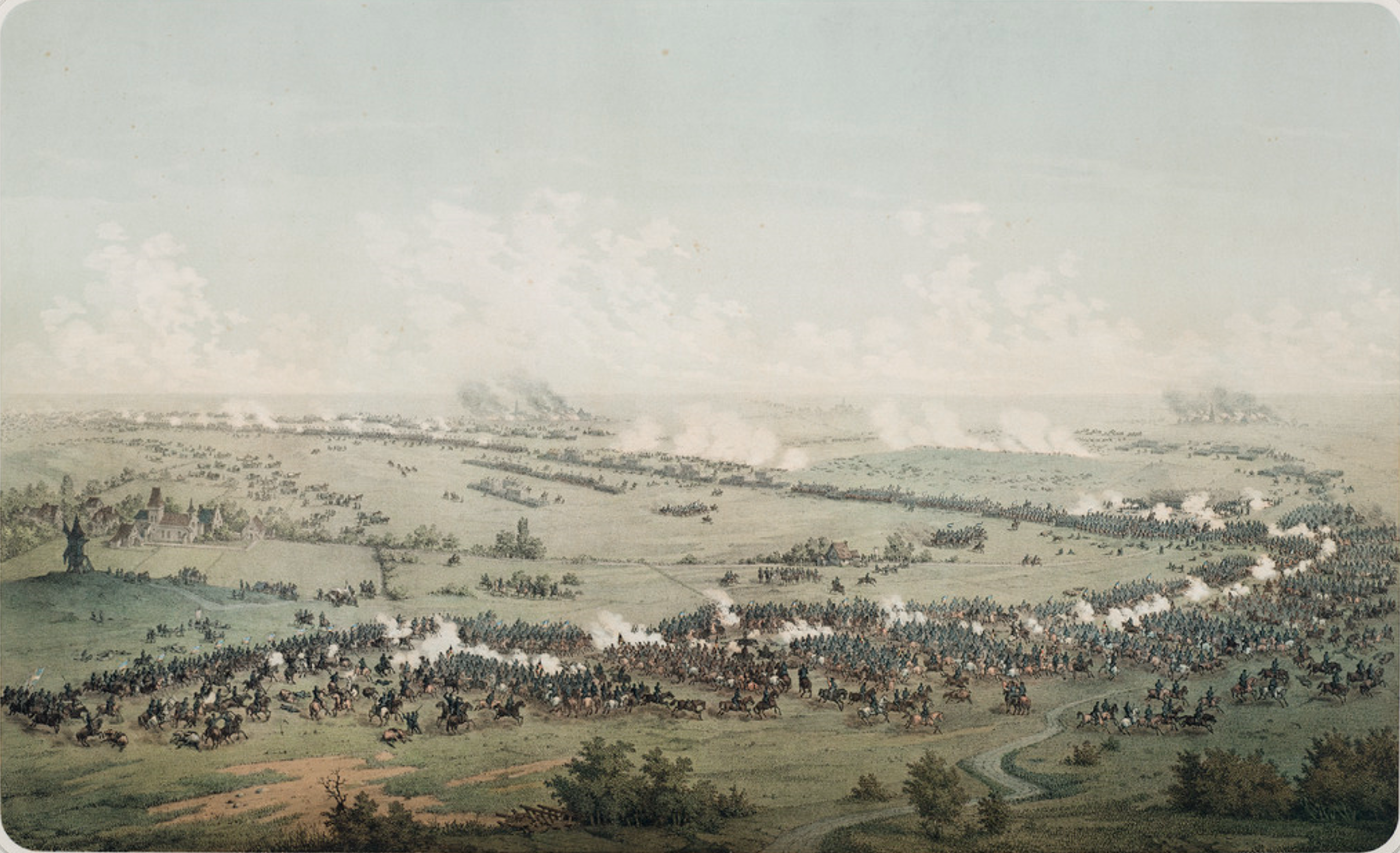
The battle of Breitenfeld

On July 6, 1630, Gustavus Adolphus landed on Wollin. By mid-1631 he had occupied Pomerania and Mecklenburg, and had made Hesse-Kassel and Brandenburg-Prussia to join him. In September of the same year Gustavus one a great victory at Breitenfeld. Lüneburg joined the Swedes as Gustavus overran much of Germany but one years later he was killed at Lützen.

=== Lüneburg Intervention ===
Brunswick-Lüneburg's duke, Georg had large ambitions, which included Minden and Hildesheim. The Swedes promised to give Georg Hildesheim and Minden, in 1632 Georg and a Hessian-Lüneburg-Swedish Army defeated an Imperial Army at Hessich-Oldendorf and conquered Hamelin. Georg now moved north and laid siege to the Imperial Garrison under Waldeck.

== Siege ==
=== Minden ===
Minden is crossed by the Weser flowing north. The town centre lies on a plateau on the western side of the river 5 kilometres (3 miles) north of the Porta Westfalica gap between the ridges of the Weser Hills and Wiehen Hills, where the Weser leaves the Weser Uplands and flows into the North German Plain. The small Bastau stream flows into the Weser from the west near the town centre. The edge of the plateau marks the transition from the Middle Weser Valley to the Lübbecke Loessland, divides the upper town from the lower towns. The town had large walls and had several forts with a bridge over the Weser.

=== Siege ===
the Swedish-Lüneburg-Caldenberg army arrived at the city on July 24, 1634, and set up siege works. The garrison did not expect the siege, so the garrison was far smaller than the Allied army. The siege lasted 3 months and on October 24, 1634.

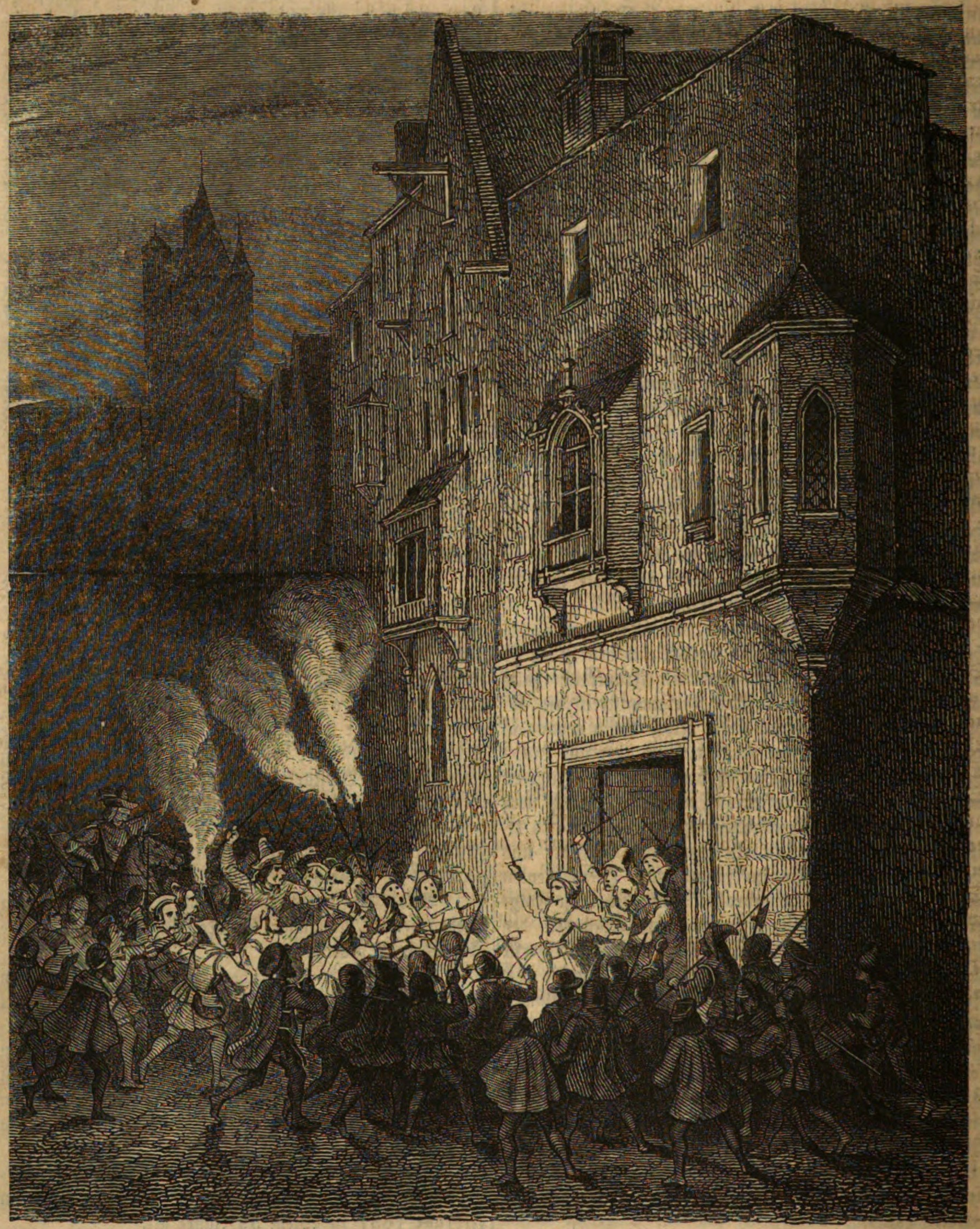
The Swedes enter Minden through treason

=== Capture ===
The population of Minden was primarily Protestant and many of them objected to the Catholic rule and occupation by Catholic troops. One of the people of Minden who was sympathetic to Lüneburgers opened one of the gates allowed Swedish and Lüneburg troops to push into the city without suffering heavy casualties. On October 24, Waldeck and the surviving troops surrendered.

== Aftermath and consequences ==
=== Aftermath ===
Following the victory Georg captured Hildesheim but the Swedes were beaten at Nördlingen forcing the Swedes to retreat back to Pomerania while garrisons were left in Erfurt, Mainz, Osnabruck, Hanau, and Strasbourg. Lüneburg, Saxony, and Brandenburg switched sides and raised troops for the Holy Roman Empire, Lüneburg did not stay in the alliance with the Holy Roman Emperor because of Imperial defeats at Wittstock.

=== Minden ===
After Duke Georg captured Minden, the city remained Protestant. Queen Christina of Sweden granted it complete political independence, a privilege the citizens had long fought for. But when Minden was awarded to the Elector of Brandenburg in the Peace of Westphalia in 1648, the newly won freedom was over: Elector Frederick William did not recognize Minden's privileges, the city was forced to accept troops, and became a garrison and fortress town.

== Sources ==
- Belagerung Mindens durch die Schweden (1634), Fritz Grotemeyer
- Coinsweekly, The Thirty Years' War – Part 14 (1634–1635), Ursula Kampmann, translated by Annika Backe
