= Battle of Wisternitz =

1619 battle of the Thirty Years' War

Coordinates: 48°53′46″N 16°38′55″E

- Part of the Thirty Years' War
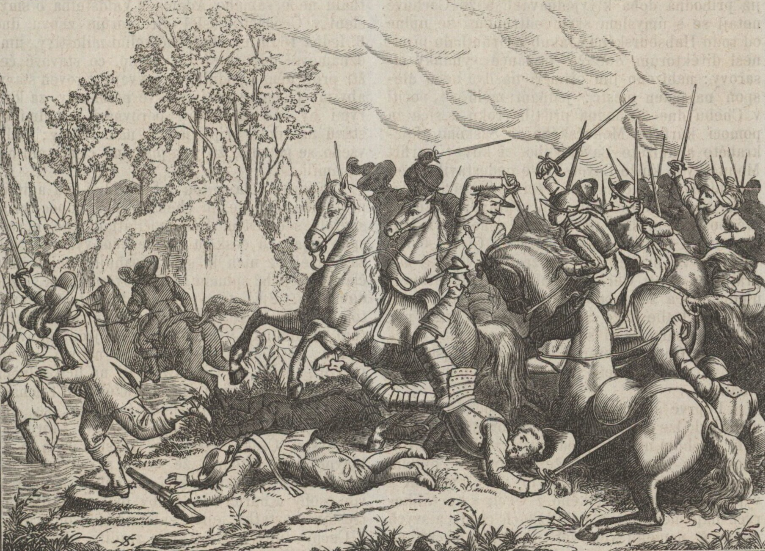
- Battle of Wisternitz (J. Scheiwl, 1881)
Date	5 August 1619
Location	Dolní Věstonice (present-day Czech Republic)
Result	Moravian victory

Belligerents
(Kingdom of Bohemia) Bohemian Confederation; Moravia	Holy Roman Empire; Royalists

Commanders and leaders
(Kingdom of Bohemia) Friedrich von Tiefenbach (Kingdom of Bohemia) Ladislav Velen ze Žerotína	(Holy Roman Empire) Henri de Dampierre

Strength
3,500	8,000–12,000

Casualties and losses
700	6,000

The Battle of Wisternitz or Dolní Věstonice was fought on 5 August 1619 between a Moravian force of the Bohemian Confederation under Friedrich von Tiefenbach (Teuffenbach) and a Habsburg army under Henri de Dampierre. The battle was a Moravian victory. The battle is part of the Thirty Years' War.

Budweis (České Budějovice) was one of the three towns which remained loyal to King Ferdinand of House Habsburg when Bohemia revolted. After the Habsburg victory at Sablat, the Bohemians were forced to raise the siege of České Budějovice. On 15 June 1619, Georg Friedrich of Hohenlohe-Neuenstein-Weikersheim retreated to Soběslav where he awaited reinforcement by Count Heinrich Matthias von Thurn.

After taking control of the strong places of southern Bohemia, Ferdinand sent a force under Dampierre to Moravia, which had chosen the side of the Bohemian rebels. However, Dampierre was defeated at Dolní Věstonice (German: Wisternitz) by Moravian forces under von Tiefenbach (brother of Rudolf von Tiefenbach) and Ladislav Velen ze Žerotína in August 1619, which left Moravia in the Bohemian camp.
