= Siege of Wolgast (1630) =

1630 Siege

- Part of the Thirty Years' War
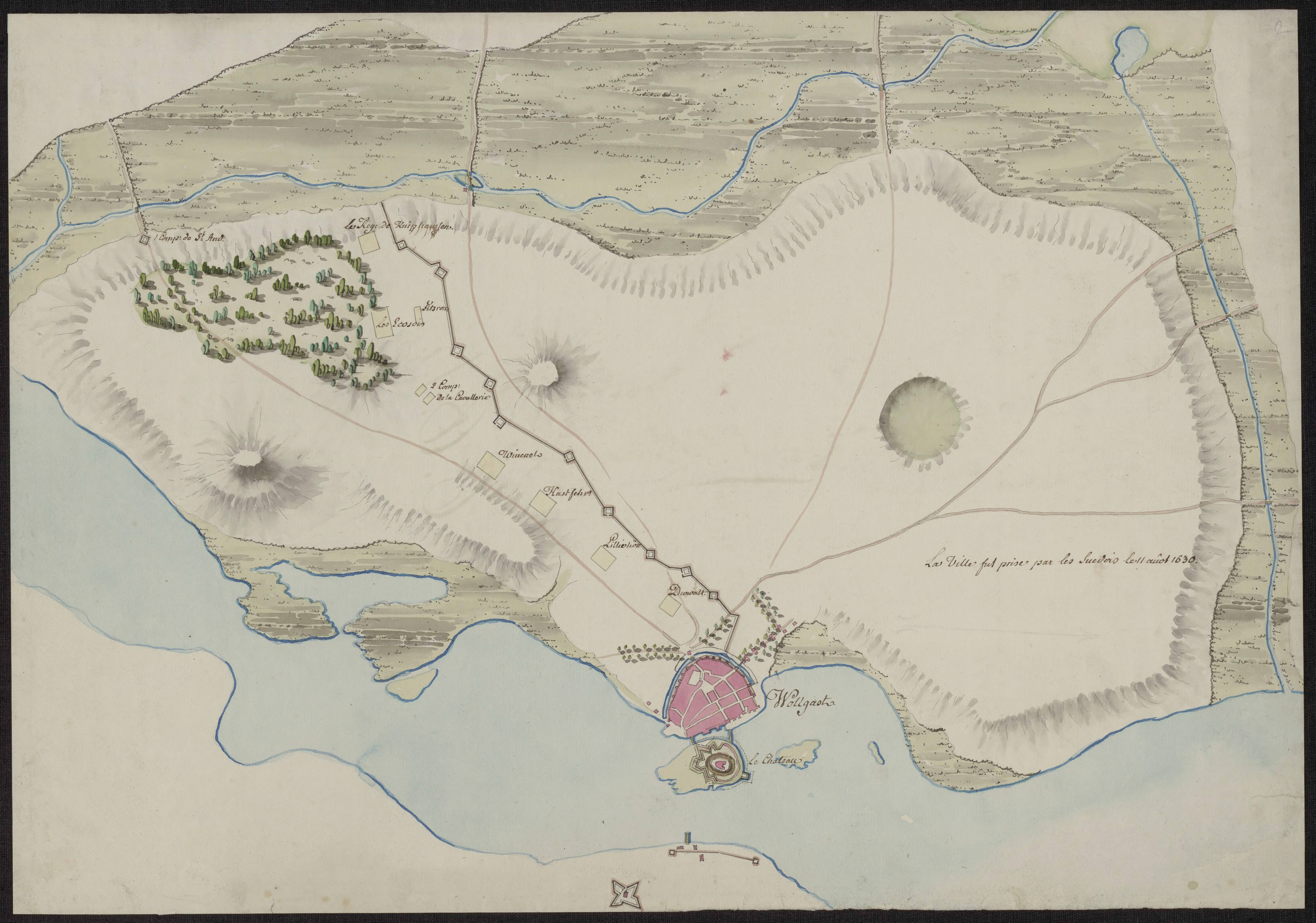
- A depiction of the Swedish siege of Wolgast
Date	June 30th – August 14th, 1630
Location	Wolgast, West Pomeranian Voivodeship 54°03′N 13°46′E
Result	Swedish victory
Territorial changes	Wolgast is captured by Swedish forces

Belligerents
(yes) Swedish Empire	Holy Roman Empire

Commanders and leaders
(yes) Dodo zu Knyphausen (yes) Lars Kagg (Swedish Empire) Arvid Forbus	(Holy Roman Empire) Federico Savelli? (Note: Possible commander of the relief)

Units involved
(Swedish Empire) Pori Regiment	Wolgast garrison

Strength
7,500 Men; 7,100 Infantry; 400 Cavalry	Unknown

Casualties and losses
Unknown	unknown

The Siege of Wolgast was a Swedish siege of the imperial Garrison of Wolgast during the Thirty Years' War.

== Background ==
After landing at Usedom on 25 June 1630, Gustavus Adolphus conquered the islands of Usedom and Wolin without resistance in late June and early July of. He then lead his army south and conquered Stettin. Several other towns around Pomerania were also conquered without a fight.

== Siege ==
Dodo zu Innhausen und Knyphausen, commander of Usedom, began the Siege of Wolgast shortly after the island was conquered. An attempted relief, possibly under the command of Federico Savelli, were thwarted when soldiers under Lars Kagg demolished the bridges in Treptow, Dömitz and Stolpe.

On 28 July the town was captured. This was followed by an order from the Swedes that the remaining soldiers in the town's castle should surrender, which they refused. When the Swedish siege works reached the castle and the threat of a storm became increasingly greater, the garrison was forced to surrender on 14 August and marched away with their troops. However, grain and provisions were left behind in the city.

== Sources ==
- Starbäck, Carl Georg & Bäckström, Per Olof (1885). Berättelser ur Svenska Historien, Volym 4
- Mankell, Julius (1854). Arkiv till upplysning om svenska krigens och krigsinrättningarnes historia
- Mankell, Julius (1865). Uppgifter rörande Svenska Krigsmagtens, styrka: sammansättning och fördelning sedan slutet af femtonhundratalet jemte öfversigt af Svenska krigshistoriens vigtigaste händelser under samma tid
- Dodge 1895

== See also ==
- Pomerania during the Early Modern Age
- Assault on Greifenhagen
- Wolgast
- Battle of Wolgast
- Siege of Wolgast
