= John Hepburn (soldier) =

Scottish professional soldier (1573–1651)

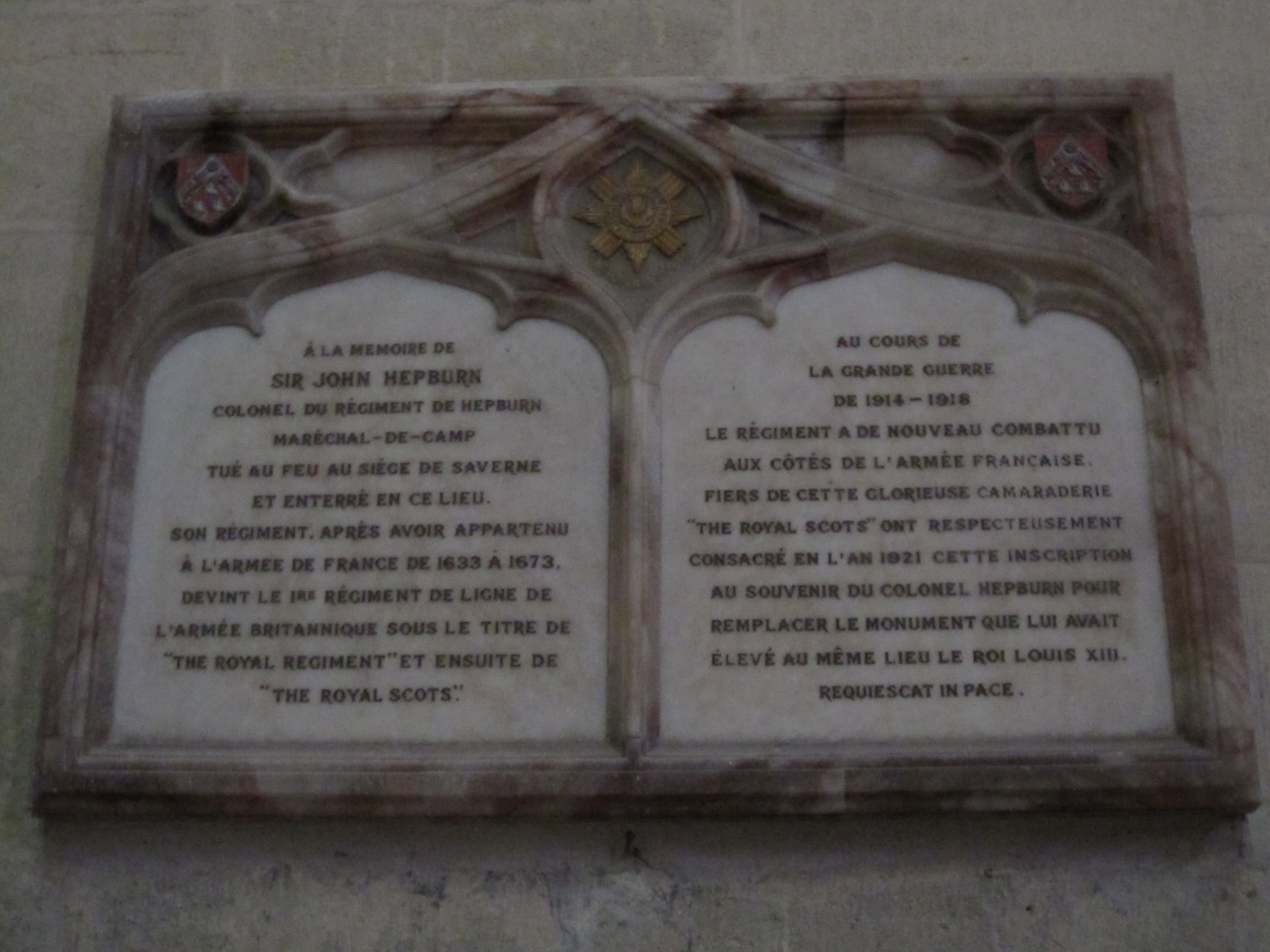
- Hepburn's commemorative plaque, Toul Cathedral

Governor of Rügenwald Castle
- In office 1630–1631

Personal details
- Born: c. 1598 Haddington, East Lothian
- Died: 8 July 1636 (aged 63) Saverne, France
- Parent(s): George and Helen Hepburn
- Education: University of St Andrews
- Occupation: Professional soldier

Military service
- Battles/wars: Thirty Years' War; Battle of White Mountain; Siege of Bergen; Fleurus; Polish–Swedish War (1621–1625); Polish–Swedish War (1626–1629); Battle of Gniew; Thirty Years' War; Frankfurt an der Oder; Breitenfeld; Battle of Werben

Sir John Hepburn (c. 1598 – 8 July 1636) was a professional soldier from East Lothian, who served with the Swedish and French armies. He was killed in action near Saverne in Alsace.

== Biography ==
=== Early life ===
John Hepburn was the 2nd son of George Hepburn of Athelstaneford, near the town of Haddington and his wife Helen Hepburn, daughter of Adam Hepburn of Smeaton. He probably studied at St Andrews in 1615, and then travelled to France with his friend, Robert Monro visiting Paris and Poitiers. Hepburn was one of the many thousands of Scots who served in the Thirty Years' War.

=== 1620s ===
In 1620 Sir Andrew Gray began to levy forces for the support of Queen Elizabeth of Bohemia, and he established his camp on Hepburn family property at Monkrig. John joined Gray's forces, leaving Scotland in May 1620, and thereafter commanded a company of pikes who served as the personal guard to the exiled King of Bohemia. After the defeat at White Mountain Gray's forces united with Ernst von Mansfeld's troops, and by 1622 Hepburn held the rank of captain. He served during the battles of Bergen op Zoom in July and of Fleurus in August 1622. It was after Mansfeld's forces were disbanded in 1623 that Hepburn and his troops entered Swedish service.

In 1625 Hepburn was appointed colonel of his own infantry troop at a salary of £380 per annum. He served with honour during Sweden's Prussian campaigns, particularly in the defence of Mewe against a Polish army of 30,000 in 1625. By 1627 his reputation was such that he became one of four Scottish colonels knighted that year by Gustav II Adolf, the others being Patrick Ruthven, Alexander Leslie and David Drummond.

=== 1630 - 1633 ===
In June 1630 Hepburn accompanied the Swedish king to Pomerania when the king initiated his German campaigns against the Habsburg Empire. Hepburn jointly commanded with Colonel Maximillian Teuffel at Colberg, which capitulated to Swedish forces in 1630. Hepburn became the governor of Rugenwalde castle, after he and 6 of his companies were sent there to relieve Monro and Tisenhusen in October 1630. Oxenstierna noted that at this point Hepburn was so competently in charge of his men that he had heard no complaints as the troops passed through Pomerania It was shortly after that that Hepburn requested that he be appointed a cavalry regiment as an injury he had received to the knee made the job of infantry colonel difficult. Monro noted that Hepburn's men were usually called upon by the King when troops were needed for particularly dangerous situations, thus in December 1630 4 of his companies were sent to join the royal army. Hepburn's forces became known as the Green Brigade. Hepburn proved very successful, as mentioned by Robert Monro, at the conquest at Landsberg/Warthe in April 1631. In September his troops distinguished themselves at battles at Frankfurt on the Oder and the Battle of Breitenfeld near Leipzig, where Hepburn was wounded. He commanded troops along with Sir James Lumsden and Donald Mackay, Lord Reay on the death of Colonel Teuffel.

In December 1631, Hepburn as eldest colonel had the honour of 'the Storm' of Oppenheim. The Swedish Intelligencer records his actions in Bavaria at Donauwörth and Harburg Bridge where he was seconded by English volunteers including Lord Craven. He also served as an interim governor for Landshut before taking on the same role in Munich.

While in Bavaria he took a force of 2000 musketeers to join with Gustav Adolf in pursuit of the Duke of Bavaria around the region of Sulzbach-Rosenberg. They hoped to surprise Bavaria before he could meet up with Wallenstein's forces. By the time Gustav Adolf called all his forces together he commanded six infantry brigades, three of which were controlled by Hepburn. The two armies taunted each other for some time and by July, the Swedish forces were back in Nürnberg. Disease and desertion took their toll on both sides so that the armies were both reduced in size with few being killed in the fighting. Shortly after this it appears that Hepburn and the Swedish king had a disagreement which caused Hepburn to resign from the Swedish army. Some sources record that Hepburn, being a staunch Roman Catholic coupled with his flamboyant personal style had always irked Gustav II Adolf, while others state it was because he was not given the rank of lieutenant-general, but the actual cause of the disagreement remains unknown. Hepburn was released by Gustav Adolf on 10 July 1632. Nonetheless, Hepburn remained in the field and took part in the battle of 24 August near Nurnberg as an observer (The Swedish Intelligencer describes his status there as being simply a volunteer). Thereafter Hepburn and a few other Scottish officers - Sir James Hamilton of Priestfield among them - returned to Scotland.

=== 1633 - 1636 ===
On 26 January 1633 Hepburn received his first commission from the French government. King Charles I's warrant for Hepburn's levy of 1200 men dates from 26 March and the entry in the Privy Council records dates from 24 April. Hepburn raised 2000 men in Scotland for French service, and was in command at the conquest of Lorraine and at the siege of Nancy. He continued his successful career, in Alsace and at the taking of de La Mothe castle in 1634. Hepburn was in charge of 6000 men at this time gaining the rank of Marschal de Camp. He then served in Germany under Marshal La Force, de Breze, and cardinal de la Valette, eventually joining with Duke Bernhard of Weimar's army in 1635. By March that year, the author of The Modern History of the World noted Hepburn as Field Marshal for the king of France's army. The rank did not exist as such, but his title was Marschal de Camp. He was soon after awarded the rank of Marshal of France while on campaign, though he died before he hard the news of his levation. During this period, Hepburn acted as an intermediary between the Swedes and the French military commanders. By this juncture his Régiment de Hebron had at its head three senior officers: the Colonel, Sir John Hepburn, Lieutenant-Colonel Munro, and Major Sir Patrick Monteith. It included 45 Captains, 1 Lieutenant-Captain, 45 Lieutenants, 48 Ensigns, 4 surgeons, 6 adjutants, 2 chaplains, 1 drum-major, 1 piper, 88 sergeants 288 corporals, 288 lance-corporals, 96 drummers and 48 companies each consisting of 150 musketeers and pikemen, totalling some 8,316 men.

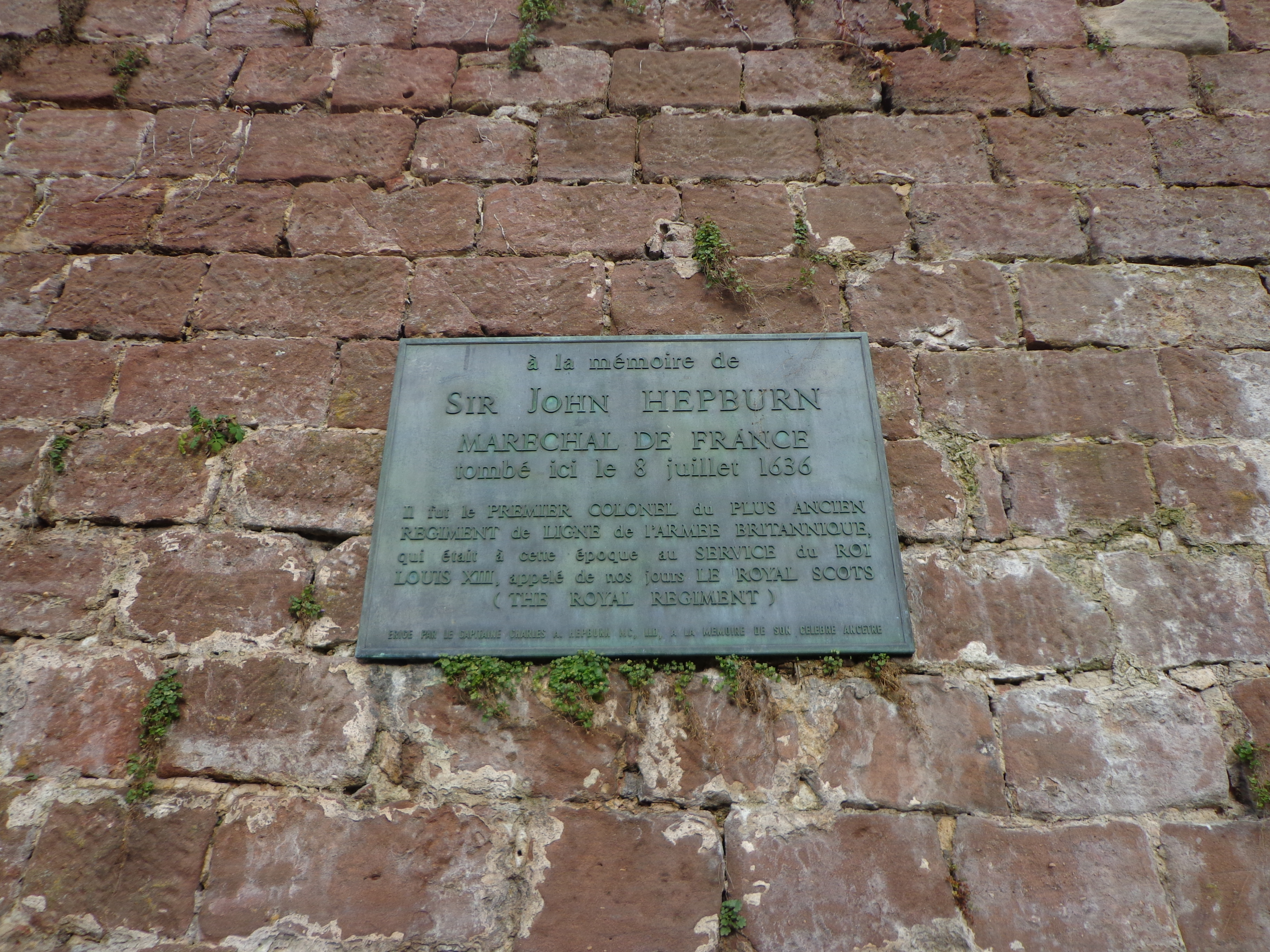
Plaque in Saverne marking the exact spot where Hepburn was killed.

=== 1636 death ===
On either 8 or 21 July 1636 Hepburn was killed by a gunshot wound to the neck during the siege of Saverne. He was buried along with his sword, helmet and spurs at Toul Cathedral in France. A monument, since destroyed, was erected there on the western side of the left transept. He appears not to have married or to have fathered any children. Andrew Hepburn, claiming to be the brother of both Colonel Sir John and Lieutenant Colonel Sir James Hepburn, petitioned the Scottish Privy Council in July 1636 for the right to claim their property and goods as the sole surviving heir.

Hepburn's French regiment, Régiment d’Hebron, later morphed into the modern Royal Scots regiment of the British Army.
