= First Battle of Steinau =

Part of the Thirty Years' War

- Part of Thirty Years' War
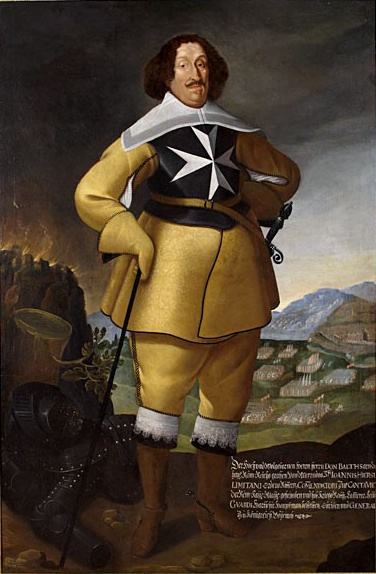
- Baltasar Marradas, the Imperial commander
Date	August 29 – September 4, 1632
Location	Steinau, Lower Silesia 51°24′40″N 16°25′23″E
Result	Swedish-Saxon Victory

Belligerents
(Electorate of Saxony) Saxony (yes) Swedish Empire Brandenburg	Holy Roman Empire

Commanders and leaders
(Electorate of Saxony) Hans Georg von Arnim-Boitzenburg (Swedish Empire) Jacob Duwall	(Holy Roman Empire) Baltasar Marradas

Strength
12,000 Saxons; 7,000 Swedes; 2,000 Brandenburgers (Note: At the start of the invasion)	20,000

Casualties and losses
Light	6,000 killed or captured

The First Battle of Steinau took place from August 29 to September 4, 1632, during the middle stages of the Swedish intervention in the Thirty Years’ War. An allied army of Saxons, Swedes, and Brandenburgers invaded Silesia with 21,000 troops, encountering an Imperial army of 20,000 at Ścinawa (German: Steinau an der Oder). The resulting battle was a major allied victory.

== Background ==
Following the victory at Breitenfeld the Saxons retook their territory and invaded Lusatia. The Swedish army took over large parts of Germany and won yet another victory at the Battle of Rain. To improve his own position in the alliance with Sweden, Johann Georg, the elector of Saxony, ordered to invade Silesia with 12,000 Saxons and 2,000 Brandenburgers under the command of Hans Georg von Arnim-Boitzenburg. Arnim's army was supported by 7,000 Swedish under the command of Jacob Duwall. The Imperials under the command of the elderly Spanish marshal Baltasar Marradas hurriedly gathered 20,000 men at Steinau, an important crossing on the Oder river.

== Aftermath ==
Following the battle, Arnim pressed on and took Breslau and Schweidnitz where he reverted re-Catholicization measures. The Imperialists were driven into the mountains. Arnim had conquered Silesia with fewer men and against greater odds than Frederick the Great's celebrated invasion in 1740.

Wallenstein decided to punish Saxony, so he sent General Heinrich Holk with 10,000 men to ravage Saxony.

== See also ==
- Siege of Nuremberg

== Sources ==
- Wilson, Peter H. (2009). Europe's Tragedy: A History of the Thirty Years War. Allen Lane. ISBN 978-0-7139-9592-3.
