= Battle of Frankfurt an der Oder =

1631 battle of the Thirty Years' War

Coordinates: 52°21′N 14°33′E

- Part of the Thirty Years' War
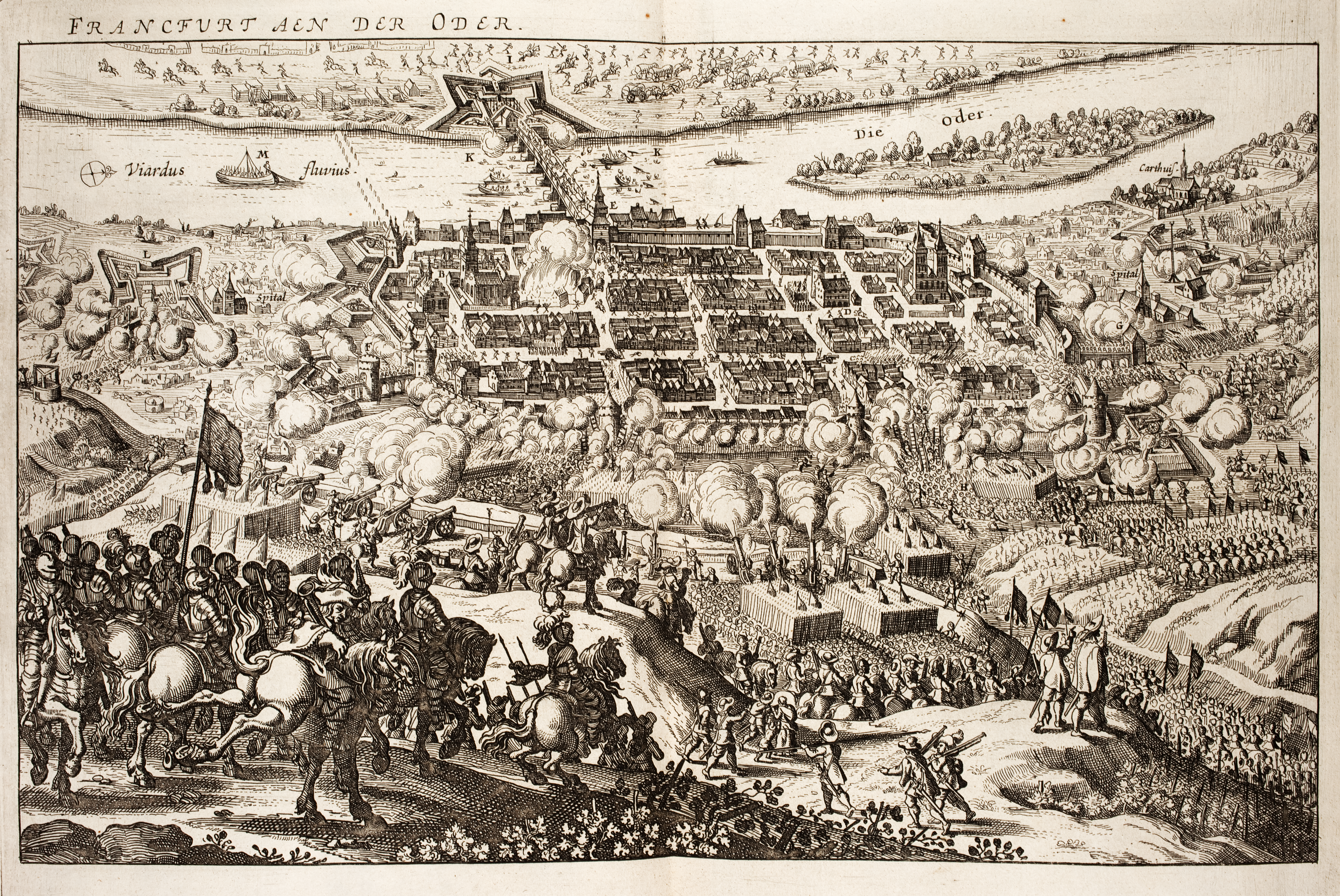
- Battle of Frankfurt an der Oder by Matthäus Merian (1642)
Date	13 April 1631 (Note: The battle is mentioned as happening on Palm Sunday 1631 in contemporary sources. This was on 13 April for congregations using the Gregorian calendar (most Catholic nations) and 3 April for those still using the Julian calendar. Krause & Balz (1993) give 15 April.)
Location	Frankfurt an der Oder, Margraviate of Brandenburg (present-day Brandenburg, Germany)
Result	Swedish victory

Belligerents
(yes) Swedish Empire	Holy Roman Empire; German Catholic League

Commanders and leaders
(Swedish Empire) Gustavus Adolphus (Swedish Empire) John Hepburn (Swedish Empire) Robert Monro	(Holy Roman Empire) Rudolf von Tiefenbach (Holy Roman Empire) Walter Butler (POW)

Strength
18,000	6,400

Casualties and losses
800 killed or wounded	3,000 killed
- Location within Brandenburg Frankfurt an der Oder (Germany)

The Battle of Frankfurt an der Oder on 13 April 1631 took place during the Thirty Years' War. The Imperial city of Frankfurt an der Oder was taken by a Swedish army, the first town within the Empire to be occupied outside Pomerania, where Sweden had established a bridgehead in 1630.

After a two-day siege, Swedish forces, including several regiments of Scottish auxiliaries, stormed the town. Possession of Frankfurt and the subsequent occupation of nearby Landsberg, secured the Swedish army's rear and allowed Gustavus Adolphus of Sweden to advance further into Central Germany.

== Prelude ==
Swedish king Gustavus Adolphus started to intervene in the Thirty Years' War by supporting Stralsund against Wallenstein in 1628, and landed in Pomerania in June 1630. With the central parts of the Duchy of Pomerania, Sweden had gained a bridgehead in the Holy Roman Empire's northeasternmost corner, while the rest of the empire was occupied by forces of the Catholic League and Ferdinand II, Holy Roman Emperor. Except for Magdeburg, which had allied with Sweden on 1 August, the German Protestant states distrusted Gustavus Adolphus and hesitated to enter an alliance.

In January 1631, Swedish forces garrisoned in the Pomeranian bridgehead proceeded southwards, and sacked the Pomeranian towns of Gartz (Oder) and Greifenhagen (now Gryfino) near Pomerania's border with Brandenburg. Further southward advances along the Oder into the territory of George William, Elector of Brandenburg followed, and on 23 January 1631, Sweden allied with France in the Treaty of Bärwalde, concluded in Brandenburgian Bärwalde (now Mieszkowice).

== Siege and storm of Frankfurt ==
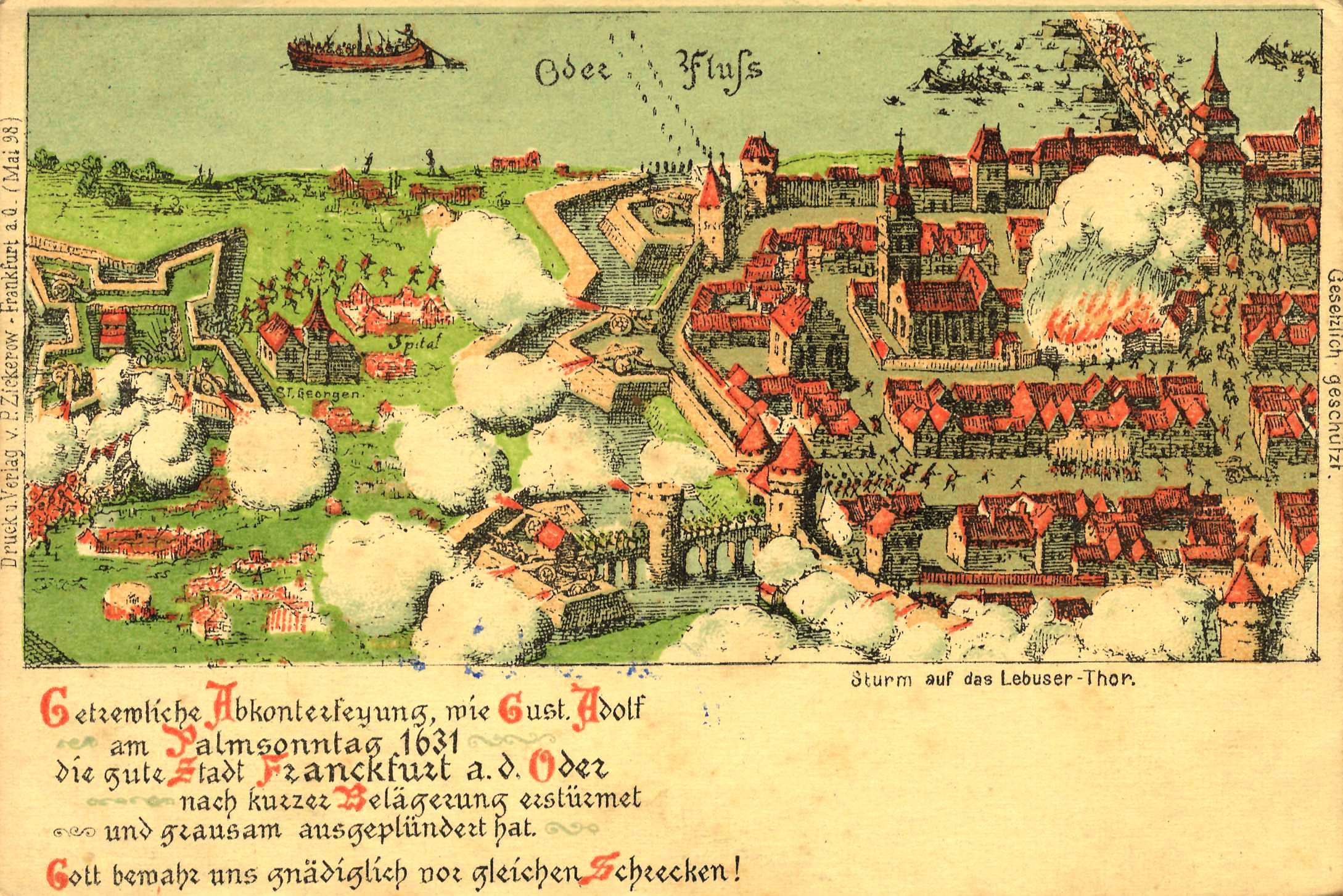
Offensive on Lebus Gate

The Swedish forces, commanded by Gustavus Adolphus, were supported by Scottish auxiliaries commanded by John Hepburn and Robert Monro. They laid siege on the town for two days, and stormed it on the second day. The assault was successful and resulted in the sack of the town. The success was in part due to internal quarrels in the defending force—mercenaries who had not been paid refused to fight without receiving their pay first. The defenders were "slaughtered [...] where they stood" and suffered 3,000 deaths, compared to 800 casualties on the Swedish side. Many deaths occurred when the town was looted.

== Aftermath ==
Scottish major general in Swedish service John Leslie was appointed governor of the town and gave orders to have its defenses strengthened and the thousands of bodies buried. The latter task was achieved by digging mass graves for over a hundred bodies each; after six days, all dead had been buried. John Leslie was soon succeeded as Frankfurt's governor by another Scot, James MacDougal, who was in turn succeeded by a third Scot, Alexander Leslie.

Frankfurt served to protect the rear of the advancing Swedish army. The other major town in northeastern Brandenburg, Landsberg (Warthe) (now Gorzow) was taken on 23 April. Subsequently, George William, Elector of Brandenburg was forced into treaties with Sweden on 14 May, 20 June, and 10 September 1631, which put Sweden in charge of the Brandenburgian military capacities, but did not have the status of an actual alliance. Throughout 1631, Gustavus Adolphus of Sweden advanced into central Germany, and while Magdeburg was lost in May and Gustavus Adolphus was hard-pressed at Werben in July, the subsequent victory at Breitenfeld in September paved the way for his advance into southern Germany.

== Sources ==
=== Bibliography ===
- Bröckling, Ulrich; Sikora, Michael (1998). Armeen und ihre Deserteure: Vernachlässigte Kapital einer Militärgeschichte der Neuzeit (in German). Vandenhoeck & Ruprecht. ISBN 3-525-01365-5.
- Brzezinski, Richard; Turner, Graham (2001). Lützen 1632: climax of the thirty years war. Volume 68 of Osprey campaign series. Osprey Publishing. ISBN 1-85532-552-7.
- Krause, Gerhard; Balz, Horst Robert (1993). Müller, Gerhard (ed.). Theologische Realenzyklopädie I (in German). De Gruyter. ISBN 3-11-013898-0.
- Lorenzen, Jan N. (2006). Die grossen Schlachten: Mythen, Menschen, Schicksale. Campus Verlag. ISBN 3-593-38122-2.
- Mackillop, Andrew; Murdoch, Steve (2003). Military governors and imperial frontiers c. 1600-1800: A study of Scotland and empires. BRILL. ISBN 90-04-12970-7.
- Parker, Geoffrey; Adams, Simon (1997). The Thirty Years' War (2 ed.). Routledge. ISBN 0-415-12883-8.
- Ringmar, Erik (1996). Identity, interest and action: A cultural explanation of Sweden's intervention in the Thirty Years War. Cambridge University Press. ISBN 0-521-56314-3.
- Yotov, Petko (1999). "Side-by-side Easter calendar reference for the 17th century". 5ko.free.fr.
