= Rudolf von Tiefenbach =

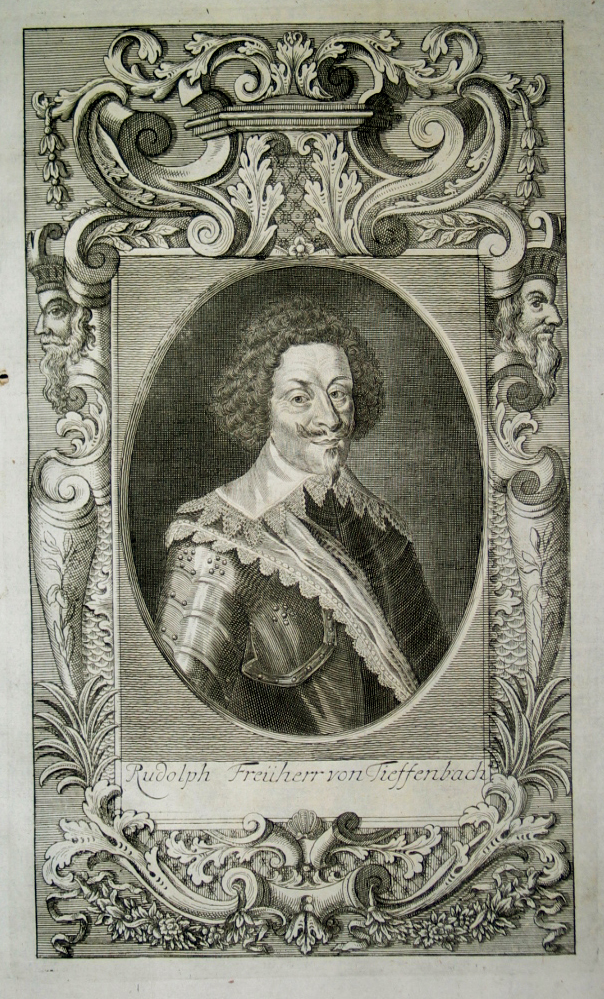
Rudolf von Tiefenbach

Rudolf von Tiefenbach (26 November 1582 – 4 March 1653) was a German military commander who served the Holy Roman Empire during the Thirty Years' War.

Despite being raised a protestant, Tiefenbach joined the catholic Habsburg army in 1613.

During the 1620 Battle of White Mountain, he led the 1st Division of the Imperial Army which included the cuirassier regiment of Albrecht von Wallenstein and the horse regiment of Jean de Gauchier. When Charles Bonaventure de Longueval, Count of Bucquoy died, Tiefenbach took over part of his command.

In 1631, after Torquato Conti retired from his post, Tiefenbach was elevated to the rank of Generalfeldmarschall by the Holy Roman Emperor.

In 1639 he was named a Knight of the Order of the Golden Fleece.
