= Assault on Greifenhagen =

Attack on Greifenhagen during the Thirty Years' War

- Part of the Thirty Years' War
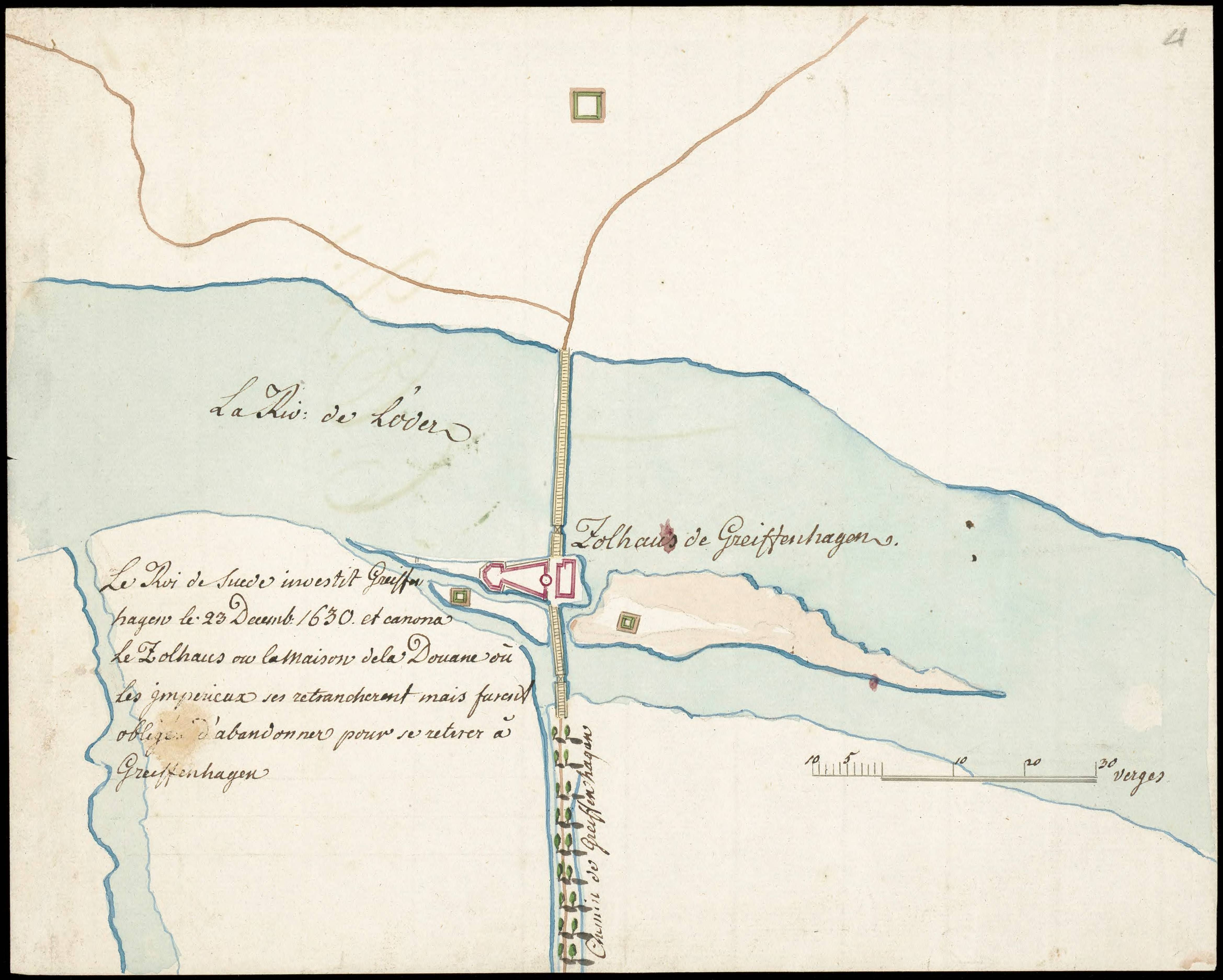
- Map of Greifenhagen from 1630 depicting the assault.
| Date | 25 December 1630 |
| Location | Greifenhagen (modern-day Gryfino), West Pomeranian Voivodeship 53°15′11″N 14°29′15″E |
| Result | Swedish victory |
| Territorial changes | Greifenhagen captured |

Belligerents
| Swedish Empire | Holy Roman Empire |

Commanders and leaders
| Gustavus Adolphus; Lennart Torstensson; Maximilian Teuffel; Alexander Leslie | Fernando da Capua (POW); Anthony (POW); Thurn (POW) |

Units involved
| Yellow Regiment | Greifenhagen garrison |

Strength
| 13,000–18,000 men 80 guns 5 ships | 1,500–2,500 men |

Casualties and losses
| Insignificant | c. 102 captured 40–50 killed |

The assault on Greifenhagen occurred on 25 December 1630 during the earlier stages of the Swedish intervention in the Thirty Years' War when a Swedish force of 13,000–18,000 men attacked the town of Greifenhagen in order to make way for an attack on the main Imperial camp at Gartz. The Swedes initially on arrival could not attack the town right away, and instead set up camp in the nearby forest. Once all the Swedish artillery had arrived, the walls of the town were shelled, eventually being breached. Despite repelling them twice, the Imperial garrison folded once a third assault under Gustavus Adolphus captured the main commander, Fernando da Capua. A Swedish flotilla in the nearby river, under the command of Alexander Leslie, attempted to cut off their retreat, though this was unsuccessful, with the Imperials managing to retreat at the price of heavy casualties.

== Background ==
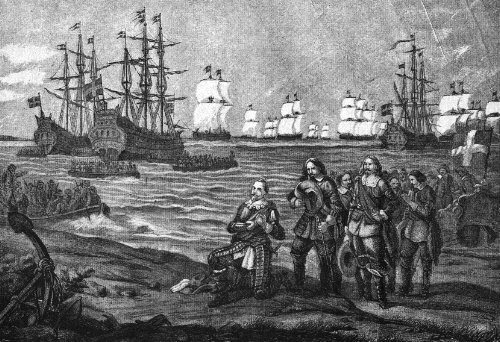
Depiction of Gustavus Adolphus landing in Germany at the start of his intervention.

After his initial landing in Pomerania in 1630, Gustavus Adolphus expanded his bridgehead, focusing on strengthening his positions in northern Germany. On 13 November of the same year, a battle broke out at Falkenberg between two Swedish and Imperial armies. It resulted in a victory for the Swedes, who continued their march westwards. Encouraged by the victory, Gustavus made the decision to attack the main Imperial camp situated at Gartz. To do this, he began marching towards Greifenhagen.

== Assault ==
On 23 December, the Swedish army of 13,000, 14,000, or 18,000 under Gustavus Adolphus assembled near Damm. It set out towards Greifenhagen the following day. The town had a garrison of 1,500–2,500 men, and its fortifications were poor, consisting of only a medieval wall and shallow moat. On the day of arrival, the Swedes were not able to assault the walls, due to half of their guns only arriving in the evening. After a minor skirmish, the garrison withdrew back into the town with the Swedes setting up camp in the nearby forest. On 25 December, a sermon was held, and then the artillery, 80 guns in total, was set up on the highest available hill. Meanwhile, Alexander Leslie followed the army with a flotilla of five militia river ships and boats at Reglitz.

Then, the Swedish artillery under the command of Lennart Torstensson began bombarding the city. Once a large enough hole had been created in the walls after a few hours, the Swedes, more specifically the so-called Yellow Regiment under the command of Maximilian Teuffel began flooding into the town and, according to one account, captured it. According to a different account, they met tough resistance from the commander, Fernando da Capua, who repelled the Swedes twice. Despite this, after a third assault led by the king himself, he was eventually captured along with Major Anthony, Count Thurn, some other officers and 100 soldiers. Additionally, 40–50 men were killed. During this time, Leslie had begun bombarding the town from the sea.

Leslie then took some men with him and cut off the imperial retreat on Reglitzer Bridge. The imperial cavalry was the first to give way, and their horses soon died under crossfire from the Swedish sharpshooters, leading to confusion. Despite this, the imperials successfully retreated with heavy losses.

== Aftermath ==
After the storming, on 27 December, the Swedes captured the Imperial camp, capturing more than 500 fully loaded wagons. Additionally, a battle occurred at Marwitz, resulting in yet another Swedish victory and the Imperial army being routed from Pomerania.

== See also ==
- Battle of Breitenfeld (1631) – Part of the Thirty Years' War

== Works cited ==
- Podruczny, Grzegorz [in Polish] (2019). "Siege activities during the Thirty Years' War and their impact on the construction of modern fortresses in Pommern, Neumark and Schlesien" (PDF). wnus.usz.edu.pl. Adam Mickiewicz University in Poznań.
- Wolke, Lars Ericson [in Swedish] (2022). Gustavus Adolphus, Sweden and the Thirty Years War, 1630–1632. Pen & Sword Books. ISBN 9781526749628.
- Ålund, O.W. (1894). Gustaf II Adolf: Ett trehundraårsminne berättadt för ung och gammal [Gustaf II Adolf: A tercentenary memory told to young and old] (in Swedish). Stockholm: Albert Bonnier.
- Cronholm, Abraham (1871). Sveriges historia under Gustaf II Adolfs regering [Sweden's history under Gustaf II Adolf's reign] (in Swedish). Stockholm: Joh. Beckman.
- Generalstaben (1936). Tyska kriget intill mitten av januari 1631 [The German war until mid-January 1631]. Sveriges krig 1611-1632 (in Swedish). Vol. 3. Stockholm: Generalstaben.
