= Charles Pope =

Charles Pope VC
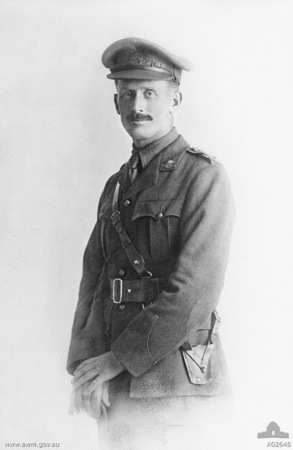
- Lieutenant Charles Pope c. 1917
- Born: 5 March 1883; Mile End, London, England
- Died: 15 April 1917 (aged 34); Louverval, France
- Burial place: Moeuvres Communal Cemetery Extension, France
- Military career
- Allegiance: Australia
- Branch: Australian Imperial Force
- Service years: 1915–17
- Rank: Lieutenant
- Units: 11th Battalion
- Conflicts: First World War; Gallipoli Campaign; Western Front; Battle of Arras; Battle of Lagnicourt †
- Awards: Victoria Cross

Charles Pope, VC (5 March 1883 – 15 April 1917) was an Australian recipient of the Victoria Cross, the highest award for gallantry in the face of the enemy that can be awarded to British and Commonwealth forces. He received the Victoria Cross posthumously for his actions on 15 April 1917 on the Western Front at the Battle of Lagnicourt, which took place during the First World War.

== Early life ==
Born in Mile End, London, on 5 March 1883, Charles Pope's parents were William, a Metropolitan Police constable, and Jane Pope (born Clark). He attended school in Navestock, Essex, before moving to Canada where he worked for Canadian Pacific Railways. He returned to England in 1906 and joined the Metropolitan Police. Later that year, at St Luke's Anglican Church in Chelsea, he married Edith Smith, with whom he later had two children, Edith Maude and Charles William. In 1910, Pope resigned from the police force and moved his family to Perth, Western Australia. He took up work as a furniture salesman and then took on a role in the insurance sector.

== Military career ==
Amidst the backdrop of the First World War, Pope enlisted with the Australian Imperial Force (AIF) on 31 August 1915, volunteering to serve overseas as part of Australia's commitment to the First World War. Assigned as a reinforcement to 11th Battalion, which had been formed largely from Western Australians and was at the time fighting at Gallipoli, after training he was quickly made a sergeant. By February 1916, he was commissioned as a second lieutenant and four months later sailed for England, to join the battalion, which had been transferred to Europe following its evacuation from Gallipoli, along with a batch of reinforcements. Sailing on HMAT Ajana, he arrived at Plymouth on 1 September 1916.

On 9 December 1916, Pope arrived on the Western Front reporting to the 11th Battalion, which was camped around Bazentin le Grand for the winter having fought at Pozières and Mouquet Farm earlier in the year. Later that month he was promoted to lieutenant and in early 1917 he attended the divisional school. Pope subsequently fought in actions around Flers, Le Barque, and Ligny–Thilloy. On 15 April 1917 at Louverval, France, during the Battle of Lagnicourt, he was in command of a very important picquet post, with orders to hold it at all costs amidst a heavy German attack. The enemy, in greatly superior numbers, attacked and surrounded the post and ammunition was running short. Pope, in a desperate bid to save the position, was "seen to charge with his men into a superior enemy force, by which they were overpowered", although heavy losses were inflicted. He had "obeyed the order to hold out to the last" and his lifeless body, along with those of most of his men, was found amongst 80 enemy dead.

The 11th Battalion, despite suffering over 245 casualties, was subsequently able to hold their sector of the line. For his actions Pope was awarded a posthumous Victoria Cross. The award was announced in The London Gazette on 8 June 1917. The full citation for his VC reads as follows:

For most conspicuous gallantry and devotion to duty when in command of a very important picquet post in the sector held by his battalion, his orders being to hold this post at all costs.

After the picquet post had been heavily attacked, the enemy in greatly superior numbers surrounded the post. Lt. Pope, finding that he was running short of ammunition, sent back for further supplies. But the situation culminated before it could arrive, and in the hope of saving the position, this very gallant Officer was seen to charge with his picquet into a superior force, by which it was overpowered.

By his sacrifice Lt. Pope not only inflicted heavy loss on the enemy, but obeyed his order to hold the position to the last. His body, together with those of most of his men, was found in close proximity to eighty enemy dead–a sure sign of the gallant resistance which had been made.

He is buried at Moeuvres Communal Cemetery Extension in France, while his Victoria Cross is displayed at the Australian War Memorial in Canberra.

== Legacy ==
The Charles Pope ward at the former Repatriation General Hospital, Hollywood is named in his honour.

== Bibliography ==
- Belford, Walter (1992) [1940]. "Legs-Eleven": Being the Story of the 11th Battalion (A.I.F.) in the Great War of 1914–1918. Swanbourne: John Burridge Military Antiques. OCLC 221479550.
- Gill, Ian (2004). Fremantle to France: 11th Battalion A.I.F. 1914–1919 (2nd ed.). Myaree, Western Australia: Advance Press. ISBN 0-9750588-0-0.
- Gliddon, Gerald (2012) [1998]. Arras and Messines 1917. VCs of the First World War. The History Press. ISBN 978-0-7524-6604-0.
