= 11th Battalion (Australia) =

Infantry battalion of the Australian Army

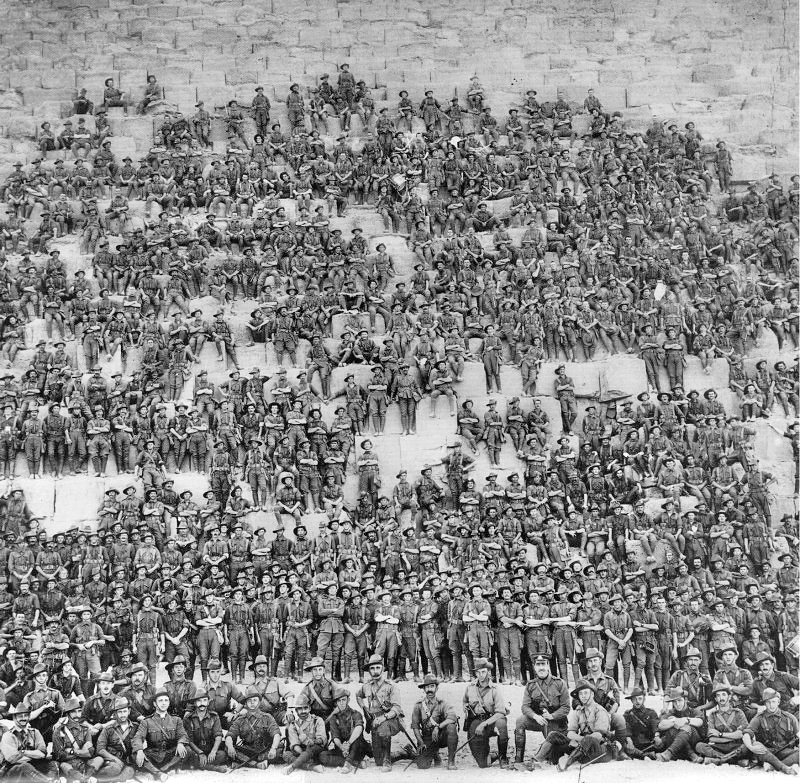
- Soldiers of 11th Battalion posing on the Great Pyramid of Giza on 10 January 1915, prior to the landing at Gallipoli
- Active: 1914–1919; 1921–1946; 1967–1987
- Country: Australia
- Branch: Australian Army
- Type: Infantry
- Size: ~800–1,000 personnel
- Part of: 3rd Brigade, 1st Division; 13th Brigade, 4th Division
- Garrison/HQ: Perth, Western Australia
- Motto: Vigilans
- Colours: Brown over light blue
- Engagements: World War I: Gallipoli campaign; Western Front; World War II: New Britain Campaign

Insignia
- Unit colour patch

The 11th Battalion was an Australian Army battalion that was among the first infantry units raised during World War I for the First Australian Imperial Force. It was the first battalion recruited in Western Australia, and following a brief training period in Perth, the battalion sailed to Egypt where it undertook four months of intensive training. In April 1915 it took part in the invasion of the Gallipoli Peninsula, landing at Anzac Cove. In August 1915 the battalion was in action in the Battle of Lone Pine. Following the withdrawal from Gallipoli, the battalion returned to Egypt where it was split to help form the 51st Battalion. In March 1916, the battalion was deployed to the Western Front in France and Belgium where it took part in trench warfare until the end of the war in November 1918.

The battalion was disbanded in 1919, but since 1921 has been re-activated and merged several times as a reserve unit, initially as the 11th Battalion (City of Perth Regiment), which fought a brief campaign against the Japanese on New Britain during World War II. Other units that have maintained the traditions of the original 11th Battalion include the 11th/44th Battalion (City of Perth Regiment), 'A' (City of Perth) Company, 1st Battalion, Royal Western Australia Regiment and the current 11th/28th Battalion, Royal Western Australia Regiment.

== World War I ==
=== Formation ===
The 11th Battalion was formed on 17 August 1914, less than two weeks after the declaration of war on 4 August, and was among the first infantry units raised during World War I for the all-volunteer First Australian Imperial Force. Along with the 9th, 10th and 12th Battalions, it formed Colonel Ewen Sinclair-MacLagan's 3rd Brigade, which was assigned to the 1st Division. The first battalion raised in Western Australia, under the command of Lieutenant Colonel James Lyon-Johnston, the 11th concentrated at Blackboy Hill, Western Australia. Drawing personnel from around the state with the majority coming from Perth and the goldfields, recruits came from all elements of society, with the majority being former labourers and agricultural workers or miners. Seventy-three percent of original enlistments were Australian-born, with the remaining recruits being mainly English-born with smaller numbers coming from other parts of the British Isles. By 24 September it had reached its authorised strength of 1,023 officers and other ranks. On formation, the battalion consisted of eight rifle companies, designated 'A' to 'H', and a headquarters company with signals, transport, medical and machine-gun sections.

The majority of the battalion's non-commissioned officers were long-serving Citizens Forces soldiers or regular personnel. Some had previously fought in South Africa during the Boer War and others had previously served in the British Army. Rudimentary training was undertaken at Bellevue, Western Australia, and at the end of October it sailed from Fremantle on the SS Ascanius and SS Medic. Originally bound for the United Kingdom, where they were to complete training, after stopovers in the Cocos Islands and Colombo, their orders were changed due to concerns about overcrowding in training camps in the United Kingdom and at the start of December, the battalion arrived at Mena Camp in Cairo, Egypt. There, the battalion's eight companies were reorganised into the four that existed under the British Army establishment and further training was undertaken. The battalion remained in Egypt until early March 1915 when it sailed on SS Suffolk and SS Nizam from Alexandria to the island of Lemnos in the Aegean Sea, in preparation for the Landing at Anzac Cove.

=== Gallipoli ===
==== Landing at Anzac Cove ====
On 24 April 1915, the battalion disembarked from Suffolk and boarded HMS London, which was bound for Gallipoli in the Dardanelles. At 4:30 on the morning of 25 April, 'A' and 'C' Companies of the battalion landed at North Beach, north of Ari Burnu Knoll, a mile south of Fisherman's Hut, on the left flank of the first wave. Under heavy machine gun and rifle fire, the battalion stormed the cliffs, driving the Turks back. However, the battalion became disorganised during the landing and mixed with other units. Small sections of the battalion were engaged in firefights all along the Australian front. Major Edmund Drake-Brockman, one of the battalion's senior officers, tried to sort the scattered men into their battalions: 9th on the right, 10th in the middle and 11th on the left. Meanwhile, the second half of the battalion landed further north of the first wave, directly under heavy machine-gun fire from Turks fully prepared and alerted by the first wave.

Over the next few days, the battalion dug in on the first and second ridges under heavy fire from the Turks. Casualties were heavy, but a defensive line was established. On 30 April, the battalion was withdrawn and moved into reserve on the beach. The next day, it reoccupied its section of the front. At this stage, the battalion was 450-strong. By 1 May, 30 officers and 940 other ranks from the battalion had landed.

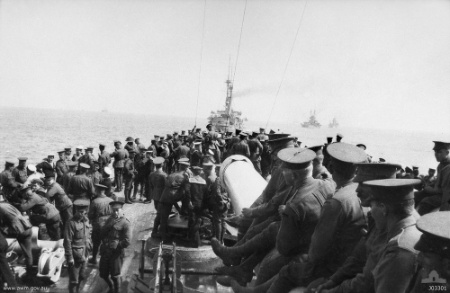
Troops from the Australian 11th and 12th Battalions on board HMS London en route to Gallipoli. 24 April 1915. AWM Photo

==== Raid on Gaba Tepe ====
On 4 May 1915, a party of 100 men from the battalion, led by Captain Raymond Leane and a detail of engineers, launched an unsuccessful attack on a Turkish fort at Gaba Tepe, which was being used to observe artillery fire onto Australian positions around Anzac Cove. The Turks opened heavy fire on the party which was forced to withdraw. The Australians lost four killed, including an officer, and 19 others were wounded. The raid was the AIF's first of the war. At this point, the battalion estimated that it had suffered 38 killed, 200 wounded and 197 missing. On 15 May, the battalion received 244 reinforcements, bringing its total strength to 23 officers and 723 other ranks.

In the early morning on 19 May, Turkish forces launched an attack against the left flank of the Australian lines, which developed into a major battle along the whole Australian front. The attack was repulsed with heavy losses. The 11th Battalion suffered nine killed and eight wounded, mainly from shrapnel. One Turkish officer and five soldiers surrendered. On 21 May, a truce was declared and a burial party from the 12th Battalion was sent out. However, it was fired at by the Turks and as a result burial parties were discontinued. A similar truce was declared on 24 May. A line was drawn halfway between the two lines and each side sent out parties to bury the dead and collect equipment.

==== Lone Pine ====
On 27 July 1915, after two weeks in reserve, the battalion relieved the 12th Battalion at Tasmanian Post, on the right on the Australian front line. On 31 July, a party of around 200 men led by Leane were ordered to capture a section of Turkish trenches in front of the battalion's position. After engineers detonated three mines prepared near Turkish communications trenches, the storming party captured the Turkish trench following a bayonet charge, with the loss of one officer and 36 other ranks killed. Seventy-three other members of the battalion were wounded during the attack, including Leane, who was mentioned in despatches. Turkish casualties were estimated by the battalion to be 60 killed.

On 6 August, the battalion held off a fierce Turkish counterattack on the trench, which became known as "Leane's Trench" during the Battle of Lone Pine. Heavy casualties were sustained on both sides. The battalion suffered 41 killed, 94 wounded and 19 missing. By the end of the month, the 11th Battalion's strength, despite having received six batches of reinforcements, had fallen to just over 500 men, approximately half its authorised strength. The following month, command of the battalion passed to Leane when Lyon-Johnston took over as brigade commander. As the health of the men deteriorated, the battalion's strength fell further to just over 300. The arrival of winter in October brought heavy rain and even harsher conditions.

==== Withdrawal ====
In November, the battalion supported the 5th Light Horse around "Chatham Post" until it was withdrawn, with the 9th Battalion, from Anzac Cove. The withdrawal had been planned for the 14th, but due to bad weather this was delayed until the night of the 16/17 November 1915. From Anzac Cove, it sailed to Lemnos where it recuperated at Sampi Camp, following seven months in the trenches. The battalion's war diary records particularly bad weather on Lemnos during this period, noting "Mudros seems a most unsuitable place to send troops for a rest". During this rest period, the battalion reported its first and only case of diphtheria, following which the whole brigade was quarantined. On 17 December, the battalion's last casualty of the campaign, a soldier named Private Hayes, died from meningitis. The battalion lost a total of 353 men killed during the campaign.

=== Western Front ===
In early 1916, the battalion sailed to Alexandria on the Empress of Britain. From Alexandria, it travelled by train to bivouac at Tall al Kabir. At this time, the battalion received 367 reinforcements from Australia before undertaking defensive duties around Gebel Habieta, guarding the Suez Canal. In February, the AIF was re-organised and expanded. This saw the veteran battalions split to provide cadres for new battalions and as a part of this process, the 11th Battalion provided personnel to the 51st Battalion, by transferring the even numbered sections to the new battalion. At this time, the battalion received four Lewis Guns for organic direct fire support.

On 30 March 1916, as the AIF's infantry divisions were transferred to Europe, the battalion sailed from Alexandria aboard the HMT Corsican. It arrived at Marseille, France, on 5 April and then moved by train to Flêtre where it was billeted until the 19th when it moved to Sailly, where it commemorated Anzac Day on 25 April. In mid-May, after a period of acclimatisation and training to prepare them for the European battlefield, the 11th Battalion moved up to the front line around Petillon in the Fleurbaix sector, with a strength of 27 officers and 929 other ranks. A further draft of reinforcements, totalling 69 men all ranks, arrived on 25 May, and on 30 May the battalion had its first experience of combat on the Western Front. Late that evening, German artillery bombarded the Allied line around the Cordonnerie salient, before infantry launched a raid on the 11th Battalion's trenches. In the fighting that followed the 11th Battalion lost four men captured, 37 killed and 70 wounded.

==== Pozières and Mouquet Farm ====
Throughout June, the 11th Battalion was placed in support of the front as it was brought back up to strength. At this time, the battalion's organic fire support was increased by the addition of two extra Lewis Guns. The following month, they moved to the Somme and were committed to the fighting around Pozières. After arriving at Albert on 19 July amidst a gas attack, the battalion spent the next couple of days preparing to attack, working to improve trenches and cache stores, during which they were subjected to heavy artillery bombardment. The attack was put in just before midnight on 23 July and was a costly success. Amidst heavy casualties, the 11th Battalion took the forward German trenches and amidst the confusion of the fighting advanced beyond their limit of exploitation, entering Pozières and moving beyond where they became embroiled in close quarters fighting. After capturing five artillery pieces, the battalion's officers and non-commissioned officers eventually managed to regain control of the advance and the battalion was brought back into a defensive line along their first objective. At dawn, patrols from the battalion entered the village again and cleared out the cellars beneath the battered remains of the village's buildings, capturing over 40 prisoners.

During the night of 24/25 July, the Australians attacked again, but after establishing a new defensive line, the 11th was forced to withdraw after suffering heavily from both friendly and enemy shelling. In the morning of 25 July, further casualties were sustained by German artillery. German infantry then launched a counterattack on the battalion's right, but the Australians managed to hold their ground. They remained in the line throughout the day, before the 19th Battalion arrived as part of the 5th Brigade's relief of the 3rd Brigade. Having lost 19 officers and 512 other ranks killed, wounded or missing, the battalion had suffered the most of all the 3rd Brigade's battalions and was moved back to Berteaucourt to be rebuilt.

After re-organising, in mid-August the 11th Battalion moved to La Boisselle where they were placed into brigade reserve. Just before dawn on 21 August, about 200 men from the 11th took part in an attack around Mouquet Farm; casualties amounted to 20 killed and 40 wounded and afterwards the battalion was moved to Belgium. The 11th Battalion spent the remainder of 1916 in the Ypres sector, in Flanders, but was moved back to the Somme at the end of the year as the worst winter in 40 years descended on the front.

==== Louverval ====
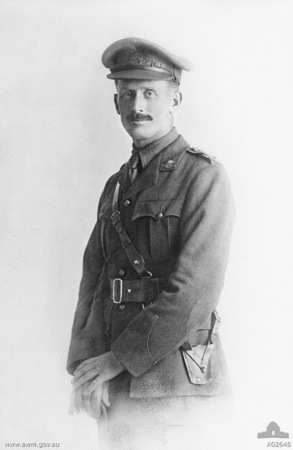
Lieutenant Charles Pope, the 11th Battalion's sole Victoria Cross recipient.

In early 1917, the Germans fell back towards the Hindenburg Line in an effort to shorten their lines and move into prepared positions. As the Allies pursued the withdrawing Germans, in late February the 11th Battalion captured Le Barque, conducting mopping-up operations before advancing to Thilloy where they fought a minor engagement before being relieved by the 3rd Battalion, having lost 12 killed and 30 wounded during the fighting and a further 10 men killed and 13 wounded by artillery. Sickness also took a heavy toll during this time due to the bad weather. In March, Lieutenant Colonel Rupert Rafferty took over as commanding officer and the following month, as the Allied line was pushed further forward towards the Hindenburg Line, the 11th Battalion played a supporting role during the 3rd Brigade's attack around Boursies, before occupying the front around the village of Louverval. On 15 April 1917, during the Battle of Lagnicourt, Lieutenant Charles Pope, of 'A' Company, was in command of an important picket post on the right of the battalion's positions outside Louverval, with orders to "hold the position at all costs". The Germans attacked the position with overwhelming numbers and surrounded the post. Having used up their ammunition, the remainder of the post charged with fixed bayonets into the surrounding German positions. Pope's body was later found with those of his men, having killed 80 Germans. Pope was posthumously awarded the Victoria Cross, Australia's highest award for gallantry in the face of the enemy.

==== Bullecourt and the Third Battle of Ypres ====
In early May, the 11th Battalion moved to Norieul, where they occupied a recently captured portion of the German line. A couple of days later, during the Second Battle of Bullecourt, their position was attacked by German "shock troops". In response to the attack, supporting artillery was called down, and the attack repulsed. The Germans laid down a heavy bombardment in retaliation. An attack was ordered, but the order was rescinded when the senior officer in the forward trench, Major Aubrey Darnell, expressed concerns about the state of the soldiers in the assault wave. The Germans then put in another attack, which was once again turned back, before the 11th launched a limited counterattack and regained the ground that had been lost. The battalion, having lost 68 men killed, two captured and 140 wounded, was down to a strength of just over 400 men. They were relieved and then moved back to Bapaume, where they received a draft of over 100 reinforcements.

Over the next couple of months, the battalion was rebuilt, reaching a strength of 44 officers and 1,002 other ranks by late August. The following month they were committed to the Third Battle of Ypres. Their first attack came around Glencorse Wood on 20 September, during which the 11th Battalion lost 46 killed and 100 wounded, before moving to Westhoek Ridge in early October. Another move saw them transferred to Broodeseinde Ridge, where they conducted a raid on German positions around Celtic Wood on 6/7 October in concert with the 12th Battalion. The following day, the 11th Battalion moved to a position on "Anzac Ridge", before later moving to Zonnebeke at the end of the month where they suffered heavy casualties from German artillery. Throughout November and the first part of December, the battalion remained out of the line, resting around Bologne, before returning to the front around Messines in late December, remaining there over New Years. The battalion's strength during this time was 32 officers and 687 other ranks.

==== German Spring Offensive and the final Hundred Days ====
In early 1918, after the capitulation of the Russian Empire the Germans, having moved the bulk of their forces to the Western Front, launched the Spring Offensive, striking against the British forces in the Somme. The initial onslaught pushed the Allied forces back and the Australian divisions, which had been merged into the Australian Corps, were thrown into the line in an effort to stem the tide. In early March, the 11th Battalion moved to the Hollebeke sector, where they were subjected to gas attacks before being sent south to Amiens at the start of April, joining the rest of the 1st Division in defence of Hazebrouck in the middle of the month. For the next couple of months the battalion rotated through the line in a defensive role as the German offensive was blunted. In June, as the Allies sought to regain some of the initiative, they undertook a series of Peaceful Penetration raids. On 2 June, the 11th Battalion attacked Mont de Merris, which resulted in the capture of a large amount of German equipment and over 200 prisoners for the loss of 16 men killed and 74 wounded. A lesser attack was launched on the German trenches opposite the battalion on 22 June. Around this time, a small group of US soldiers was attached to the 11th Battalion to gain experience. The following month, the battalion captured Gerbedoen Farm before supporting the 10th Battalion's successful attack on Merris.

On 8 August, the Allies launched their own offensive, known as the Hundred Days Offensive, around Amiens. The 11th Battalion did not take part in the opening phase of the offensive, moving to Hamel and establishing themselves in a defensive position around Harbonnieres. On 10 August, the battalion was committed to a strong attack around Lihons; although successful, the attack lasted three days and resulted in heavy casualties, including 58 killed and 140 wounded. On the night of 12/13 August, the 11th was withdrawn to the support line just behind the front. Later, they were moved to Vaire and then Cerisy, before supporting the 9th and 12th Battalions around Chuignolles and Proyart on 23 August and then around Chuignes and Cappy two days later, where further losses were experienced. The 11th Battalion's final attack came against the Hindenburg Outpost Line on 18 September when they launched a three-company attack around Fervaque Farm and Carpeza Copse near Villeret. Despite being severely understrength – each company had an average strength of just 76 men – they advanced over 3,000 yards (2,700 m) and took over 120 prisoners and large quantities of German equipment, for the loss of 18 men killed. Further casualties came on 24 October when German aircraft attacked the battalion headquarters, killing a number of officers, including Darnell, who was the acting commanding officer. The heavy casualties that the Australians had suffered during the final year of the war, and the decrease in volunteers arriving from Australia, meant that the battalion was desperately understrength. In October, they were withdrawn from the line for rest and reorganisation, at the insistence of the Australian prime minister, Billy Hughes. At this time, the battalion was reorganised into a two-company structure. In early November, the battalion prepared to return to the front around St. Quentin, but before they could return to the fighting, an armistice came into effect, bringing the war to an end.

By the end of the war, a total of over 9,000 men had served in the 11th Battalion, of which 1,115 were killed and 2,424 wounded. Members of the battalion received the following decorations for their service during the war: one Victoria Cross, one Companion of the Order of the Bath, two Companions of the Order of St Michael and St George, seven Distinguished Service Orders, one Officer of the Order of the British Empire, 30 Military Crosses and one Bar, 25 Distinguished Conduct Medals with one Bar, 96 Military Medals with two Bars, three Meritorious Service Medals, 85 Mentions in Despatches and seven foreign awards. Following the armistice, the 11th Battalion was moved to Chaelet, in Belgium, where the demobilisation process began. The battalion's personnel were slowly repatriated to Australia, while those that waited undertook training to prepare them for civilian life. On 6 February 1919, the 11th Battalion was amalgamated with the 12th, to form the 11th/12th Battalion; a further amalgamation occurred on 27 March when the 11th/12th merged with the 9th/10th Battalion, forming the 3rd Australian Infantry Brigade Battalion. A short time later, the battalion disbanded. The 11th Battalion's final commanding officer was Major Jack O'Neil, an original member of the battalion who had been appointed a company sergeant major during the battalion's formative period at Blackboy Camp.

== Inter war years and World War II ==
In 1921, following the conclusion of the demobilisation of the AIF, the government undertook a review of Australia's military requirements and the part-time military force, the Citizens Forces, was reorganised to perpetuate the numerical designations of the AIF units. As a result, the 11th Battalion was reformed in Perth, drawing personnel and lineage from the 2nd Battalion, 11th Infantry Regiment and the 2nd Battalion, 51st Infantry Regiment. Upon formation, the battalion was assigned to the 13th Brigade, and inherited the battle honour of "South Africa, 1899–1902", which it bore for the 1st and 2nd Battalions, West Australian Infantry. In 1927, territorial designations were introduced and the battalion adopted the title of the "Perth Regiment"; it was also awarded battle honours for World War I, receiving a total of 23. Its motto at this time was Vigilans.

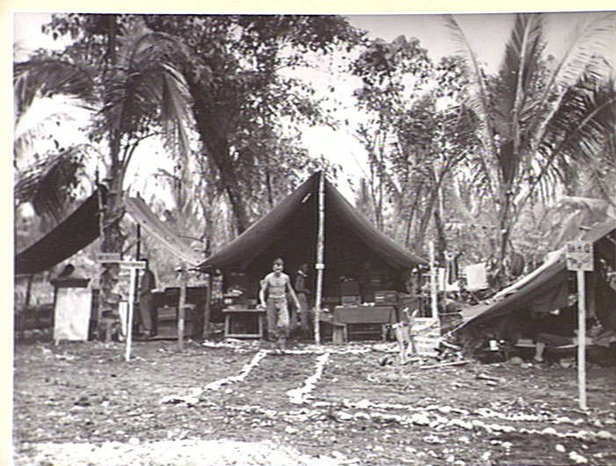
Battalion headquarters at Jacquinot Bay, New Britain, December 1944

Upon establishment, the Citizens Forces units were manned through both voluntary and compulsory service; but, in 1929–30, following the election of the Scullin Labor government, the compulsory service scheme was abolished and the Citizens Forces was replaced with an all volunteer "Militia". As a result of the economic pressures of the Great Depression the number of volunteers fell, and consequently a number of infantry battalions had to be disbanded or amalgamated. The 11th Battalion was one of those amalgamated, being joined with the 16th Battalion in 1930 to become the 11th/16th Battalion. The two units remained linked until 1 October 1936, when the 11th Battalion (City of Perth Regiment) was re-formed in its own right, as part of an expansion of the Militia due to concerns about war in Europe.

During World War II, like most Militia units, the 11th Battalion performed garrison duties for most of the war. It was mobilised for war service at Melville, Western Australia, in December 1941. In the early part of the war, the battalion remained in Western Australia, and was assigned to the 4th Division, as part of the 13th Brigade, before later moving to the Northern Territory in 1943, where the 13th Brigade was deployed to defend Darwin, replacing the 3rd Brigade. Later in 1943, the battalion was gazetted as an AIF battalion, after more than 65 percent of its personnel volunteered to serve outside Australian territory. As the threat to Darwin passed, its garrison was reduced and the 13th Brigade was reorganised to prepare it for operations in the Pacific. The battalion, along with the rest of the 13th Brigade, was later transferred to the 5th Division and saw service against the Japanese during 1945 in the New Britain Campaign. Due to the large size of Japanese forces on New Britain, the Australian campaign was focused mainly upon containment. After landing at Jacquinot Bay the battalion was based around the Tol Plantation and conducted patrolling operations to restrict the Japanese to the Gazelle Peninsula. Little contact was made and actual combat was limited; the battalion's casualties amounted to three dead and four wounded. Following the end of the war, the 11th Battalion occupied Rabaul, before being disbanded on 11 April 1946.

== Post World War II ==
In 1948, Australia's part-time military force was re-raised in the guise of the Citizens Military Force. At this time, the 11th/44th Battalion (City of Perth Regiment) was formed. From 1960, following a reorganisation of the Army that saw the adoption of the Pentropic divisional establishment, the 11th/44th was reduced to a company-sized element and 'A' (City of Perth) Company, 1st Battalion, Royal Western Australia Regiment maintained the traditions of the 11th Battalion. The following year, the 11th Battalion was awarded the 15 battle honours that had been earned by the 11th and 2/11th Battalions during World War II. A separate 11th Battalion, Royal Western Australia Regiment was reformed in 1966, being formed through a designation of the 2nd Battalion, Royal Western Australia Regiment. Ten years later, the battalion was reduced to an independent company and in 1987, the 11th Independent Rifle Company was amalgamated with the 28th Independent Rifle Company to form the current 11th/28th Battalion, Royal Western Australia Regiment.

== Alliances ==
The 11th Battalion held the following alliance:

- United Kingdom – Royal Sussex Regiment (approved in 1925).

== Battle honours ==
The 11th Battalion received the following battle honours:

- Boer War
  - South Africa, 1899–1902 (inherited).
- World War I
  - Somme 1916–18, Pozières, Bullecourt, Ypres 1917, Menin Road, Polygon Wood, Broodseinde, Poelcappelle, Passchendaele, Lys, Hazebrouck, Amiens, Albert 1918, Hindenburg Line, Epehy, France and Flanders 1916–1918, ANZAC, Landing at ANZAC, Defence of ANZAC, Suvla, Sari Bair, Gallipoli 1915, Egypt 1915–16.
- World War II
  - North Africa 1940–41, Bardia 1941, Capture of Tobruk, Derna, Greece 1941, Brallos Pass, Crete, Retimo, South-West Pacific 1944–45, Liberation of Australian New Guinea, Matapau, Abau–Malin, Wewak, Wirui Mission.
