= Battle of Sablat =

1619 battle during the Bohemian period of the Thirty Years' War

Coordinates: 49°7′54″N 14°16′34″E

- Part of the Bohemian revolt of the Thirty Years' War
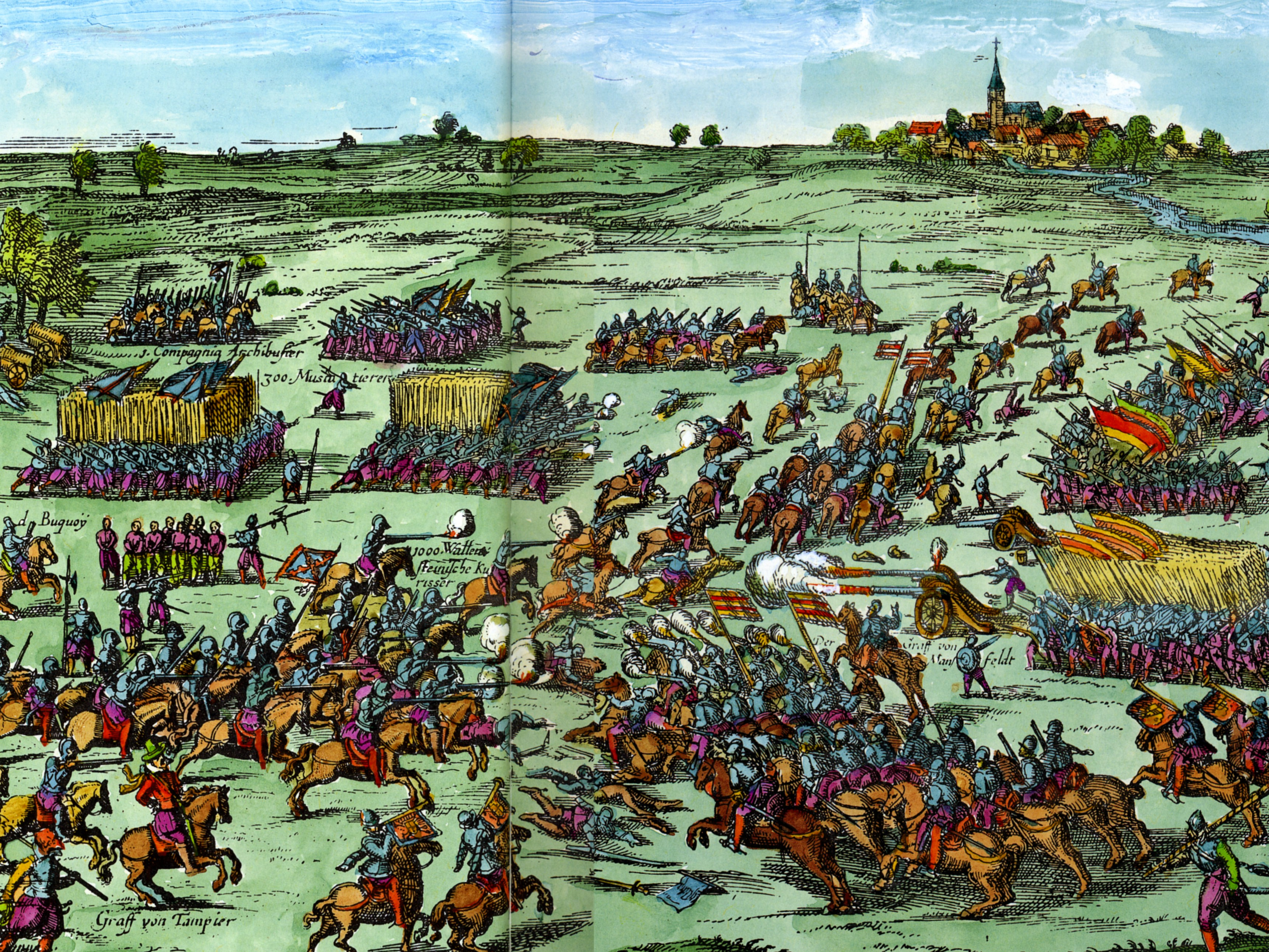
- The Battle of Sablat
Date	10 June 1619
Location	Záblatí, Bohemia (present-day Czech Republic)
Result	Imperial victory

Belligerents
(Holy Roman Empire) Habsburg Austria (Kingdom of Bohemia) Royalists	Kingdom of Bohemia; Duchy of Savoy

Commanders and leaders
(Holy Roman Empire) Charles Longueval (Holy Roman Empire) Graf Tampier	(Kingdom of Bohemia) (Duchy of Savoy) Ernst Mansfeld

Strength
5,000	3,200

Casualties and losses
650 killed or wounded	1,500 killed or wounded

The Battle of Sablat or Záblatí occurred on 10 June 1619, during the Bohemian period of the Thirty Years' War. The battle was fought between a Roman Catholic Imperial army led by Charles Bonaventure de Longueval, Count of Bucquoy and the 20,000 strong Protestant army of Ernst von Mansfeld's mercenaries.

When Mansfeld was on his way to reinforce general Hohenlohe, who was besieging České Budějovice, Bucquoy intercepted Mansfeld near the small village of Záblatí (German: Sablat), about 25 km (16 mi) km northwest of České Budějovice, and brought him to battle. Mansfeld suffered defeat, losing at least 1,500 infantry and his baggage train. As a result, the Bohemians had to lift the siege of České Budějovice.

== Sources ==
- Parker, Geoffrey. The Thirty Years' War, (London/New York: Routledge, 1984. ISBN 0-415-02534-6). 340 pages.
