= Maximilien de Longueval, 1st Count of Bucquoy =

16th-century Low Countries nobleman and military commander

Maximilien de Longueval 1st Count of Bucquoy
- Born: 16 April 1537; Arras, County of Artois, Habsburg Netherlands
- Died: 29 November 1581 (aged 44); Tournai
- Children: Charles Bonaventure de Longueval, 2nd Count of Bucquoy
- Military career
- Allegiance: Spain; Holy Roman Empire
- Conflicts: Eighty Years' War

Maximilien de Longueval, 1st Count of Bucquoy (16 April 1537 – 29 November 1581), 5th Baron of Vaulx, was a Royal Spanish general.

== Early life ==
Longueval was born on 16 April 1537 at Arras, County of Artois, Habsburg Netherlands. He was the son of Jean Adrien de Longueval, Baron of Vaulx (1510–1551), and Jeanne de Rosimbos de Villers (1505–1570). His father was Chief Steward of the Emperor Charles V and a Knight of the Order of the Golden Fleece.

His paternal grandfather was Adrien de Longueval, Lord of Vaulx, was Chamberlain to Archduke Philip the Handsome, King of Castile, León and Granada. The family initially named itself after its ancestral seat, Longueval near Amiens. In 1444, the barony of Vaulx was acquired, and in 1567, the Lordship of Bucquoy, both located in the County of Artois near Bapaume. His maternal grandparents were Pierre, Lord of Rosimbos, and Marie de Habarcq (a daughter of Chevalier Philippe de Habarcq).

== Career ==
Longueval was a Royal Spanish General during the Eighty Years' War. In 1580, he was made Count of Buquoy by Charles V's son (by Isabella of Portugal), Philip II of Spain, and fell at the Siege of Tournai in 1581, when the Spanish Habsburg troops of Alexander Farnese, Duke of Parma took the city from Netherlandish rebels. The States General of the northern provinces, united in the 1579 Union of Utrecht, passed an Act of Abjuration in 1581 declaring that they no longer recognized Philip as their king. The Southern Netherlands (what is now Belgium and Luxembourg) remained under Spanish rule.

== Personal life ==
On 11 December 1567, Longueval was married to Marguerite de Lille de Fresnes (d. 1612), a daughter of Count Adrien de Lille, Lord of Fresnes, and Hélène of Burgundy (a granddaughter of Baudouin of Burgundy, Lord of Fallais, who was an illegitimate child of Philip the Good, Duke of Burgundy). Together they were the parents of:

- Jeanne de Longueval (b. 1568), who married Count Charles-Guillaume de Fiennes Chaumont Bassigny.
- Yolande de Longueval (1569–1648), who married Hermann of Burgundy, Count of Fallais, Governor of Limburg, in c. 1596.
- Charles Bonaventure de Longueval, 2nd Count of Bucquoy (1571–1621), who married Maria Maddalena Biglia, daughter of Baldassare Biglia, Count of Saronno, a Milanese nobleman in the entourage of the Archduke Albert, in 1606.
- Philippe de Longueval
- Magdalena de Longueval (d. 1603)

The Count died at Tournai on 29 November 1581. His widow died on 8 August 1612. For his son's efforts in the Thirty Years' War, the family was given the German dominions of Gratzen, Rosenberg and Sonnenberg as well as the partly German, partly Czech dominion of Libiegitz and Zuckenstein Castle by Ferdinand II in 1620 from the confiscated property of the Schwanbergers. From 1620 to 1945 the Buquoys lived mainly in southern Bohemia.

=== Descendants ===
Through his son Charles, he was posthumously a grandfather of Charles Albert de Longueval, 3rd Count of Bucquoy (1607–1663), who married Maria Wilhelmine de Croÿ Solre (a daughter of Jean, Count of Croÿ Solre and Marie Jeanne de Lalaing), in 1634 and had thirteen children.

== Bibliography ==
- Rahl, Charles. Les Belges en Bohême (Brussels, Leipzig and Ghent, 1850).
