= Charles Bonaventure de Longueval, 2nd Count of Bucquoy =

17th-century Low Countries nobleman and military commander

Charles I Bonaventure de Longueval 2nd Count of Bucquoy
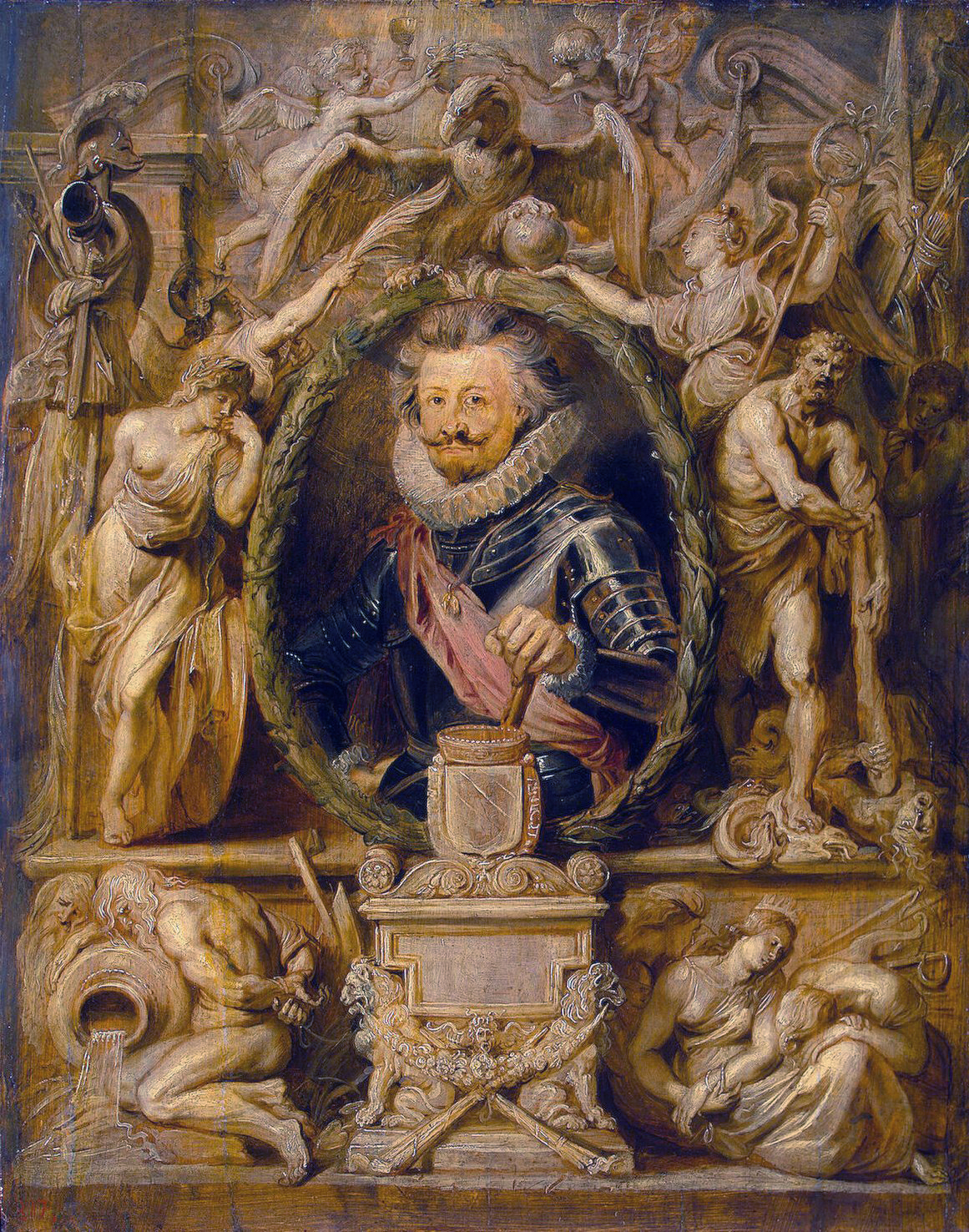
- Portrait by Peter Paul Rubens
- Born: 9 January 1571; Arras, County of Artois, Habsburg Netherlands
- Died: 10 July 1621 (aged 50); Nové Zámky, Lower Hungary, Kingdom of Hungary
- Spouse: Maria Maddalena Biglia
- Relatives: Charles Albert (son)
- Military career
- Allegiance: Spain; Holy Roman Empire
- Rank: Colonel (1597); General (1614)
- Commands: General of the Artillery of the Army of Flanders; Commander-in-chief of the Imperial army
- Conflicts: French Wars of Religion; Siege of Calais (1596); Eighty Years' War; Battle of Nieuwpoort; Siege of Ostend; Siege of Lingen (1605); Siege of Groenlo (1606); Thirty Years' War; Battle of Lomnice; Battle of Sablat; Battle of White Mountain
- Awards: Order of the Golden Fleece (1613)

Charles Bonaventure de Longueval, 2nd Count of Bucquoy (Czech: Karel Bonaventura Buquoy, Spanish: Carlos Buenaventura de Longueval, Conde de Bucquoy, full name in French: Charles Bonaventure de Longueval comte de Bucquoy, German: Karl Bonaventura Graf von Buquoy) (9 January 1571, Arras – 10 July 1621, Nové Zámky) was a military commander who fought for the Spanish Netherlands during the Eighty Years' War and for the Holy Roman Empire during the Thirty Years' War.

== Career in the Spanish Army of Flanders ==
Bucquoy was born in Arras on 9 January 1571, son of Maximilien de Longueval, 1st Count of Bucquoy. He began serving in Spanish forces in the Low Countries as a teenager, and was a colonel at the age of 26. He fought in the Battle of Nieuwpoort (1600), the Siege of Ostend (1601–1604) and distinguished himself as General of the Artillery in the Frisian campaigns of Ambrosio Spinola. In 1606 he married Maria Maddalena Biglia, daughter of a Milanese nobleman in the entourage of the Archduke Albert and in 1607 they had a son named Charles Albert.

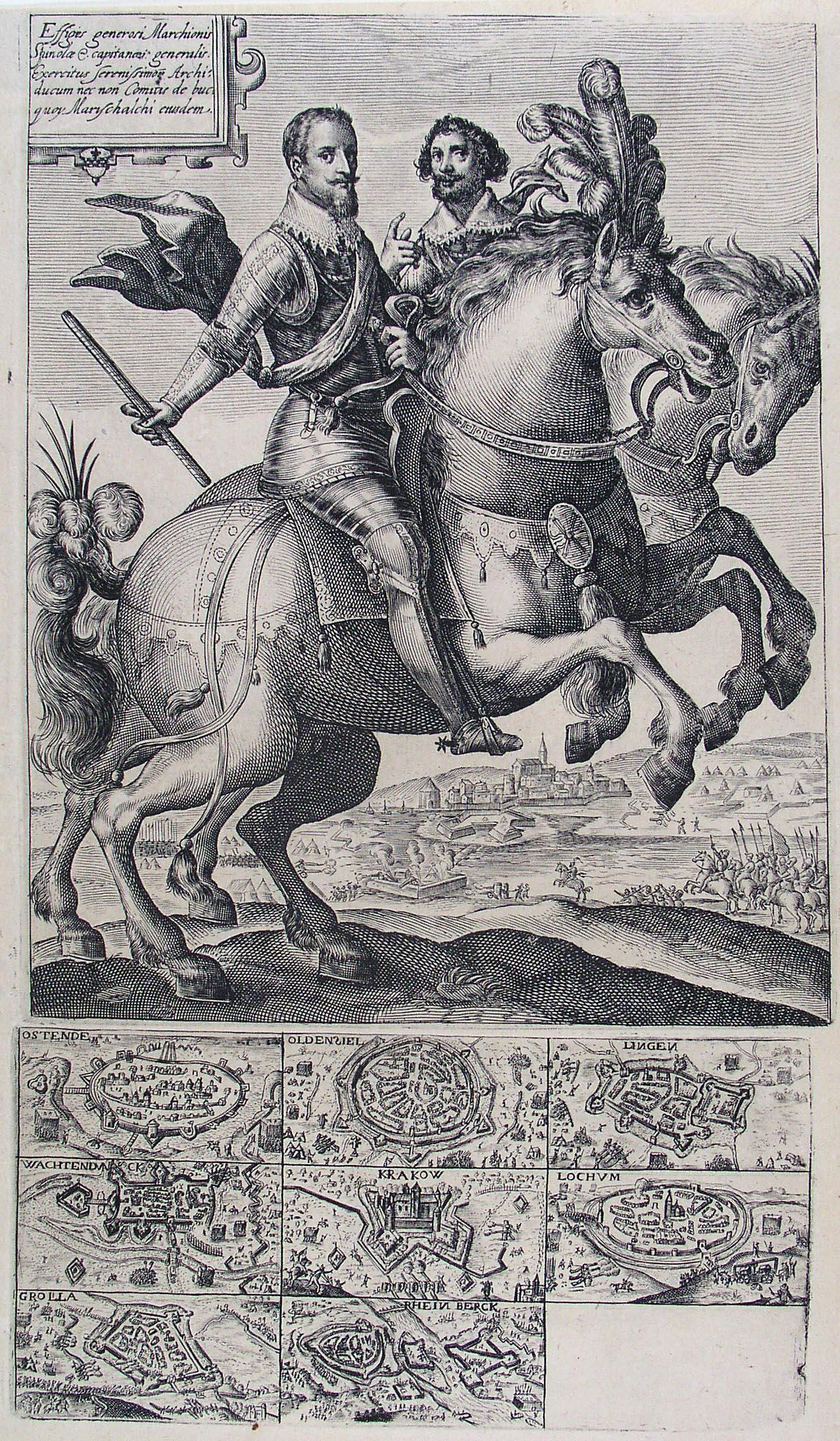
Engraving by Chrispijn van der Passe showing the conquests and the equestrian portrait of Ambrogio Spinola, with the Count of Bucquoy riding by his side

In 1610 he was ambassador extraordinary to France, to convey the condolences of Archdukes Albert and Isabella on the murder of Henry IV of France.

In 1613 he became a knight of the Order of the Golden Fleece. As a mark of special favour the commandery in the Order of Calatrava that he had to renounce upon entering the Golden Fleece, was transferred to his son. That year also saw his appointment as Grand Bailiff (or governor) of the County of Hainaut.

== Commander of the Imperial Army ==
He travelled to Bohemia to represent Archduke Albert at the Diet of Budweis in January 1614. Shortly after his election, Emperor Matthias invited Bucquoy to take charge of the Imperial Army and he accepted the post in August 1614. He happened to be on leave in the Habsburg Netherlands when on 23 May 1618 the Second Defenestration of Prague triggered the Bohemian Revolt. Bucquoy returned to Vienna in August and took command of the imperial forces raised to put down the revolt. Short of soldiers, supplies and money, his first campaign came close to disaster more than once. Defeated by Count Jindřich Matyáš Thurn on 9 November in the Battle of Lomnice, he was unable to save the besieged town of Pilsen. While his army encamped in its winter quarters around Budweis, Thurn's surprise march on Vienna was only halted by the severity of winter. After receiving reinforcements provided by Archduke Albert, Bucquoy's campaign of 1619 did much to reverse the fortunes of the war. On 10 June he defeated Ernst von Mansfeld in the Battle of Sablat, thereby forcing the Bohemians to abandon their siege of Budweis.

He also commanded the imperial forces during the Battle of White Mountain on 8 November 1620. As a result of his successes, Emperor Ferdinand II gave him estates at Nové Hrady, Rožmberk and Libějovice. These estates remained in the family until 1945.

Bucquoy was killed during the siege of Neuhäusel Fortress (Hungary: Érsekújvár, Latin: Novum Castrum, today Nové Zámky, Slovakia) on 10 July 1621. One of his commanders, Torquato Conti, attempted to retrieve his body from the battlefield but was captured. Conti was later released and replaced Bucquoy as a commander of Imperial forces.

His funeral, with full honours, took place in the Franciscan Church, Vienna, on 31 July 1621.

== Bibliography ==
- Rahl, Charles. Les Belges en Bohême (Brussels, Leipzig and Ghent, 1850).
