= Battle of Lomnice =

1618 battle of the Thirty Years' War

Coordinates: 49°2′43″N 14°41′7″E

- Part of the Thirty Years' War
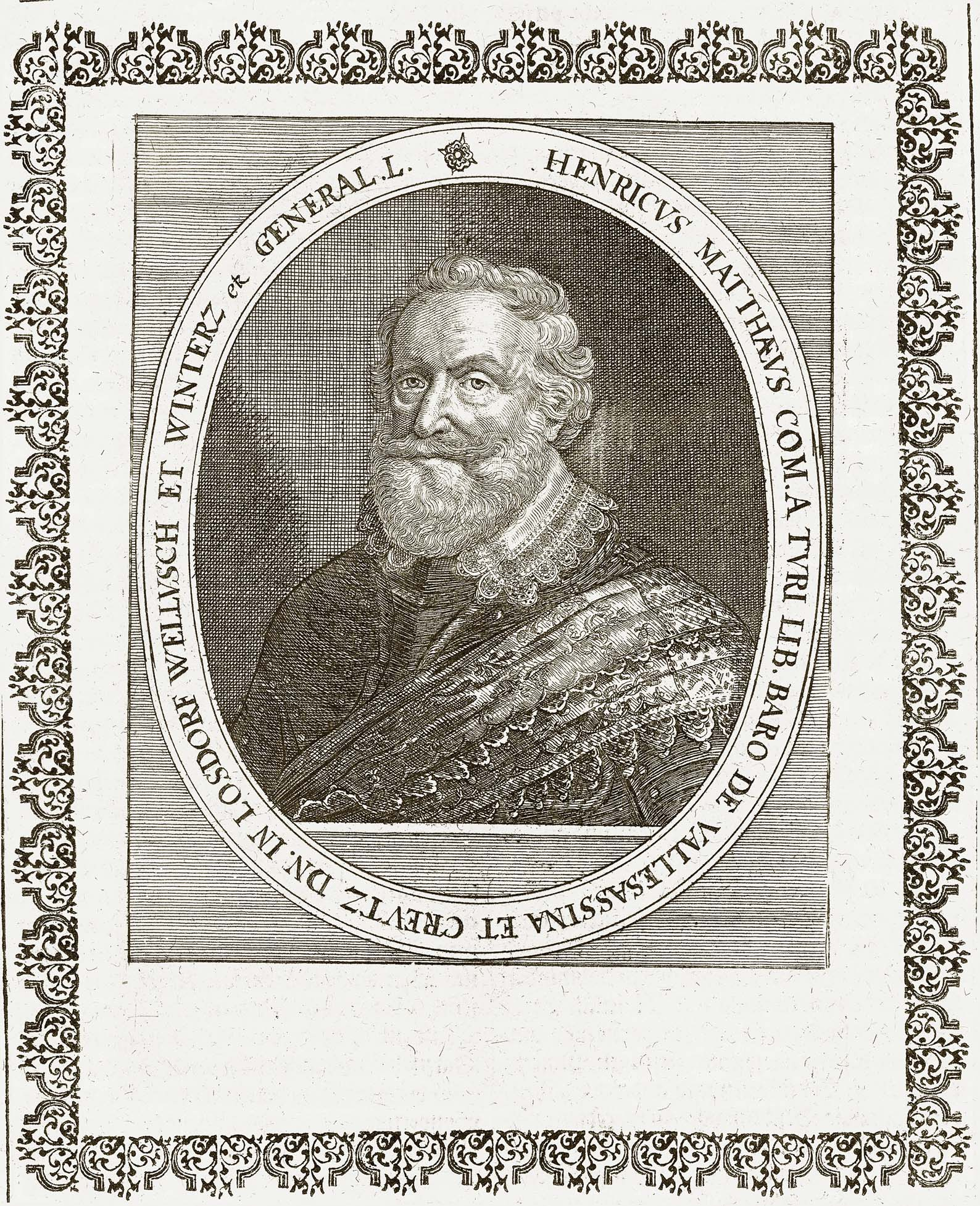
- Jindřich Matyáš Thurn
Date	9 November 1618
Location	Lomnice nad Lužnicí, Bohemia
Result	Bohemian victory

Belligerents
(Kingdom of Bohemia) Bohemia	(Holy Roman Empire) Habsburg Monarchy (Kingdom of Bohemia) Bohemian Royalists

Commanders and leaders
(Kingdom of Bohemia) Jindřich Thurn	(Holy Roman Empire) Charles Longueval

Strength
~14,000	>10,000

Casualties and losses
80 killed 120 wounded	~1,500 casualties

The Battle of Lomnice or Lomnice nad Lužnicí occurred on 9 November 1618, during the Bohemian period of the Thirty Years' War. It was fought between the Habsburg Roman Catholic army of Charles Bonaventure de Longueval, Count of Bucquoy, and the Protestant army of Jindřich Matyáš Thurn.

On 23 May 1618, the Bohemian Protestant nobles defied their King Ferdinand, heir to Holy Roman Emperor Matthias, and threw the Roman Catholic governors of Bohemia from a window of their office at Prague Castle in an act which came to be known as the Defenestration of Prague. The new government, formed of Protestant nobility and Jindřich Matyáš Thurn, assumed command over the Bohemian Protestant forces.

A Habsburg Roman Catholic army under the command of Charles Bonaventure de Longueval, Count of Bucquoy, was approaching Prague but a Protestant army stopped it near Čáslav for several weeks; subsequent problems with food supplies and illness forced Buqouy to withdraw. Later, when Bucquoy was on his way to reinforce, Count Thurn followed Bucquoy's army and forced a battle near the village of Lomnice nad Lužnicí in southern Bohemia. Part of the Roman Catholic army held a position between two ponds and suffered most of its casualties from artillery fire. Bucquoy suffered defeat, losing at least 1,500 troops. As a result, the main part of the Habsburg army had to leave Bohemia. But the Protestants did not follow up their victory by chasing the enemy, thereby missing an opportunity to crush their Catholic opponents.
