= Louverval =

Village in Doignies, Nord, France

Coordinates: 50°08′22″N 3°0′045″E

Louverval is a village in the Doignies commune in the Nord department in northern France.

In 1918 it was the site of a minor battle between the Australian 11th Battalion and the Germans during World War I in which Charles Pope won a posthumous Victoria Cross. It is the location of the Cambrai Memorial to the Missing (Louverval Military Cemetery).
