= Lords of Bucquoy =

Members of the feudal nobility of the Netherlands

Coat of arms of Longueval-Bucquoy family

The Lords of Bucquoy were members of the feudal nobility of the Netherlands. Now part of France, the dominium of Bucquoy was inherited by many important families. The House of Longueval moved to Bohemia in circa 1620.

== History ==
Bushoy, as it was called in old Dutch, was amongst the oldest lands in Artois. It was divided into two parts. Its territory was held by several major noble houses, including the House of Châtillon. Jeanne de Chatillon, daughter of Hughes and the last heiress of her line, married John I, Count of La Marche, who was lord of Bucqoy. In 1688, the dominium became a county at the request of Charles II.

== House of Chatillon ==
Hugues de Chatillon

  - Jean de Chatillon; m. John I, Count of La Marche
    - Louis, Count of Vendôme
      - John VIII, Count of Vendôme
        - Jacques of Bourbon, Governor of Valois
          - Charles de Bourbon, Lord of Bucqouy

== House of Sterck-Glimes ==
Gerald Sterck, Lord of Bucquoy; m. Jossina van den Daele, Lady of Stabroeck.

  - Anna Sterck, Lady of Bucoy;
    married to Ferry de Glimes, Baron of Grimberghen

== House of Glymes-Berghes ==
Ferry of Glimes, Baron of Grimberghen

  - Gerard de Berghes, Lord of Bucquoy and Stabroeck; m. Anne de Halmale

== House of Longueval ==
=== Barons of Vaulx ===
- Jean, Lord of Longueval (1378–1415); m. Jeanne d'Anvin de Hardentun
  - Jean de Longueval, Lord of Sainte-Croix (1420–1487); m. Marie de Bourbon
    - Jean de Longueval, Lord of Vaulx (1438–1499); m. Marie de Miraumont
      - Jean de Longueval, Lord of Vaulx (1487–1524); m. Anne de Courteville
        - Jean de Longueval, Baron of Vaulx (1510–1551); m. Jeanne de Rosimbos de Villers
          - Maximilien de Longueval, Baron of Vaulx (1537–1581); m. (1567) Marguerite de Lille de Fresnes

=== Counts of Bucquoy ===
Maximilien de Longueval, 1st Count of Bucquoy (1537–1581); m. (1567) Marguerite de Lille de Fresnes

  - Charles Bonaventure de Longueval, 2nd Count of Bucquoy (1571–1621); m. (1606) Maria Maddalena Biglia
    - Charles Albert de Longueval, 3rd Count of Bucquoy (1607–1663); m. (1634) Maria Wilhelmine de Croÿ Solre
