= Bucquoy =

- Commune
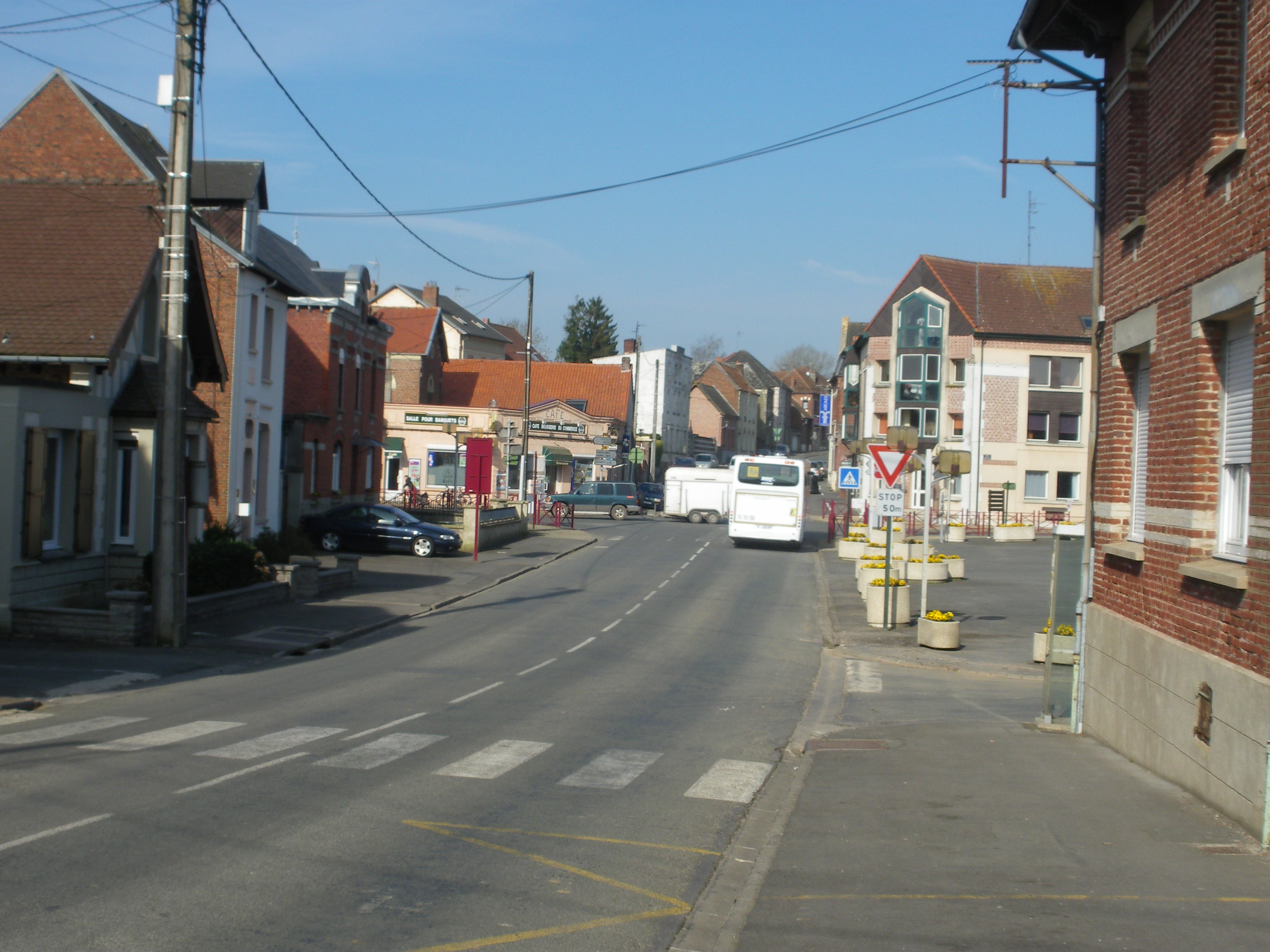
- The centre of Bucquoy

- Coat of arms
- Location of Bucquoy
- Location within France Location within Hauts-de-France
- Coordinates: 50°08′27″N 2°42′34″E
- Country: France
- Region: Hauts-de-France
- Department: Pas-de-Calais
- Arrondissement: Arras
- Canton: Bapaume
- Intercommunality: CC Sud-Artois

Government
  - Mayor (2025–2026): Eugène Delambre
- Area^{1}: 20.8 km^{2} (8.0 sq mi)
- Elevation: 124 m (407 ft)
- Highest elevation: 154 m (505 ft)
- Lowest elevation: 105 m (344 ft)
- Population (2023): 1,503
  - Density: 72.3/km^{2} (187/sq mi)
- Time zone: UTC+01:00 (CET)
  - Summer (DST): UTC+02:00 (CEST)
- INSEE/Postal code: 62181 /62116
- ^{1} French Land Register data, which excludes lakes, ponds, glaciers > 1 km^{2} (0.386 sq mi or 247 acres) and river estuaries.

Bucquoy (French pronunciation: [bykwˈa]) is a commune in the Pas-de-Calais department in the Hauts-de-France region in northern France.

The grounds, property of the Lords of Bucquoy, became a county in 1666 by request of Charles II.

== Geography ==
A farming village located 12 miles (19 km) south of Arras on the D919 road, at the junction with the D8.

== Population ==
Historical population
Year	Pop.	±% p.a.
1968	1,344	—
1975	1,307	−0.40%
1982	1,253	−0.60%
1990	1,243	−0.10%
1999	1,218	−0.23%
2007	1,416	+1.90%
2012	1,523	+1.47%
2017	1,461	−0.83%
2023	1,503	+0.47%
Source: INSEE

== Sights ==
- The church of St. Pierre, rebuilt, like most of the village, after destruction during World War I
- The ruins of a 13th-century château
- Queens Cemetery, for First World War allied casualties

== See also ==
- Communes of the Pas-de-Calais department
