= Libějovice =

- Municipality
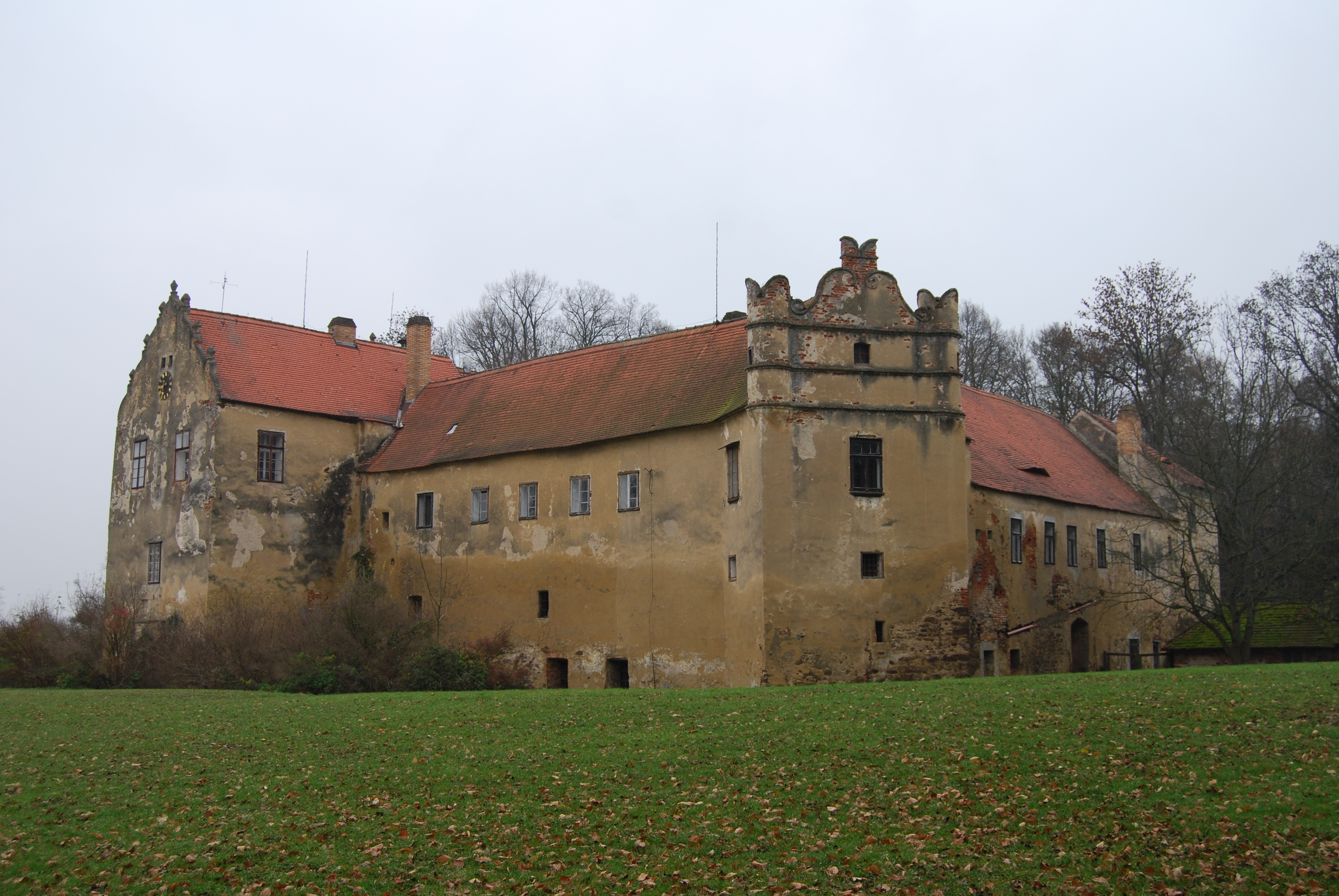
- Old Castle

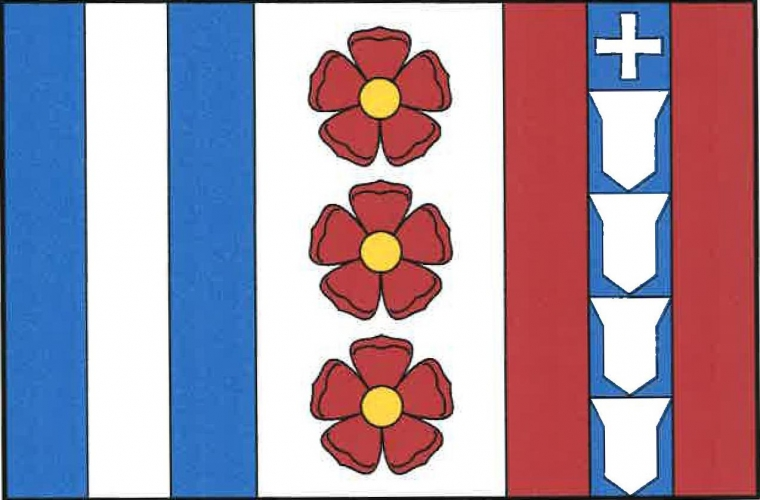
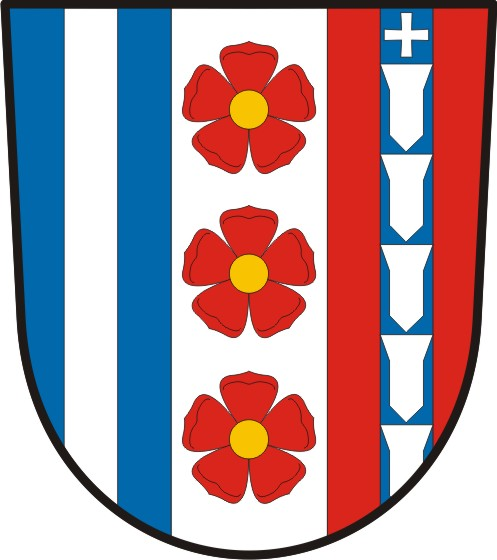
- Flag Coat of arms

- Location in the Czech Republic
- Coordinates: 49°6′52″N 14°11′36″E
- Country: Czech Republic
- Region: South Bohemian
- District: Strakonice
- First mentioned: 1264

Area
  - Total: 13.41 km^{2} (5.18 sq mi)
- Elevation: 434 m (1,424 ft)

Population (2026-01-01)
  - Total: 499
  - Density: 37.2/km^{2} (96.4/sq mi)
- Time zone: UTC+1 (CET)
  - Summer (DST): UTC+2 (CEST)
- Postal codes: 384 11, 387 72, 389 01
- Website: www.libejovice.cz

Libějovice is a municipality and village in Strakonice District in the South Bohemian Region of the Czech Republic. It has about 500 inhabitants.

== Administrative division ==
Libějovice consists of three municipal parts (in brackets population according to the 2021 census):

- Libějovice (243)
- Černěves (87)
- Nestanice (114)

== Etymology ==
The name is derived from the personal name Liběj, meaning "the village of Liběj's people".

== Geography ==
Libějovice is located about 26 kilometres (16 mi) southeast of Strakonice and 24 km (15 mi) northwest of České Budějovice. It lies mostly in the České Budějovice Basin. The highest point is the hill Lomec at 552 m (1,811 ft) above sea level. There are several fishponds in the municipal territory.

== History ==
The first written mention of Libějovice is from 1264.

== Demographics ==
Historical population

Year	Pop.	±%
1869	1,036	—
1880	1,027	−0.9%
1890	941	−8.4%
1900	924	−1.8%
1910	893	−3.4%

Year	Pop.	±%
1921	945	+5.8%
1930	923	−2.3%
1950	696	−24.6%
1961	704	+1.1%
1970	587	−16.6%

Year	Pop.	±%
1980	551	−6.1%
1991	487	−11.6%
2001	449	−7.8%
2011	449	+0.0%
2021	444	−1.1%

Source: Censuses

== Transport ==
The I/20 road (part of the European route E49) from České Budějovice to Plzeň and Karlovy Vary runs through the municipality.

== Sights ==
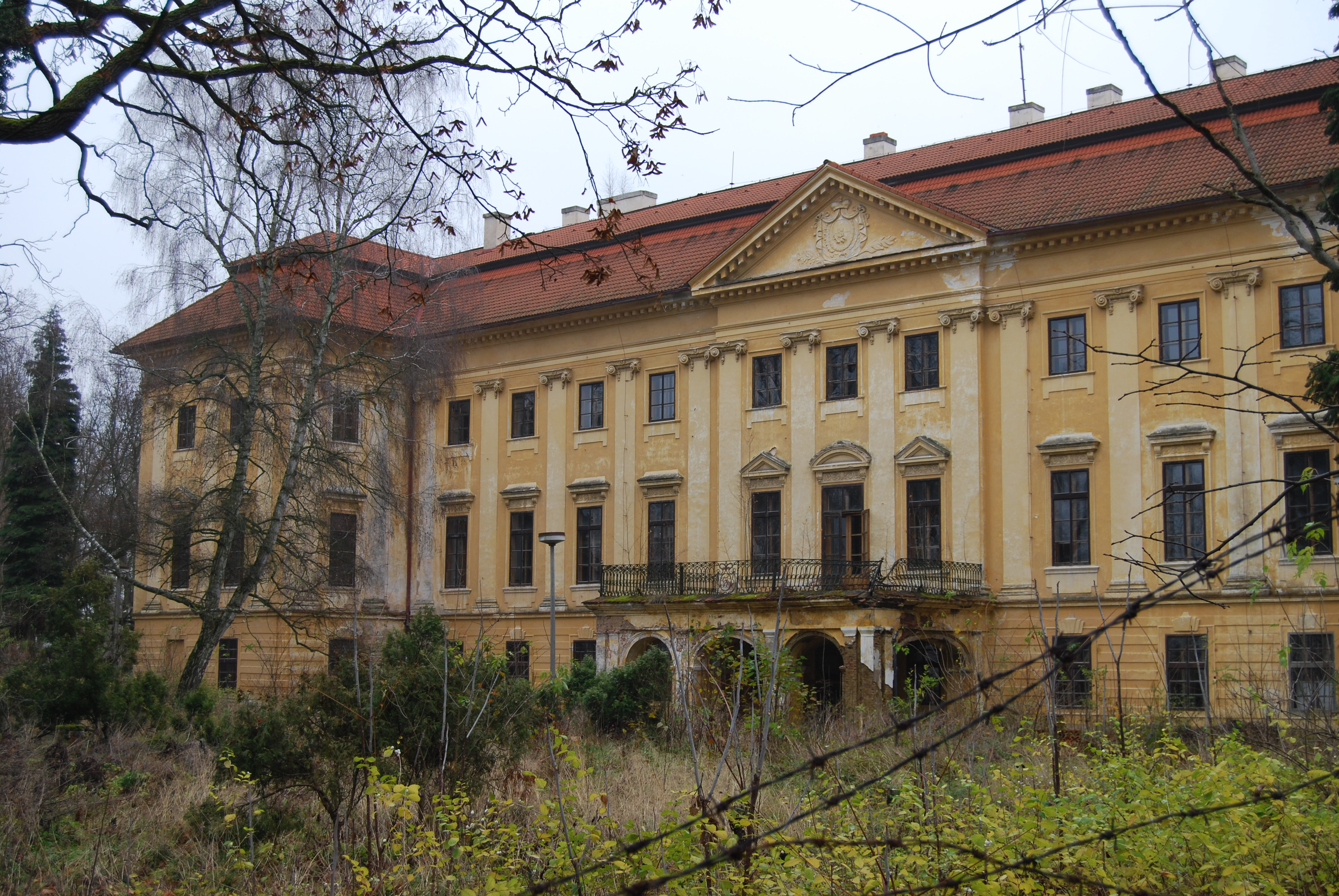
New Castle

There are two castles in Libějovice, called Old Castle and New Castle. The Old Castle was built in the Renaissance style by William of Rosenberg in the mid-16th century and reconstructed in 1715–1718 by the then-owner Karl Kajetan, Lord of Bucquoy. The New Castle was founded by the Lords of Buquoy in 1696 but it was not completed until 1754. The late Empire castle was rebuilt and extended in 1816–1817. Today both castles are privately owned and inaccessible.

The hill Lomec in the southern part of the municipality is one of the most important pilgrimage sites in the region. On the hill is the Lomec Monastery with the Church of the Name of the Virgin Mary. The monastery was originally a hunting manor house built in 1709–1710. Today it is home of the Congregation of the Gray Sisters of the Third Order of Saint Francis. The church belongs to important works of the Baroque in Central Europe. It was built in 1696–1702 for the miraculous statue of the Virgin Mary with Jesus and houses a unique altar, which is an imitation of Bernini's papal altar from the St. Peter's Basilica in Vatican.
