= Dříteň =

- Municipality
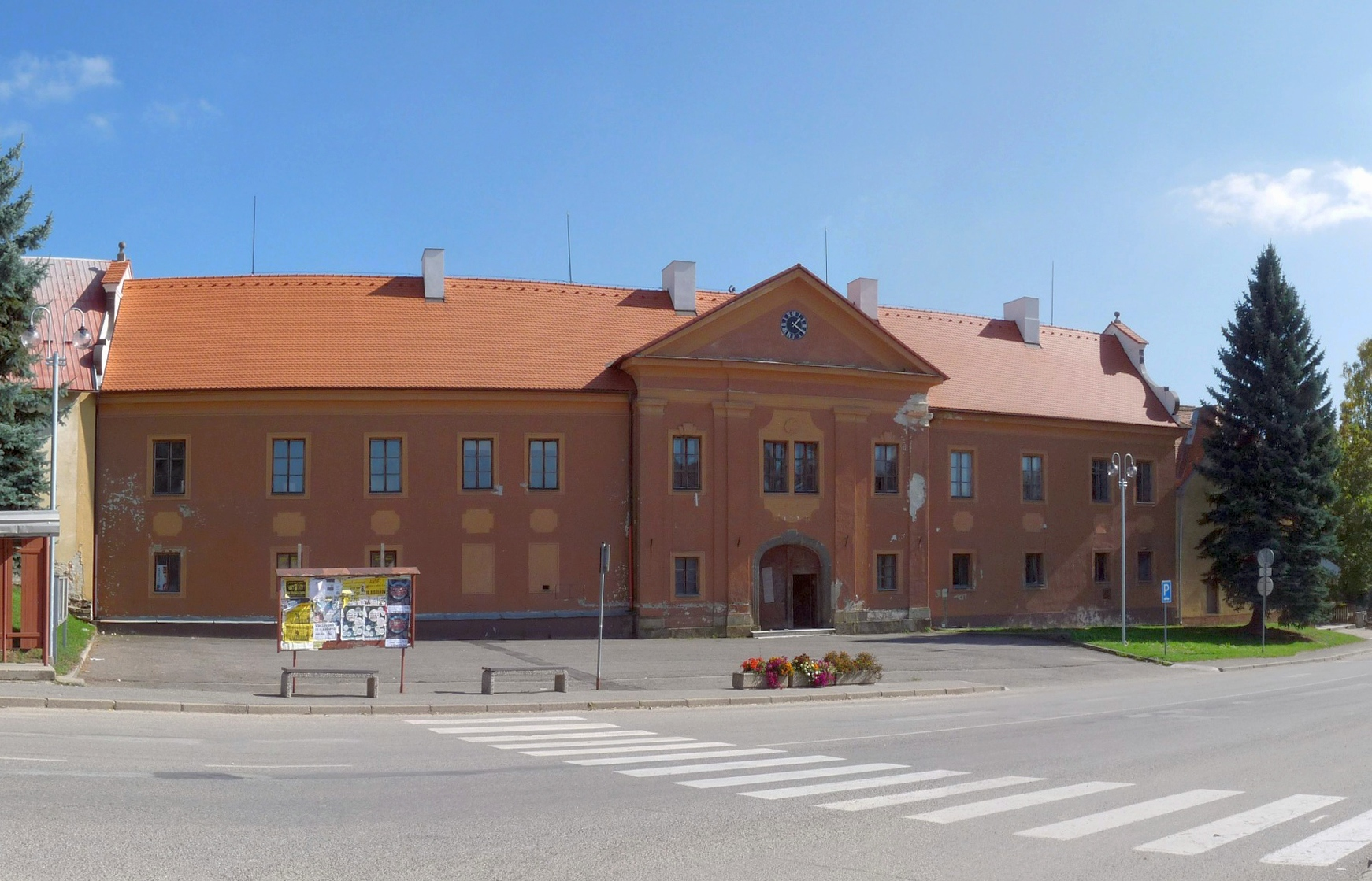
- Dříteň Castle before reconstruction

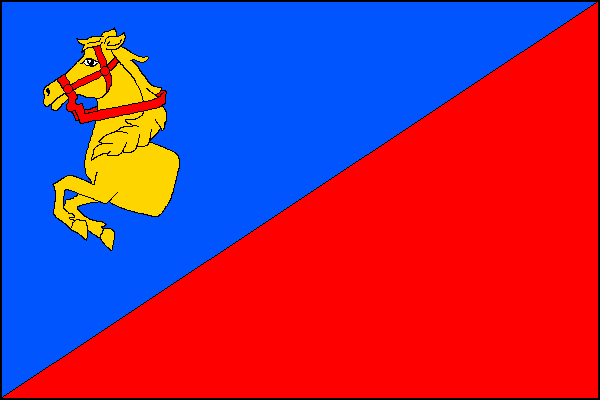
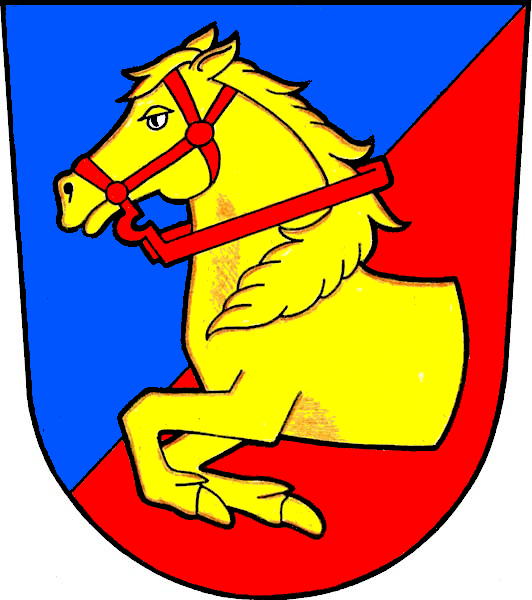
- Flag Coat of arms

- Location in the Czech Republic
- Coordinates: 49°8′34″N 14°20′46″E
- Country: Czech Republic
- Region: South Bohemian
- District: České Budějovice
- First mentioned: 1432

Area
  - Total: 46.08 km^{2} (17.79 sq mi)
- Elevation: 432 m (1,417 ft)

Population (2026-01-01)
  - Total: 1,734
  - Density: 37.63/km^{2} (97.46/sq mi)
- Time zone: UTC+1 (CET)
  - Summer (DST): UTC+2 (CEST)
- Postal codes: 373 48, 373 51, 375 01
- Website: www.obecdriten.cz

Dříteň (German: Zirnau) is a municipality and village in České Budějovice District in the South Bohemian Region of the Czech Republic. It has about 1,700 inhabitants.

== Administrative division ==
Dříteň consists of nine municipal parts (in brackets population according to the 2021 census):

- Dříteň (876)
- Chvalešovice (156)
- Libív (18)
- Malešice (130)
- Radomilice (67)
- Strachovice (69)
- Velice (145)
- Záblatí (104)
- Záblatíčko (68)

== Etymology ==
The name is derived from the personal name Dříten/Dřieten, meaning "Dříten's (court)".

== Geography ==
Dříteň is located about 20 kilometres (12 mi) northwest of České Budějovice. Most of the municipal territory lies in the České Budějovice Basin, but the eastern part extends into the Tábor Uplands and includes the highest point of Protivín, the hill Pakostov at 529 m (1,736 ft) above sea level. The territory of Dříteň is rich in fishponds and streams.

== History ==
The first written mention of Dříteň is from 1432.

== Demographics ==
Historical population

Year	Pop.	±%
1869	2,348	—
1880	2,451	+4.4%
1890	2,445	−0.2%
1900	2,436	−0.4%
1910	2,502	+2.7%

Year	Pop.	±%
1921	2,507	+0.2%
1930	2,328	−7.1%
1950	1,756	−24.6%
1961	1,661	−5.4%
1970	1,381	−16.9%

Year	Pop.	±%
1980	1,263	−8.5%
1991	1,167	−7.6%
2001	1,294	+10.9%
2011	1,522	+17.6%
2021	1,633	+7.3%

Source: Censuses

== Transport ==
The village of Záblatíčko is located on the railway line České Budějovice–Strakonice.

== Sights ==
The Dříteň Castle was built 1668–1674. It was created by the reconstruction of a burnt fortress from the 15th century. Since 2020, it has been used as the municipal office and post office.

The Church of Saint Dismas was built in 1691. In 1748–1760, it was rebuilt in the Baroque style.
