= German attack on Lagnicourt =

First World War battle

German attack on Lagnicourt (Unternehmen Sturmbock [Operation Battering Ram])
- Part of Flanking Operations to the Arras Offensive; Round Bullecourt (11 April – 16 June) Western Front of the First World War
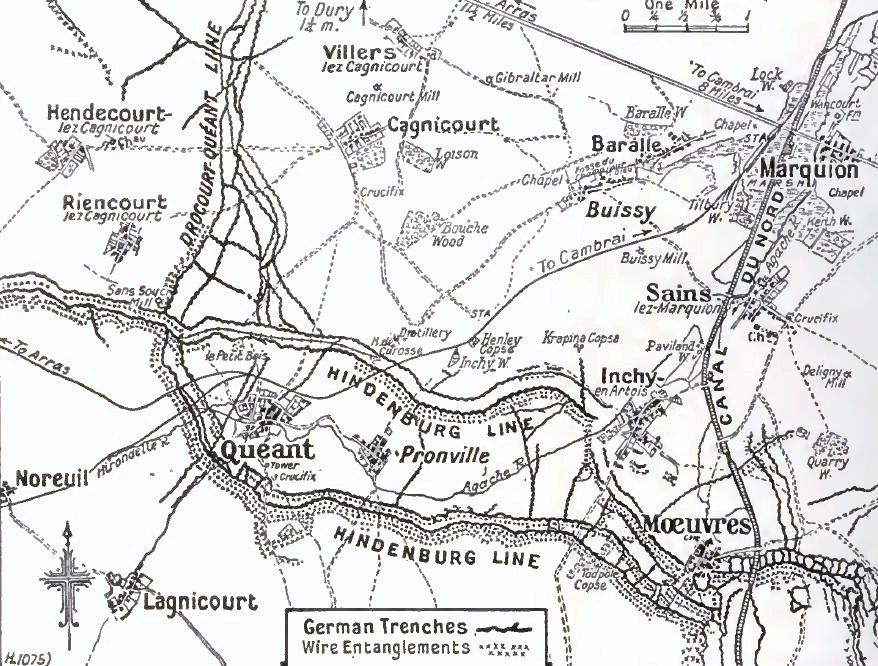
- Hindenburg and Drocourt-Queant Lines (1918)
Date	15 April 1917
Location	Lagnicourt, Nord-Pas-de-Calais, France 50°09′30″N 02°57′24″E
Result	Indecisive

Belligerents
Germany	British Empire

Commanders and leaders
Paul von Hindenburg; Crown Prince Rupprecht	Douglas Haig; Hubert Gough

Strength
4 divisions (16,000 infantry)	3 divisions (4,000 infantry)

Casualties and losses
2,313	1,010
- Lagnicourt, a commune in the Pas-de-Calais department

The German attack on Lagnicourt (German: Unternehmen Sturmbock [Operation Battering Ram]) on 15 April 1917 was a military operation on the Western Front during the First World War. Four German divisions conducted a spoiling attack on the positions of the 1st Anzac Corps of the British Fifth Army. The attack was intended to delay the advance of the Fifth Army towards the Hindenburg Line, inflict casualties and destroy as much equipment, particularly artillery, as possible.

Sturmbock was also to deprive the British of the means to attack Gruppe Arras (IX Reserve Corps) as it fought the Battle of Arras (9 April to 16 May 1917) and Gruppe Quéant (XIV Reserve Corps) to the south. The German commanders hoped to gain time to prepare more defences and to show that the retirement to the Hindenburg Line had not diminished German morale or the ability to attack. The Fifth Army was recovering from the First attack on Bullecourt (11 April) and preparing for the Battle of Bullecourt (3–17 May 1917), a much bigger effort.

The attack by two divisions of Gruppe Quéant and two divisions of Gruppe Cambrai to its south, fell on the positions of the 1st Australian Division and the 2nd Australian Division. The Australians repulsed the attacks, except at Lagnicourt, where German troops broke in, took prisoners, destroyed six artillery pieces and captured confidential documents. Australian counter-attacks cut off some of the attackers and inflicted 2,313 casualties against 1,010 Australian.

The Fifth Army hurried forward more artillery and consolidated its defences, adding more advanced posts. Preparations for the next attack at Bullecourt continued and the Germans reinforced the Hindenburg Line (Siegfriedstellung) defences in the area. The attack was criticised by German commanders, especially for its rushed preparations, sparse results and severe casualties. The British moved no reserves from the 1st Anzac Corps area and continued the offensive at Arras.

== Background ==
=== Hindenburg Line ===
The Hindenberg Line at Bullecourt (photographed 1920)

General Erich von Falkenhayn, the head of Oberste Heeresleitung (Chief of the General Staff) was dismissed on 29 August 1916 and replaced by Field Marshal Paul von Hindenburg and General Erich Ludendorff. The new regime, known as the third OHL, ended the offensive at Verdun on the Western Front and requested proposals for a new shorter defensive position in France. Generalfeldmarschall Crown Prince Rupprecht, commander of Army Group Rupprecht of Bavaria (Heeresgruppe Kronprinz Rupprecht), was ordered to prepare a rear defensive line and work on the new Hindenburg Line (Siegfriedstellung [Siegfried Position]) defences began.

Hindenburg ordered that the Somme front be given priority in the west for troops and supplies. By the end of September, Rupprecht had no reserves left on the Somme and another thirteen fresh divisions were sent to oppose the British, troops being scraped up wherever they could be found. For the Abwehrschlacht (defensive battle) expected in 1917, the Hindenburg Line was to be built across the base of the Noyon Salient, from Neuville Vitasse near Arras, through St Quentin and Laon to the Chemin des Dames ridge. The new fortified areas (Eventualstellungen, similar to ones built on the Russian front) were intended to be a precaution (Sicherheitskoeffizient) which could shorten the Western Front, economise on troops and create reserves against the offensives expected in 1917. The Siegfriedstellung had the potential to release the greatest number of troops and was begun first.

=== Operation Alberich ===
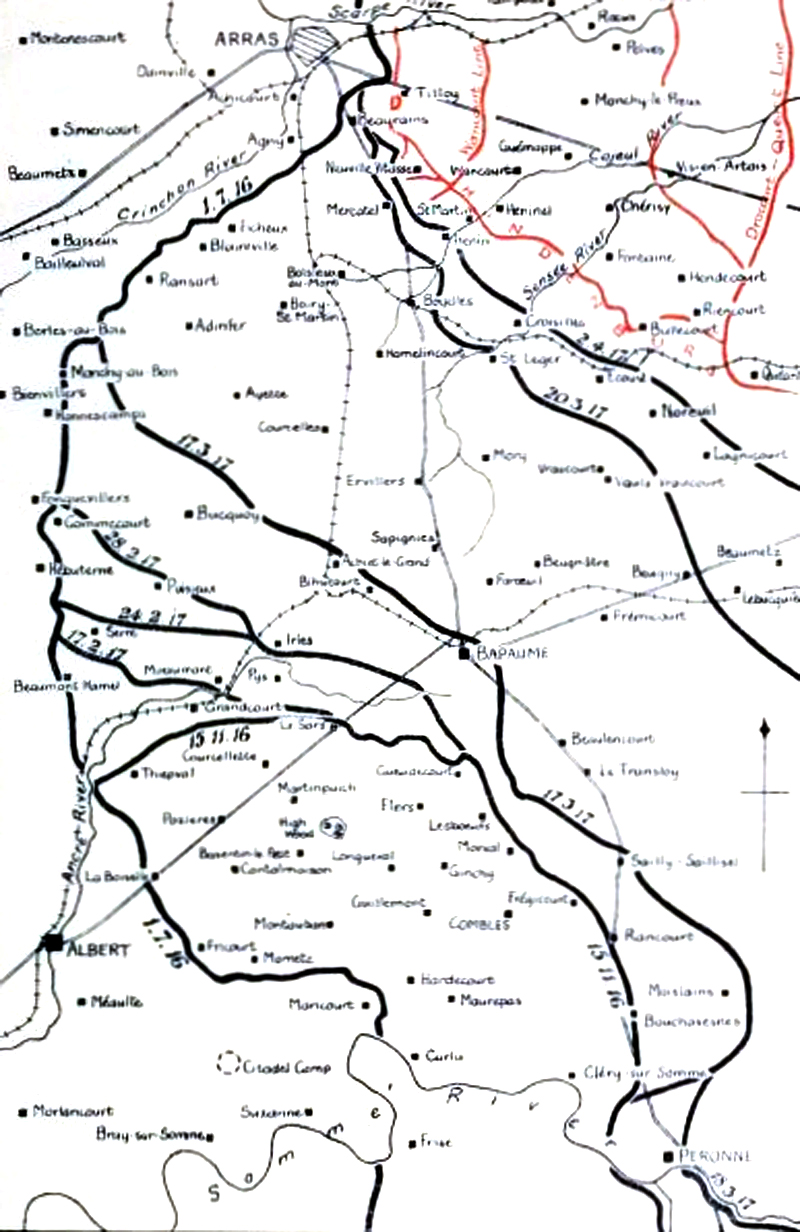
German retirements from the Somme, 1917

Ludendorff ordered 9 February to be the first day of the Alberich Bewegung (Alberich Manoeuvre) and 16 March the first marching day. On 17 March, the 1st Army, at the north end of the Bapaume Salient, withdrew swiftly. Riegel I Stellung was abandoned by 18 March and next day Boyelles and Boiry-Becquerelle were evacuated. The withdrawal went straight back to the Siegfriedstellung (Hindenburg Line) except for outposts and raids mounted on British outposts during 20 and 21 March. Bapaume was abandoned, with many houses still on fire. Next day, parties of Germans at Beugny in the Riegel III Stellung fought until nightfall then slipped away. A party at Vaulx-Vraucourt was surprised and driven back to Lagnicourt, which was captured on 26 March. A German counter-attack from Noreuil and a British attack on Bucquoy were repulsed.

On 17 March, withdrawals by the 2nd Army began north of the Avre and by 18 March, the other German armies and the southern wing of the 6th Army began to withdraw from 110 mi (180 km) of the old front line (65 mi (105 km) as the crow flies). The Somme River and canal crossings from Offoy to Péronne were destroyed and pools of water 0.5 mi (0.80 km) wide, near road embankments, made crossings anywhere else impossible, the damage being made worse by the spring thaw. On 18 March the main body of German troops reached the Hindenburg Line (Siegfriedstellung) where work was still being done to remedy defects in the original position. Outpost villages close to the Siegfriedstellung south of Quéant had to be held for longer than expected to complete the extra work. Heudicourt, Sorel and Fins were lost on 30 March. The northern outpost villages were captured on 2 April and Lempire fell three days later.

=== XIV Reserve Corps ===
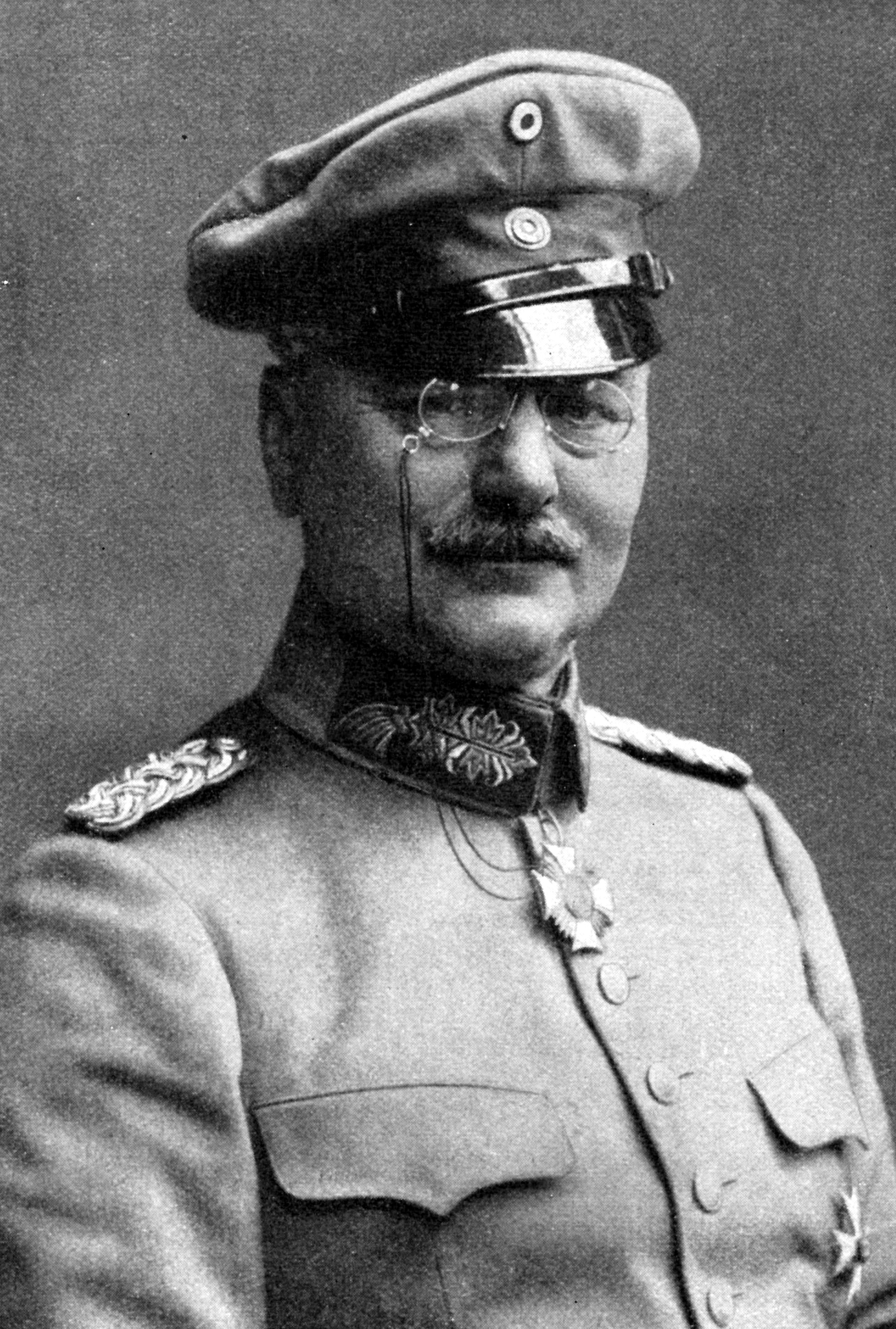
Generalleutnant Otto von Moser

During the Battle of the Somme in 1916, divisions had quickly become exhausted and it had proved impractical to replace corps headquarters and their constituent divisions at the rate necessary to rest tired divisions; corps HQ remained on the Somme and took over fresh divisions as they arrived. By 1917 the connexion between Corps HQ and their component divisions had been dissolved on the rest of the Western Front and territorial titles introduced. After the retreat to the Siegfriedstellung, the IX Reserve Corps, responsible for the line from the Scarpe to Croisilles, became Gruppe Arras and the XIV Reserve Corps Gruppe Quéant (Generalleutnant [Lieutenant-General] Otto von Moser from 12 March 1917) held the Siegfriedstellung from Croisilles to Mœuvres. The 6th Army HQ had decided that the 11,000 yd (6.3 mi; 10 km) front held by the Gruppe was too vulnerable to be held by two divisions. On 13 April, the 6th Army chief of staff notified Moser that the 3rd Guard Division was being transferred to the Gruppe after having had three months of rest and training.

== Prelude ==
=== Fifth Army ===
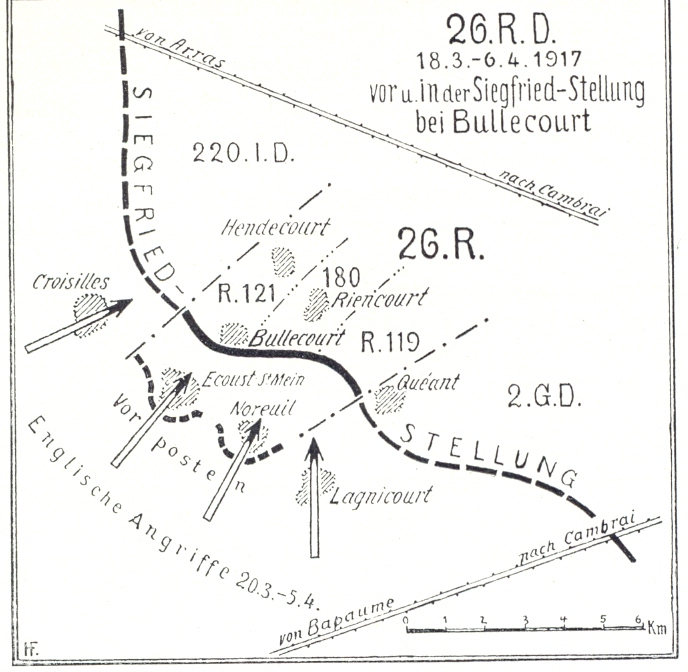
Retirement of the 26th Reserve Division, March 1917

The original British plan for the Fifth Army to co-operate with the Third Army attack into the salient formed around Bapaume, during the Battle of the Somme in 1916, was made redundant. The German withdrawal to the Hindenburg Line (Siegfriedstellung) forestalled the British attack and the Fifth Army was ordered to push back German rearguards and prepare to attack the Hindenburg Line between Quéant and Bullecourt, to support the Third Army offensive, a much more difficult task. The Fifth Army had been stripped of divisions and artillery and bringing up the remaining guns and ammunition over the supply desert created by German demolitions was slow. The Hindenburg Line was far more formidable than the decrepit defences abandoned during the withdrawal but if the Fifth Army could penetrate the Hindenburg Line, the task of the Third Army, advancing south-eastwards down the Arras–Cambrai road would be eased.

Bullecourt was 3.5 mi (5.6 km) from the road at Vis-en-Artois and under 2 mi (3.2 km) at Fontaine-lès-Croisilles, the first objective of the Cavalry Corps, advancing in front of the Third Army. Gough suggested that the Fifth Army could support the main offensive but for lack of means could only attack on a narrow front. Bullecourt was substituted for Quéant which was behind four defensive positions. The attack would then pivot to the right flank to capture the junction of the Hindenburg Line and the Drocourt–Quéant Switch Line (Wotanstellung). If successful, the 4th Cavalry Division would pass through to meet the Cavalry Corps from Arras. Fifth Army attacks on 2 April captured the German outpost villages from Doignies to Croisilles and Gough ordered that risks be taken to advance as much heavy artillery as possible.

On 5 April Gough issued orders to the V Corps and 1st Anzac Corps for an attack on a 3,500 yd (2.0 mi; 3.2 km) front with Bullecourt in the centre. Riencourt was the second objective and Hendecourt the third objective, where the 4th Cavalry Division was to advance and rendezvous with the Cavalry Corps. The Fifth Army received D Company, Tank Corps, five tanks for each corps and two in army reserve. The heavy guns were delayed by German road demolitions and the field artillery had to be moved in relays due to a shortage of horses. The 4th Australian Division was not able to use all its seven artillery brigades until 8 April, even after hauling field guns with crews and ammunition by lorry. On the right of V Corps to the north, the 62nd (2nd West Riding) Division took over from the 7th Division on 5 April; both divisional artilleries moved forward in stages and began wire cutting on 7 April. Australian patrols found no gaps in the wire, about 30 yd (27 m) deep, east of Bullecourt.

=== First attack on Bullecourt ===
==== 8–10 April ====
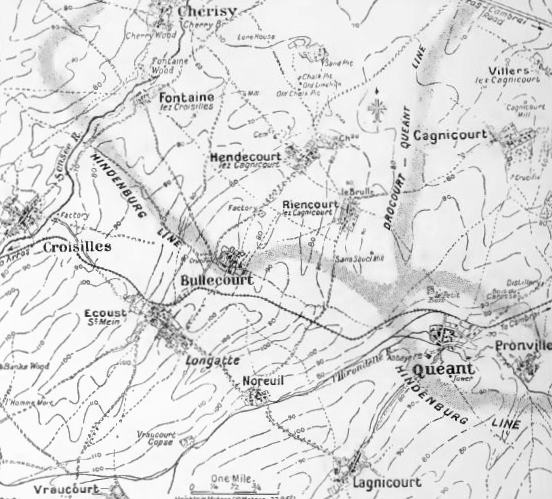
Relief map showing Hindenburg Line (Siegfriedstellung) and Wotan Line (Wotanstellung) defences around Bullecourt and Quéant, 1917

The Hindenburg Line defences enclosing the village of Bullecourt formed a re-entrant for about 2,500 yd (2,300 m) to the Balkonstellung (Balcony Trench) around Quéant, defended by the élite German 27th Division. (Note: In the Report of the Battles Nomenclature Committee (1921), subsidiary operations to the main Battle of Arras were labelled "Flanking Operations to the Arras Offensive".) On 8 April it was announced that wire cutting, begun on 5 April, would take another eight days. (Note: Despite transfers to Flanders, the Fifth Army had 26 batteries of medium and heavy howitzers but overcrowded roads caused many hold-ups. When the Bapaume railway station opened on 6 April, train delays caused huge traffic jams, made worse because lorries could carry only half-loads because of the German road demolitions. The heavy guns of the 1st Anzac Corps fired 1,100 rounds on 3 April, 1,695 and from 5 to 8 April averaged 4,000 rounds per day and managed to fire 6,025 rounds on 9 April.) At dusk on 9 April, patrols went forward and found that the Hindenburg Line was occupied but that the wire cutting bombardment had made several lanes through the wire. Preparations were made in a rush, the 4th Australian Division to attack with two brigades, the 4th on the right and 12th on the left. The attack had to cover 500 yd (460 m) to the wire and another 100 yd (91 m) to the first trench at 4:30 a.m., about an hour and 48 minutes before the sun rose, to evade crossfire in the re-entrant between Quéant and Bullecourt. Artillery-fire would continue as normal until zero hour then maintain barrages on the flanks.

At 1:00 a.m. Bullecourt was subjected to a gas bombardment by Livens projectors and Stokes 4-inch mortars as the six Australian battalions assembled out in the snow of no man's land and waited for the tanks to arrive. The left flank of the 12th Australian Brigade was only 400 yd (370 m) from Bullecourt and dawn was approaching. Zero hour was put back but the tanks had only reached Noreuil and Holmes ordered the infantry back under cover; snow began to fall again and shielded the retirement. (Note: IR 120 in Bullecourt spotted the Australians but were distracted by the 2/7th and 2/8th battalions, West Yorkshire Regiment.) Patrols of the 2/7th and 2/8th battalions, West Yorkshire Regiment began to advance from 4:35 a.m. and at 5:10 a.m. the patrols began to retire having suffered 162 casualties.

==== 11 April ====
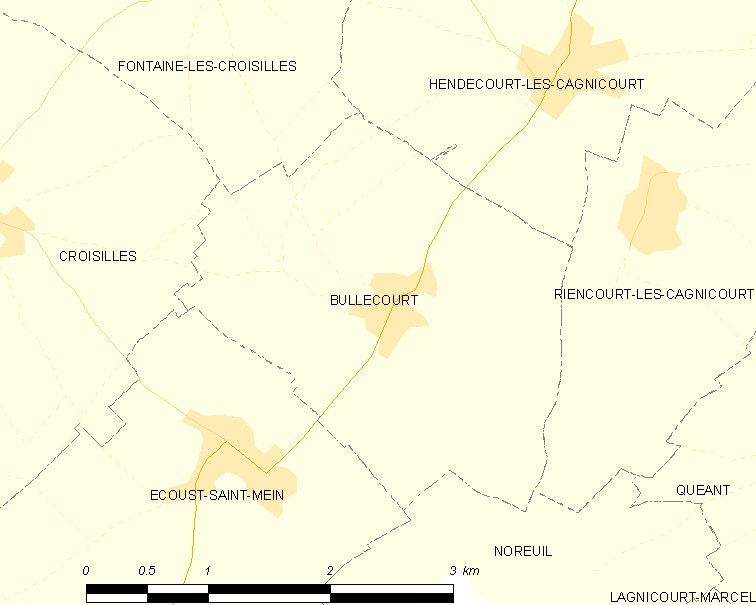
Modern map of Bullecourt and vicinity (commune FR insee code 62185)

At a conference at the 4th Australian Division HQ, it was decided that the infantry would advance fifteen minutes after the tanks, rather than wait on a signal from them. Only four tanks reached their start line by 4:30 a.m. but drowning the sound of their engines with machine-gun fire failed and they were heard in the German defences. The tank on the right flank deviated to the right, suffered mechanical difficulties and returned to the railway. Another tank also veered right and crossed the first trench of the Balkonstellung opposite Grenadier Regiment 123 and was knocked out by machine-guns firing armour-piercing (K bullet) ammunition. The next tank to reach the German lines was snagged by wire then crossed the first trench before being knocked out. The last tank started late followed a similar path to the first. The four tanks comprising the left-hand section were late and two were knocked out short of the German trenches; the third tank arrived behind the Australian infantry and silenced a machine-gun in Bullecourt. The tank was hit twice, returned to the railway and was hit again. (Note: Falls wrote that reports that tanks got into Riencourt and Hendecourt were caused by the foreshortening effect of the rolling down land. An Australian forward observation officer reported that two tanks and 200 infantry penetrated Hendecourt and that Indian cavalry could be seen west of Riencourt; no cavalry of the Sialkot Brigade came within 1.5 mi (2.4 km) of the village.)

The Australian infantry in the German defences were cut off. When the 4th Australian Brigade ran out of grenades it was forced back and the remnants of the brigade not taken prisoner tried to retreat and suffered many more casualties. In the 12th Australian Brigade, the 46th Australian Battalion in the first trench was forced out and the 48th Australian Battalion further forward was surrounded. The 48th Australian Battalion bombed its way back to the first trench. The artillery of the neighbouring 2nd Guard Division and 220th Division added to the defensive barrage in front of Bullecourt and prevented any renewal of the Australian attack. As the Australians were being forced back, they were unable to salvage ammunition and grenades from the dead and wounded. The British artillery had eventually begun to fire a barrage but this fell on the Australian-occupied trenches, making them untenable. The senior surviving Australian officer ordered the second trench to be evacuated and then the first. At 12:25 p.m. the 48th Australian Battalion, the last in the German trenches, made an orderly retreated over the bullet-swept ground. By noon the German counter-attack had succeeded; few Australians had managed to re-cross no man's land through artillery and machine-gun fire.

=== Plan ===
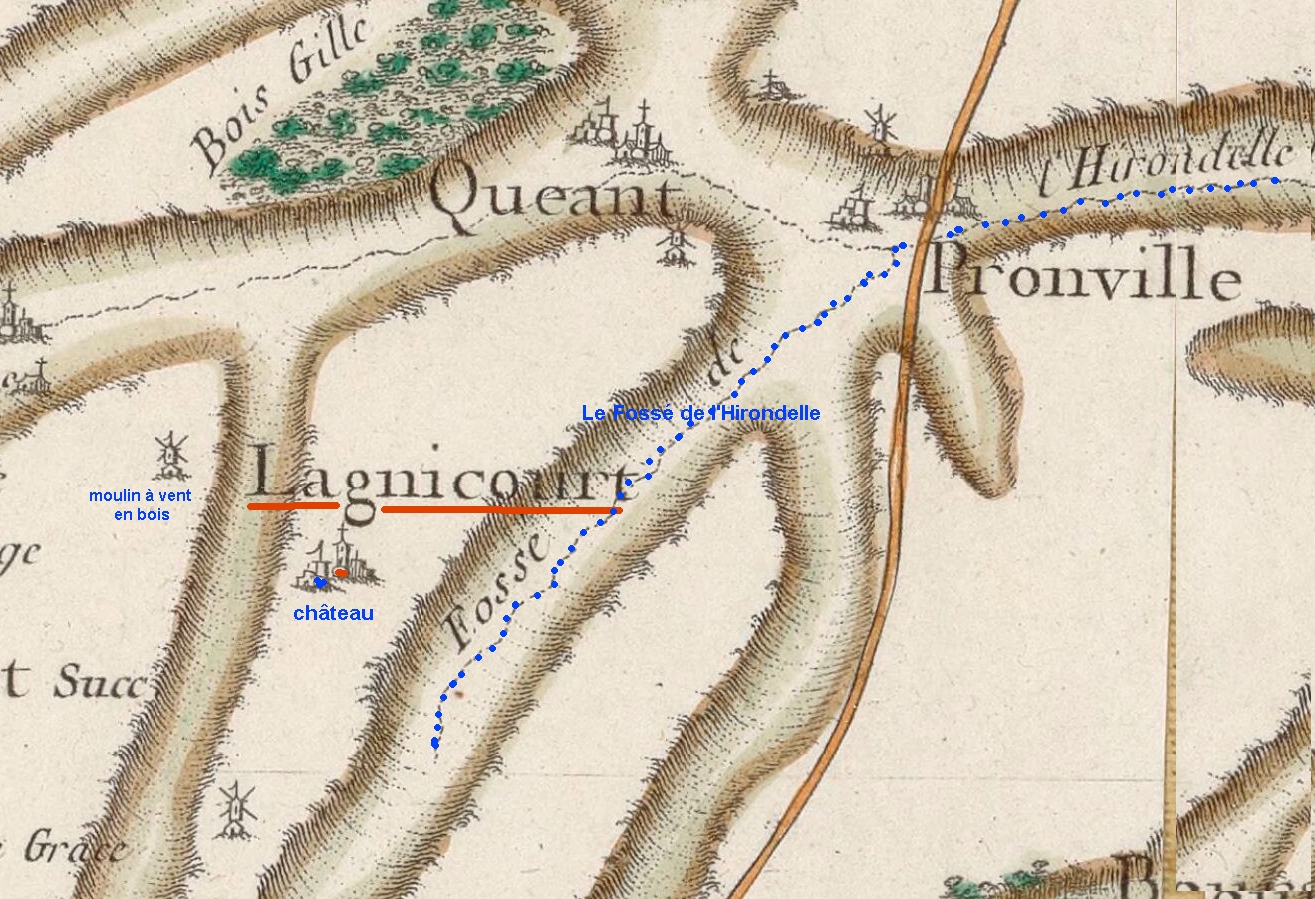
Drawing of Lagnicourt and vicinity showing shaded relief

Apart from British artillery bombardments, the area around Bullecourt had been quiet since the German victory on 11 April. The XIV Reserve Corps detected that the 1st Australian Division had taken over part of the front of the 4th Australian Division for the attack of 11 April, holding an 6.8 mi (11 km) front southwards from Quéant. Casualties in the 4th Australian Division on 11 April led to the 1st Australian Division taking over another 0.62 mi (1 km) of front to the north. Major Friedrich von Miaskowski, the Gruppe chief of staff, proposed to attack while the Australian and British troops opposite had not finished consolidating their positions and were disorganised after the attack on 11 April. On 13 April, Moser requested permission from the 6th Army HQ to use the 3rd Guard Division and the 2nd Guard Reserve Division on the left flank of the Gruppe for a spoiling attack on a 2.5 mi (4 km) from Lagnicourt southwards to Hermies.

Army Group Rupprecht and the 6th Army HQ were willing to support any serious proposal for offensive action and added the 38th Division (38. Division) and the 4th Ersatz Division from Gruppe Cambrai south of Gruppe Quéant to the attack. To be quick, Moser wrote the plan and operations orders and Miaskowski prepared the plans for the support and supply services. The plans for Unternehmen Sturmbock were issued by the early hours of 14 April for an attack at 4:00 a.m. on 15 April. The 2nd Guard Reserve Division was to attack on the northern flank to occupy Noreuil and Lagnicourt, the 3rd Guard Division to the left (south) was to attack Morchies and Boursies. Doignies and Demicourt were the objectives of the 38th Division and Hermies on the southern flank was the target of the 4th Ersatz Division. The attacking battalions were to be followed by engineers and in the latter two divisions by elements of their divisional sturmbataillonen, flame-thrower (flammenwerfer) detachment and detachments of field artillery. Two or three batteries of field artillery each were attached to each brigade.

(From north to south [right to left] details from Bean [1982])

- 2nd Guard Reserve Division
  - I Battalion Infantry Regiment 91, I & III Bn IR 77, I & III Bn IR 15 (first line); II Bn IR 77, II Bn IR 91 (second Line)
- 3rd Guard Division
  - III Bn Lehr Regiment, I Bn LR, II Bn LR, I Bn Guard Fusilier, II Bn GF, III Bn GF (first line)
- 38th Division
  - III Bn IR 96, III Bn IR 95, II Bn IR 95, III & I Bn IR 94 (first line)
- 4th Ersatz Division
  - II Bn IR 360 and III Bn IR 360 [Regiment von Warnstedt], I Bn IR 361 and I Bn IR 362 [Regiment von Hugo] (first Line); III Bn IR 361, divisional Sturmabteilung (second line)

Moser briefed Falkenhausen that the attack would prevent the British from closing up to the main Siegfriedstellung defences, inflict as many casualties as possible and destroy equipment, especially artillery. The casualties and destruction inflicted on the opposing forces would limit their offensive capacity opposite Gruppe Quéant and Gruppe Arras for long enough for the Germans to complete their defensive fortifications. The attack would demonstrate that the Germans retained considerable offensive power and that the retirement from the Noyon Salient had not diminished the fighting power of the German infantry. The divisions involved had mostly got warning orders to the attacking regiments by 8:00 a.m. on 14 April which left them little time to prepare and late changes took until late in the evening to arrive. The 3rd Guard Division took over the left of the 2nd Guard Division around Pronville. Bottlenecks delayed many of the troops as they moved forward to assemble for the attack. Reserve Infantry Regiment 91 due to attack on the right flank from north of Quéant towards Noreuil, took too long to reach its start line and attacked nearly an hour late.

== Attack ==
=== 4th Ersatz Division ===
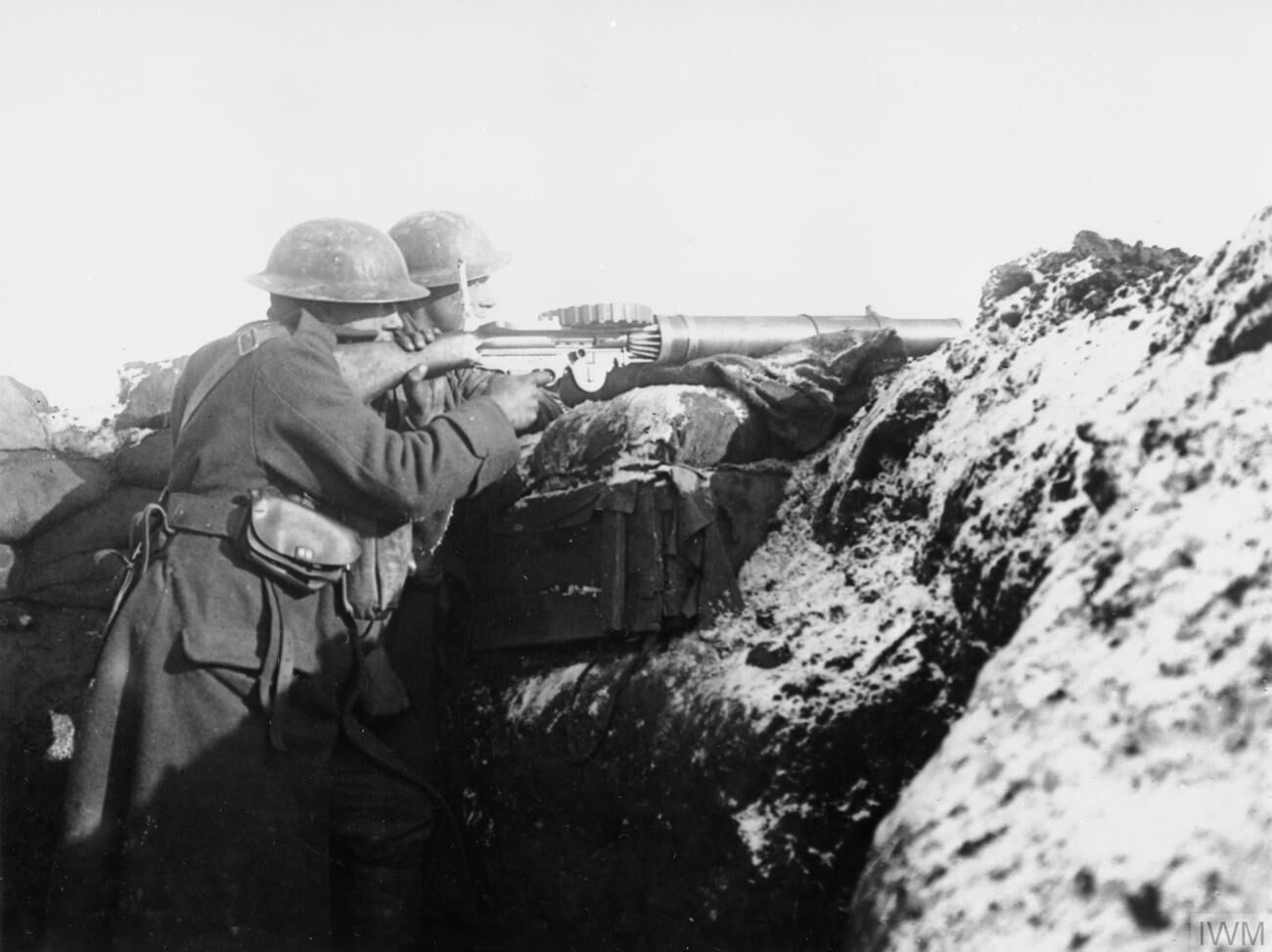
Example of a Lewis gun post

The 4th Ersatz Division attacked with four battalions, Regiment von Hugo and Regiment von Warnstedt, the brigade commander Generalmajor Johann von Mechow retaining the Stoßtruppen and III Bataillon, IR 361 as a reserve. The advance ran into trouble as soon as it began, the German artillery firing short; a flare signal warning the artillery was fired but went unnoticed. The signal was fired again and this silhouetted the advancing troops. The second and third waves hurried forward to escape the German bombardment, bunched up and Australian posts were encountered far in advance of the positions that they were thought to occupy.

The recent move forward of the Australian outpost line had gone undetected and Australian small-arms fire was sufficient to stop the German advance. Soon after dawn another two companies went forward to plug a gap in the centre of the attack but German artillery-fire failed to suppress the rifle and machine-gun fire from the Australian infantry. At 3:00 p.m. the attacking troops were ordered to retire. The German infantry, with eleven Australian prisoners, was untroubled and outposts were left on the right flank, south of the Bapaume–Cambrai road, covering the left flank of the 38th Division.

=== 38th Division ===
Five battalions of infantry from the 38th Division attacked from the village of Mœuvres and return-fire from Australian outposts caused the attacking waves to merge, the third wave suffering severe casualties from machine-gun fire. Some troops claimed to have entered the north end of Demicourt and the eastern fringe of Boursies, which changed hands several times. At 5:45 a.m. news arrived of the success of the attack beyond the right of the divisional flank and the division was ordered to attack Louveral along with the 3rd Guard Division. Just before 8:00 a.m. news arrived that the 3rd Guard Division was in Louveral park and the 38th Divisional artillery was ordered to lengthen its range to beyond the village. After two hours the report was found to be false and a plan to attack the park at noon after another artillery preparation when reports arrived at 10:30 a.m. that the advance of the divisions on either flank had been stopped with many casualties and that the 2nd Guard Reserve Division had been forced back to the Siegfriedstellung. The division retired at 8:00 p.m. without difficulty, claiming to have brought 147 prisoners with it.

=== 3rd Guard Division ===
The 3rd Guard Division attacked with the III, I and II battalions (bataillonen) Lehr Regiment, on the right and the I, II and III bataillonen, Guard Fusilier Regiment, on the left and Grenadier Regiment 9 in reserve to hold the Siegfriedstellung. The three battalions on the left flank were echeloned (stepped back) to the left in case the 38th Division advance was stopped short. The Guards were on unfamiliar ground, having had no time for reconnaissance. Regiment Guard Fusilier had billeted 10 mi (16 km) back until nightfall on 14 April when it began its approach march in cold and stormy weather. During the attack the left and centre battalions surprised and overran posts of the 11th Australian Battalion but then ran into camouflaged machine-gun nests which had to be attacked. The process of reducing the Australian machine-guns was costly and even with reinforcements from the second wave, the advance was halted. On the right flank of Regiment Guard Fusilier, the attack was stopped by the left flank company of the 11th Australian Battalion. On the right flank, the III Bataillon Regiment Lehr crossed the path of a battalion of the 2nd Guard Reserve Division and was so badly delayed that it reached its assembly area an hour late. The regiment advanced at 4:00 a.m. instead of 3:00 a.m., its attack was spotted immediately and driven under cover except on the right. Some troops got into Lagnicourt with the 2nd Guard Reserve Division and retired at the same time, the left flank remaining until 8;00 p.m.

=== 2nd Guard Reserve Division ===
The infantry of the 2nd Guard Reserve Division (Generalmajor Axel von Petersdorff) knew the ground, having fought over it while retiring on the Siegfriedstellung. Petersdorff dispensed with the preliminary hurricane bombardment due from 3:00 to 3:20 a.m., to get the attackers into the Australian artillery positions before the alarm was raised. I Bataillon RIR 91 (I/RIR 91) provided a flank guard to the north, I and III/RIR 77 attacked on the right and centre, with the I and III/RIR 15 on the left. The number of attackers, their knowledge of the ground and the silent approach succeeded and RIR 15 reported at 3:25 a.m. that it had received only sporadic machine-gun fire. At 3:50 a.m. RIR 77 sent a message that the spur between Noreuil and Lagnicourt had been captured with few losses and no artillery-fire from the defenders, RIR 15 occupying Lagnicourt at 4:00 a.m. At 5:15 a.m. I/RIR 77 attacked Noreuil up the valley of the Hirondelle stream and III/RIR 77 tried to capture the Australian artillery near the village. On the left flank, RIR 15 were surprised to overrun the Australian artillery in the Lagnicourt valley, thought still to be near Vaulx-Vraucourt, whose move had not been seen by German air reconnaissance. At about 6:00 a.m. the German troops in the Hirondelle valley and the spur began to receive artillery-fire from the Australian guns west of Ecoust and at Morchies, directed by the crew of a British artillery-observation aircraft who flew over the battlefield at very low altitude.

The increasing quantity of artillery-fire stopped the German advance by 7:15 a.m. and reports arrived that RIR 15 was withdrawing, followed by the artillery-observation aircraft. The regiment was ordered to recapture the spur at about 8:15 a.m. but the commanders of III/RIR 77 and I/RIR 15 had conferred on the Noreuil–Lagnicourt road and decided to withdraw. The 9th Company of RIR 77 had advanced towards Noreuil over the spur and was cut off but the rest moved back under artillery- and machine-gun fire to a line about 1,000 yd (910 m) in advance of the Siegfriedstellung, which was under severe bombardment, until 10:00 a.m. when the troops returned to their positions behind a line of outposts; the bombardment died down and the troops in the outposts returned by 11:50 a.m. The division claimed to have demolished 22 guns, damaged another eleven and taken 283 prisoners as pioneers blocked wells in Lagnicourt by detonating demolition charges not blown when the village had been captured on 26 March. Paperwork showing the dispositions of the 1st Australian Division were also recovered.

=== 1st Australian Division ===
At 4:05 a.m. a sentry alerted a post of the 3rd Australian Battalion, 1st Australian Brigade which opened rapid fire with Lewis guns and rifles and repulsed the troops of the 4th Ersatz Division but moments later all the posts on about 1,000 yd (910 m) were attacked. The German troops were visible in the glare of their flares and were shot down or forced to retreat. On the left flank, the 4th Australian Battalion similarly repulsed attacks by the 38th Division but lost a post on the road east from Demicourt to a Flammenwerfer attack and posts around the Bapaume–Cambrai road were forced to retreat. Counter-attacks failed but the troops in Boursies held on with reinforcements. A post in a chapel about 300 yd (270 m) east of Boursies was subjected to a determined attack but survived and the brigade commander boldly sent two companies from Beaumetz to reinforce the 3rd Australian Brigade to the north, which was under attack by part of the 38th Division and the 3rd Guard Division.

The attack on the 3rd Australian Brigade had begun with a hurricane bombardment at 4:00 a.m.; the 11th Australian Battalion on the right repulsed a frontal attack but German troops pressed forward along a gully on the Australian right and attacked the posts one by one from front and behind. The post garrisons fought on and gained time for a reserve company and the reinforcements from the 10th Battalion to form a line from the original position, bending back to the 4th Australian Battalion north of Boursies. The left flank of the 12th Australian Battalion was attacked first and the right flank about an hour later and easily repulsed the Germans but as the sun rose, many troops of the 2nd Guard Reserve Division could be seen south of Lagnicourt. The left flank company of the 12th Australian Battalion and the right of the 17th Australian Battalion (5th Australian Brigade, 2nd Australian Division) were overrun without the warning of a preliminary bombardment. The German infantry rushed Lagnicourt and in places advancing Germans and retreating Australians moved in parallel in the twilight.

=== 2nd Australian Division ===
Only the 17th Australian Battalion of the 5th Australian Brigade, 2nd Australian Division was involved in the attack and was pushed back to the Bullecourt–Lagnicourt road and then a trench further back covering Noreuil. The German infantry had captured four batteries of the II Australian Field Artillery Brigade at Lagnicourt and three of the I Australian Field Artillery Brigade further west. The Germans were within 1,500 yd (1,400 m) of another battery at Maricourt Wood and nine batteries south-west of Noreuil were also in danger. Two companies of the 12th Australian Battalion took over a sunken part of the Lagnicourt–Beaumetz road, about 300 yd (270 m) south of Lagnicourt and fought back-to-back against attacks from north and south. On the road to Beugny the HQ of the 12th Australian Battalion held its ground until reinforced. By 6:20 a.m. the centre and left flank artillery groups of the division barraged Lagnicourt and Noreuil and the heavy guns of the 1st Anzac Corps ignored the danger of being captured and continued to fire. Australian resistance prevented the Germans debouching from Lagnicourt to the south or south-east. The commander of the 5th Australian Brigade secured Noreuil, a ridge between it and Noreuil and higher ground near Bois de Vaulx.

The 19th Australian Battalion at Noreuil and the ridge was just in time to defeat an attack from Lagnicourt and another up the valley of the Hirondelle Stream. The 20th Australian Battalion made a careful advance from Vaulx Vraucourt and reached the Morchies–Noreuil road by 7:00 a.m. As soon as it was light, the Germans in the salient from Lagnicourt to south of Noreuil had come under fire from three sides and the 9th Australian Battalion began the Australian reply. The 20th Australian Battalion attacked soon after as did the 19th Australian Battalion around Noreuil as soon as the barrage was lifted. Many of the German troops surrendered and others shot while retreating. Reports from a reconnaissance aircraft led to every gun in range bombarding the Hindenburg Line wire to catch German troops as they returned. Lagnicourt was quickly recaptured and found that only five field guns and a howitzer had been destroyed. Others had explosive charges on them but these had not been detonated, despite the Germans occupying the village for about two hours (the Germans who got back claimed 22 guns destroyed). German covering posts from Lagnicourt to Demicourt returned at dusk.

== Aftermath ==
=== Analysis ===
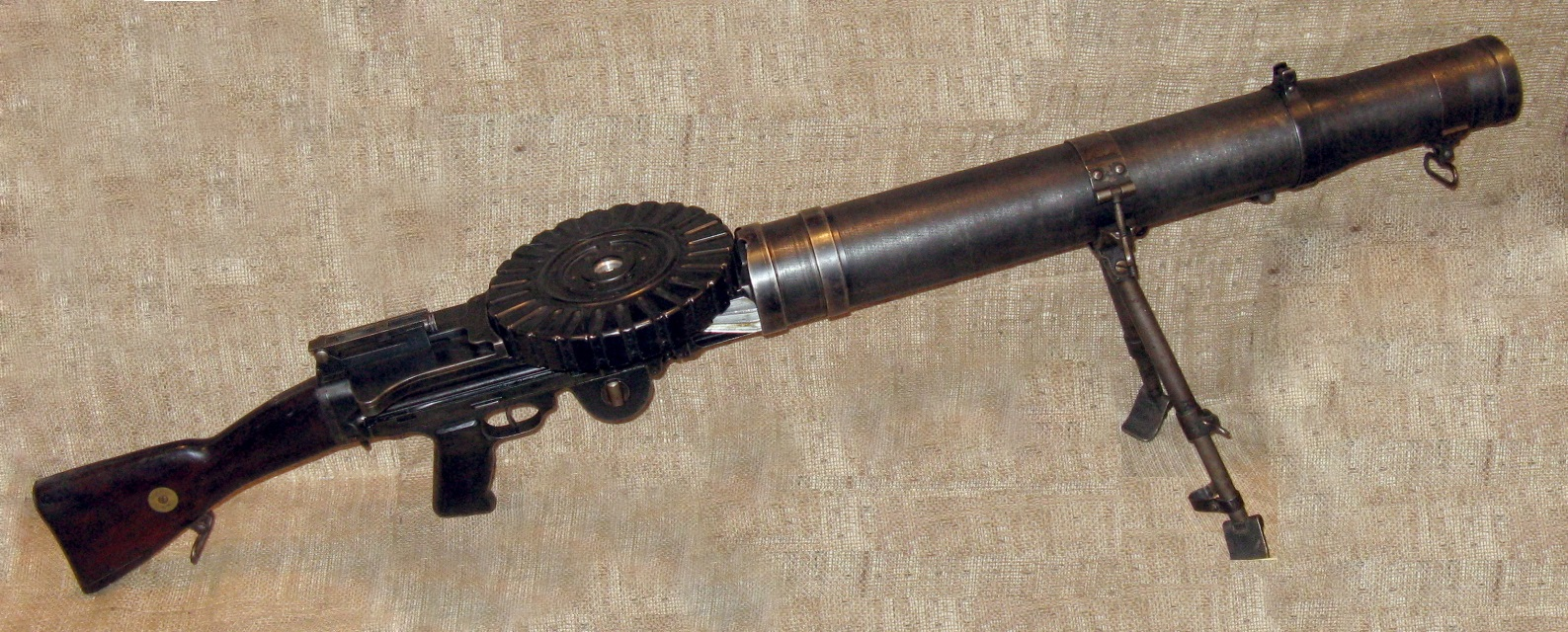
Lewis gun

In 1933 Charles Bean, the Australian official historian, wrote that 23 infantry battalions and attached storm troops, amounting to 16,000 men, had attacked 4,000 Australian troops, reached the objective in only one place and had soon been forced back, with about double the casualties that they had inflicted. Bean wrote that in his war diary (volume II, p. 143 et seq.), Rupprecht had concluded that apart from the destruction of 22 guns Sturmbock had been something of a failure and cost about nine per cent of the attacking force. Rupprecht made no comment about the claim made by Moser that the attack had compelled the Australians to reinforce the area and OHL apparently did not believe that Sturmbock reduced the pressure at Arras.

The only reserves that were moved after the attack were within the 1st Anzac Corps. German prisoners complained about the short notice of the attack and lack of time to reconnoitre, which was also noted in the divisional after-action reports read by Rupprecht. Moser called the operation the latest example of a big attack on the western front and that a memorandum was published containing a collation of the reports. The Germans had found that the Australian Lewis guns had been of great effectiveness, "cleverly emplaced and bravely fought" and many reports noted the need for a similar weapon.

In 1939, Wolfgang Foerster, the editor of volume XII of Der Weltkrieg, the Reichsarchiv official history, wrote that the success of the attack was limited by the short notice and insufficient artillery support. The authors agreed with Moser that several days were necessary to arrange a night attack but disagreed that the situation at Arras was too dangerous to delay; the preparations could have been carried out over a longer period and been camouflaged to retain surprise. Jack Sheldon wrote in 2015 that the Fifth Army reacted to the attack by consolidating its positions in the area as quickly as possible. That the Australians had been surprised and that their artillery had been vulnerable led to more advanced posts being established and many more clashes between patrols in no man's land.

The British (sic) seemed not to have been expecting our morning visit. We surprised them while they were still asleep and when they met us they were still only half-dressed. One Tommy ran through our lines. In his hurry he had only been able to put on one boot. Despite the seriousness of the situation, we laughed heartily at that.

— Wehrmann (Soldier) Rings RIR 77

=== Casualties ===
In The Fifth Army (1931 [1968]), Hubert Gough wrote that about 1,700 Germans were killed and 360 were taken prisoner. In 1939, the historians of the Reichsarchiv wrote that the attackers inflicted 1,500 casualties took nearly 500 prisoners and 22 machine-guns; four artillery batteries had been overrun but only five guns were destroyed. The attack was described as a costly success, the German suffering 1,600 casualties and losing 360 prisoners. Most of the casualties came from well-positioned machine-guns and because some troops attacked late and were impeded by marshy ground, one battalion being delayed so badly that it attacked at dawn. In volume IV of the Australian Official History, The Australian Imperial Force in France, 1917 (1933 [1982]) Charles Bean wrote that the attackers suffered 2,313 casualties, 829 in the 2nd Guard Reserve Division, 545 in the 3rd Guard Division, 519 in the 38th Division and 420 in the 4th Ersatz Division; the Australians took 362 prisoners. Bean wrote that the German divisions exaggerated their bag of prisoners, the 2nd Guard Reserve Division claiming 283 alone. The 1st Anzac Corps suffered 1,010 casualties, of which 646 were suffered by the 1st Australian Division and 364 by the 2nd Australian Division; a minimum of 300 Australians were taken prisoner. Cyril Falls, the British official historian, wrote in the History of the Great War (1917 part I, 1940) that the 2nd Guard Reserve Division suffered more than 800 casualties, the greatest loss among the divisions involved. In The Blood Tub (1998 [2000]), Jonathan Walker wrote that the Australians suffered more than 1,000 casualties and the loss of five artillery pieces, inflicting 2,300 casualties on the attackers.

=== Subsequent operations ===
The front of the 27th Division was quiet on 15 April but 16 April was a fine spring day and bombardments from artillery up to 9.4 in (240 mm) fell on the area, indicating that another attack was likely. Grenadier Regiment 123 moved into line between Infantry Regiment 120 and Infantry Regiment 124 and the right flank of the 2nd Guard Reserve Division closed up to IR 124, narrowing the regimental frontages and increasing the depth of the defence. The regiments had four companies in the front line, two in close support and two in reserve in the Artillerieschutzstellung; the 1st Musketen Company, equipped with light machine-guns, reinforced the infantry. Resting units only moved back 2.5–3.1 mi (4–5 km) and were kept busy repairing defences and digging more reserve positions at night. An attack was anticipated on a line from Bullecourt to Riencourt and Quéant because of the extent of British artillery-fire and strafing attacks by British aircraft. German artillery replied with harassing and destructive bombardments which, at dawn every day, were directed at assembly areas and jumping-off lines.
