= Dietrich von Falkenberg =

German statesman

- Born: 1580; Herstelle, Holy Roman Empire
- Died: 20 May 1631 (aged 50–51) Magdeburg, Holy Roman Empire
- Allegiance: (Swedish Empire) Sweden
- Service years: 1630–1631
- Rank: Commandant
- Conflicts: Thirty Years' War: Sack of Magdeburg

Dietrich von Falkenberg (1580 – 20 May 1631) was a German statesman and army officer in Swedish service, who commanded the defence of Magdeburg during the course of the Thirty Years' War.

== Biography ==
Falkenberg was born in Herstelle in 1580, to the Drost of the Imperial Abbey of Corvey Christoph von Falkenberg and his wife Appollonia. He was sent to the Landgraviate of Hesse-Kassel where he served as a councillor for its ruler Moritz. In 1615, he was dispatched to the Swedish court. There he managed to gain the trust of the Swedish king Gustavus Adolphus becoming his Hovmarskalk and thus entering Swedish service.

== Military career ==
In 1630, Sweden intervened into the Thirty Years' War on the side of the Protestants. On 27 July, Magdeburg's former administrator Christian Wilhelm of Brandenburg slipped into the city, seizing back power. Christian Wilhelm immediately declared his allegiance for Sweden. Falkenberg was appointed to the rank of Commandant and sent to Magdeburg, which he managed to enter in October by disguising himself as a sailor. He then presented the city's council with a letter reassuring them of Sweden's support in their struggle against the Holy Roman Empire and the Catholic League. Soon afterwards, Imperial general Gottfried Heinrich Graf zu Pappenheim chased Magdeburg's militia into the city, imposing a siege. In the meantime, Falkenberg became the head of Magdeburg's garrison, organized a recruitment drive and strengthened the fortifications. The majority of Magdeburg's population appeared reluctant as they have grown tired of the war, the exception being the local radical Protestant clergy.

Gustavus deemed the defence of Magdeburg as particularly important as its fall would discourage other German Protestants from joining his alliance. Nevertheless, he preferred to march his army east, towards eastern Pomerania and the Oder river, instead to relieving Magdeburg. In March 1631, Pappenheim's initial blockading force rose to 25,000 after he was joined by Johann Tserclaes, Count of Tilly. Tilly focused his attention on Magdeburg taking the suburbs of Sudenburg and Neustadt on 21 and 23 April respectively. On 24 April, Tilly requested the Magdeburgers to surrender or face a direct assault. The city's council urged Falkenberg to surrender honorably, however he continued to insist that the Swedes would arrive in time to relieve the garrison. The odds were stacked against the defenders, as the city was guarded by only 2,500 trained troops and 5,000 conscripted civilians (2,000 of whom were children). Furthermore, the Swedes were at a distance of 90 kilometres (56 mi). The Imperialist installed their artillery on the city's perimeter, launching a fierce bombardment. On 18 May, Falkenberg defiantly rejected a second Imperialist proposal.

At 8.00 a.m., 20 May, 18,000 Imperial and League troops stormed the city from five directions. A city council meeting was interrupted by news of an enemy penetration beyond the city's walls. Two companies of Croatian riders had infiltrated a poorly defended gate on the bank of the Elbe. Falkenberg and the rest of the defenders were caught off guard. Falkenberg was struck by a bullet and killed while trying to organize a counterattack. The Imperialists set fire to a house that was held by a group of musketeers, the fire quickly spread, enveloping the whole city. In the ensuing chaos, a part of the attackers went rogue, looting, committing rapes and massacring civilians for several days, while the rest attempted to extinguish the fire. In all, 20,000 Magdeburgers were killed, making the Sack of Magdeburg a cause célèbre for Protestant propagandists. Gustavus was killed in the Battle of Lützen by Moritz von Falkenberg, a Catholic relative of Dietrich.

== Notes ==
Citations
