= Sack of Magdeburg =

1631 massacre of Protestants during the Thirty Years' War

Coordinates: 52°08′N 11°37′E

- Part of the Swedish phase of the Thirty Years' War
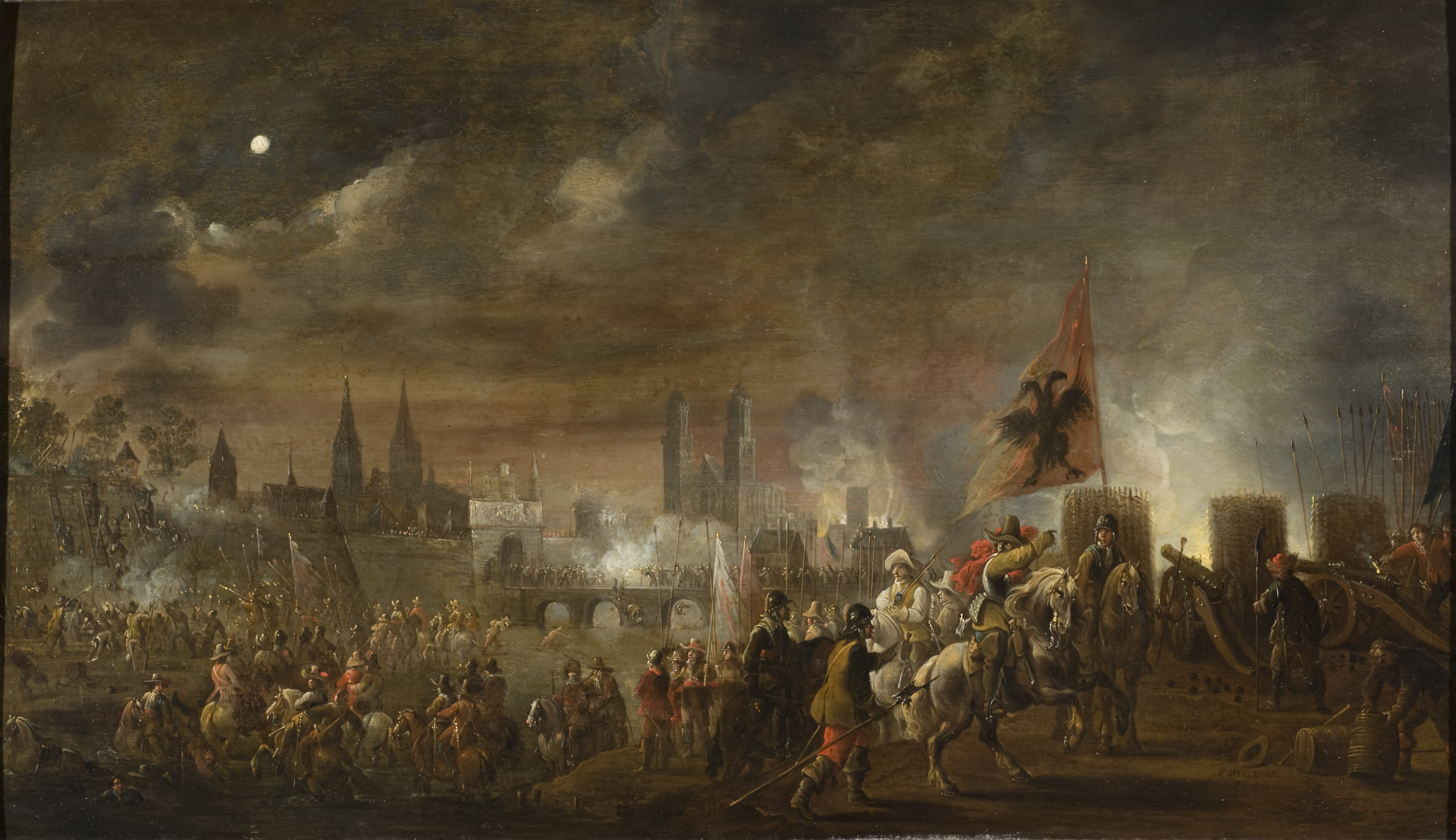
- Sack of Magdeburg
Date	20–24 May 1631
Location	Magdeburg, Archbishopric of Magdeburg, Holy Roman Empire (present-day in Saxony-Anhalt, Germany)
Result	Catholic victory
Territorial changes	Magdeburg is destroyed by the Catholics

Belligerents
Holy Roman Empire; Catholic League	Magdeburg; (yes) Sweden

Commanders and leaders
Count of Tilly; (Holy Roman Empire) Graf zu Pappenheim	(Swedish Empire) Dietrich von Falkenberg †; Christian William (POW)

Strength
24,000 during the siege; 40,000 during the sack	2,400

Casualties and losses
300 killed; 1,600 wounded	25,000 defenders and inhabitants
- Location within Saxony-Anhalt Magdeburg (Germany)

The Sack of Magdeburg, also called the Magdeburg Wedding (German: Magdeburger Hochzeit) or Magdeburg's Sacrifice (Magdeburgs Opfergang), was the destruction of the Protestant city of Magdeburg on 20–24 May 1631 by the Imperial Army and the forces of the Catholic League, resulting in the deaths of around 20,000, including both defenders and civilians. This event is considered the worst massacre of the Thirty Years' War. Magdeburg, then one of the largest cities within the borders of modern-day Germany, and having well over 25,000 inhabitants in 1630, did not recover its importance until well into the 18th century.

== Background ==
=== Archbishopric of Magdeburg ===
The archbishopric of Magdeburg was established as an ecclesiastical principality in 968, and the town and surrounding area were ruled by the archbishop.

=== Protestant Reformation ===
The citizens of Magdeburg had turned Protestant in 1524 and joined the Schmalkaldic League against the religious policies of the Catholic emperor Charles V in 1531. During the Schmalkaldic War of 1546/47, the Lower Saxon city became a refuge for Protestant scholars, which earned it the epithet Herrgotts Kanzlei (German for 'Lord's Chancellery'), but also an Imperial ban that lasted until 1562. The citizens refused to acknowledge Emperor Charles's Augsburg Interim and were besieged by Imperial troops under Maurice, Elector of Saxony in 1550/51.

==== Protestant archbishops and Administrators ====
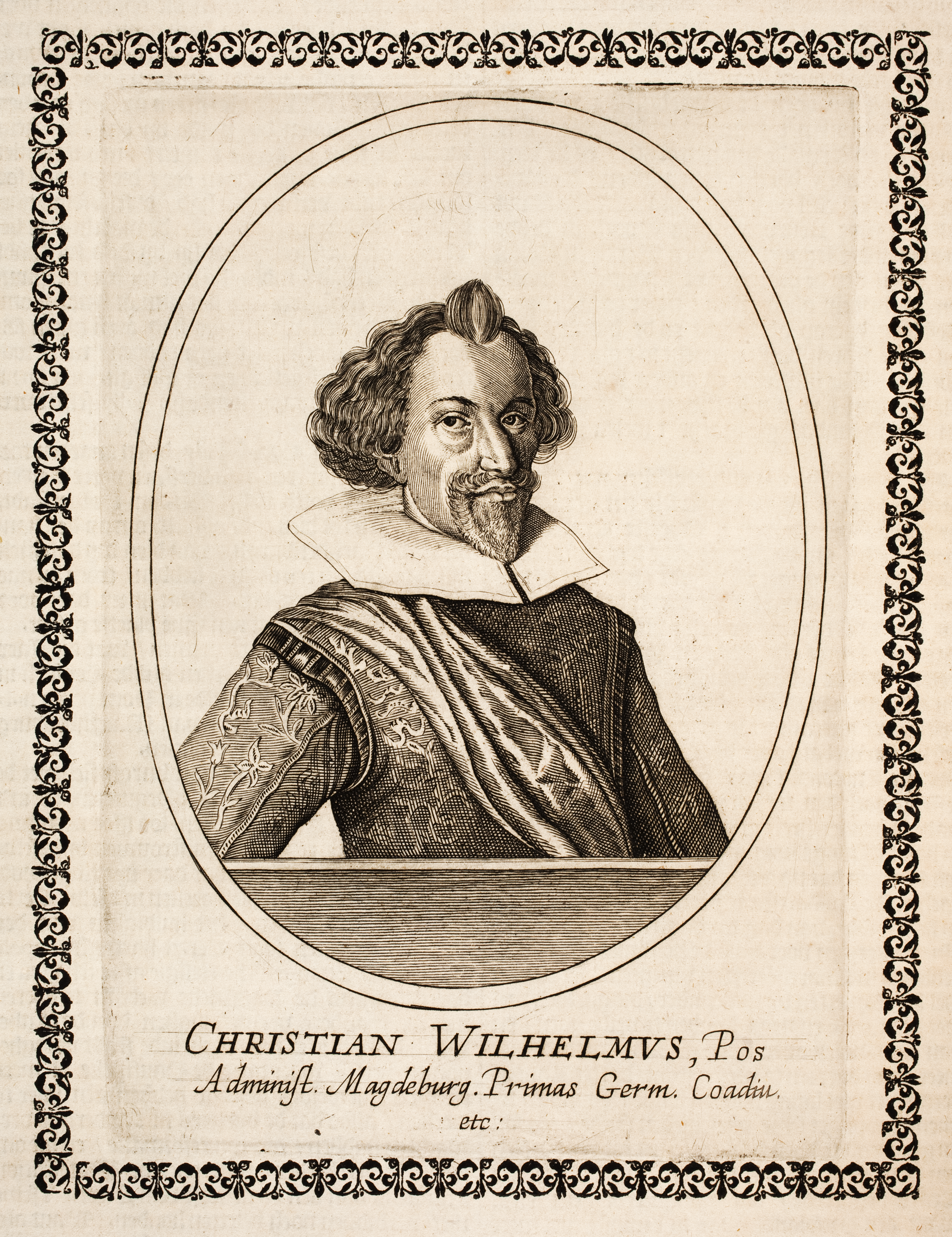
Administrator Christian William of Brandenburg, engraving by Merian

The Roman Catholic archdiocese had de facto turned void since 1557, when the last papally confirmed prince-archbishop, the Lutheran Sigismund of Brandenburg, came of age and ascended to the see.

Openly Lutheran Christian William of Brandenburg, elected to be archbishop in 1598, was denied recognition by the imperial authorities. From about 1600, he styled himself Administrator of Magdeburg, as did other Protestant German notables assigned to govern principalities that were de jure property of the Catholic church.

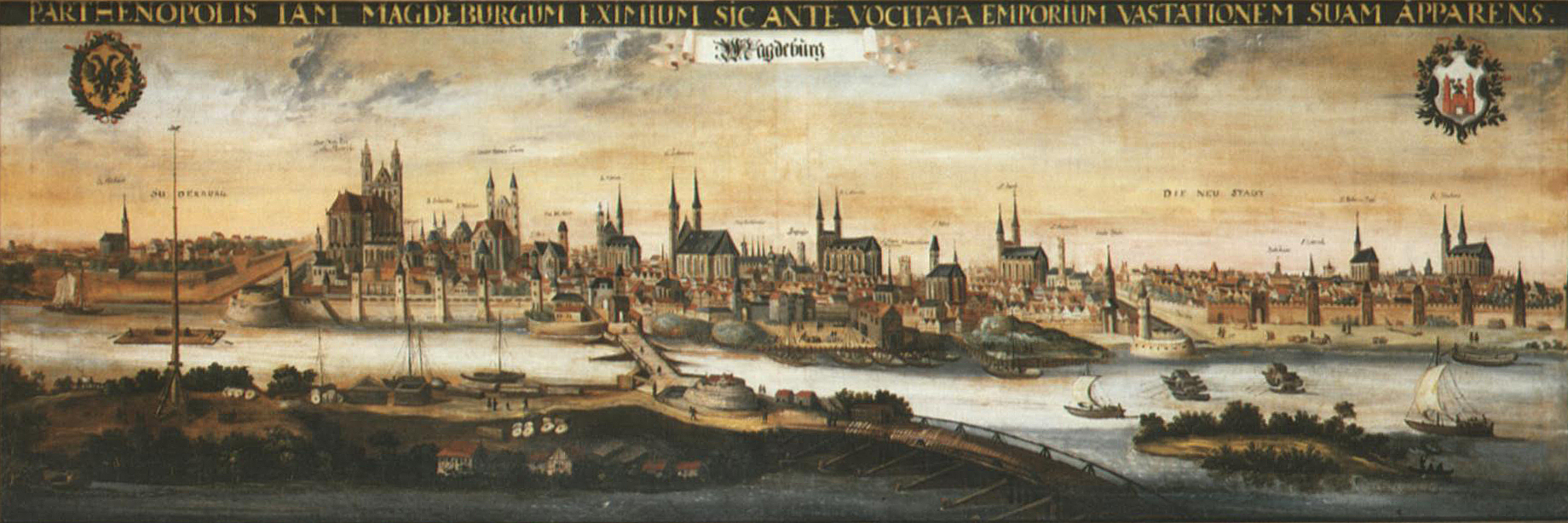
Colored engraving showing the city of Magdeburg, circa 1600

=== Alliance with the Danish king ===
During the Thirty Years' War, Administrator Christian William entered into an alliance with Denmark. In 1626, he led an army from Lower Saxony into the Battle of Dessau Bridge. After Wallenstein won this battle, Christian William fled abroad. In 1629, he fled to the court of King Gustavus Adolphus of Sweden.

As a result of these developments, in January 1628, the Magdeburg cathedral chapter deposed Christian William and elected Augustus of Wettin, 13-year-old son of John George I, Elector of Saxony, as Administrator. Augustus did not assume office immediately due to his father's unwillingness to provoke the emperor.

=== Edict of Restitution ===
In March 1629, Emperor Ferdinand II passed the Edict of Restitution. It was specifically aimed at restoring the situation of the 1555 Peace of Augsburg in ecclesiastical territories that had since strayed from "legal" Catholic faith and rule. Bremen and Magdeburg were the biggest examples of territories to be restituted.

=== Alliance with the Swedish king ===
The city's councillors had been emboldened by King Gustavus Adolphus's landing in Pomerania on 6 July 1630. The Swedish king was a Lutheran Christian, and many of Magdeburg's residents were convinced that he would aid them in their struggle against the Roman Catholic Habsburg emperor, Ferdinand II. However, not all Protestant princes of the Holy Roman Empire had immediately embraced Adolphus; some believed his chief motive for entering the war was to take northern German ports, which would allow him to control commerce in the Baltic Sea.

In November 1630, King Gustavus sent ex-Administrator Christian William back to Magdeburg, along with Dietrich von Falkenberg to direct the city's military affairs. Backed by the Lutheran clergy, Falkenberg had the suburbs fortified and additional troops recruited.

==== Magdeburg besieged ====
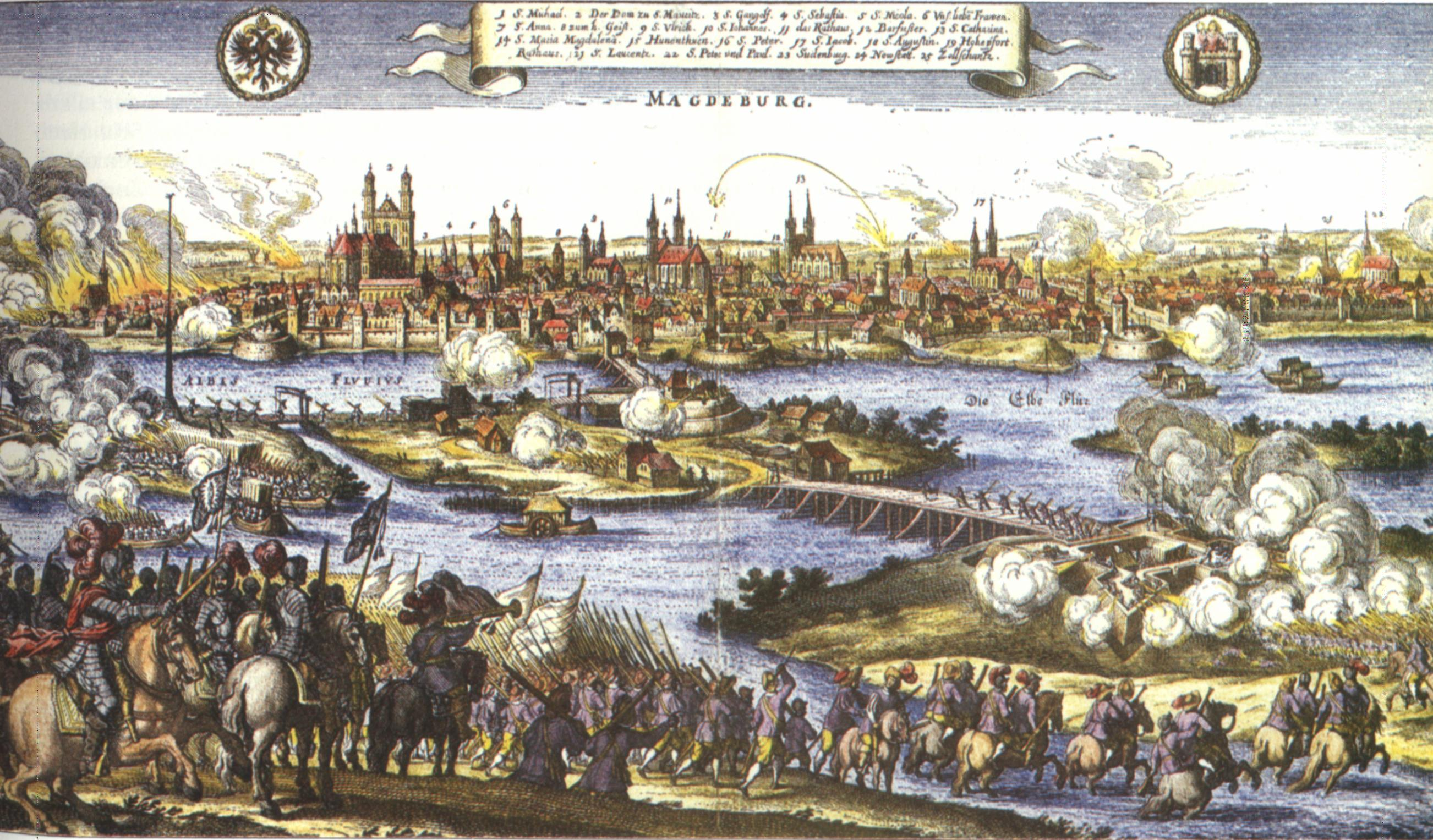
Engraving from Theatrum Europaeum, showing the fighting for Magdeburg's defense works

When the Magdeburg citizens refused to pay a tribute demanded by the emperor, Imperial forces under the command of a Flemish mercenary, Johann Tserclaes, Count of Tilly laid siege to the city within a matter of months. The city was besieged from 20 March 1631 and Tilly put his subordinate Imperial Field Marshal Gottfried Heinrich Graf zu Pappenheim, a Catholic convert, in command while he campaigned elsewhere. During fierce fighting, Imperial troops numbering 24,000, roughly the same number as Magdeburg's entire population, conquered several sconces of the city's fortification and Tilly demanded capitulation.

== Assault and sacking ==
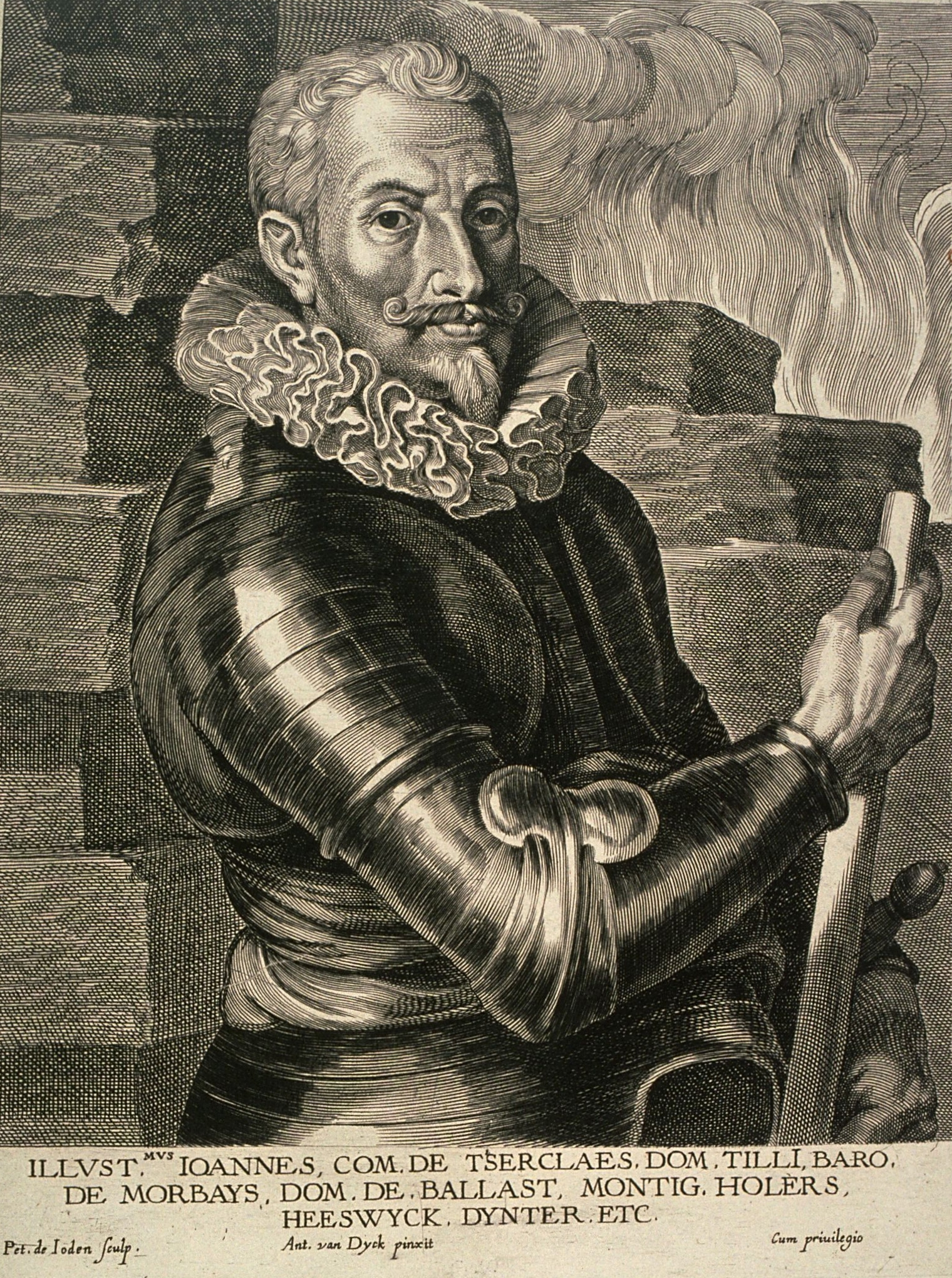
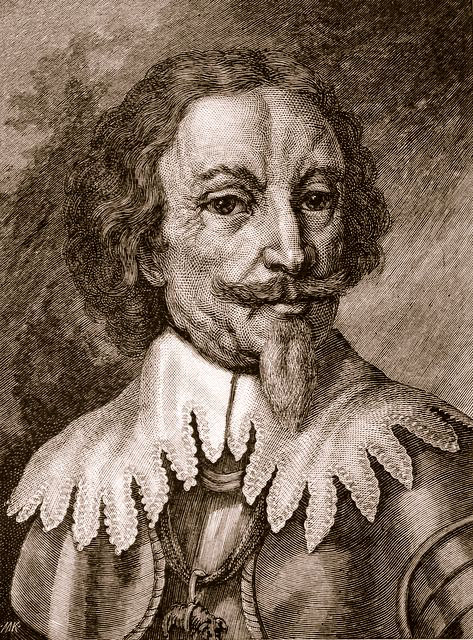
Imperial army commanders Count Tilly and Graf Pappenheim

After two months of siege and despite the Swedish victory in the Battle of Frankfurt an der Oder on 13 April 1631, Pappenheim finally persuaded Tilly, who had brought reinforcements, to storm the city on 20 May with 40,000 men under the personal command of Pappenheim. The Magdeburg citizens had hoped in vain for a Swedish relief attack. On the last day of the siege, the councillors decided it was time to sue for peace, but word of their decision did not reach Tilly in time.

In the early morning of 20 May, the attack began with heavy artillery fire. Soon afterward, Pappenheim and Tilly launched infantry attacks. The fortifications were breached and Imperial forces were able to overpower the defenders to open the Kröcken Gate, which allowed the entire army to enter the city to plunder it. The defence of the city was further weakened and demoralised when commander Dietrich von Falkenberg was shot dead by Catholic Imperial troops.

=== Sacking and arson ===
There are written reports of the attackers setting fire to single houses to dislodge persistent defenders. That the fire then spread all over the city appears to have been unintended. By ten o'clock most of the city was on fire. General Tilly sent some soldiers to save the cathedral, where 1,000 survivors had fled. Most of the victims in the sack suffocated or burned to death. The wind fanned the flames, further spreading the fire, in the end destroying 1,700 of the city's 1,900 buildings.

=== Out of control ===
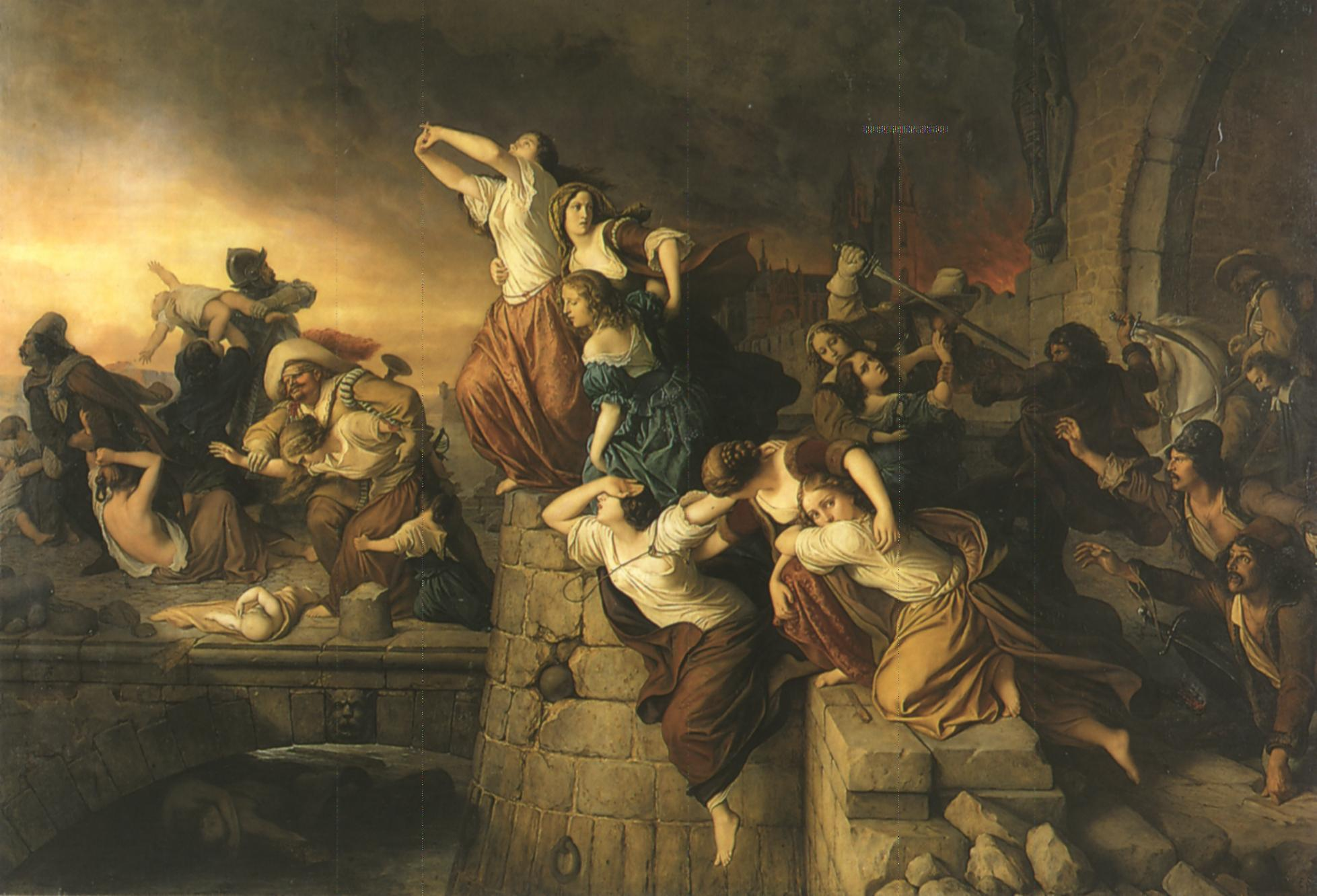
Sack of Magdeburg – The Magdeburg maidens, 1866 painting by Eduard Steinbrück

Whilst Magdeburg was razed by the fire, many Imperial soldiers supposedly went out of control. The invading soldiers had not received payment for their service and demanded valuables from every household they encountered. There were reports of rapes and torture.

When civilians ran out of things to give the soldiers, the misery really began.
For then the soldiers began to beat, frighten and threaten to shoot, skewer, hang, etc., the people.

— Otto von Guericke, Magdeburg councilman

Of the 25,000 inhabitants, only 5,000 survived, at least 1,000 of these having fled into Magdeburg Cathedral and 600 into the Premonstratensian monastery. Tilly finally ordered an end to the looting on 24 May, and a Catholic mass was celebrated at the cathedral on the next day. For another fourteen days, charred bodies were dumped in the Elbe River to prevent disease.

== Aftermath ==
A census conducted in 1632 listed only 449 inhabitants. Much of the city remained rubble until at least 1720.

=== Reactions ===
I believe that over twenty thousand souls were lost. It is certain that no more terrible work and divine punishment has been seen since the destruction of Jerusalem. (Note: It is unclear which historical event Pappenheim is referring to here, exactly. Two possible candidates are the violent conquests by the Romans in 70 CE and by the first crusader army in 1099.) All of our soldiers became rich. God with us.

— Graf Pappenheim, in a letter

After Magdeburg's capitulation to the Imperial forces, there were disputes between residents who had favoured resistance to the emperor and those who had opposed it. King Gustavus Adolphus joined the argument, claiming the citizens of Magdeburg had not been willing to pay the necessary funds for their defence.

Duke Maximilian of Bavaria, president of the Catholic League, concluded a congratulatory letter to Tilly on 1 June with the wish that "the enemies, powers and forces opposing Catholicism, the only religion offering salvation, would finally be ruined." (Note: Original German quote: vnd der Catholisch: alleinseeligmachenden Religion widersezender feinde, macht, gwalt, endtlich ruinirt.)

Pope Urban VIII wrote a congratulatory letter to Tilly on 18 June, saying: "You have washed your victorious hands in the blood of sinners." (Note: Original Latin quote: Potuisti lavare victrices manus in sanguine peccatorum. This paraphrases Psalm 58:10 (KJV), Psalm 57 in the Latin Vulgate.)

The Imperial treatment of defeated Magdeburg helped persuade many rulers to stand against the Holy Roman Emperor.

=== Notoriety ===
The devastations were so great that Magdeburgisieren (or "magdeburgization") became a common term signifying total destruction, rape and pillaging for decades. The terms "Magdeburg justice", "Magdeburg mercy" and "Magdeburg quarter" also arose as a result of the sack, used originally by Protestants when executing Roman Catholics who begged for quarter.

The massacre was forcefully described by Friedrich Schiller in his 1792 work History of the Thirty Years' War and perpetuated in a poem by Goethe. A scene of Brecht's play Mother Courage and Her Children, written in 1939, also refers to the event.

=== Political consequences ===
Administrator Christian William of Brandenburg was badly injured and taken prisoner. He later converted to Catholicism and was released. He received an annual sum of 12,000 thaler from the revenues of the Archbishopric of Magdeburg under the Peace of Prague.

After the sack, the Archbishopric of Magdeburg went to Archduke Leopold Wilhelm of Austria, youngest son of Emperor Ferdinand II, as the new Catholic administrator. The Peace of Prague (1635) confirmed his rule over the city, but three years later, Swedish troops expelled the Habsburg army and restored Augustus of Wettin (first elected in 1628) as Administrator as of October 1638. Augustus finally took full control of Magdeburg in December 1642 after a neutrality treaty was concluded with the Swedish general Lennart Torstenson. He was then able to begin the reconstruction of the city.

The Archbishopric of Magdeburg was secularized and ultimately fell to Brandenburg-Prussia upon Augustus' death in 1680.

== General and cited references ==
- Allgemeine Deutsche Biographie [General German Biography] (in German). Vol. 1. Duncker & Humblot. 1875.
- Allgemeine Deutsche Biographie [General German Biography] (in German). Vol. 4. Munich/Leipzig: Duncker & Humblot. 1876.
- Brecht, Bertolt (1939). Mutter Courage und ihre Kinder [Mother Courage and Her Children] (in German). Basel: Reiss. OCLC 72726636.
- Born, Jakob H. (1742). Abhandlung von dem Stapel-Rechte der alten Stadt Magdeburg: worinnen zugleich einige Beweise desselben geprüfet, und die Befugniße der Stadt Leipzig in Ansehung der Stapel-Gerechtigkeit erörtert werden [Treatise on the staple rights of the old city of Magdeburg: wherein some evidence of the same is examined and the powers of the city of Leipzig in view of staple rights are discussed] (in German). Leipzig: Langenheim. p. 10.
- Cante, Andreas (1995). "Die Grabanlage Erzbischof Friedrichs IV. von Magdeburg († 1552) im Halberstädter Dom" [The burial site of Archbishop Friedrich IV of Magdeburg (d. 1552) in Halberstadt Cathedral]. Zeitschrift für Kunstgeschichte (in German). 58 (4): 504–525. doi:10.2307/1482808. ISSN 0044-2992. JSTOR 1482808.
- Frusetta, James (2013). "Foreign Intervention". In Lampe, John (ed.). Ideologies and National Identities The Case of Twentieth-Century Southeastern Europe. Budapest: Central European University Press. ISBN 9786155053856.
- Goethe (1801). The Destruction of Magdeburg – via Wikisource.
- Helfferich, Tryntje (2009). The Thirty Years War: A Documentary History. Indianapolis: Hackett Pub. Co. ISBN 9780872209404.
- Herbermann, Charles, ed. (1910). "Magdeburg" . Catholic Encyclopedia. Vol. 9. New York: Robert Appleton Company.
- Issleib, S (1884). "Magdeburgs Belagerung durch Moritz von Sachsen 1550–1551" [The Siege of Magdeburg at the hands of Maurice of Saxony 1550–1551]. Neues Archiv für Sächsische Geschichte (in German). 5: 177–226.
- Medick, Hans; Selwyn, Pamela (2001). "Historical Event and Contemporary Experience: The Capture and Destruction of Magdeburg in 1631". History Workshop Journal. 52 (52). Oxford University Press: 23–48. doi:10.1093/hwj/2001.52.23. JSTOR 4289746.
- Meumann, Markus; Niefanger, Dirk (1997). Ein Schauplatz herber Angst: Wahrnehmung und Darstellung von Gewalt im 17. Jahrhundert [A scene of dire fear: Perception and portrayal of force in the 17th century] (in German). Göttingen: Wallstein. ISBN 9783892442349.
- Nolan, Cathal J. (2006). "Magdeburg, Sack of". The age of wars of religion: 1000–1650 – An Encyclopedia of Global Warfare and Civilization. Vol. 2. London; Westport, CT: Greenwood. ISBN 0313337349.
- Olson, Oliver K. (1972). "Theology of Revolution: Magdeburg, 1550–1551". The Sixteenth Century Journal. 3 (1): 70. doi:10.2307/2539904. ISSN 0361-0160. JSTOR 2539904.
- Osiander, Andreas (2001). "Sovereignty, International Relations, and the Westphalian Myth". International Organization. 55 (2): 256–257. doi:10.1162/00208180151140577. ISSN 0020-8183. JSTOR 3078632. S2CID 145407931.
- von Pastor, Ludwig (1928). Geschichte der Päpste (1623–1644) [History of the Popes (1623–1644)] (in German). Vol. 13/2. Freiburg: Herder. p. 999. OCLC 310455897.
- Pavlac, Brian A.; Lott, Elizabeth S. (2019). The Holy Roman Empire: A Historical Encyclopedia. Vol. 1. ABC-CLIO. p. 252. ISBN 978-1440848568.
- Psalm 58:10, King James Version.
- Rein, Nathan (2008). The Chancery of God – Protestant Print, Polemic and Propaganda against the Empire, Magdeburg 1546–1551. London: Routledge. p. 14. ISBN 9781315240800.
- Schiller, Friedrich (1792). Geschichte des dreyßigjährigen Kriegs [History of the Thirty Years' War] (in German). Frankfurt am Main; Leipzig: sine nomine. OCLC 833153355.
- Schwineköper, Berent (1957). "Christian Wilhelm" [New German Biography]. Neue Deutsche Biographie (in German). Vol. 3. Berlin: Duncker & Humblot. p. 226. (full text online).
- Tucker, Spencer C. (2021). Great Sieges in World History: From Ancient Times to the 21st Century. Denver: ABC-CLIO. p. 82. ISBN 978-1440868030.
- Wilson, Peter H. (2004). From Reich to Revolution: German history 1558–1806. European history in perspective series. London: Palgrave Macmillan. ISBN 9780333652442.
- Wilson, Peter H. (2011) [first publ. 2009]. Europe's Tragedy: A History of the Thirty Years War. Cambridge, MA: Harvard University Press. ISBN 9780674062313.
- Wolgast, Eike (1995). Hochstift und Reformation. Studien zur Geschichte der Reichskirche zwischen 1517 und 1648 [Bishopric and Reformation. Studies of the History of the Imperial Church between 1517 and 1648] (in German). Stuttgart.
