= Pappenheim-hilt rapier =

Type of rapier

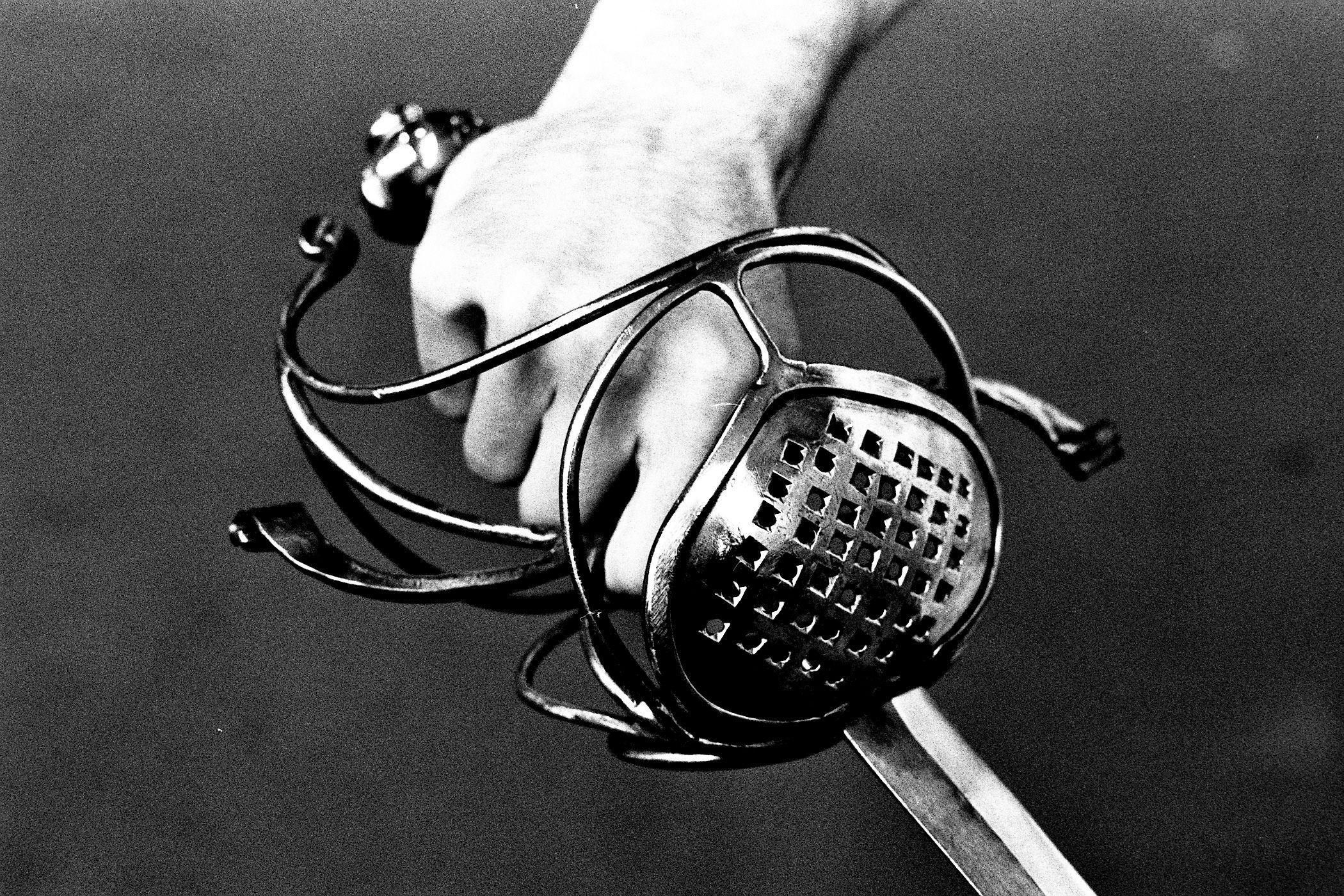

The Pappenheim-hilt rapier originated in Germany in 1630 and came to prominence through its use by Count Pappenheim, a general of the Holy Roman Empire during the Thirty Years' War (1618–48). It later became popular throughout Europe due to its two pierced shell guards which provided great protection to the soldier wielding the sword. Rapiers were used throughout Europe by 1500 and this remained until the late 17th century. Rapiers were used on battlefields, however they were associated more with fashion and duelling for example.
