= Gottfried Heinrich Graf zu Pappenheim =

Marshal of the Holy Roman Empire (1594–1632)

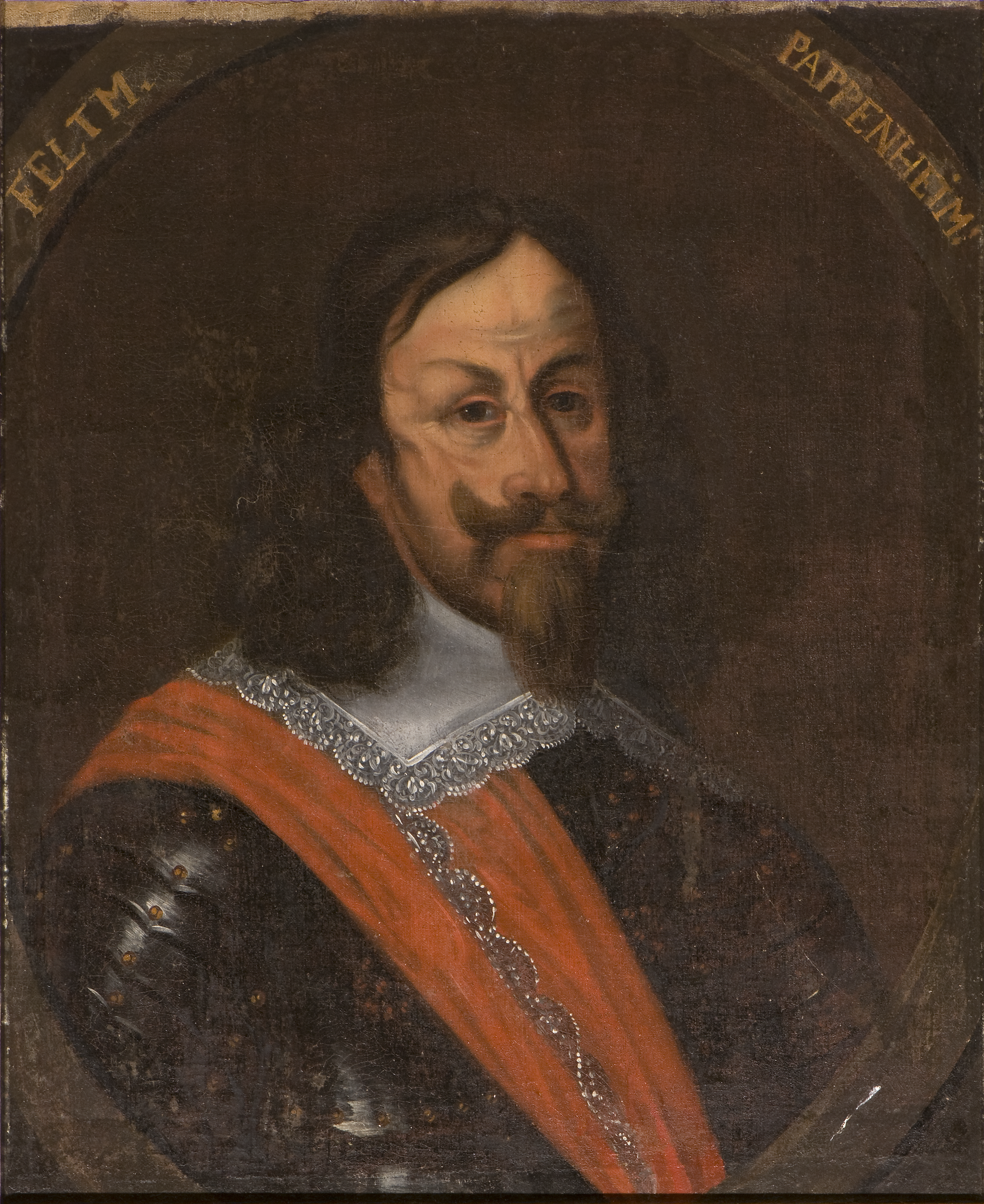
- Gottfried Heinrich Graf zu Pappenheim
- Born: 29 May 1594; Pappenheim on the Altmühl, Bavaria
- Died: 17 November 1632 (aged 38); Leipzig, Saxony
- Military career
- Allegiance: Holy Roman Empire; Electorate of Bavaria
- Service years: 1618–1632
- Rank: Generalfeldmarschall
- Conflicts: Thirty Years' War: Battle of the White Mountain (1620); Upper Austria peasant war; Sack of Magdeburg (1631); Battle of Breitenfeld (1631); Capture of Maastricht (1632); Battle of Lützen (1632) (DOW)

Gottfried Heinrich Graf zu Pappenheim (29 May 1594 – 17 November 1632) was a German field marshal of the Holy Roman Empire in the Thirty Years' War. A supporter of the Catholic League, he was mortally wounded during the Battle of Lützen fighting the Protestant forces under Swedish king Gustavus Adolphus.

== Biography ==
Pappenheim was born in the little town of Treuchtlingen, a secondary seat of his family, the ruling lords of Pappenheim on the Altmühl in Bavaria, a free lordship of the empire, from which the ancient family to which he belonged derived its name. He was the second son of Veit zu Pappenheim, Lord of Treuchtlingen and Schwindegg, and his second wife Maria Salome von Preysing-Kopfsburg. He was educated at Altdorf and Tübingen, and subsequently traveled in southern and central Europe, mastering the various languages, and seeking knightly adventures. His stay in these countries led him eventually to adopt the Roman Catholic faith in 1614, to which he devoted the rest of his life. At the outbreak of the great war, he abandoned the legal and diplomatic career on which he had embarked, and in his zeal for the faith took service in Poland. The experience gained serving in the Polish army (especially in the way of fighting cavalry) was to his advantage in fighting on the side of the Catholic League.

He soon became a lieutenant-colonel, and displayed great courage and ability at the battle of the White Mountain near Prague (8 November 1620), where he was left for dead on the field. In the following year, he fought against Ernst, Graf von Mansfeld in western Germany, and, in 1622, became colonel of a regiment of cuirassiers. In 1623, as an ardent friend of Spain, the ally of his sovereign and the champion of his faith, he raised troops for the Italian war and served with the Spaniards in Lombardy and the Grisons. It was his long and heroic defence of the post of Riva on the Lake Mezzola that first brought him conspicuously to the front. In 1626, Maximilian I of Bavaria, the head of the League, recalled him to Germany and entrusted him with the suppression of a peasant rebellion, which had broken out in Upper Austria. Pappenheim swiftly carried out his task, encountering a most desperate resistance, but always successful; and in a few weeks he had crushed the rebellion with ruthless severity (i.e. Gmunden, Vöcklabruck and Wolfsegg, 15–30 November 1626).

After this, he served with Tilly against Christian IV of Denmark, and besieged and took Wolfenbüttel. His hopes of obtaining the sovereignty and possessions of the evicted prince of Brunswick-Wolfenbüttel were, after a long intrigue, definitively disappointed. In 1628, he was made a count of the empire. The siege and storm of Magdeburg followed, and Pappenheim, like Tilly, has been accused of the most savage cruelty in this massacre. So much could not be said of his tactics at the battle of Breitenfeld, the loss of which was not a little due to the impetuous cavalry general, who was never so happy as when leading a great charge of horse. However, he covered the retreat of the imperialists from the lost field with care and skill, and subsequently won great glory by his operations on the lower Rhine and the Weser in the rear of the victorious army of Gustavus Adolphus. Much-needed reinforcements for the king of Sweden were constantly detained by Pappenheim's small and newly raised force in the northwest.

His operations were far-ranging and his restless activity dominated the country from Stade to Kassel, and from Hildesheim to Maastricht. Being now a field marshal in the imperial service, he was recalled to join Wallenstein, and assisted the generalissimo in Saxony against the Swedes; but, was again despatched towards Cologne and the lower Rhine. In his absence, a great battle became imminent, and Pappenheim was hurriedly recalled. He appeared with his horsemen in the midst of the battle of Lützen (16 November 1632, 6 November 1632 on Swedish reckoning). His furious attack was for the moment successful. As Rupert at Marston Moor sought Cromwell as his worthiest opponent, so now Pappenheim sought Gustavus. At about the same time as the king was killed, Pappenheim received a mortal wound in another part of the field. He died later the same day or early the next morning en route to Leipzig, where his body was embalmed at the Pleissenburg fortress.

== Legacy ==
- The form of rapier called the Pappenheimer, is reportedly named after him.
- In Polish military terminology, "pappenheimer" refers to a type of helmet worn by heavy cavalry during the Thirty Years' War.
- In German the phrase "I know my Pappenheimer" (Ich kenne meine Pappenheimer) referring to a person acting as expected in a negative sense. Originating from Schiller's Wallenstein plays, though there meant in positive way. In Dutch the expression retains its positive meaning, though it can also be used ironically.
- A drinking song honouring "General Pappenheimer" is sung by student associations around Europe.

== Gallery ==
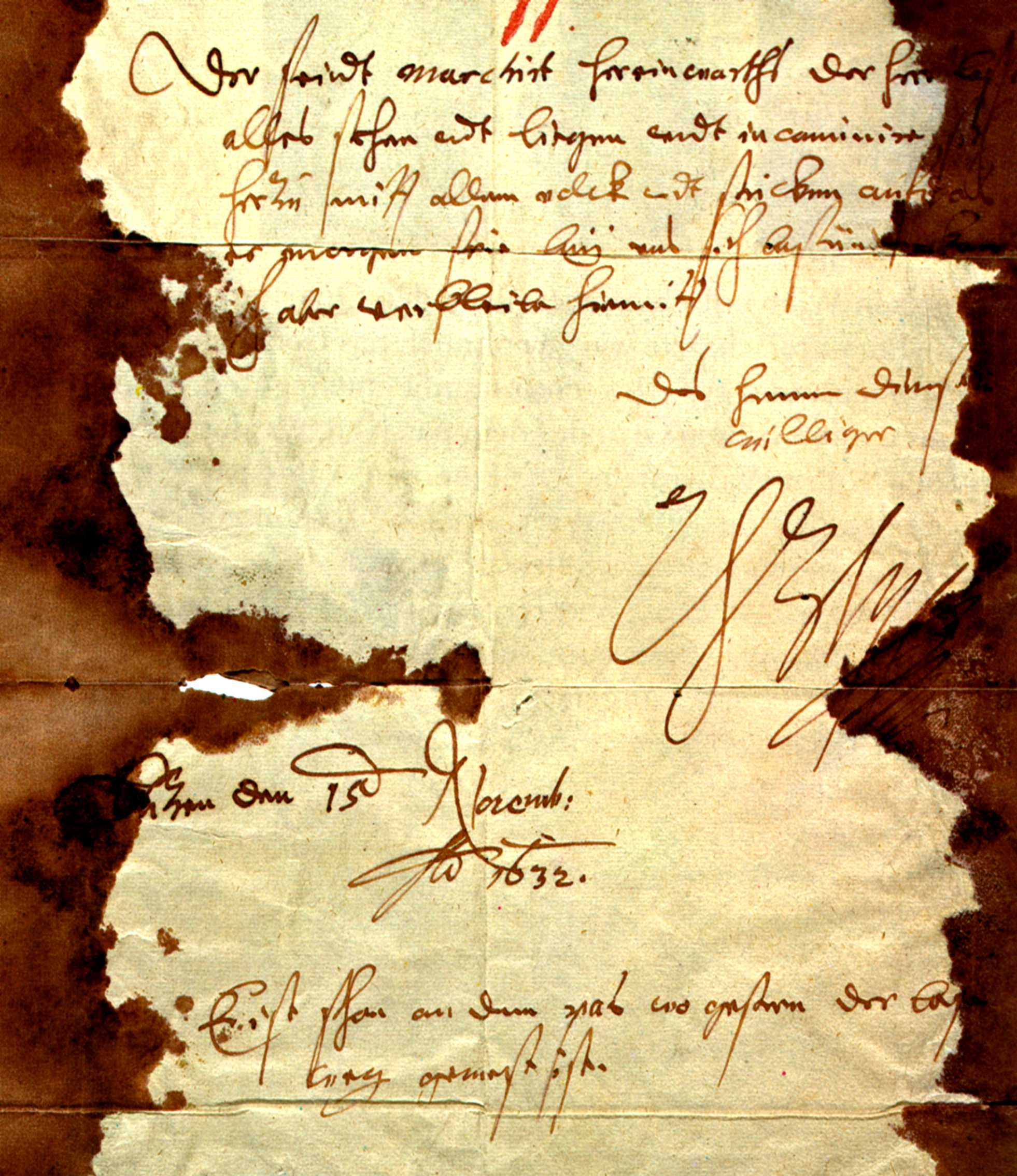
Letter from Wallenstein, containing Pappenheim's last orders as well as stains of his blood.
( German Wikisource has original text related to this article: Pappenheim's last order)

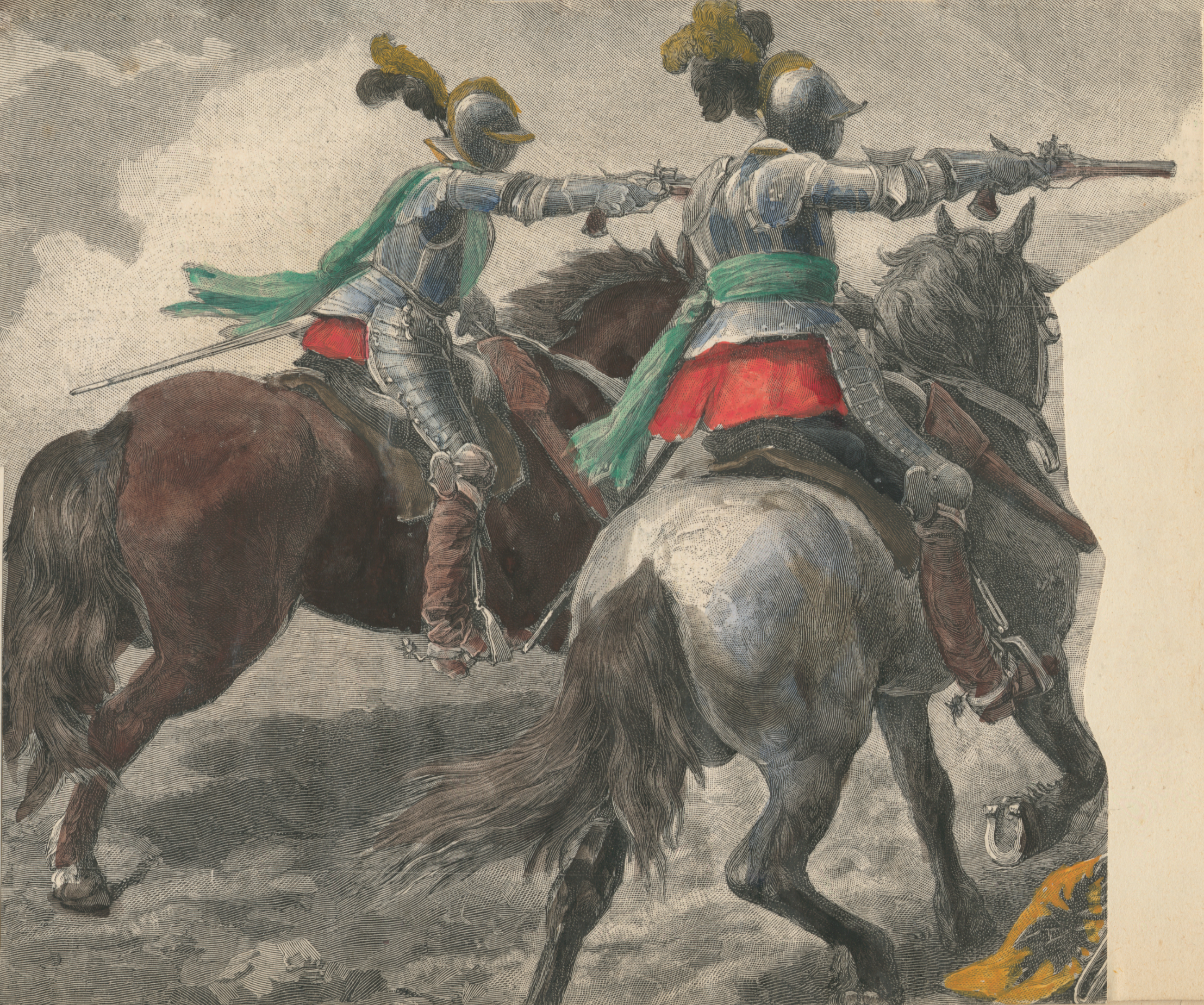
Cuirassiers of Gottfried Heinrich Graf zu Pappenheim

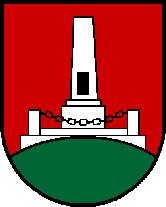
The Bauernhügel monument in Pinsdorf, Upper Austria, commemorates the peasant insurgents suppressed by Papenheim. It appears on the village's coat of arms

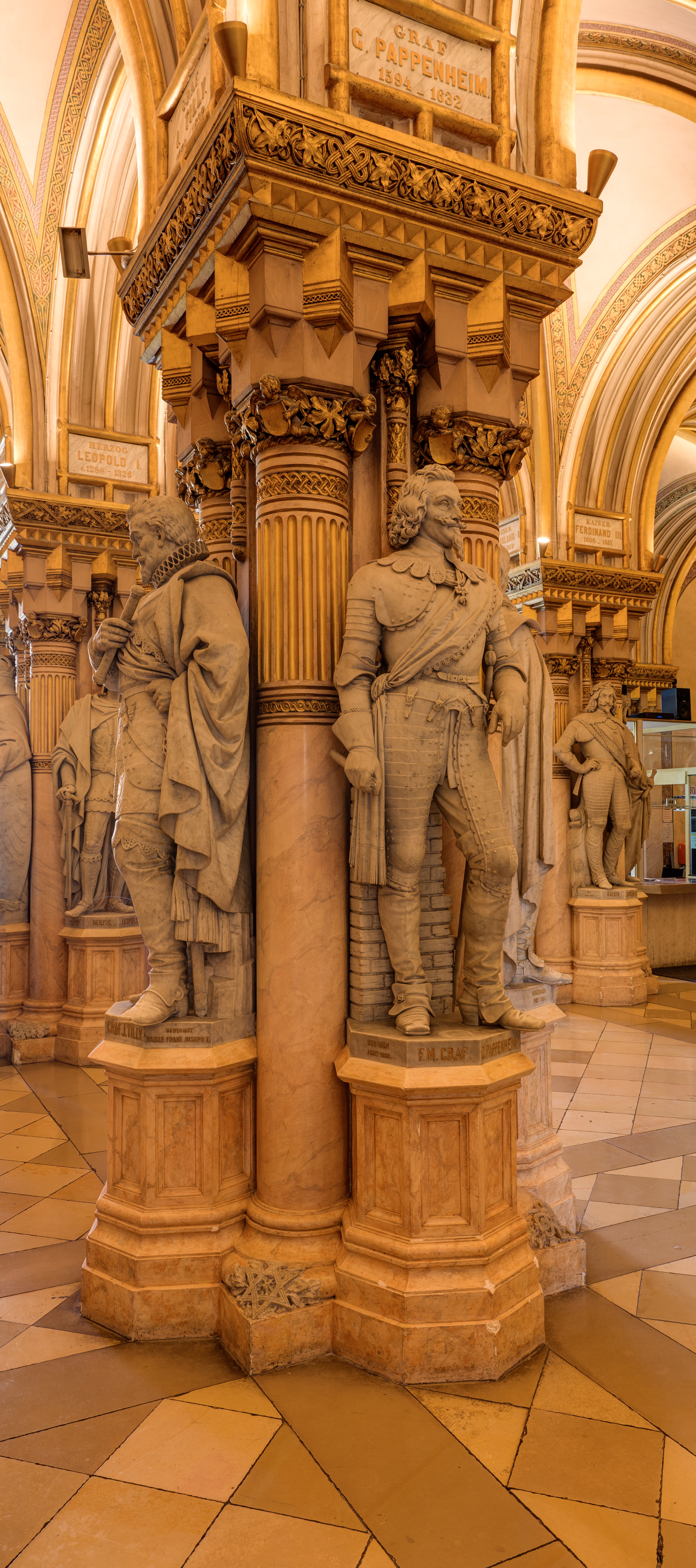
Statue in the hall of generals in the Museum of Military History, Vienna

== Sources ==
- Kriegsschriften von baierischen Officieren I. II. V. (Munich, 1820);
- Hess, Gottfried Heinrich Graf zu Pappenheim (Leipzig, 1855);
- Ersch and Grüber, Allgem. Encyklopädie, III. II (Leipzig, 1838);
- Wittich, in Allgem. deutsche Biographie, Band 25 (Leipzig, 1887), and works there quoted.
