= Bernard's Upper Rhine Campaign =

Part of the Thirty Years' War in 1638

- Part of the Thirty Years' War
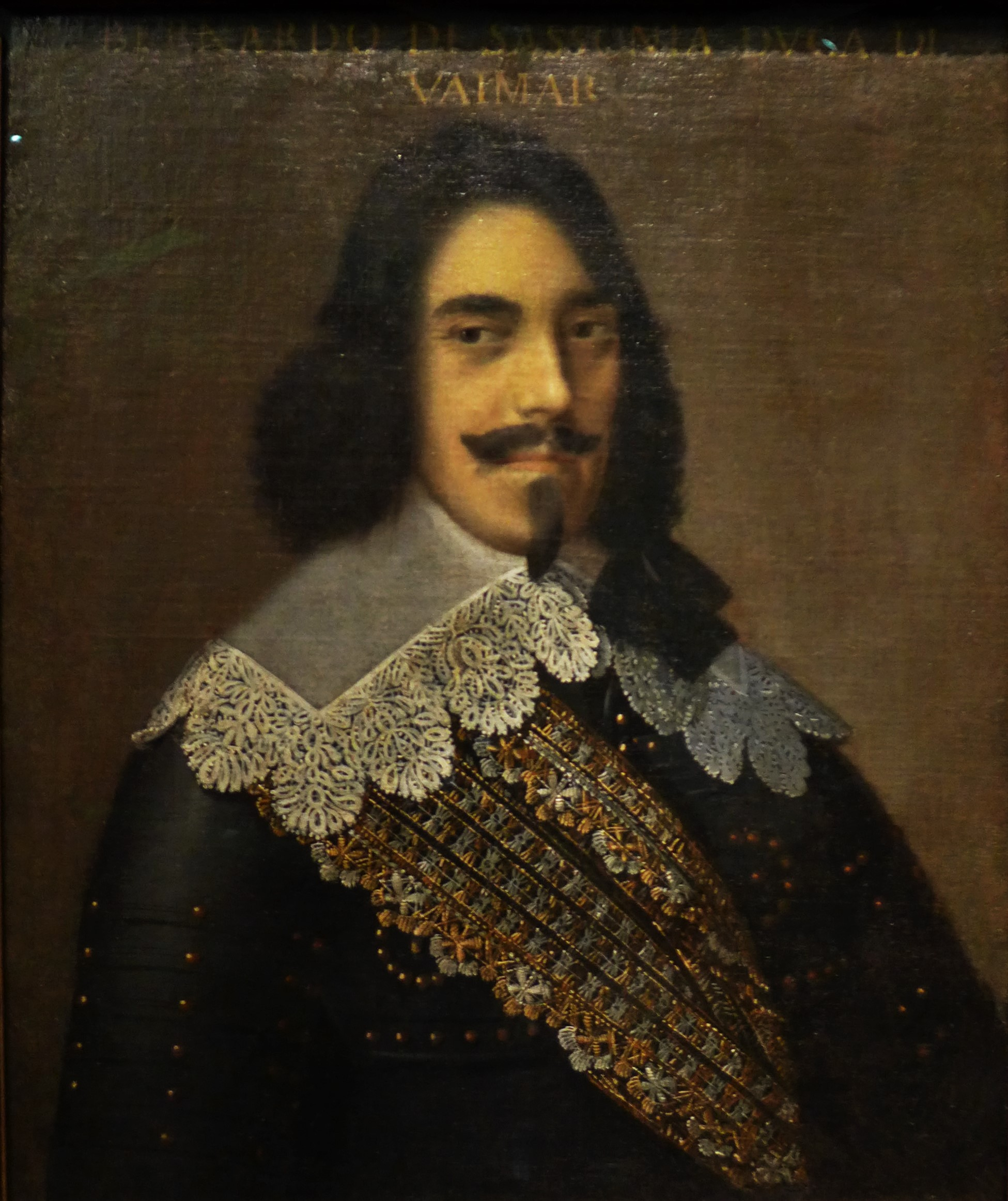
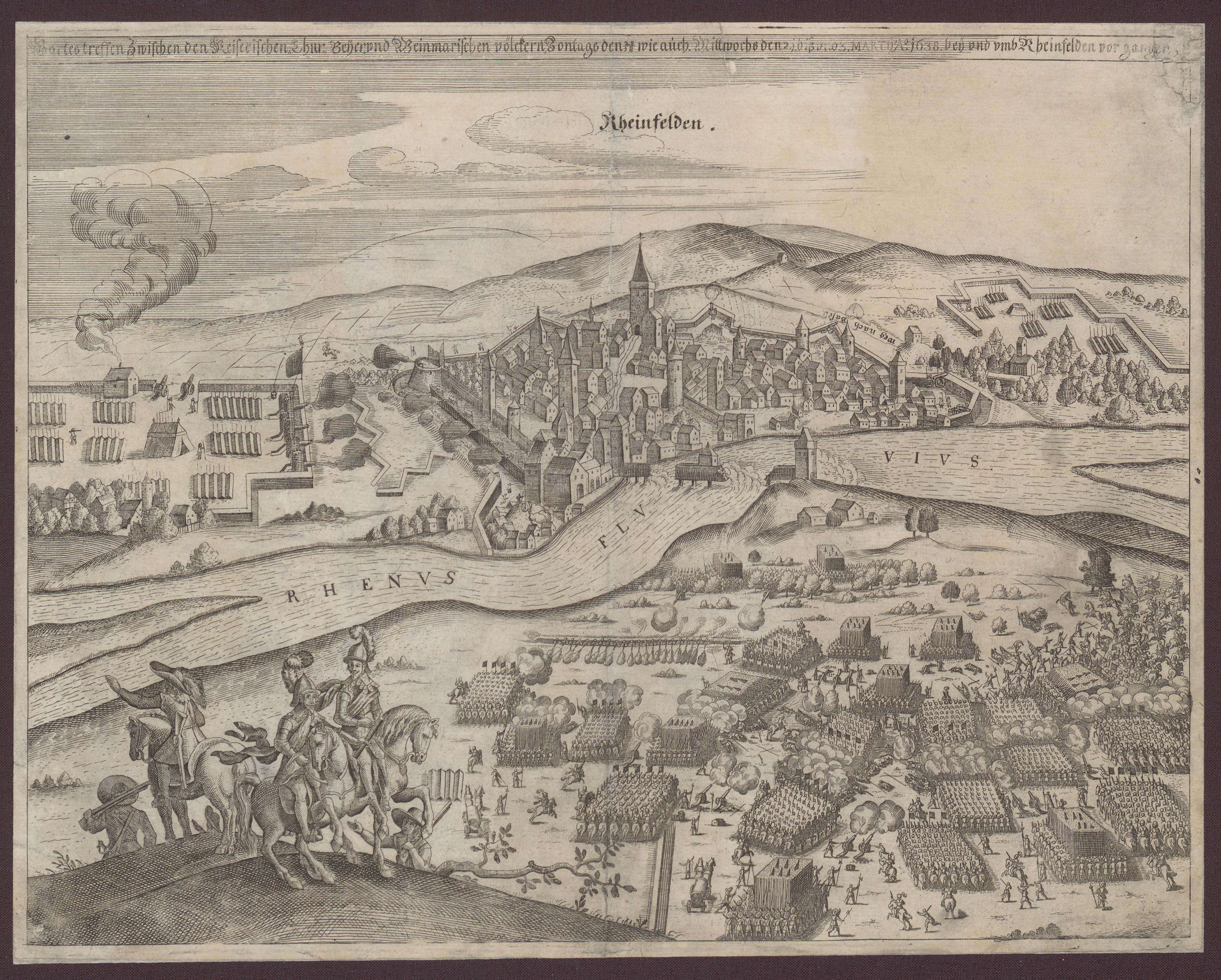
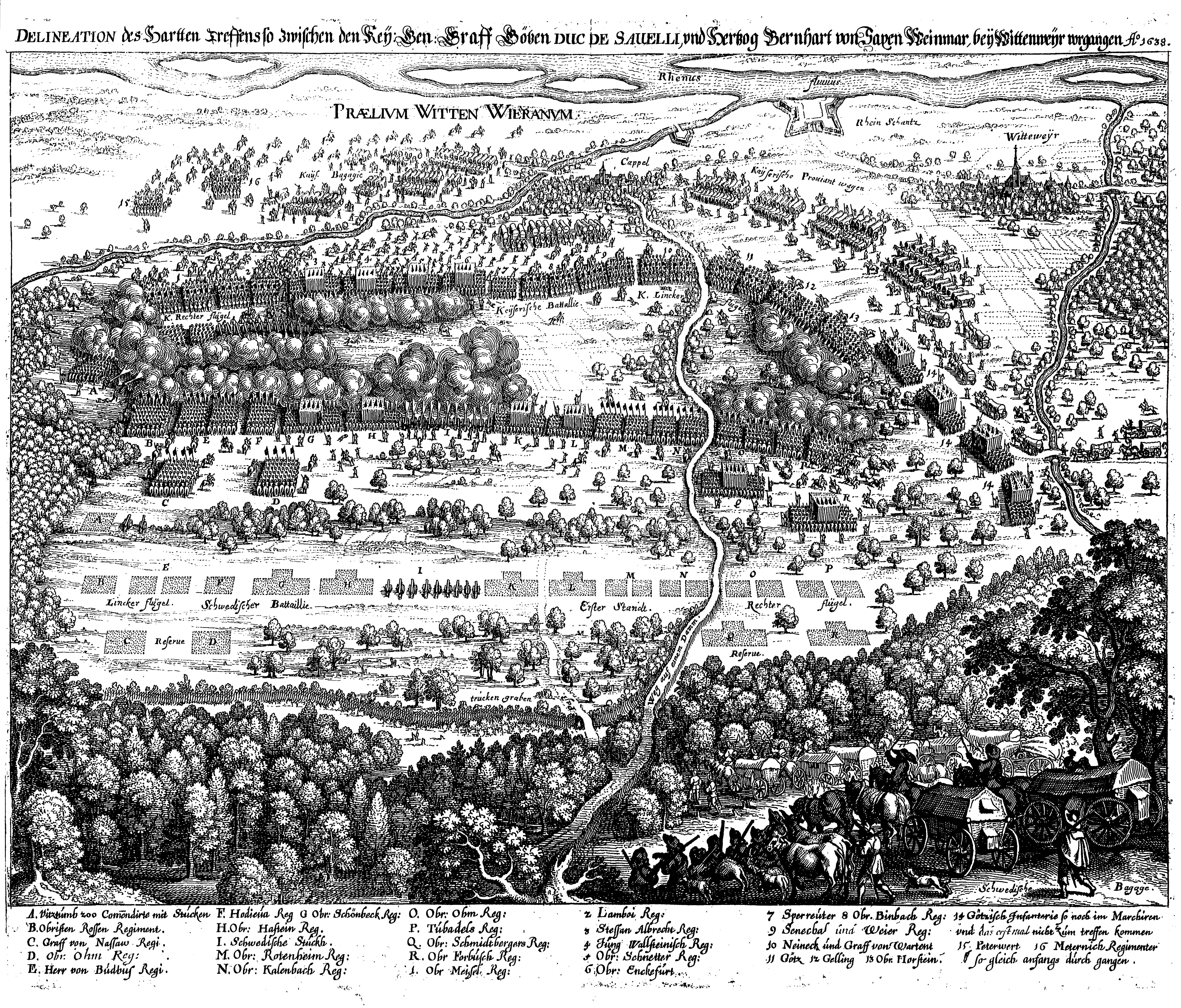
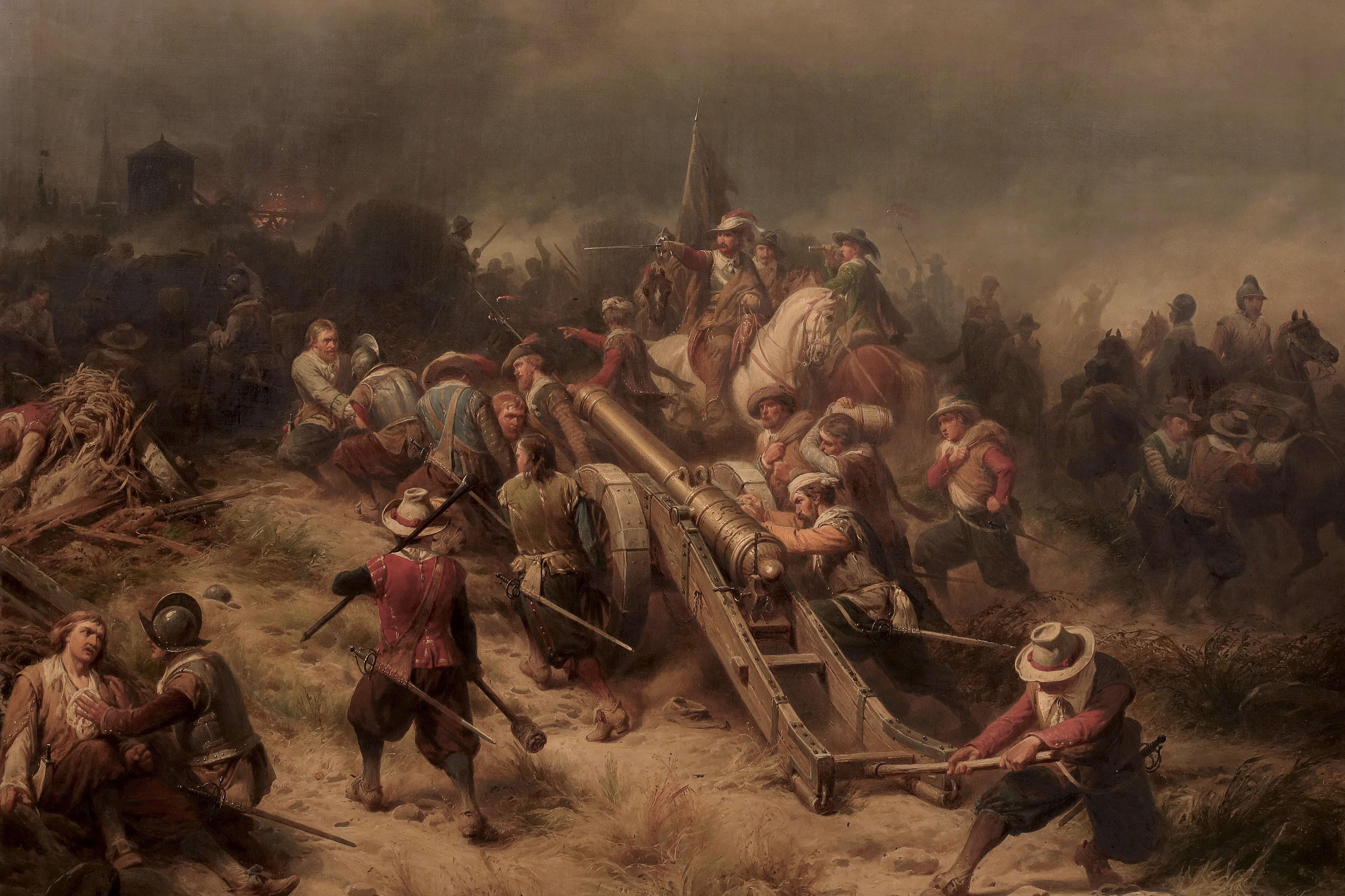
- Bernard of Saxe-Weimar The Battle of Rheinfelden The Battle of Wittenweiher The Siege of Breisach
Date	February–December 1638
Location	Swabia, Württemberg, Alsace
Result	Franco-Weimaran victory

Belligerents
France; Weimar Army (yes) Swedish Empire	Holy Roman Empire; Bavaria; Lorraine

Commanders and leaders
Bernhard of Saxe-Weimar; Friedrich Ludwig Kanoffski (Note: also known as Friedrich Ludwig Chanowsky von Langendorf); Georg von Taupadel; Reinhold von Rosen; Wilhelm Otto von Nassau-Siegen (WIA); Ludwig von Wietersheim †; Count of Wittgenstein (WIA); Johann Ludwig von Erlach; Sigismund von Erlach; Johann Bernard Ohm; Johann von Salm-Kyrburg (DOW) (Kingdom of France) Vicomte de Turenne (Kingdom of France) Jean-Baptiste de Guébriant (Kingdom of France) Henri de Rohan (Kingdom of France) François de L'Hospital (Swedish Empire) Arvid Forbus	(Holy Roman Empire) Federico Savelli (Note: Captured at Rheinfelden but later ecaped) (Holy Roman Empire) Hans von Reinach (surrendered) (Holy Roman Empire) Guillaume de Lamboy (Electorate of Bavaria) Johann von Werth (POW) (Electorate of Bavaria) Johann von Götz (Note: Also known as Johann von Götzen) (Electorate of Bavaria) Adrian von Enkevort (POW) (Electorate of Bavaria) Claus von Sperreuth (POW); Charles de Lorraine; Anne-François de Bassompierre (POW); Vernier (POW); Fleckenstein (POW)

Strength
5,000–6,000 men, 14 guns (Note: At Rheinfelden); 13,000 (Note: At Wittenweiher); 4,800 (Note: At Thann) c. 14,000–19,000 (Note: At Breisach)	4,000–7,000 men (Note: At Rheinfelden); 18,500 (Note: At Wittenweiher); 4,000 (Note: At Thann) c. 20,000 (Note: Relief of Breisach); 3,000 men and 152 Cannons (Note: Besieged force at Breisach)

Casualties and losses
5,400+ killed, wounded, and captured	2,400 – 6,400 killed 4,500+ – 8,500+ captured

Bernard's Upper Rhine Campaign was a successful military campaign by Bernard of Saxe-Weimar, who led an army hired by the Kingdom of France to fight against the Holy Roman Emperor Ferdinand III. The campaign was fought between February and December 1638, the four engagements of the campaign were the battles of Rheinfelden, Wittenweiher, Thann, and Breisach.

The campaign was initially fought for the forest towns in Baden-Württemberg, but then shifted to Breisach and Alsace. It was a decisive victory for the French and established their main base for their future German campaigns at Breisach, further consolidated French control over Alsace, and isolated the Spanish Franche-Comté from its Imperial Spanish allies.

Only months after the campaign, Bernard died of a fever, a complication of an ear infection. Bernard's death finally led to the incorporation of the Weimaran Army into the French Army of Germany. Many of the gains won in the campaign were lost following the Battle of Tuttlingen.

== Background ==
=== Thirty Years' War ===
The Thirty Years' War began in 1618 when the largely Protestant Bohemian Estates offered the Bohemian Crown to the Calvinist Frederick V, instead of the radical Catholic Ferdinand II of Habsburg. Most members of the Holy Roman Empire remained neutral, and the Bohemian Revolt was suppressed after two years of fighting. Financed by Maximilian of Bavaria, a Liga-Spanish Army launched an invasion of Frederick's German territory, and drove Frederick into exile in the Dutch Republic.

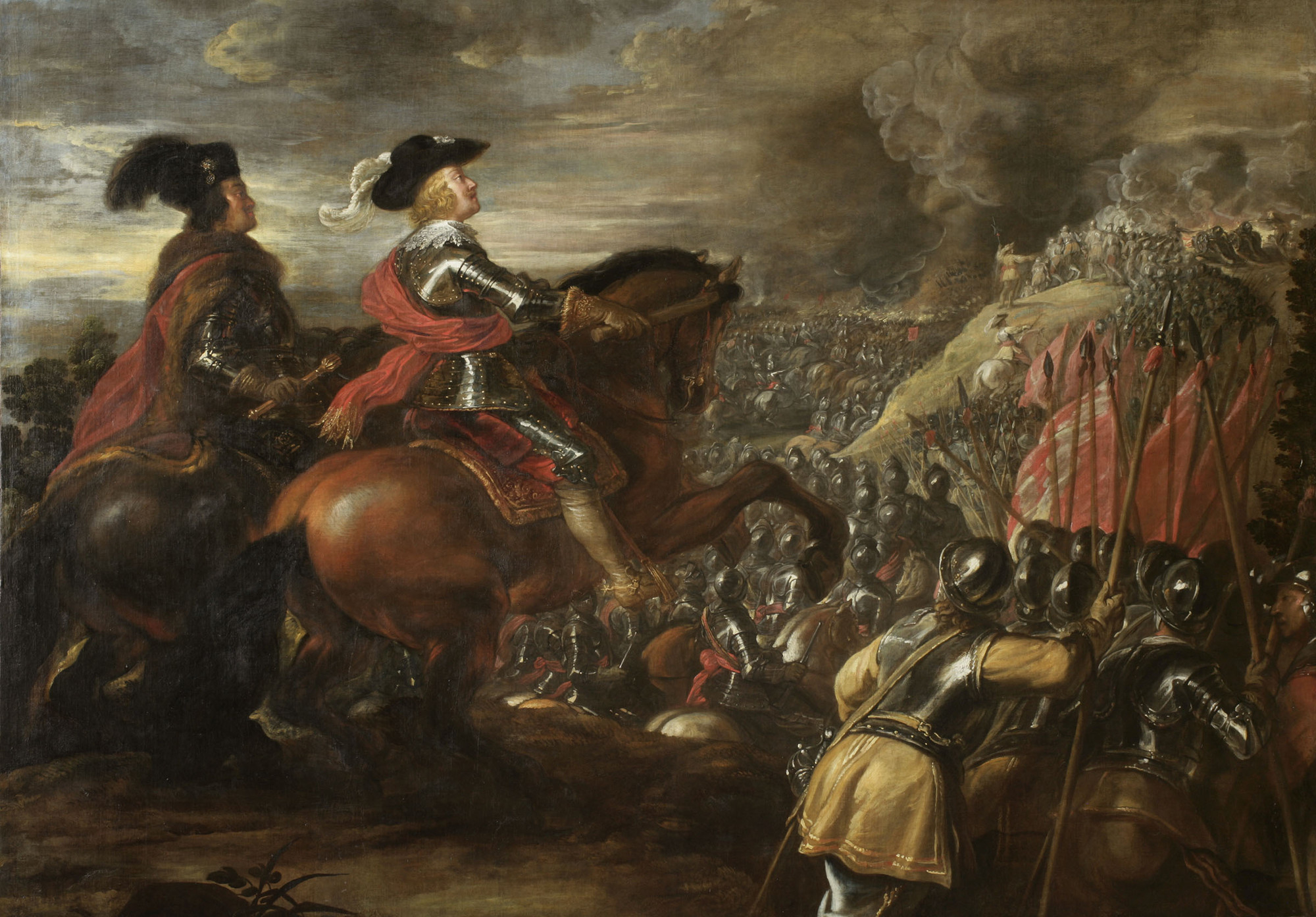
The Battle of Nördlingen

Frederick's replacement by Maximilian as ruler elector of the Palatinate changed the nature of the war, drawing in Protestant states like Saxony, Hesse-Kassel, Brandenburg-Prussia, and Denmark-Norway. In 1630, Gustavus Adolphus of Sweden invaded Pomerania, partly to support his fellow Protestants, but also to control the Baltic trade, which provided much of Sweden's income.

Despite the death of Gustavus at Lützen in November 1632, Sweden remained in the war. Their objectives conflicted with both Imperial states like Saxony, and their regional rivals, Denmark. In 1634 Bernard of Saxe-Weimar and Gustav Horn, Count of Pori were crushed by the Cardinal-Infante Ferdinand at the Batte of Nördlingen.

=== Bernard's Middle Rhine Campaign ===
The devastating defeat at Nördlingen left the Swedish Army in a deplorable state; he had lost 12,000–14,000 at the battle of out of 25,700 men. Bernard was powerless to stop Johann von Werth from sweeping West into Baden-Württemberg, which led him to abandon Heilbronn and retreat to Mainz. Only Hohentwiel and Ulm held out in Swabia; Bernard's situation grew worse when an Imperial Army under Philipp von Mansfeld moved south, and another army under Matthias Gallas moved north. With few options at hand, Bernard offered his service to the French, who agreed and promised him his own personal duchy in Alsace.

Bernard, with 12,000–16,000 men, linked up with Louis de La Valette, who had ten thousand. However, two-thirds of La Valette's Army deserted; Frankfurt am Main and Mannheim were taken by Jost Maximilian von Bronckhorst-Gronsfeld. The surrender of Mainz, made Bernard's situation even worse. He withdrew first to Alsace, then further through Basel and into Mömpelgard.

== Campaign ==
=== Imperial Order of Battle ===
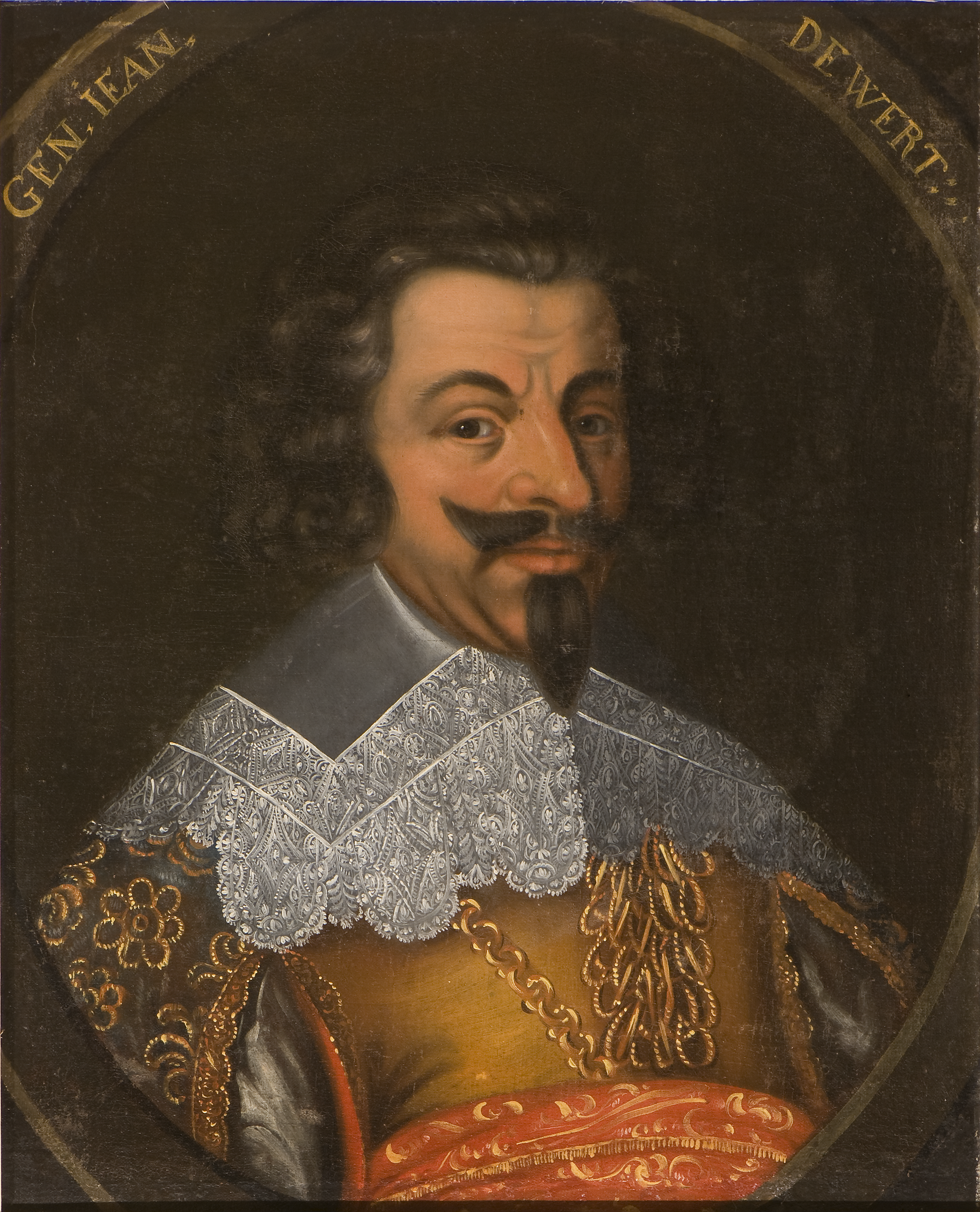
Johann von Werth

- Götz Infantry Regiment (Imperial)
- Eckhevoert Infantry Regiment (Imperial)
- Henderson Infantry Regiment (Imperial)
- Pappenheim Intantry Regiment (Bavarian)
- Wahl Infantry Regiment (Bavarian)
- Lamboy Cuirassier Regiment (Imperial)
- Gayling Cuirassier Regiment (Bavarian)
- Billeck Cuirassier Regiment (Bavarian)
- Werth Arquebusier Regiment (Bavarian)
- Valois Arquebusier Regiment (Bavarian)
- Horst Arquebusier Regiment (Bavarian)
- Neunegg Arquebusier (?) Regiment
- Metternich Arquebusier Regiment
- Unknown Dragoon Regiment
- Croatian Irregular Light Cavalry

(Note: This list way not be complete)

=== Rheinfelden ===
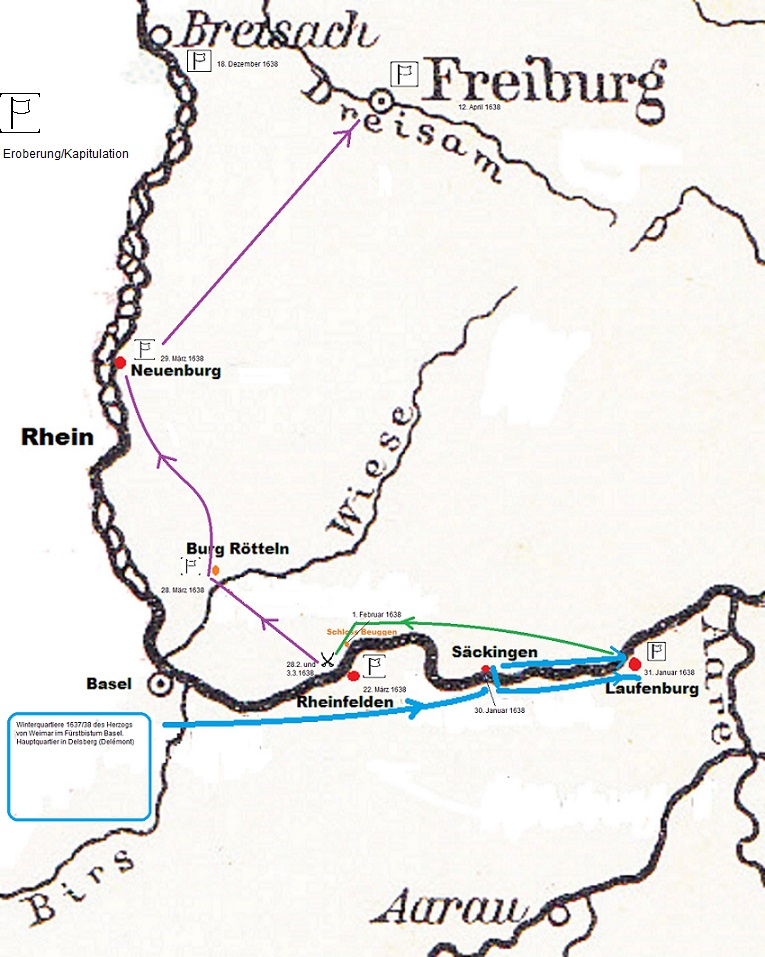
A map of Bernard's Rhine Campaign

In early February 1638, having been prodded by the French government, Bernhard advanced his army of 6,000 men and 14 guns to the Rhine. Arriving at an important crossing point at the town of Rheinfelden, Bernhard prepared to invest the town from the south. Meanwhile, he would use the ferry at Beuggen to throw troops across the river to complete the investment from the north. The attack on the town was to be made on the first of March. To prevent this, the Imperialists, under the Italian mercenary Count Federico Savelli and German general Johann von Werth, moved with 2,600 infantry and 4,500 cavalry through the Black Forest to attack Bernhard's army and relieve the town.

Rheinfelden held out stubbornly as Werth and Savelli moved closer. The Imperials reached early on Sunday, February the 28th, outside of Beuggen, but were blocked by some of Bernard's dragoons. The Imperials were unable to deploy; instead, they took another more difficult road parallel to the river and headed west to Rheinfelden. Bernard used the four hours it took for them to ferry over 600 musketeers and 8 light guns, as well as concentrating the cavalry already north of the river under Georg Christoph von Taupadel on the higher ground above the town. Taupadel charged as the Bavarian cavalry tried to deploy from the road at Karsau.

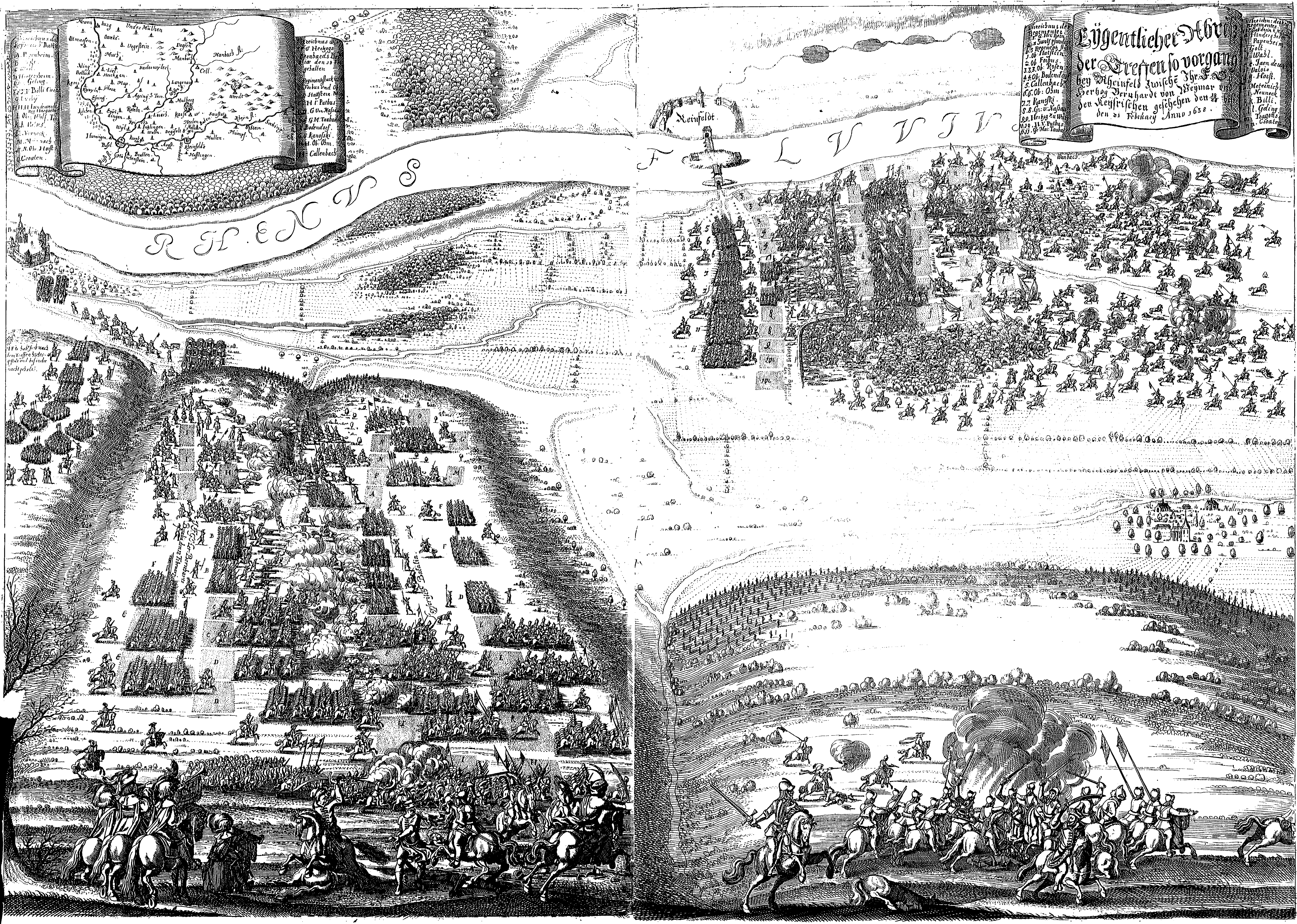
Battle of Rheinfelden

The Bavarians where through back, but left Rohan and Johann Phillip von Salm-Kyrburg, another Palatine veteran, Salm was mortally wounded, while Johann Ludwig von Erlach and Rohan were captured. Savelli and the Imperial Infantry now arrived and gained the heights. Bernard held his position until night, then slipped past the enemy to retreat eastwards along the river to Säckingen, abandoning at least three of his guns and 150 men.

The absence of pursuit is unsurprising given Savelli and Werth had just force-marched their men through the mountains in winter on low rations. Bernard regrouped at Lauffenburg, 14 kilometres upstream, where he was joined by the rest of his army from the south bank of the river on March 2. He now undertook one of the risky maneuvers that made him famous, setting off early the next day back along the north bank to Beuggen, collecting 3 artillery pieces that Werth and Savelli had failed to find. Bernard was spotted by Imperial pickets around 7 am.

Werth and Savelli hastily deployed behind a ditch that had drained into the Rhine, but before he could get his troops together, they were killed. The Berhardine infantry advanced in good order, firing a salvo at half range, supported by their artillery. The cavalry on the flanks then charged; the Imperial infantry replied with a salvo but then fled as the Bernhardinists moved across the ditch. Werth attempted to stand with the rest of the Bavarians, until they were forced to surrender. 500 Imperial-Bavarians were killed while 3,000 were captured including Savelli, Werth, Adrian von Enkevort, and Claus Dietrich von Sperreuth. Savelli managed to escape his captivity after the battle. Werth and Enkevort were exchanged for Swedish Generals in 1641 and 1642 respectively, and Sperreuter was held hostage in Hohentwiel until being exchanged for Taupadel.

=== Aftermath of Rheinfelden and Beginning of the siege of Breisach ===
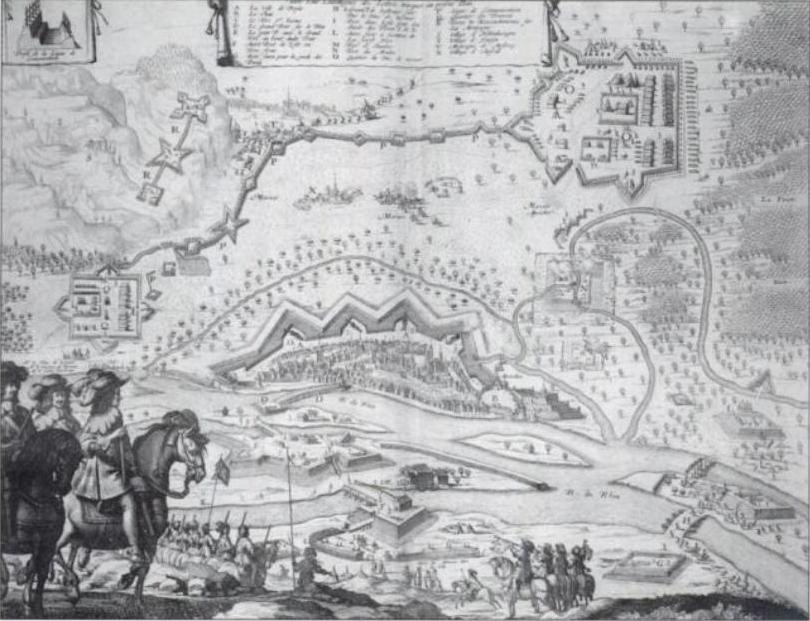
A depiction of the siege

The loss of some highly experienced officers crippled the Bavarian Army. Johann von Götz was diverted from his offensive against Hesse-Kassel and moved south to the Upper Rhine. Rheinfelden held out for three weeks, even after pressing the prisoners into his service he still only numbered 12,000, he received 4,500 volunteers under Vicomte de Turenne, Jean-Baptiste Budes Comté de Guébriant, and François de L'Hôpital.

Rather than pushing along the Forest Town route, Bernard turned against Breisach, Freiburg being abandoned because it was too hard to defend on April 10. Bernard concentrated his artillery and infantry outside Breisach, leaving Taupadel and the cavalry east of the Black Forest to deter a relief force. Hans Heinrich IX, Baron of Reinach, the competent and skilled commander of the garrison, had received reinforcements of 3,000 men and 152 artillery pieces. Johann von Götz was given command of the relief force, and collected 13,500 men at Rottweil east of the Black Forest. He intended to coordinate a relief effort with Charles de Lorraine, who still held out with 5,000 men in the Franche-Comté against Henri d'Orléans-Longueville and his 13,000-strong French Army.

Götz climbed the mountains to reach north of Breisach on June 26. He slipped in supplies but was too weak to attempt a relief directly and crossed over into Alsace hoping that taking French positions there would force Bernard to lift his siege. The French garrisons proved too strong, however, and Bernard now switched Taupadel's force west of the Rhine to counter Götz. Thwarted, Götz withdrew to Württemberg, leaving Savelli opposite Strasbourg. Having recuperated, Götz rejoined Savelli to give a combined army of 15,000 at Offenburg on August 7.

=== Imperial-Bavarian Army ===
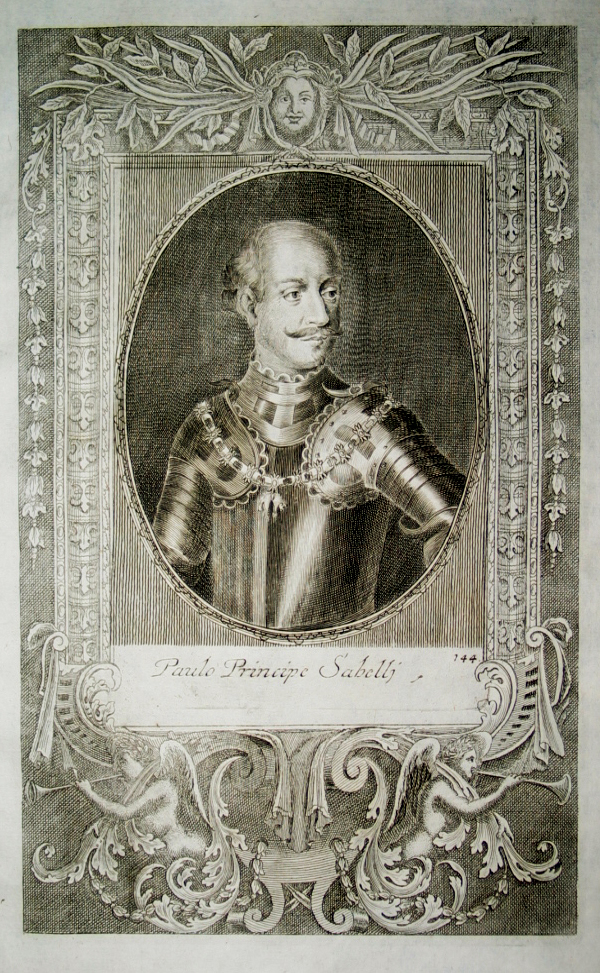
Federico Savelli

Main Body: (about 2,900 horse and 1,900 foot),

Savelli (Imperial) Infantry Regiment, Zweyer (Imperial) Infantry Regiment, Waldstein (Imperial) Infantry Regiment Caretto (Imperial) Infantry Regiment, Bonneval (Imperial) Infantry Regiment, Enckhevoert (Imperial) Infantry Regiment (remnants), Henderson (Imperial) Infantry Regiment (remnants), Gallas (Imperial) Infantry Regiment, Suys (Imperial) Infantry Regiment, Det/Mercy (Imperial) Infantry Regiment Stephan Albrecht (Bavarian) Infantry Regiment, des Pours (Bavarian) Infantry Regiment, Combined Schetter & Torelli (Bavarian) Infantry Regiment, Lamboy (Imperial) Cuirassier Regiment, Metternich (Imperial) Cuirassier Regiment Draghi (Imperial) Cuirassier Regiment, Weiher (Imperial) Cuirassier Regiment, Senschal (Imperial) Cuirassier Regiment, Sperreuth (Imperial) Cuirassier Regiment Nicola (Imperial) Cuirassier Regiment Vernier (Imperial) Cuirassier Regiment, Gonzaga (Imperial) Cuirassier Regiment, Gallag (Imperial) Dragon Regiment, Nemarch & Corpes Combined Croatian Light Cavalry Regiment Meissel (Bavarian) Cuirassier Regiment, Limbach (Bavarian) Cuirassier Regiment, Neunnegg Cuirassier Regiment, Metternich Leibguardia Company attached, Württemberg Cuirassier Regiment, Neu-Werth Cuirassier. Regiment

Rearguard: (2,900 foot & 1,700 horse),

Gotz (Bavarian) Infantry Regiment, Hasslang (Bavarian) Infantry Regiment, Combined Metternich/Demont (Bavarian) Infantry Regiment, Combined Edelsteten & Vehlen (Bavarian) Infantry Regiment, M. Reinach (Bavarian) Infantry Regiment, Graf Göltz (Bavarian) Cuirassier Regiment, Horst (Bavarian) Cuirassier Regiment, Kolb (Bavarian) Cuirassier Regiment, Gayling (Bavarian) Cuirassier Regiment, Alt-Werth Cuirassier Regiment, Pürtmüller Cuirassier Regiment, Combined (Bavarian) Cuirassier Company, Redotti Cuirassier Regiment, Venlen Cuirassier Regiment, Haxthausen Cuirassier Regiment. (Note: this list way not be complete and is made by Ike Skeleton Combined Arms Research Library Digital Library)

=== Wittenweiher ===
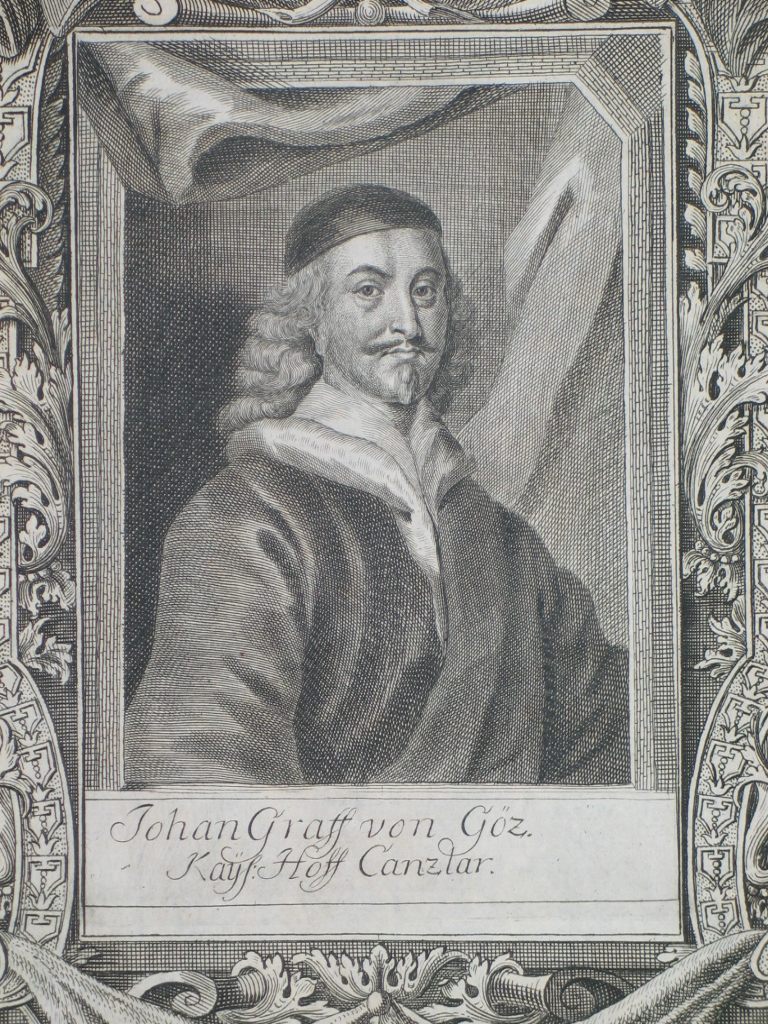
Johann von Götz

Götz attempted to send provisions to Breisach by using his entire army to escort supplies that were to be loaded onto barges at Rheinau. When Bernard realized he could never take Breisach while Götz remained in the field, he decided to force a battle. He drew 11,400 men from his siege lines and headed north through Kensingen and Lahr. It was not until scouts reported his approach on Sunday, August 8, that the imperial commanders realized Bernard was no longer at Breisach. The imperial cavalry in the vanguard were driven back into the village of Friesenheim, about 4km north of Lahr. Götz reacted quickly, placing infantry and artillery on a vine-covered hill at Schuttern, 2km west, while the rest of the army drew up behind a ditch between there and Friesenheim.

Bernard sent his French infantry to clear Friesenheim. The village was captured through fire set by the Imperials to the village. Götz regrouped his troops on the hill, while Bernard moved his artillery into the vineyard opposite the hill. Bernard soon realized that the terrain was unsuitable for cavalry, which comprised about half of his troops, and so broke the action, falling back to the more favorable ground at Mahlberg having lost about 50 to Götz's 120. Götz, determined to get the supply convoy through, gave Savelli 2/3rd of the army and sent him early the next day towards Wittenweiher to reach Rheinau.

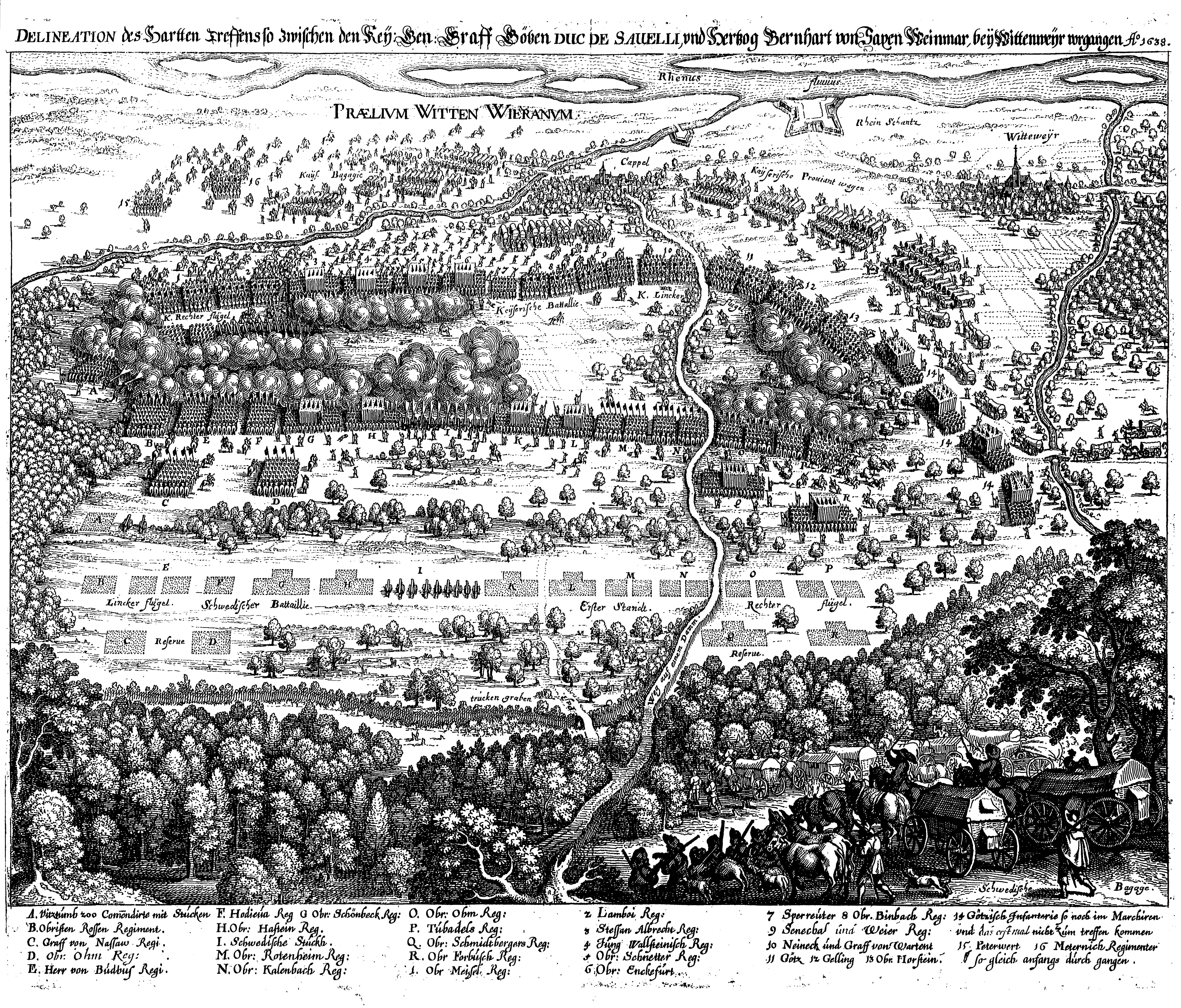
Battle of Wittenweiher

Götz hoped the large Kaiserwald wood would screen this move, but Bernard was alerted and headed north-west after the morning prayers to catch Savelli off guard as he emerged from a gap in the trees. Savelli had failed to take precautions and had moved too far ahead of the supply train that blocked the road behind. Bernard and Guébriant arrived at the gap first. Savelli's cavalry was disordered by 400 musketeers and 2 cannons Bernard had posted in the wood by the Rhine. They gave way as Bernard charged, some units of the imperials fleeing, discovering their infantry and plundering the supply train.

Savelli and the fugitives escaped through the chaos as Götz arrived with the rearguard. However, Taupadel's cavalry on the right faced better regiments and were thrown back by Götz who attacked Bernard's infantry and captured their artillery. Bernard replied to the threat by using cannons abandoned by Savelli, while two veteran's infantry regiments arrived from the reserve. Götz launched repeated attacks but would withdraw to Offenburg. Götz and Savelli lost 2,000 men, with 1,700 being captured, 13 cannons, 3,000 wounded, and 3,000 wagons full of food, while Bernard lost 1,000, furthermore Taupadel was captured but was later exchanged.

=== Thann and the Siege of Breisach ===
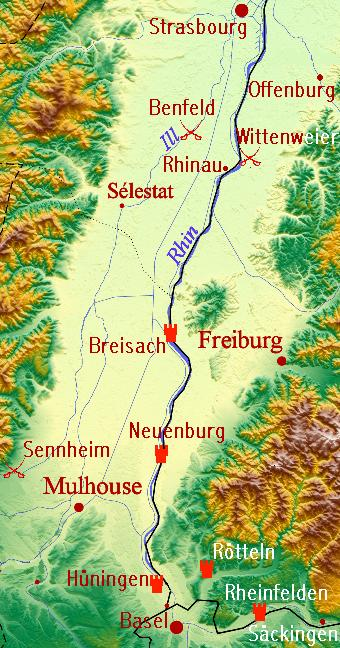
The Breisach Campaign

Though Götz was wounded he still persisted, he regrouped at Rottweil to wait for Guillaume de Lamboy, Baron of Cortesheim and his force of 3,900 men. They were originally intended to reinforce Spanish Italy but were diverted to join Götz directly, who was further reinforced by troops for Franconia and Bohemia. An unsuccessful attempt to supply food to Breisach through the Black Forest was beaten back, but Savelli, now posted at Philippsburg, did slip some food across the Rhine by sending Croats down the West Bank to Breisach.

Bernard was now down to 9,000 soldiers and could no longer isolate the fortress completely. Some peasants were able to slip into the city and sold food at a heavily inflated rate. The situation in Breisach was nonetheless desperate; Rheinach had already expelled the citizens of Breisach and was now down to 1,600 effective men. Bernard tried to sow dissent within Breisach by sending captured letters into the city.

Duke Charles would make his own attempt to relieve Breisach with his exiled army. He moved north from the Franche-Comté with 4,000 men into Alsace.

When the advancing army under Charles of Lorraine, numbering 4,000 men and its accompanying supply train with numerous supply wagons, entered the town of Thann, news of the army's arrival soon reached Colonel Reinhold von Rosen, who, as commander of a Weimar branch of the army, was conducting the siege of the fortress of Château de Landskron, about 50 km from Thann. With a request for reinforcements, General Rosen immediately sent the news of the army's arrival to Commander-in-Chief Bernhard von Weimar in Colmar. Although he was ill with fever, Bernard immediately moved from Colmar to La Croix-aux-Mines, about 70 km south, where reserve troops were stationed under the command of William Otto of Nassau-Siegen.

With these troops and several hundred musketeers, reinforced by French troops and eight regimental guns, the two generals moved north again to Ensisheim, about 60 km away, 20 km east of the town of Thann, where the Lorraine relief army and its supply train, had initially been reported, but then moved on.

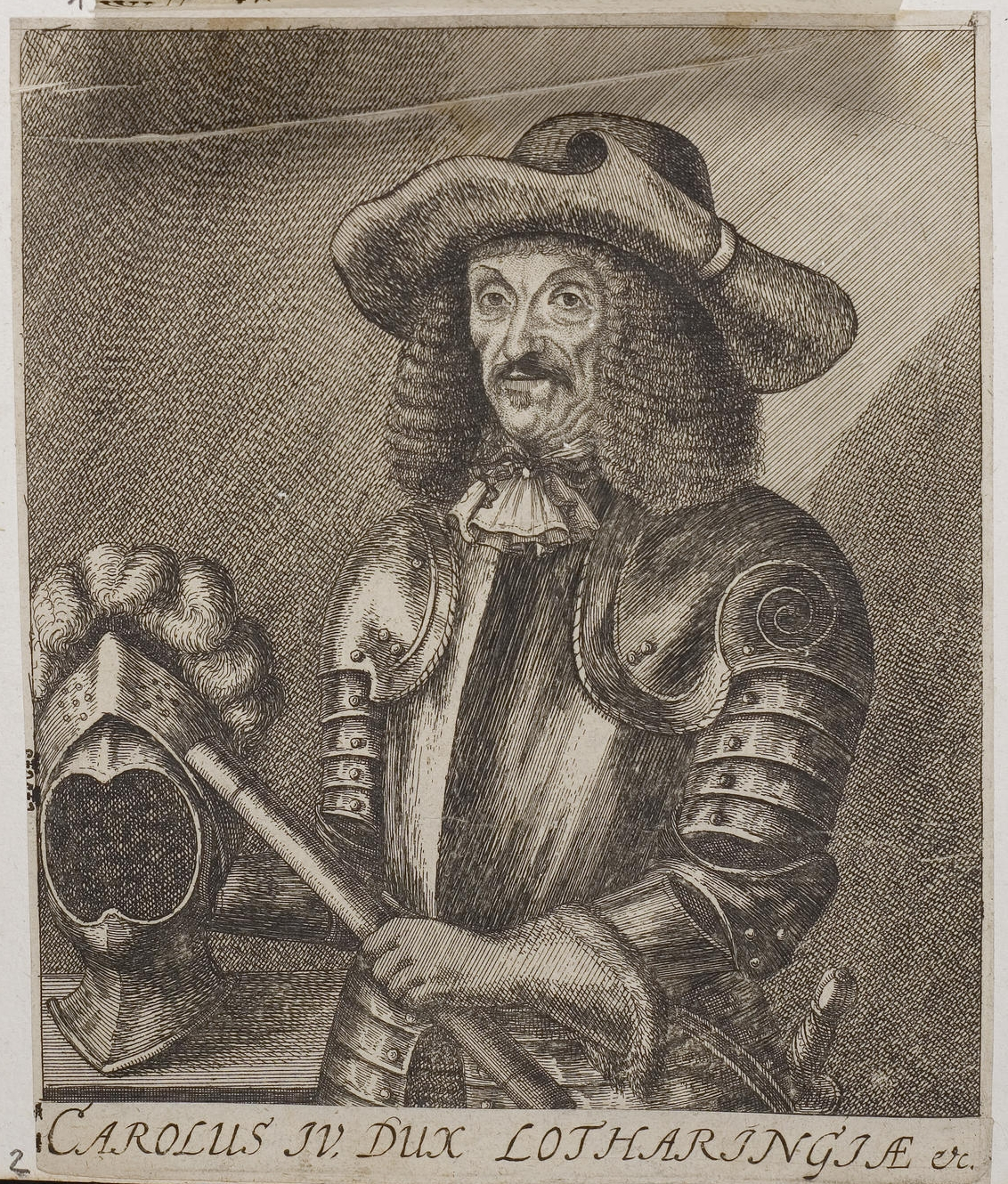
Charles Duke of Lorraine and Bar

Since a reconnaissance party sent by Bernard got lost while searching for the enemy army, his troops were initially to seek a waiting position in a forest. When the Lorraine relief army under Duke Charles and its supply train were discovered on October 15, 1638, on the Ochsenfeld between the towns of Thann and Cernay, the two armies unexpectedly clashed. The left wing of Charles's troops was fiercely attacked by Bernard's cavalry and threatened to be completely dispersed if the Lorraine right wing had not simultaneously successfully defeated Bernard's left wing and even captured its artillery. Only through his personal efforts was Bernard able to regroup the troops of the left wing and lead them into a counterattack.

The counterattack was so successful that the Weimar troops not only recaptured their own artillery but also captured the Lorraine artillery. The Lorraine cavalry and Duke Charles himself then turned to flight. The infantry managed to hold out for another two hours, but after the explosion of two powder wagons, they also turned to flight. Duke Charles, who had lost his horse, narrowly escaped on foot to Thann. The Duke of Weimar's booty included all the artillery, baggage, 44 colors, and, above all, all the grain intended for Breisach. In addition, there were numerous captured officers and soldiers. Bernards's cavalry showed superior discipline, returning to the field having broken Charles's cavalry and assisted their infantry in crushing Charles's infantry, who fought for two hours before breaking and retreating back.

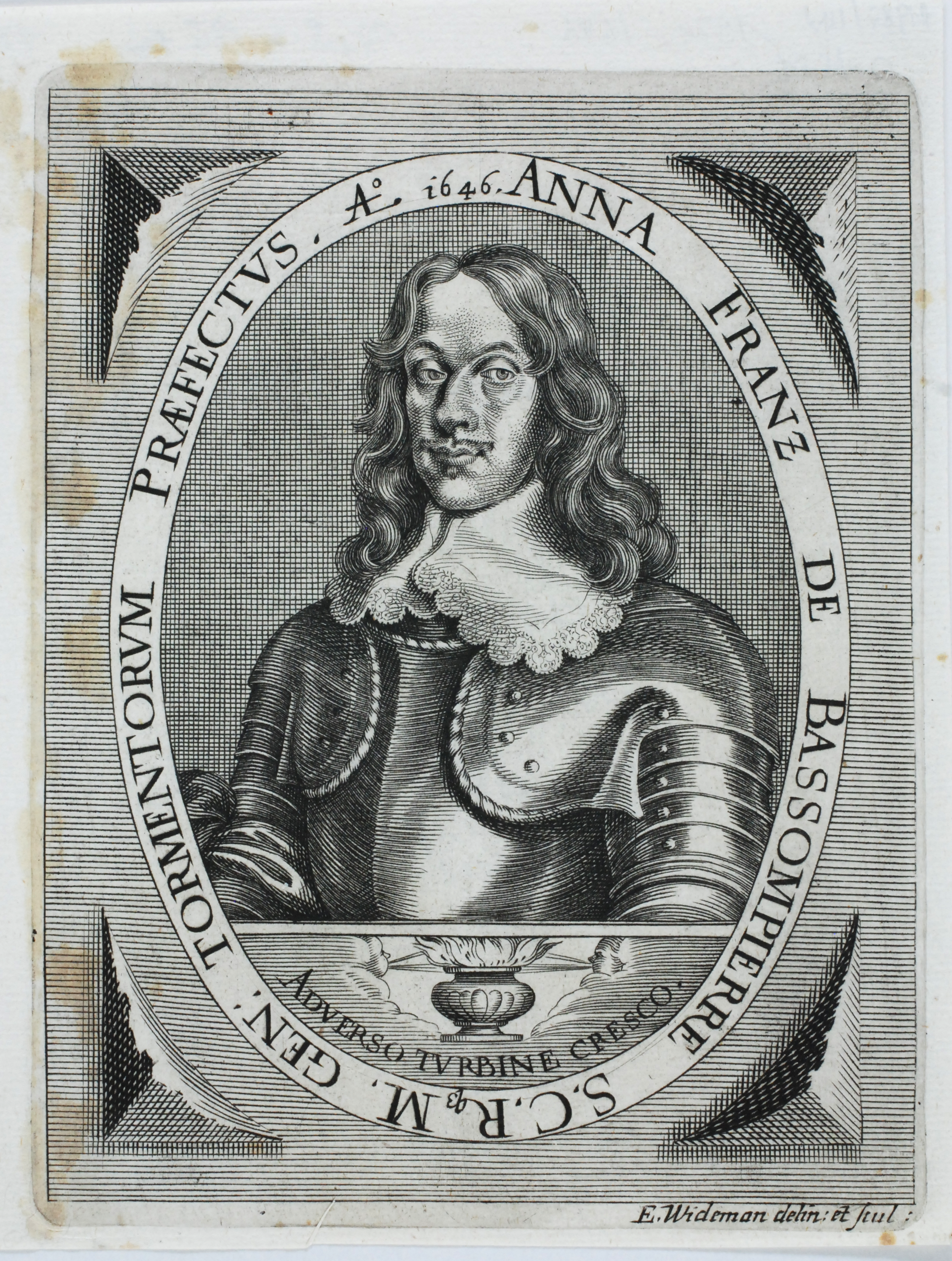
Anne-François de Bassompierre, one of the captured Lorraine Generals at Thann

In addition, there were numerous captured officers and soldiers. On the Lorraine side, Field Marshal Anne-François de Bassompierre (Note: a cousin of the Duke of Lorraine), Colonel Vernier, and Lieutenant Colonel Fleckenstein were taken prisoner. The Weimar troops lost Colonel Ludwig von Wietersheim; the Count of Nassau and the Count of Wittgenstein were wounded.

Götz then marched with 10,000 men atop the Glotter Valley past Freiburg, to reach Breisach on October 22, only to find Bernard was safely back in his entrenchments. Having been repulsed, Götz sent 1,000 musketeers over the Rhine to clear the besiegers from the Alsatian side of the Rhine, but were driven back by Turenne. Götz recrossed the Black Forest, with his army in poor shape, he relied on peasant militia to attack the Forest Towns in a desperate attempt to relieve Breisach. To support Götz, Charles of Lorraine advanced to Thann and Savelli attacked from Philippsburg, but all of the attacks were too weak to achieve something.

=== Fall of Breisach ===
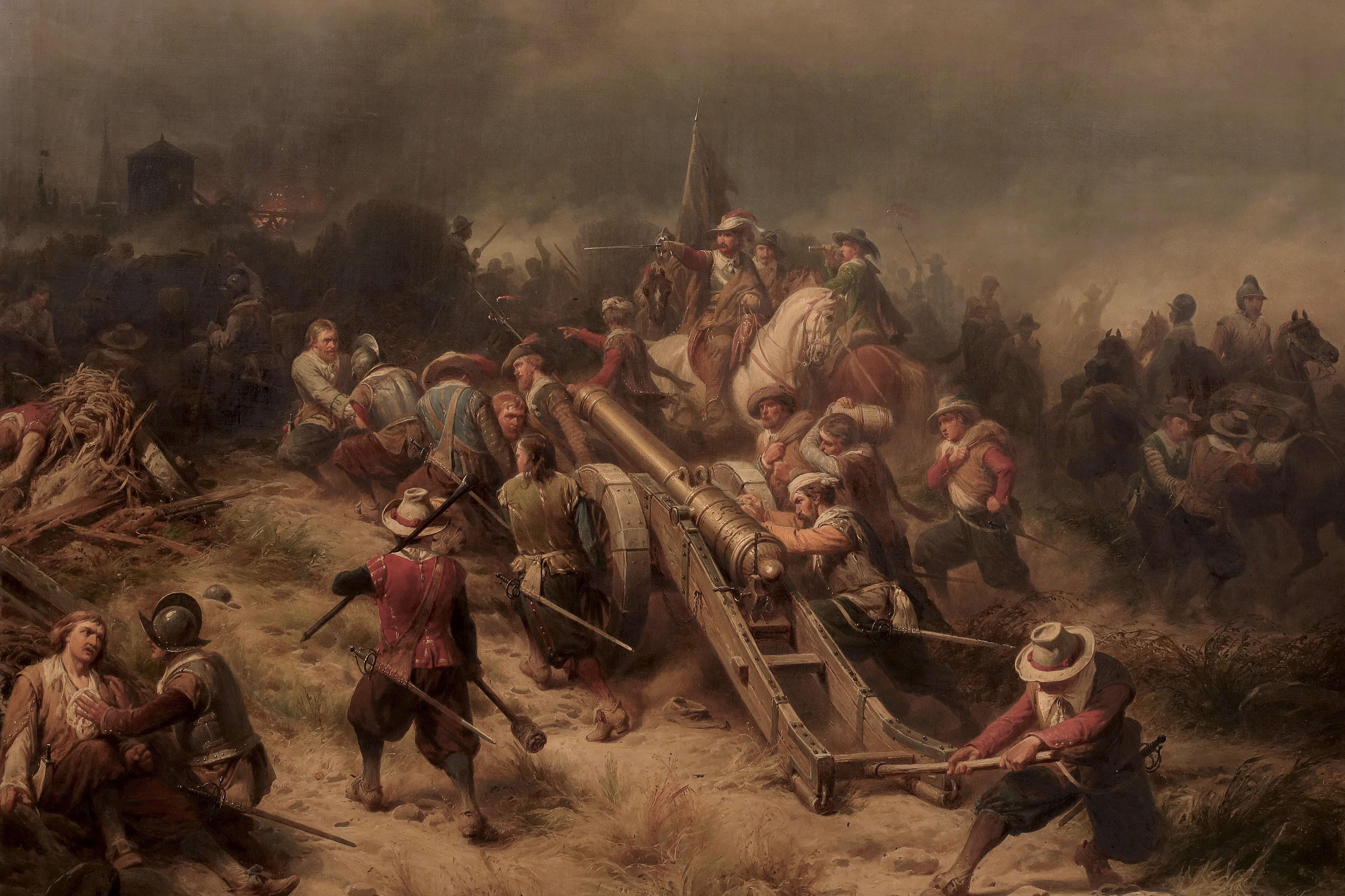
Bernard's troops storming Breisach's defences

Reinach, now down to 400, was surviving by chewing horse and cow hides. Reinach finally reached an agreement with Bernard about the surrender on December 19, in exchange for free passage. Bernard intended for Breisach to be the new capital of his duchy. As a reprisal for the alleged atrocities, Bernhard deliberately humiliated Reinach's troops as they staggered out of Breisach. He was determined to claim his triumph, riding Werth's horse captured at Rheinfelden as he entered the fortress. He obliged Reinach to leave the government archive behind as he intended Breisach as a capital for his own principality. He also insisted on garrisoning it with his own men and not those of the French, who had spent 1.1 million talers on a campaign that claimed at least 24,000 lives.

=== Franche-Comté and Alsace ===
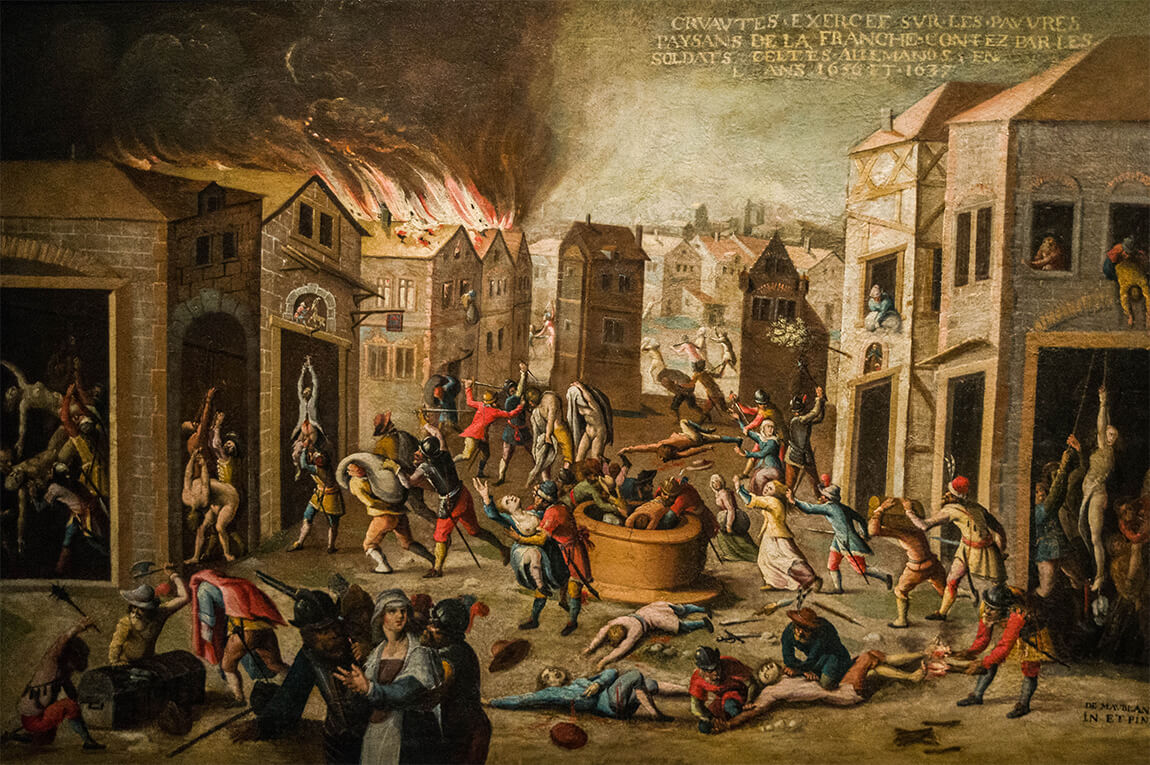
A massacre in the Franche-Comté, 1637

In 1637, three armies invaded the Franche-Comté simultaneously: Bernard via the Saône, Jacques Rouxel de Grancey via Montbélliard, and Henri d'Orléans-Longueville via Bresse. On March 29, 1637, the wealthy town of Saint-Amour, Jura, in the Bailiwick of Aval, was besieged by the Duke of Longueville. Despite a week's resistance from its inhabitants, the town fell into French hands, along with several other villages in the surrounding area. Bernard overran large parts of the Franche-Comté, where he mainly faced peasants.

In 1639 another Franco-Weimaran Army finally captured Thann, the last Alsatian outpost of Charles of Lorraine. He escaped with his mistress and 1,600 troops across the western edge of his duchy to Sierck on the Luxembourg frontier in February, leaving a few isolated garrisons in Lorraine, but exposing the Franche-Comté. The war had shifted deeper into the Empire, as Bernhard could now be reinforced to operate east of the Rhine.

== Aftermath ==
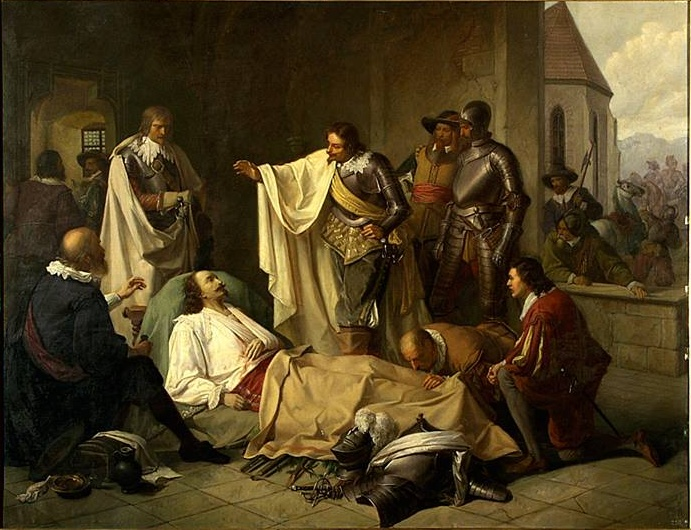
Henri de Rohan with an ill Bernard before his death

With Bernard's victory now complete, he moved his army back to Breisach; he planned to consolidate the control of his Duchy in Alsace and Breisgau and hoped to become more independent from the French. Bernard's health, however, was deteriorating. He died at Neuenburg am Rhein at the beginning of the new campaign. The governor of Breisach Johann Ludwig von Erlach was bribed to transfer the fortress to France. Bernard was temporarily buried at Breisach, his remains were not carried to Weimar until 16 years later.

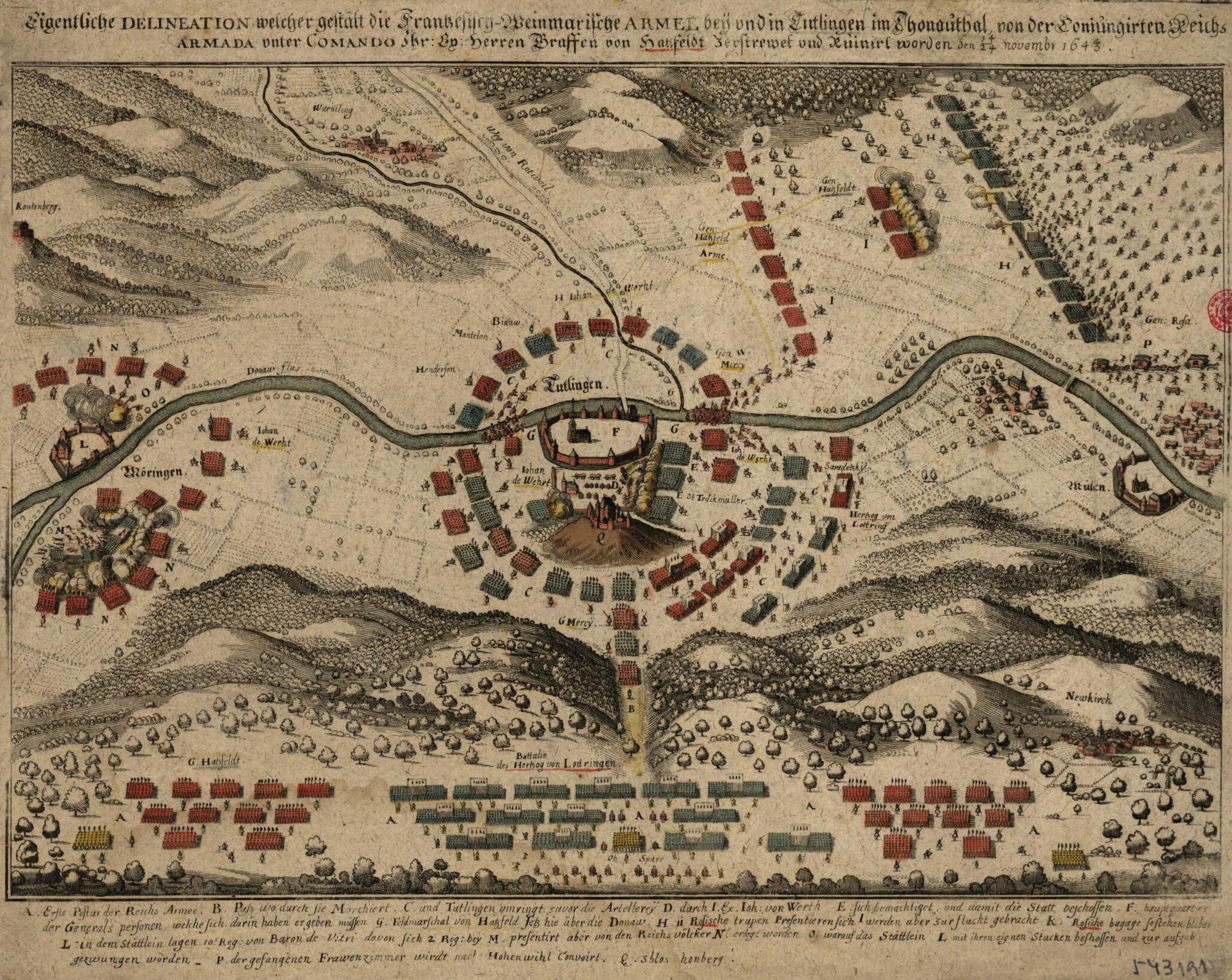
The Battle of Tuttlingen

Most of Bernard's army remained under the French general Jean-Baptiste Budes, Comte de Guébriant, who transferred the army to direct French control. Guébriant would continue the German Campaign by winning important victories at Wolfenbüttel and Kempen but he was mortally wounded at Rottweil in 1643. Guébriant's successor, Josias von Rantzau, blundered at Tuttlingen and the French were reduced to Hohentwiel, erasing most of Bernard's gains.

Bernard's campaign managed to cut the Spanish Road, forcing the Spanish to use the far more dangerous sea route, and making it harder to reinforce the Spanish Netherlands.

== Works cited ==
- Wilson, Peter (2011). The Thirty Years War: Europe's Tragedy. London: Belknap Press. ISBN 978-0-674-06231-3.
- Wedgewood, C.V. The Thirty Years War. pp. 404–406.
- Bodart, Gaston (1908). Militär-historisches Kriegs-Lexikon (1618–1905).
- E. O. Schmidt, "Deutschlands Schlachtfelder: Berichte über die Schlachten, die seit 1620 – 1813 auf deutschem Boden stattfanden", digitale Kopie
- Georg Schmidt, "Die Reiter der Apokalypse. Geschichte des Dreißigjährigen Krieges", C. H. Beck, München 2018. ISBN 978-3-406-71836-6.
- O. Schmidt, "Geschichte des Dreißigjährigen Krieges", S. 283ff, digitale Kopie
- Carl Du Jarrys de la Roche, "Der Dreißigjährige Krieg aus militärischer Sicht", Band 3, S. 152 digitale Kopie
- Rothenburg, Friedrich Rudolf von (1835). Schlachten, Belagerungen und Gefechte in Deutschland und den angrenzenden Ländern [Battles, sieges and skirmishes in Germany and the neighboring countries] (in German). Vienna: Hirschfeld.
- Theatrum Europaeum. Band 3, S. 935–936, urn:nbn:de:bvb:384-uba000238-6.
- Ackermann, Astrid (2023). Herzog Bernhard von Weimar: Militärunternehmer und politischer Stratege im Dreißigjährigen Krieg (in German). De Gruyter. ISBN 978-3-1107-0191-3.
