= Falken =

Falken may refer to:

- Falken Tire, a brand of tires
- SK Falken, a Norwegian speed skating club
- Svenska Aero Falken, a Swedish trainer aircraft

== See also ==
- Falcon
- Falke family
