= Battle of Thann (1638) =

Part of the Thirty Years' War

- Part of the Thirty Years' War
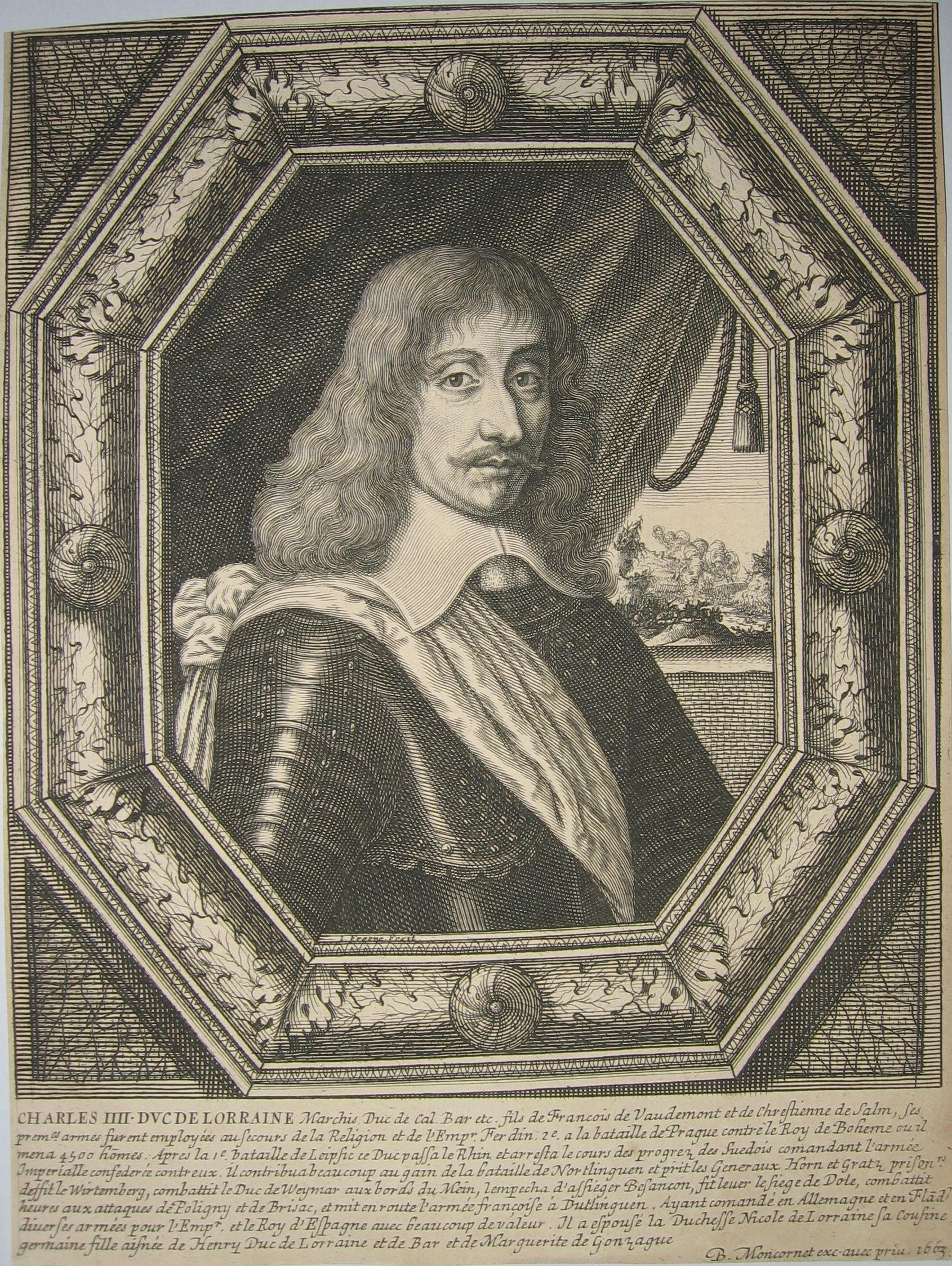
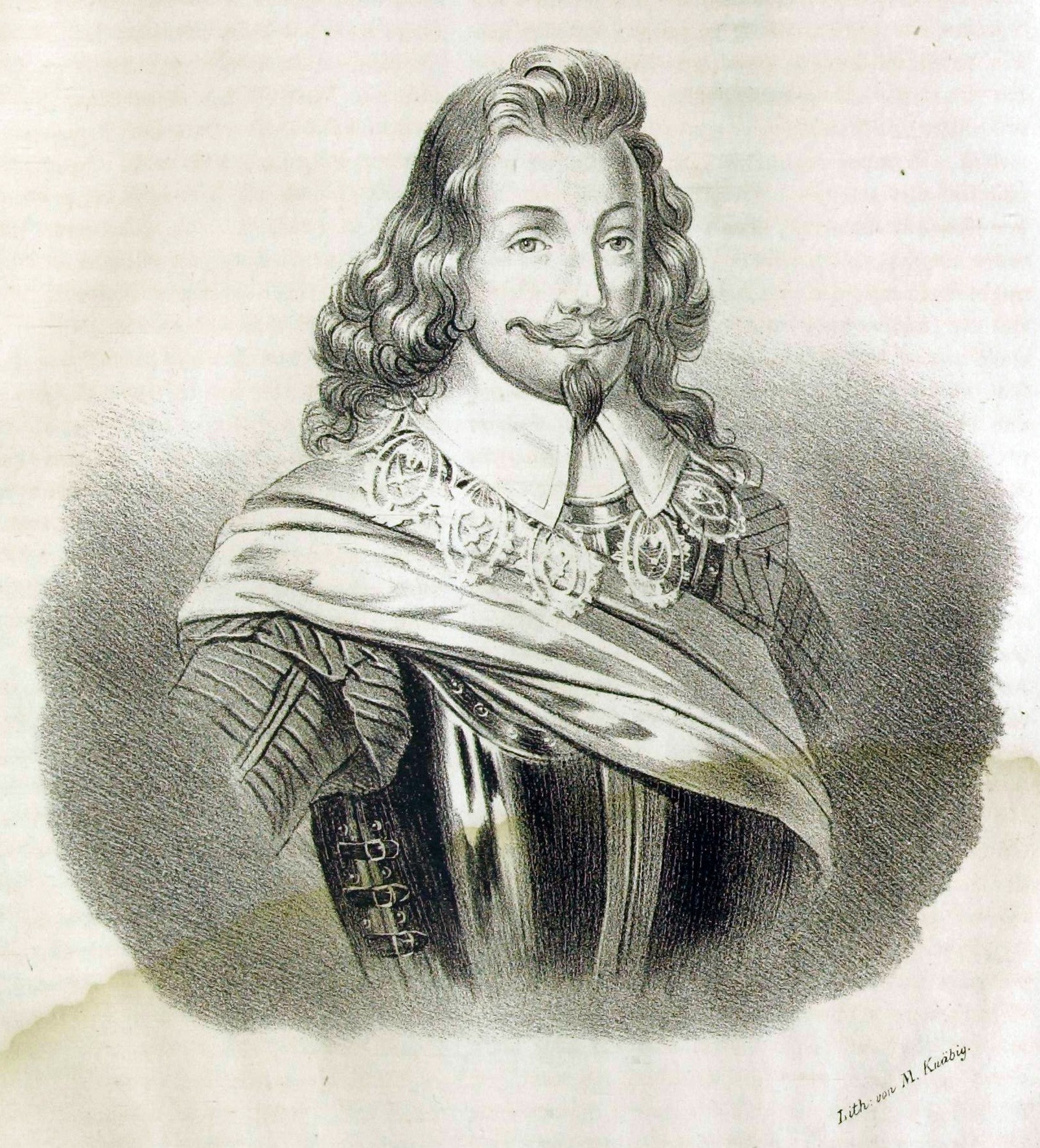
- Charles IV, Duke of Lorraine and Bar, the commander of the Imperial Army Bernard of Saxe-Weimar, commander of the Franco-Weimaran Army
| Date | October 15, 1638 |
| Location | Thann, Haut-Rhin and Sennen, Haut-Rhin, South West of Colmar, in Alsace |
| Result | Franco-Weimaran victory |
| Territorial changes | Imperials withdrawal back to the Franché-Comte |

Belligerents
| France; Weimar Army | Holy Roman Empire; Duchy of Lorraine |

Commanders and leaders
| Bernhard of Saxe-Weimar; Reinhold von Rosen; Wilhelm Otto von Nassau-Siegen (WIA); Ludwig von Wietersheim †; Count of Wittgenstein (WIA) | (Duchy of Lorraine) (Holy Roman Empire) Charles de Lorraine (Duchy of Lorraine) Anne-François de Bassompierre (POW) (Duchy of Lorraine) Colonel Vernier (POW) (Duchy of Lorraine) Lieutenant Colonel Fleckenstein (POW) |

Units involved
| (Kingdom of France) French Army of Germany; Weimar Army | (Duchy of Lorraine) Exiled Lorraine Army (Holy Roman Empire) Imperial Army |

Strength
| 4,800 | 4,000 |

Casualties and losses
| Insignificant | 400 killed 44 Colors baggage train All the Artillery; Many officers and soldiers captured |

The Battle of Thann (1638) was fought between the Weimar Army in the Service of the French, under Bernard of Saxe-Weimar and an Imperial-Lorraine under Charles de Lorraine. The battle was won by the Weimarans and the Imperials retreated back to the Franche-Comté, this was one of many attempts to relieve the besieged Breisach.

The battle was one of Bernard's victories and was a part of Bernard's Upper Rhine campaign, Thann was the last Alsatian stronghold of Charles and he was reduced to the Franche-Comté and Thionville. This victory also fully cemented France's control of Alsace. The site of the battle lies in Alsace between the towns of Thann, Haut-Rhin and Sennen, Haut-Rhin, present-day Cernay, Haut-Rhin.

== Background ==
Following the Swedish defeat at the Battle of Nördlingen in 1634, Bernhard's mercenary army had come under the pay of France. Having been pushed to the west bank of the Rhine by the Imperial advance, Bernhard's army had settled in Alsace during 1635 and had done little except help repulse the Imperial invasion of France under the Cardinal-Infante Ferdinand and Matthias Gallas in 1636.

=== Bernard's Rhine Campaign ===
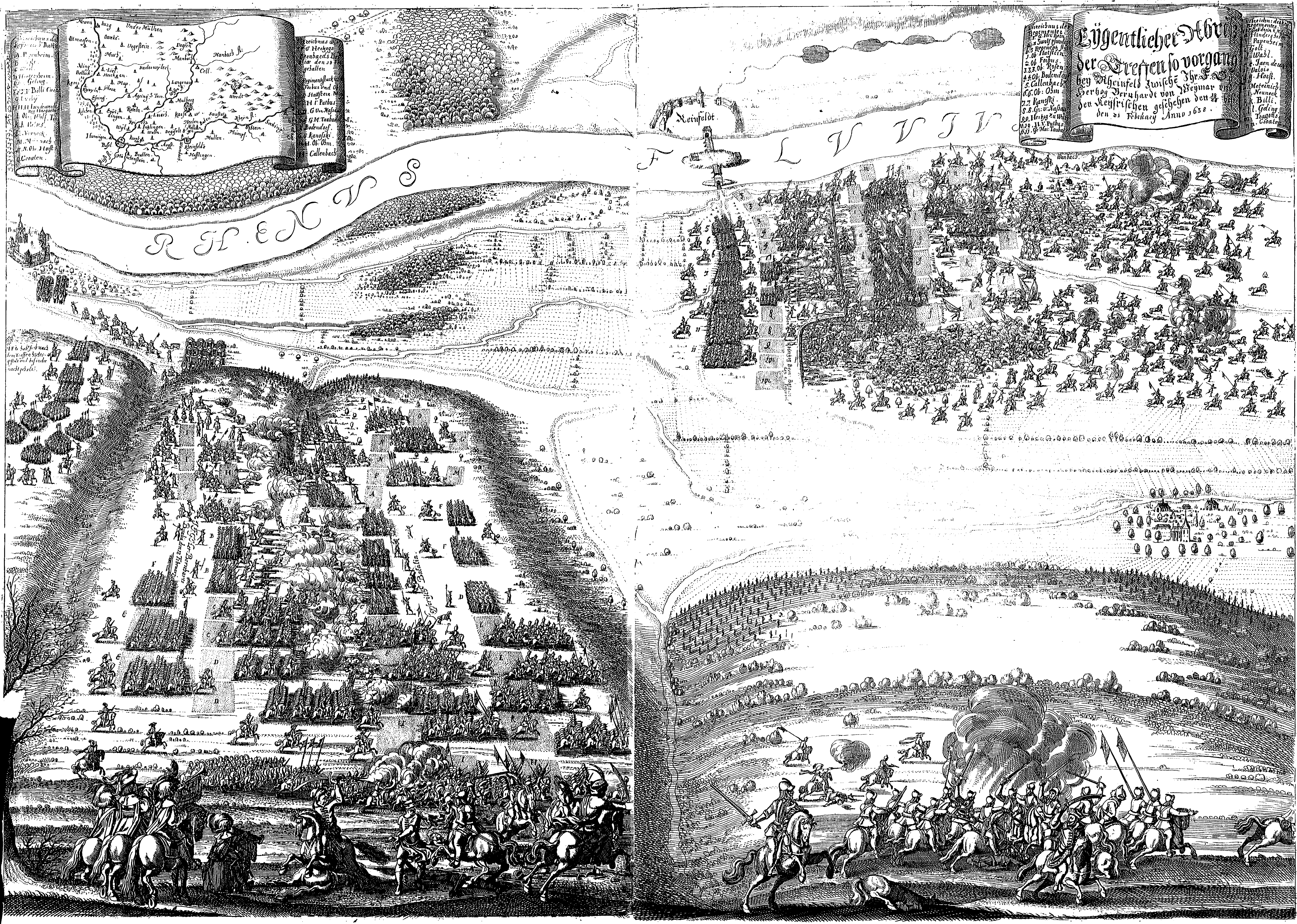
Battle of Rheinfelden

The army of general Bernhard of Saxe-Weimar, mostly German mercenaries formerly in service of Sweden, now financed by France, had established itself in the southwest of the empire on the Upper Rhine. In early in February 1638, having been prodded by the French government, Bernhard advanced his army of 6,000 men and 14 guns to the Rhine. Since May 19, the Weimar army had besieged the imperial fortress of Breisach, the most important and strongest fortress in the southwest of the empire, which could not be defeated militarily but only through a lack of supplies. Bernhard was supported by French troops, commanded by the later Marshal Henri de La Tour d'Auvergne, vicomte de Turenne.

The besieged Breisach Fortress suffered from a severe lack of food soon after the siege began and attempts to provide relief and supplies to the fortress were therefore urgently needed. The first attempt by an Imperial Bavarian army came three months after the siege began under the leadership of the generals Federigo Savelli and Johann von Götzen.

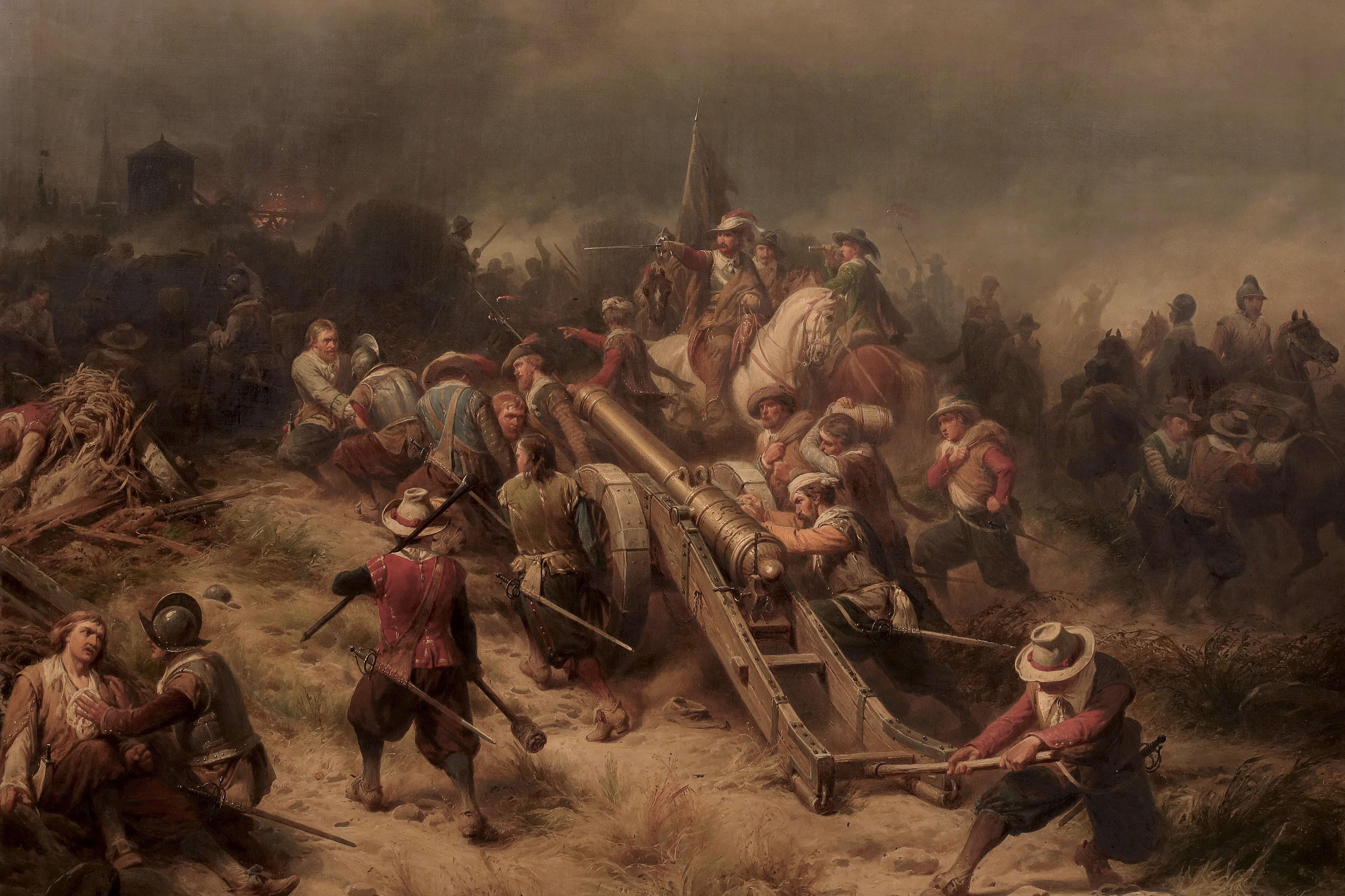
Siege of Breisach

On August 9, an attempt to relieve and supply the fortress by an Imperial-Bavarian army of 18,000 men under Savelli and Götz had already failed completely in the Battle of Wittenweiher. When in October, after a five-month siege, the supply situation of the besieged fortress of Breisach had become very precarious, Duke Charles of Lorraine and Bar wanted to try again to bring a supply train to the fortress.

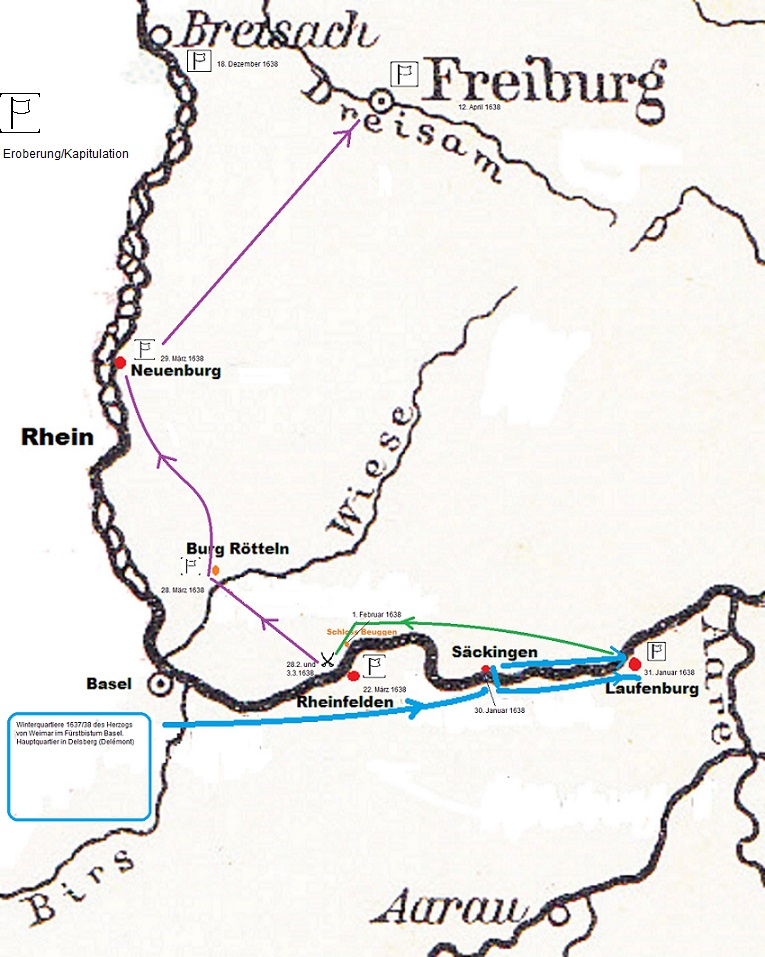
A map of Bernard's Rhine Campaign

== Line Up ==
=== Franco-Weimaran side ===
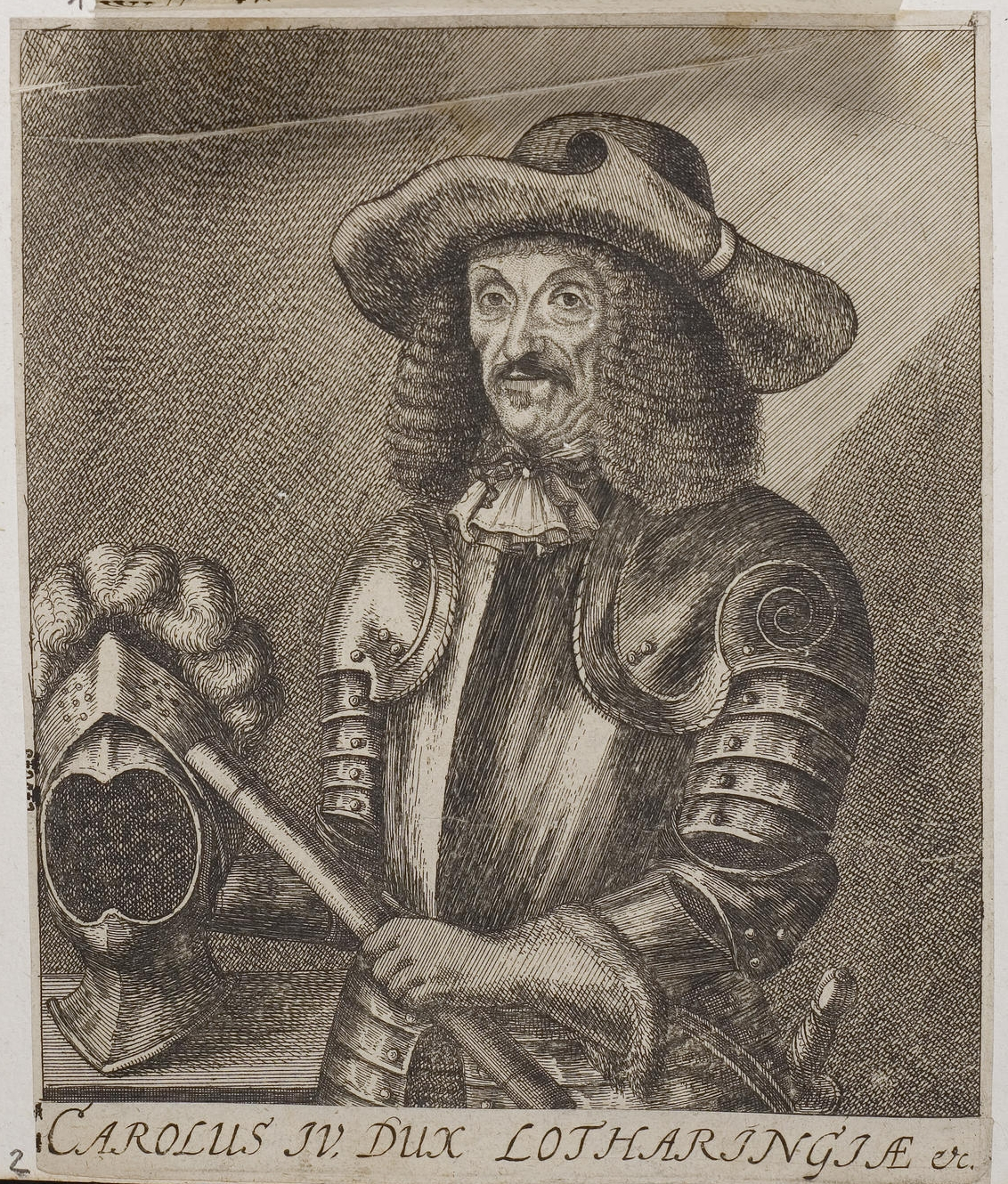
Charles de Lorraine-Bar

The Franco-Weimaran Army was set up outside of south of Thann. Numbering around 4,800, the Franco-Weimaran Army was under overall command of Bernard of Saxe-Weimar. His subordinate officers were Reinhold von Rosen, Wilhelm Otto von Nassau-Siegen, Johann Ludwig von Erlach, Sigismund von Erlach, and Johann Bernard Ohm.

=== Allied side ===
The Allied army was set up north of Thann. Their army was under the command of the exiled Duke Charles IV of Lorraine and was composed of the exiled Lorraine troops along with contingents of Imperial and Burgundian troops troops.

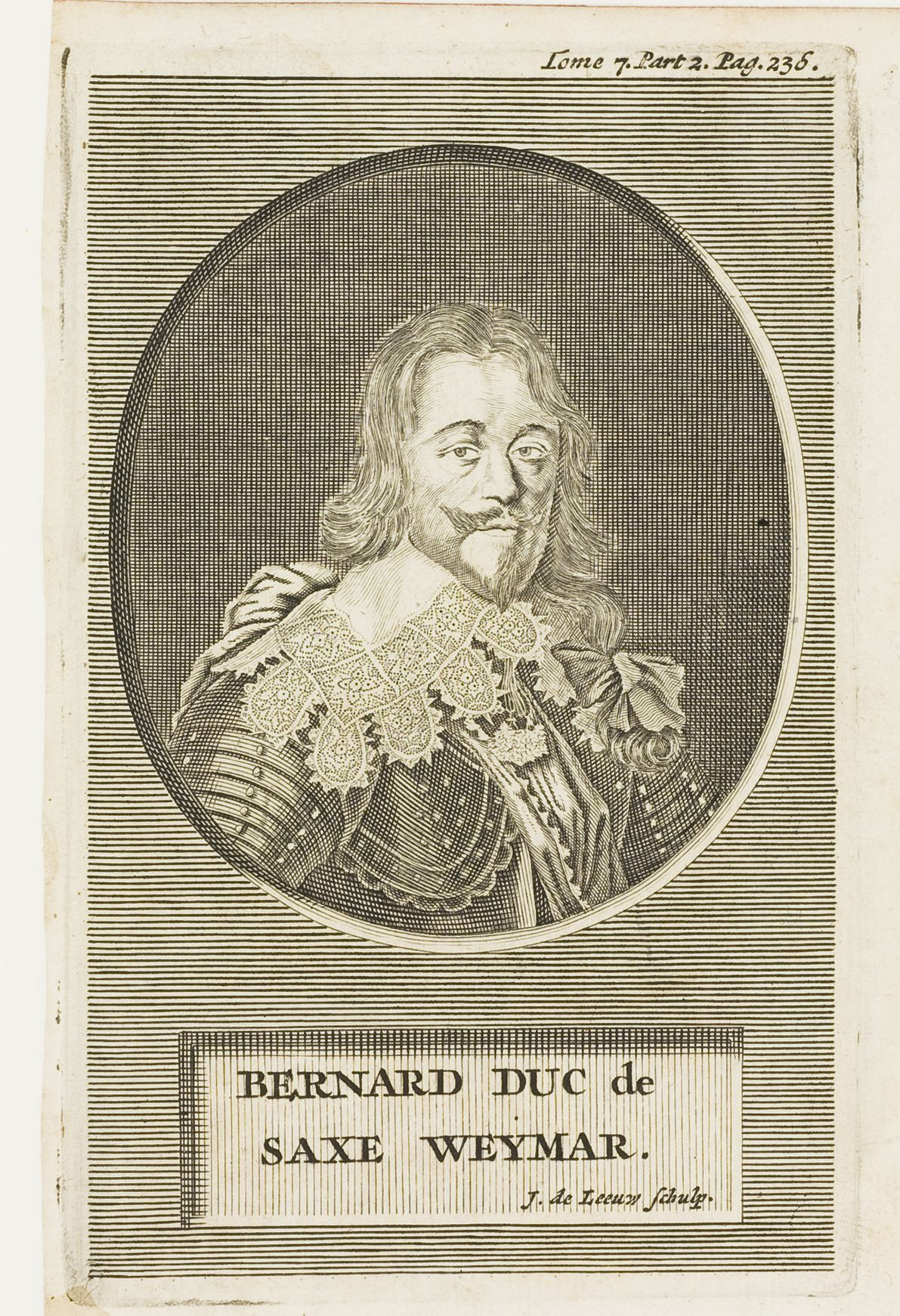
Bernard of Saxe-Weimar

== Battle ==
When the advancing army under Charles of Lorraine, numbering 4,000 men and its accompanying supply train with numerous supply wagons, entered the town of Thann, news of the army's arrival soon reached Colonel Reinhold von Rosen, who, as commander of a Weimar branch of the army, was conducting the siege of the fortress of Château de Landskron, about 50 km from Thann. With a request for reinforcements, General Rosen immediately sent the news of the army's arrival to Commander-in-Chief Bernhard von Weimar in Colmar. Although he was ill with fever, Bernhard of Saxe-Weimar immediately moved from Colmar to La Croix-aux-Mines, about 70 km south, where reserve troops were stationed under the command of William Otto of Nassau-Siegen.

With these troops and several hundred musketeers, reinforced by French troops and eight regimental guns, the two generals moved north again to Ensisheim, about 60 km away, 20 km east of the town of Thann, where the Lorraine relief army and its supply train, had initially been reported, but then moved on.

=== The Action ===
Since a reconnaissance party sent by Bernhard got lost while searching for the enemy army, his troops were initially to seek a waiting position in a forest. When the Lorraine relief army under Duke Charles and its supply train were discovered on October 15, 1638, on the Ochsenfeld between the towns of Thann and Cernay, the two armies unexpectedly clashed. The left wing of Charles's troops was fiercely attacked by Bernard's cavalry and threatened to be completely dispersed if the Lorraine right wing had not simultaneously successfully defeated Bernard's left wing and even captured its artillery. Only through his personal efforts was Bernard able to regroup the troops of the left wing and lead them into a counterattack.

The counterattack was so successful that the Weimar troops not only recaptured their own artillery but also captured the Lorraine artillery. The Lorraine cavalry and Duke Charles himself then turned to flight. The infantry managed to hold out for another two hours, but after the explosion of two powder wagons, they also turned to flight. Duke Charles, who had lost his horse, narrowly escaped on foot to Thann. The Duke of Weimar's booty included all the artillery, baggage, 44 colors, and, above all, all the grain intended for Breisach. In addition, there were numerous captured officers and soldiers. Bernards's cavalry showed superior discipline, returning to the field having broken Charles's cavalry and assisted their infantry crush Charles's infantry, who fought for two hours before breaking and retreating back.

== Aftermath ==
The fleeing Lorraine troops were not pursued any further, as another attempt to relieve the fortress of Breisach by a Bavarian army under Johann von Götzen had already been reported and Bernhard had to immediately hurry back to Breisach with the troops. Eventually the survivors of Breisach would surrender, this allowed Bernard to fully control Alsace and the Breisgau and his armies rampaged south overrunning many of the Franche-Comté fortresses but he would die in Breisach.

=== Losses ===
In addition, there were numerous captured officers and soldiers. On the Lorraine side, Field Marshal Anne-François de Bassompierre, (Note: a cousin of the Duke) Colonel Vernier, and Lieutenant Colonel Fleckenstein were taken prisoner. The Weimar troops lost Colonel Ludwig von Wietersheim; the Count of Nassau and the Count of Wittgenstein were wounded. The Duke of Weimar's booty included all the artillery, baggage, 44 colors, and all the grain intended for Breisach.

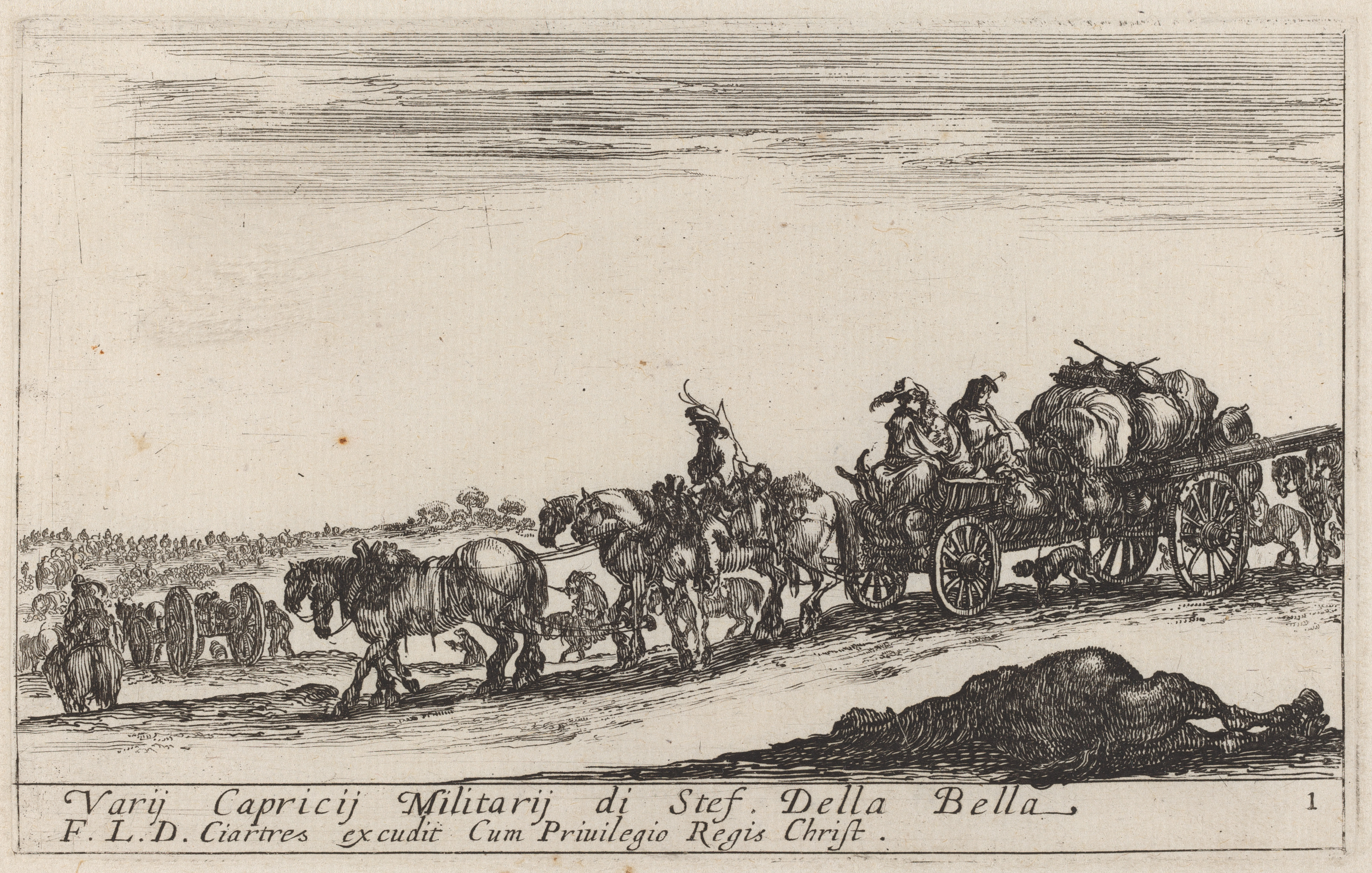
An Imperial Baggage Train (Note: Not at the battle)

== Sources ==
- Gaston Bodart, Militär-historisches Kriegs-Lexikon (1618–1905),S. 63
- Rothenburg, Friedrich Rudolf von (1835). Schlachten, Belagerungen und Gefechte in Deutschland und den angrenzenden Ländern [Battles, sieges and skirmishes in Germany and the neighboring countries] (in German). Vienna: Hirschfeld.
- Theatrum Europaeum. Band 3, S. 935–936, urn:nbn:de:bvb:384-uba000238-6.
- Wilson, Peter H. (2009). Europe's Tragedy: A History of the Thirty Years War. Allen Lane. ISBN 978-0-7139-9592-3.
