= Battle of Wittenweiher =

1638 battle of the Thirty Years' War

- Part of the Thirty Years' War
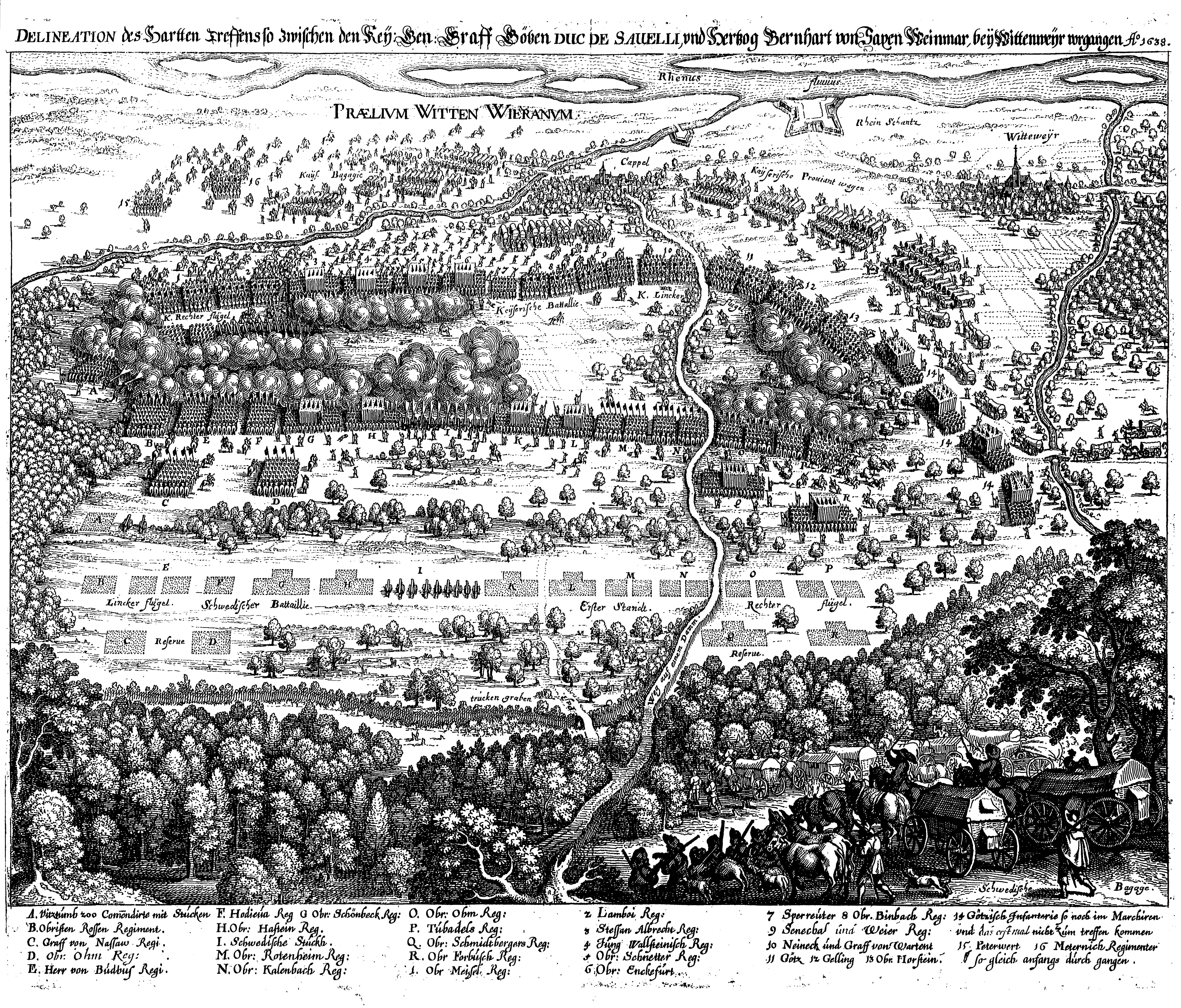
- Battle of Wittenweiher
Date	9 August 1638
Location	Schwanau, Baden-Württemberg
Result	French-Weimaran victory

Belligerents
France; Weimar Army	Holy Roman Empire; Electorate of Bavaria

Commanders and leaders
Bernard of Saxe-Weimar	(Holy Roman Empire) Federico Savelli (Electorate of Bavaria) Johann von Götzen

Strength
13,000	18,500

Casualties and losses
1,600 killed or wounded	1,500 killed or wounded 1,300 captured

The Battle of Wittenweiher took place on August 9, 1638, near the village of Wittenweiher today: Wittenweier, a district of Schwanau, Baden-Württemberg, which was completely destroyed in the course of the battle.

== History ==
The army of general Bernhard of Saxe-Weimar, mostly German mercenaries formerly in service of Sweden, now financed by France, had established itself in the southwest of the empire on the Upper Rhine after the Battle of Rheinfelden won in the spring. Since May 19, this army had besieged the imperial fortress Breisach and was supported by French troops, commanded by the later Marshal Turenne.

The besieged Breisach Fortress suffered from a severe lack of food soon after the siege began and attempts to provide relief and supplies to the fortress were therefore urgently needed. The first attempt by an Imperial Bavarian army came three months after the siege began under the leadership of the generals Federigo Savelli and Johann von Götzen.

== Lineup ==
The Imperial Bavarian Army had set out from Offenburg, had a strength of around 18,500 men and accompanied a supply train with many provision wagons for the Breisach Fortress. The approach of this army did not go unnoticed by Bernhard of Saxe-Weimar and he moved with part of his siege troops - a total of 13,000 so-called Weimarians - from their quarters near Langendezlingen to meet the advancing enemy. But their opponent had also learned of the Weimarians' departure, stopped the advance and initially entrenched themselves in a solid position near Friesenheim in order to repel the expected attack. However, the Weimarians did not allow themselves to be tempted to risk the risky attack and withdrew to Mahlberg, expecting that the supply convoy was destined for the Breisach Fortress and therefore had to leave soon in any case. to achieve his goal.

In fact, the supply train set off again towards Breisach and began to take up a new battle formation near the village of Wittenweiher. The right wing of the imperial troops under Götzen was near Wittenweier and the left wing under Savelli was oriented towards Kappel.

Bernhard's troops had also marched quickly from Mahlberg, first had to pass through a forest and a bridge to get to the center of the battle formation and then positioned themselves on the edge of the forest. While Reinhold von Rosen commanded the right wing, the reserve was under the command of Colonel Kanoffski (also: Chanowsky). The left wing was led by Georg Christoph von Taupadel, the reserve by Count Wilhelm Otto von Nassau-Siegen.

== Course of battle ==
At first the artillery opened the battle, but soon imperial cuirassiers and other cavalry on the left wing under Götzen stormed against Taupadel's troops and drove the Weimaraner so far back that the reserves had to intervene . With their reinforcements, the imperial cavalry was thrown far back and began to flee. At the same time, Rosen and Nassau also attacked the Bavarian and imperial cavalry on the right wing and pushed them back to the infantry, who then fled.

Duke Bernhard now sent trumpeters and drummers into the forest to simulate an attack from a distant side. The Imperials fell for the trick and moved troops to the site of the expected attack. Weimaran troops were now able to advance in the center and a bloody battle with naked arms broke out. Savelli was shot in the back and had to be taken away wounded. In the course of the fighting, the Imperial forces captured the Weimaran artillery, which, however, no longer had any ammunition. At the same time, the Weimaraners also managed to capture the imperial guns, whose crews fled or were killed. These cannons were turned around and used very effectively against the Imperial Bavarian troops.

After five hours the Imperials gave up the battle, evacuated the field and fled towards Offenburg. 4,000 men led by Götzen secured the bridge for the retreat. When the Weimaraners pursued impetuously, Taupadel was taken prisoner and the Count of Nassau was wounded.

Bernhard's troops captured 12 guns, 60 flags and the entire baggage of the Imperial Bavarian troops, of which 1,500 men remained dead or wounded on the battlefield. 1,300 men were taken prisoner. On the Weimaraner side there were around 600 dead and 1,000 wounded.

== Aftermath ==
Since there was no reinforcement for Breisach, the situation of the fortress became more and more desperate. The rations now served the besiegers, who were also supplied with ammunition.

After receiving 5,000 men reinforcements by Guillaume de Lamboy in autumn, Götzen tried again to supply the fortress. In October, he tried to approach Breisach from the south while Duke Charles of Lorraine did the same from Alsace. Bernhard managed to intercept both, first the Duke of Lorraine at Thann, then Götzen at Breisach who had already started to attack the besiegers. Without further hope of relief, the most important imperial fortress in southwest Germany capitulated on December 17, 1638.

According to contemporary reports, the large ditch, which today marks the boundary between Nonnenweier and Wittenweier, is said to have turned blood-red as a result of the battle. That's why it is still called the Blood Ditch today. In August 2009, a memorial plaque was erected there to commemorate the battle.

== Sources ==
- E. O. Schmidt, „Deutschlands Schlachtfelder: Berichte über die Schlachten, die seit 1620 – 1813 auf deutschem Boden stattfanden“, digitale Kopie
- Georg Schmidt, „Die Reiter der Apokalypse. Geschichte des Dreißigjährigen Krieges“, C. H. Beck, München 2018. ISBN 978-3-406-71836-6.
- O. Schmidt, „Geschichte des Dreißigjährigen Krieges“, S. 283ff, digitale Kopie
- Carl Du Jarrys de la Roche, „Der Dreißigjährige Krieg aus militärischer Sicht“, Band 3, S. 152 digitale Kopie
- Gaston Bodart, „Militärhistorisches Kriegslexikon (1618-1905)“,S. 62
