= Falke family =

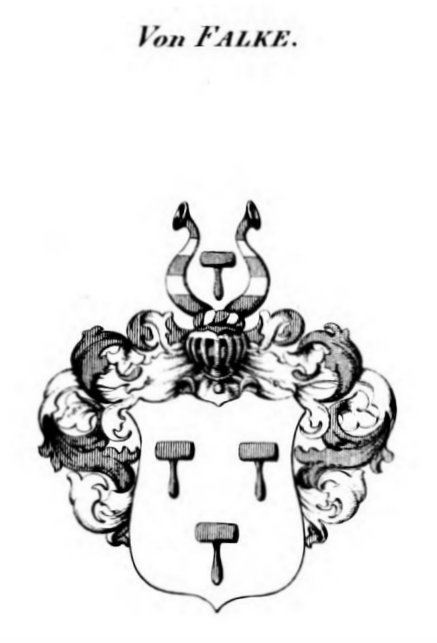
Falke coat of Arms

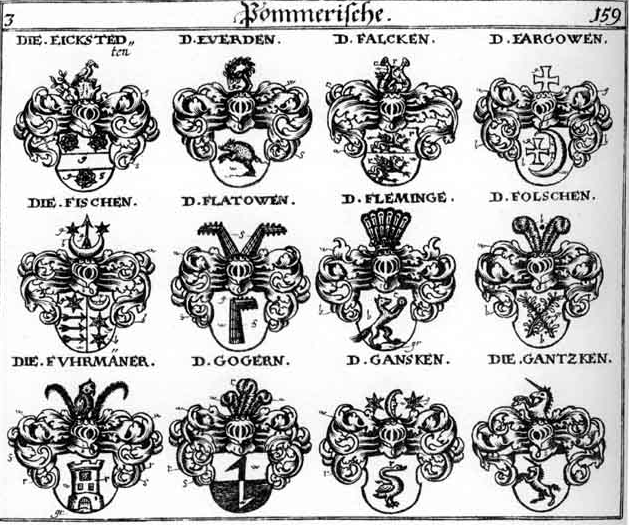
Falcken Pommern Greifenhaus

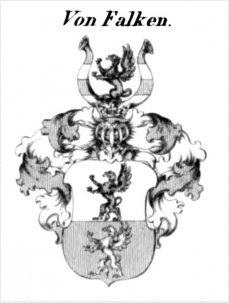
Falken and Falkenreck Coat of Arms

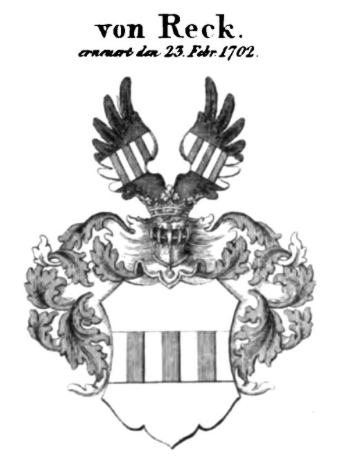
(von) Reck family

The Falke family is an ancient German noble family (Uradel). The name is originally spelled Falcken, Falken, Falkenreck, also Falken-Reck.

== History ==
Originally from Hesse, they are direct male-line descendants of the Reginarids and therefore one of the oldest still existing noble families in Europe. They carried the titles Knight, Lord, Count and Freiherr of different dominium plenum and dominium directum. This noble family thrived in the Middle Ages between 1300-1600 and had branches in Hessen, Saxony, Pommern and Westphalia (County Mark and Fbd. Münster) Falken. The coat of arms this family used in Hessen and Thüringen and Saxony is different from the branch who was ruling parts of Pommern and Westphalia. The latter used a Griffin which was derived from the coat of arms of the "Greifenhaus" in Pommern. The griffin coat of arms still refers to the coat of arms used in Hessen and Thuringia and Saxony by using the same horns and red and white colours in the horns.

This Falcken family, whose patriarch is “Knight” Heyso Falcken, (mentioned in 1359) is a bastard son. of the House of Hesse (they are descendants from the House of Reginar). The territory of the Falke/Falcken/Falken expanded between 1359 and 1557 from the Middle of Germany to the East. From the East to the North-East and eventually to the West of Germany in County Mark and Fbd. Münster. This is where one branch of the Falken family merges with the noble family von Reck Recke (Adelsgeschlecht). The merging of these two Nobility names had to be approved by the Monarch in the 16th century in the Holy Roman Empire

Ancient spelling of name - FalckenReck - still used in 1934

There is a small number of German noble families that do not carry “von”. These are the "Uradel" (e.g. Haus Reuß).

The branch in Saxony/Pommern merges in Westphalia with the Catholic branch of the powerful von Reck family. This happens after Christoffel Falcken sells his castle in Triestewitz to the House of Saxony in order to leave the converted Lutheran Kingdom and move to West Germany to protect the Catholic Fbd. Münster on behalf of Charles V, who he advised together with the ancient noble family von Carlowitz, Christoph von Carlowitz. The Fal(c)ken "uradliger" family protects Fbd.Münster together with the Catholic branch of the von Reck (also von der Recke) family and together with the family von Raesfeld at the time when Bernhard von Raesfeld becomes the Regent of Münster (Fürstbischof of Münster in 1557). One of the Falkenreck estates (originally 250-300 acres), next to one of the Raesfeld estates in Gütersloh (Sundern), was sold in 2015 to the municipality of Gütersloh. The Falkenreck estate is called Falkenrecks Heide. This estate has been in the family since 1557. After the Holy Roman Empire lost power in Germany, the Fal(c)ken/Falkenreck noble family were not allowed to hold a governing position as long as they remained Catholic.

The Falcken noble family (Uradlig) collaborated closely with:

- House of Hesse
- House of Wettin: the Falcken (Liborius and Mathis) were also based in Wettin, Kliczschen, Triestewitz and Droferen in 1424, to protect the border of Saxony and Meissen and to take the lead in the Hussite Wars
- House of Griffins

“Ritter” Heyso (and Konrad) founded the Falken in 29 Sept 1385.

=== Notable figures ===
- Heyso Falcken (1335–1393), Knight (Ritter) Falken (Ritterbund) at the Normannstein castle and at Burgruine Haineck.
- Heinrich Falcken (1379–1428), Lord of Falken
- Mathis Falcken (1406-1485), Count of East Saxony
- Christoffel Falcken (1495-1578), Count of East Saxony and Advisor to Charles V and Moritz of Saxony (Räte der sächsischen Herzöge und Kurfürsten) at Castle Triestewitz
- Johann Falcken, Prime Minister of Pommern 1548-? (Pommerischen Kanzler) during the reign of Barnim XI, Duke of Pomerania
- Johann Reinhard Falken (1530-1585), Lord of Treffurt (including Falken) married to Genovefa Elisabeth Von Boineburg Boyneburg (Adelsgeschlecht)
- Clemens Falcken, (Thür-Sachsischer Jägermeister & Amts Hauptmann 1580) at Moritzburg Castle
- Anna Christine Falcken (1560-1602), married to Philipp Wilhelm von Hessen Kassel Herr von Cornberg, with whom she has 10 children. Christine Falcken dies in 1600, after which Philipp Wilhelm Cornberg marries Christine von Boyneburg in 1602 Philipp Wilhelm von Cornberg
- Anna Christine Falcken married Philipp Wilhelm von Cornberg (Adelsgeschlecht) on 3 September 1582
- Elisabeth Fal(c)ken (?-1631), married to Johann Graf von Götzen Freiherr von Samplebem und Lawingen, Generalfeldmarschall Holy Roman Empire Johann von Götzen,
- Johann Falcken, ein Evangelischer Jubel-Priester, kam an. 1617. ins Ministerium zu Limberg, wurde bald darauf Pastor zu Gehsenbeck, und starb daselbst den 8. Jan. 1674. im sieben und [130] achtzigsten Jahre seines Alters. Blum in Jubil. Theol. emer. p. 80.
- Friederike Charlotte von Falcke(n) (* 26. Oktober 1715; † 6. Januar 1762), married to Carl Magnus von Schwerin
- Johann Heinrich Falkenreck (1793-1838), Officer at Battle of Waterloo
- Louis Falkenreck He fought in the American Civil War (1861-1865). His battle unit name was: 6th regiment, New Jersey Infantry, side: Union. As of today the v. Falkenreck bloodline still continues in the USA. They made/make a living mainly as doctors and artists.
- Gerald C. Falkenreck (1911-1999) First Lieutenant and Dentist in the US Navy during World War II
- Gustaaf Richard Falkenreck (1904-1969) Selected for the Dutch Army Officers' Training Corps before World War II. He worked for the Sinclair Family and was called for battle to lead the heavy fights in the central part of Rotterdam during World War II. He was also a very skilled fencer
- Maurits Roland Falkenreck, advisor to the European Commission on the Digital Agenda (2010) Also writer of the book (written in 2014–2015, published 2017): "An entrepreneurial answer to the decline of the Dutch welfare state." In this book he explains the concept of the political ecosystem . In 2019 his concept and predictions proved to be visionary when the new political party FvD and other initiatives officially started to break down the existing political ecosystem and on top of that FvD announced they would build their own “Nieuwe Zuil” as a result copying the predictions and concept of the founder (= Maurits v. Falkenreck) of the Dutch humanist rationalist movement "De Nieuwe Zuil" (The New Column), which gives a platform to free thinking scientists, writers, innovators, artists and more. Inventor of biometric non-cash based transaction system (in 2006), which is being deployed by M-Tiba and which won the prestigious FT/IFC Award in 2017. He also shares his expertise as Lecturer Innovation at International Business Universities.
