= Johann von Götzen =

German nobleman

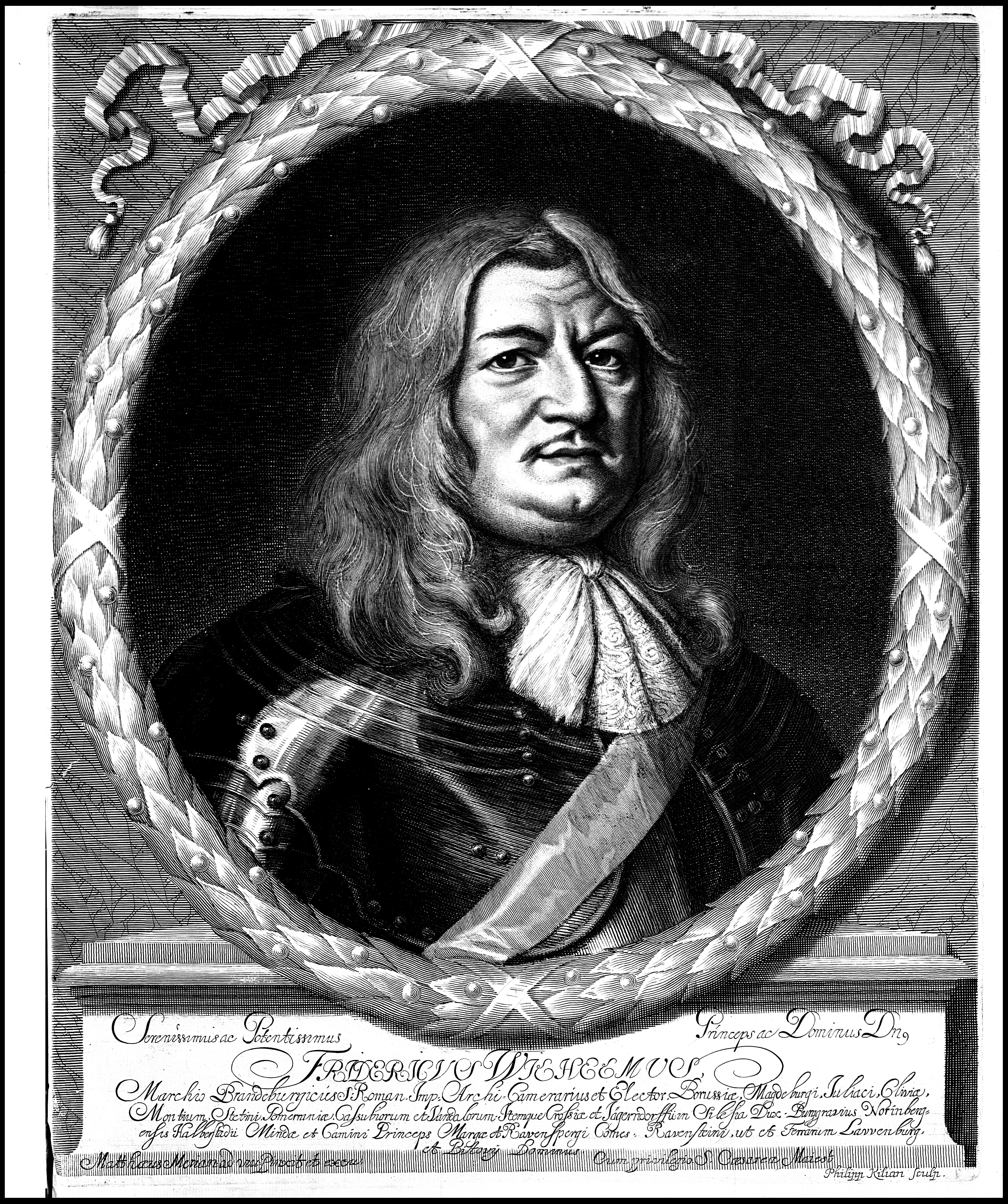
- Johann von Götzen
- Born: 1599; Lüneburg, Holy Roman Empire
- Died: 5 March 1645 (aged 45–46) Jankau, Holy Roman Empire
- Allegiance: Electoral Palatinate; Dutch Republic; Holy Roman Empire; Electorate of Bavaria
- Service years: 1618 – 1645
- Rank: Generalfeldmarschall
- Conflicts: Thirty Years' War: Battle of Dessau Bridge; Siege of Stralsund (1628); Battle of Lützen (1632); Battle of Nördlingen (1634); Hessian War; Battle of Wittenweiher; Battle of Breisach; Battle of Jankau

Johann von Götzen, known as Johann von Götz, (1599 – 5 March 1645) was a Lüneburg nobleman and Generalfeldmarschall who fought during the Thirty Years' War. He was married to Elisabeth (d. 1631) of the Falke family, with whom he had two sons: Johann Sigismund, Count of Götzen (1622–1622) and Johann Georg, Count of Götzen (1623–1679).

At the outbreak of the Thirty Years' War, Götzen joined the army of the Electoral Palatinate, defecting to the Holy Roman Empire after the Battle of Dessau Bridge. He attained the rank of Generalfeldmarschall in both the Electorate of Bavaria and Holy Roman Empire, gaining a reputation for his bravery. He was killed on 5 March 1645, while commanding the Imperial cavalry during the Battle of Jankau.

== Military career ==
Johann baron of Götzen (Note: Also known as Johann von Götz.) was born in 1599, to a noble, Lüneburg Lutheran family. At the outbreak of the Thirty Years' War he joined the army of the Electoral Palatinate, serving in the forces of Ernst von Mansfeld and the neutral Dutch Republic. Following the Mansfeld's defeat at the Battle of Dessau Bridge, he defected to the Imperialists. In 1626, he took part in the occupation of the Duchy of Pomerania, receiving the command of the island of Rügen two years later. In 1628, he participated in the unsuccessful siege of Stralsund, which had refused to adhere to the Capitulation of Franzburg. The 1630, Swedish intervention in the Thirty Years' War led to the loss of Pomerania, Götzen's forces remained in the area for a short period of time, engaging in the act of Brandschatzung (extorting money and resources from the local population under the threat of violence). He appears to have left the army following the dismissal of Imperial Albrecht von Wallenstein, on the same year.

On 13 April 1632, emperor Ferdinand II reinstated Wallenstein to the position of chief of staff. Wallenstein organized a complete overhaul of the Imperial army recalling Götzen into active service. On 6 November 1632, Götzen led a cavalry division at the Battle of Lützen. In 1633, Götzen was promoted to the rank of general. In the aftermath of Wallenstein's assassination he was placed under the command of Matthias Gallas, distinguishing himself at the Battle of Nördlingen (1634). In 1635, he was court–martialled for his poor performance in the Silesian campaign in combination with his prior association with Wallenstein. In 1636, his reputation as an experienced and brave commander earned him the rank of Generalfeldmarschall in the service of the Electorate of Bavaria, replacing Jost Maximilian von Bronckhorst-Gronsfeld. The Bavarians then ravaged through the Landgraviate of Hesse-Kassel, without being able to brake the stalemate of the Hessian War. In January 1637, the Bavarians reinforced the Imperialist blockades of Koblenz and the Ehrenbreitstein Fortress. The French garrisons protecting the fortresses had been isolated since August 1635. Two attempts to supply them had been intercepted, forcing the 195 survivors of the initial 2,000 force to surrender on 28 June 1637 in return for save passage home. In March 1637, Götzen and Melchior von Hatzfeldt departed for northern Germany, however following the Imperialist defeat at the Battle of Rheinfelden, Götzen was requested to deal with the threat posed by the Bernardine invasion of Schwarzwald.

Götzen rallied 13,500 troops at Rottweil aiming at relieving Breisach in conjunction with Charles of Lorraine whose 5,000 strong army was evading the numerically superior French in the Franche-Comté. On 26 June 1638, Götzen appeared north of Breisach, he chose not to attack Bernard directly but instead diverted his troops towards Alsace in the hope of taking the local French garrisons. The French refused to crack, forcing Götzen and to fall back to Offenburg where he was joined by Federico Savelli's 2,500 troops. Götzen's army was loading supplies onto barges at Rheinau, when Bernard drew 11,400 men from the siege lines, moving through Kenzingen and Lahr. It was only on 8 August, that Götzen's scouts reported that he was approaching. Götzen placed his artillery on the Schuttern hill, with the rest of the army holding a ditch between the hill and Friesenheim. The Battle of Wittenweiher was but a short skirmish, Bernard quickly disengaged after realizing that the terrain did not favor him. Meanwhile, Savelli was leading two thirds of the army along with a supply column heading towards Wittenweiher, failing to take the necessary precautions he was spotted soon after the column emerged from the Kaiserwald forest. Savelli's was disoriented by a combination of musket and cannon fire and cut down by a cavalry charge that followed immediately. Götzen arrived just early enough to prevent a complete collapse of the army. Still the Battle of Breisach proved disastrous, only 3,000 remained under Bavarian colors by the time they retreated to Offenburg, the rest being killed, captured or deserting, 3,000 wagons of food and ammunition were also lost to the enemy. Savelli's court connections protected him from a court martial, while the Bavarian morale fell significantly. Charles of Lorraine and Götzen made two more attempts to relieve Breisach on 15 September and 22 November, failing on both occasions due to a lack of coordination on Charles' part. Breisach fell on 19 December 1638, Götzen was scapegoated by Savelli and arrested.

Götzen was pronounced innocent and released in August 1640, returning into Imperial service as Generalfeldmarschall. In 1643, he campaigned in Silesia, a year later he was transferred to Hungary where he fought against George Rákóczi I's army. In 1645, he was recalled to Bohemia which faced a Swedish invasion. On 5 March 1645, he was killed by musket fire while commanding the Imperial cavalry during the Battle of Jankau. Götzen's actions at Breisach are defended by the titular character in the novel Simplicius Simplicissimus, written by Hans Jakob Christoffel von Grimmelshausen who took part in the operation as a soldier.

== Notes ==
Footnotes

Citations
