= Siege of Breisach =

1638 siege of the Thirty Years' War

- Part of the Thirty Years' War
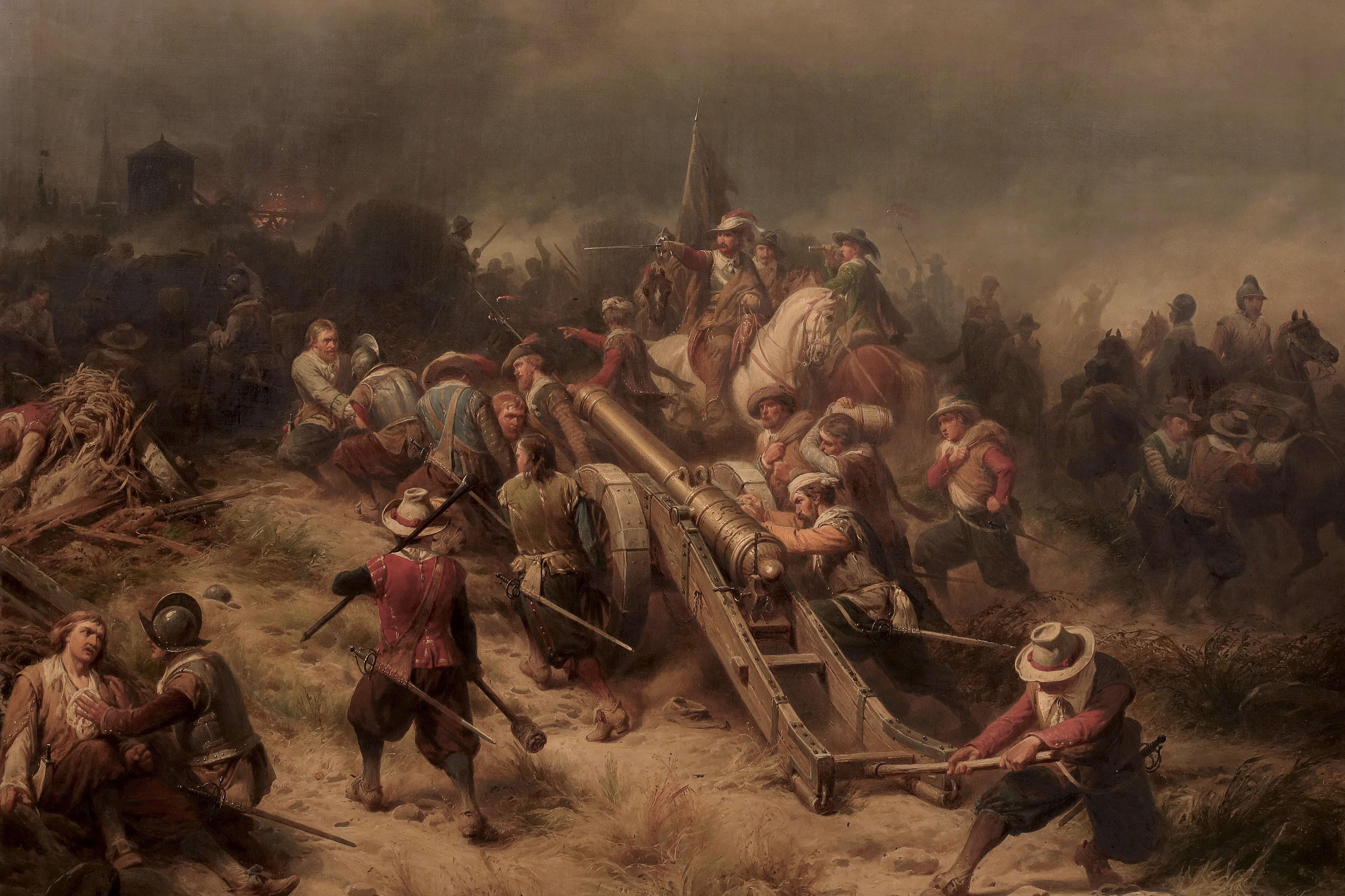
- the siege of Breisach
Date	18 August – 17 December 1638
Location	Breisach, Holy Roman Empire 48°2′N 7°35′E
Result	French-Weimaran victory

Belligerents
Kingdom of France; Weimar Army	Holy Roman Empire (Electorate of Bavaria) Bavaria

Commanders and leaders
Bernard of Saxe-Weimar (Kingdom of France) Vicomte de Turenne	(Electorate of Bavaria) Johann von Götzen (Holy Roman Empire) Federico Savelli

Strength
c. 14,000–19,000	c. 3,000–20,000

Casualties and losses
1,700	4,000

The siege of Breisach was fought on 18 August — 17 December 1638 as part of the Thirty Years' War. It ended after several unsuccessful relief attempts by Imperial forces with the surrender of the Imperial garrison to Bernard of Saxe-Weimar, commander of a Protestant army in French service.

== Background ==
The Rhine valley was heavily contested since the beginning of the Eighty Years' War. As part of the Spanish Road, Spain used it to supply troops and goods into the Netherlands. Breisach, part of Habsburg Further Austria, was the principal fortress along the Upper Rhine and considered impregnable because of its topography. The Austrian Habsburgs held the fortress against a first siege by Swedish troops in 1633. Since 1632, France had taken control of the Duchy of Lorraine and established a presence in Alsace, by offering the cities and lordships protection against the warring Swedish and Austrian troops. Control of Breisach would allow France to maintain Alsace and gain entrance into southern Germany.

Bernard of Saxe-Weimar aspired to acquire his own territory in the Holy Roman Empire. After his defeat as Swedish commander at Nördlingen in 1634, he commanded an independent army, the former troops of the Protestant Heilbronn League. A treaty with France brought him reinforcements, pay and provisions. In 1637, he went onto the offensive against Breisach, a potential capital for his desired territory. At Rhinau, he crossed the Rhine but was soon repelled by Imperial troops.

The next year, Bernard renewed his plan, this time with more preparation. He wintered in the Prince-Bishopric of Basel. From there, he planned to strike against the so-called Forest towns (Waldstädte) Rheinfelden, Säckingen, Laufenburg and Waldshut. With them he hoped to secure the Rhine south of Breisach and interrupt supplies from Lake Constance into the fortress.

== Conclusion ==
Bernhard was celebrated by pamphlets as a German Achilles for capturing the Porta Germaniae for the French king Louis XIII. According to historian Peter H. Wilson, Bernhard had rather closed a potential door into France than opened one into Germany. The Habsburg lost their connection to Alsace. This helped to secure French control over the region and isolated the Franche-Comté. The Comtois resistance against France had to continue without Imperial or Spanish support.

== Sources ==
- Ackermann, Astrid (2023). Herzog Bernhard von Weimar: Militärunternehmer und politischer Stratege im Dreißigjährigen Krieg (in German). De Gruyter. ISBN 978-3-1107-0191-3.
- Wilson, Peter H. (2009). Europe's Tragedy: A History of the Thirty Years War. Allen Lane. ISBN 978-0-7139-9592-3.
