= Hessian War =

Drawn out conflict in Germany

Date	1604–1648
Location	Upper Hesse (centre of gravity)
Result	Victory to Hesse-Cassel

Belligerents
Hesse-Cassel (yes) Swedish Empire; France	Hesse-Darmstadt; Holy Roman Empire

Commanders and leaders
Amalie; Mortaigne de Potelles †; Johann von Geyso (Swedish Empire) Gustaf Lewenhaupt	George II; Albrecht von Eberstein (Holy Roman Empire) Graf von Holzappel (Holy Roman Empire) Archduke Leopold Wilhelm

The Hessian War (German: Hessenkrieg), in its wider sense sometimes also called the Hessian Wars (Hessenkriege), was a drawn-out conflict that took place between 1604 and 1648, sometimes pursued through diplomatic means, sometimes by military force, between branches of the princely House of Hesse, particularly between the Landgraviate of Hesse-Cassel and the Landgraviate of Hesse-Darmstadt. It goes back to a division of inheritance following the death of the last landgrave of all Hesse, Philip I in 1567.

The conflict began when the line of Hesse-Marburg died out in 1604. It escalated during Thirty Years' War. After a first settlement in the 1627 Hauptakkord, direct war between Hesse-Cassel and Hesse-Darmstadt broke out 1645 in the Hessian War proper. This open warfare began with the Siege of Marburg in 1645 and ended in April 1648 (but before the Treaty of Westphalia which was concluded later that year and ended the Thirty Years' War) with victory going to Hesse-Cassel. In the peace treaty, Hesse-Cassel received a quarter of Hesse-Marburg with the city of Marburg, while the rest remained with Hesse-Darmstadt.

During the Thirty Years' War, Calvinist Hesse-Cassel joined the alliance between Protestant Sweden and Catholic France, whilst despite its Lutheran beliefs, Hesse-Darmstadt, sided with the Emperor. In the course of the war, Hessian mercenaries fought both in the main Hessian lands as well as in Westphalia (Prince-Bishopric of Münster and Paderborn), in Upper Guelders, on the Lower Rhine (Electorate of Cologne), in the Duchy of Brunswick and other places.

This conflict should not be confused with the campaign by Landgrave Philip I of Hesse, supported by Prince-Elector John of Saxony against the two Franconian prince-bishoprics of Würzburg and Bamberg in 1528, which is also referred to as the "Hessian War".

== Overview of the belligerents ==
Landgraviate of Hesse
Philip I "The Magnanimous" (1504–1567)
Hesse-Cassel; Lower Principality of Hesse (Lower Hesse, today North Hesse) = ca. 50%	Hesse-Marburg; Upper Principality of Hesse (Upper Hesse, today Middle Hesse) = ca. 25%	Hesse-Rheinfels; Lower County of Katzenelnbogen (today part of Rhineland-Palatinate) = ca. 15%	Hesse-Darmstadt; Upper County of Katzenelnbogen (today South Hesse) = ca. 10%
William IV (1532–1592)	Louis IV (1537–1604) †† Line extinguished	Philip II (1541–1583) †† Line extinguished	George I (1547–1596)
Maurice (1572–1632) abdicated 1627	Louis V (1577–1626)
William V (1602–1637) ∞ Amalie Elisabeth	George II (1605–1661)

=== Prelude: The Hessian inheritance division ===
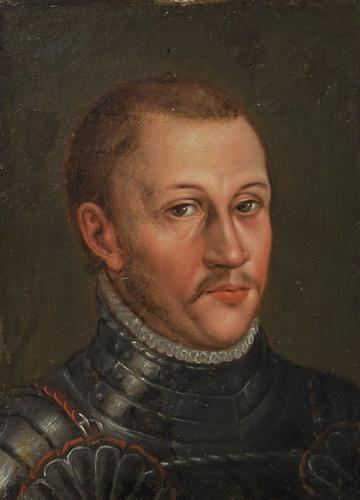
Philip I, the last landgrave of all Hesse (died 1567)

The background of the conflict was the division of inheritance following the death of Phillip the Magnanimous in 1567. According to an old house law in the House of Hesse, he had mandated in his will a division of the landgraviate amongst his four sons, whereby the inheritance of Hessian territory was as follows:

1. His eldest son, William, was given the Lower Principality in the north of Hesse (subsequently referred to as Hesse-Cassel) with the city of Kassel, in all about half of the territory of Hesse.
2. His second son, Louis, was given Upper Hesse in the centre of Hesse (subsequently referred to as Hesse-Marburg) with the town of Marburg and the fortress of Giessen, about a quarter of Hesse itself.
3. His third son, Philip (the Younger), was given the Lower County of Katzenelnbogen in the west of Hesse (subsequently referred to as Hesse-Rheinfels) with Rheinfels Castle and Katzenelnbogen, roughly just over one eight of the territory of Hesse.
4. His youngest son, George, was given the Upper County of Katzenelnbogen in the south of Hesse (subsequently referred to as Hesse-Darmstadt) with the town of Darmstadt, rather less than an eighth of Hesse.

When the Rheinfels line died out in 1583 Hessen-Rheinfels was divided amongst the three remaining brothers of Philip II.

=== The dispute over the Marburg inheritance and the Thirty Years' War ===
==== Marburg Inheritance Dispute (from 1604) ====
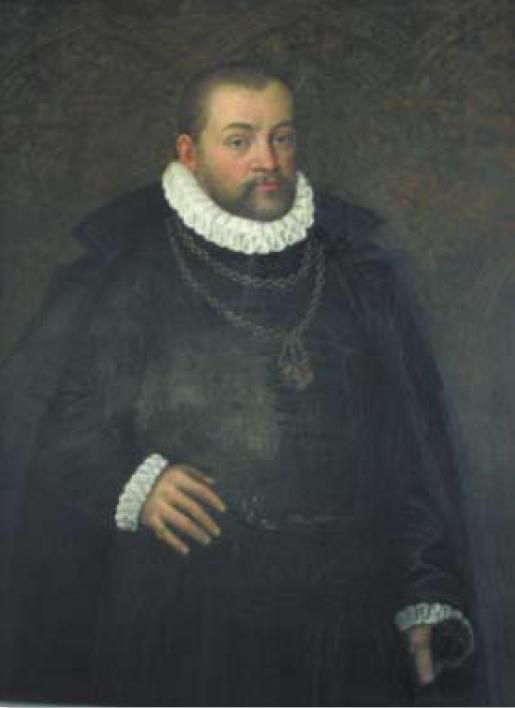
Louis IV, the only landgrave of Hesse-Marburg (line died out in 1604)

In 1604, Landgrave Louis IV of Hesse-Marburg died without issue at his castle in Marburg. His will envisaged that Hesse-Marburg would be divided equally between the sons of his late brothers, William in Cassel and George in Darmstadt, on the condition, that the whole of Hesse-Marburg continued to follow the Lutheran confession.

There was initially a dispute over whether each of the two remaining lines of the family should receive exactly half the territory or whether it should be split according to the number of nephews in each case. Darmstadt would have benefited from the latter interpretation, because George of Hesse-Darmstadt had produced more sons (Louis, Philip (III) and Frederick) than William of Hesse-Cassel with just one heir, Maurice. Following an action for annulment by Hesse-Darmstadt, the matter was decided in favour of Hesse-Cassel by the Aulic Council (Reichshofrat), and Hesse-Marburg was divided in half.

In 1605, the dispute over the Marburg inheritance flared up again after Landgrave Maurice of Hesse-Cassel, whose beliefs since his accession in 1592 increasingly moved towards the Calvinistic confession of his wife, Juliane of Nassau-Siegen, enacted several Calvinist-oriented laws in his domain and in the same year, converted to Calvinism himself. In the wake of this, many Lutheran priests moved to Hesse-Darmstadt and the Lutheran theologians of the University of Marburg went to the gymnasium illustre in Giessen, which, in 1607 also achieved the status of a university. Because, Maurice, by his conversion to Calvinism had ended the Lutheran unity of Hesse-Marburg, he fell foul of the will of his uncle, thus forfeiting his claim to his portion of Hesse-Marburg in the view of Hesse-Darmstadt. Darmstadt was at this point in time neither politically nor militarily strong enough to be able to pursue its claim to the whole of Hesse-Marburg.

==== The rise of Hesse-Darmstadt to the Hauptakkord (1618–1627) ====
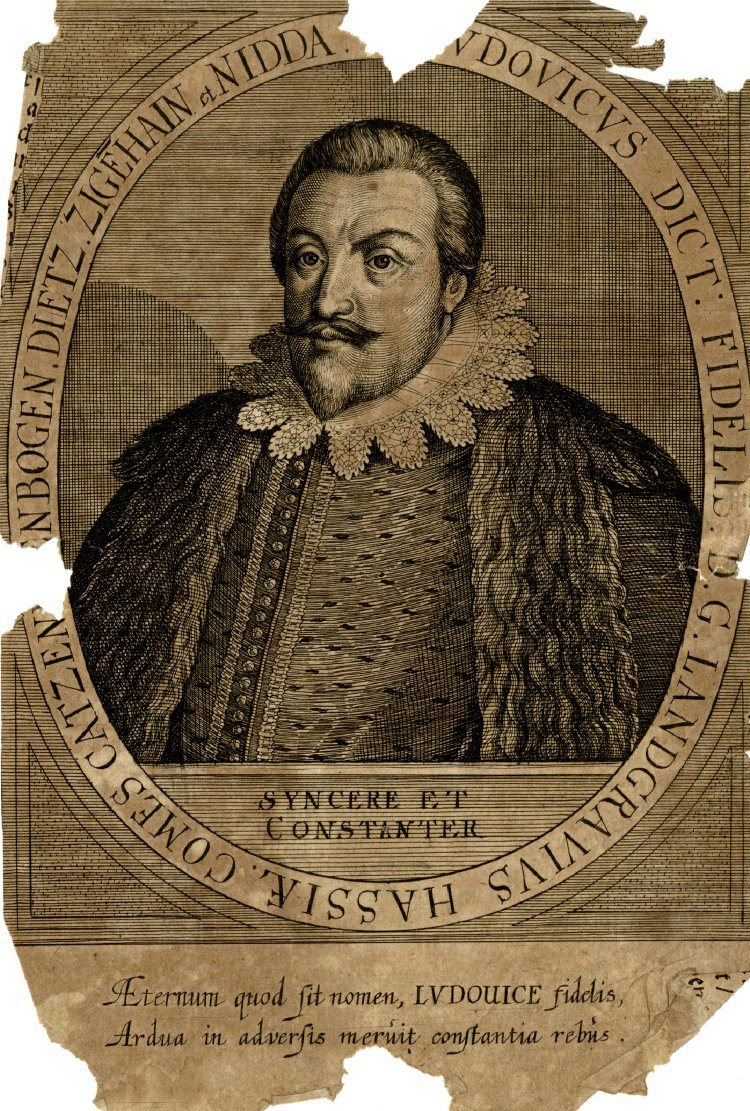
Louis V of Hesse-Darmstadt (died 1626)

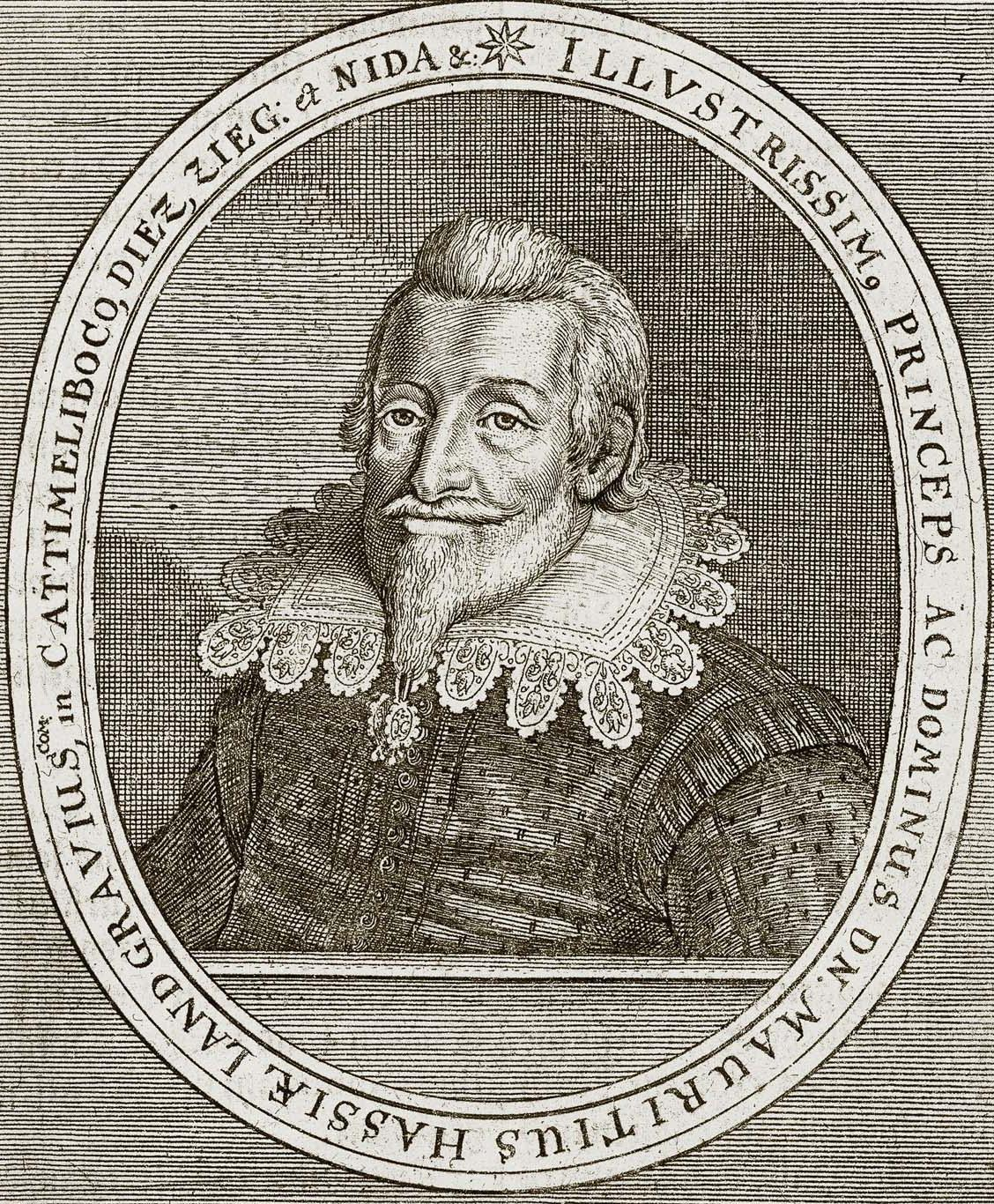
Maurice of Hesse-Cassel (abdicated in 1627)

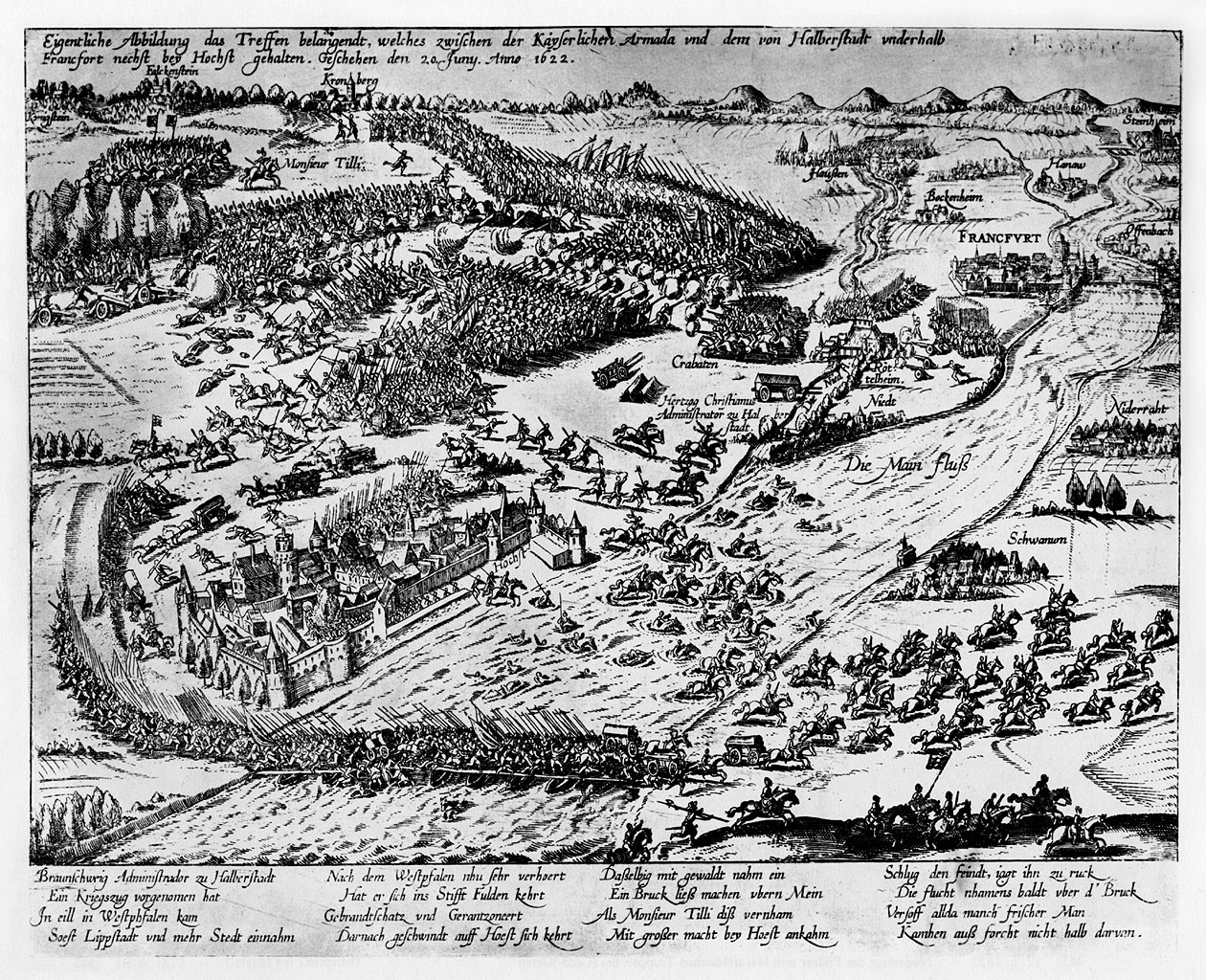
Battle of Höchst (1622)

During the Thirty Years' War, or more precisely the Palatinate campaign, Louis V of Hesse-Darmstadt initially remained neutral but, despite the fact that his state embraced the Lutheran confession, he increasingly sided with the Roman Catholic emperor, whilst the Calvinist Hesse-Cassel fought with the Protestant Union. After the Protestant Duke Christian of Brunswick-Wolfenbüttel had invaded Upper Hesse in 1621, Louis V openly allied himself with the emperor in the hope of receiving military support.

The gamble paid off in the medium term: in 1621 the imperial Field Marshal Ambrosio Spinola occupied the Wetterau. In reply, the commander of the Protestant army, Ernst von Mansfeld, counter-attacked the Darmstadt upper county on orders of Prince-Elector Frederick of the Palatinate. In doing so, he succeeded in taking Louis V of Hesse-Darmstadt and his son, John, prisoner. In exchange for the release of the hostages, he was given the fortress of Rüsselsheim.

During his withdrawal from Russelsheim, however, Mansfeld was defeated on 10 June 1622 in the battle on the Lorsch Heath by imperial general, Tilly. A few weeks earlier, on 27 April 1622 in the Battle of Mingolsheim, Mansfeld had triumphed against Tilly, but achieved no great advantage from his victory. In the meantime, Tilly had grown in strength following his victory at the Battle of Wimpfen on 6 May 1622. Tilly defeated Mansfeld on 20 June 1622, as well as Duke Christian of Brunswick-Wolfenbüttel in the Hessian region at Höchst am Main in the Battle of Höchst, as a result of which the Protestant side was significantly weakened. Tilly advanced again against Hesse-Cassel and occupied all of Lower Hesse as far as the city of Cassel. As a result, he enforced the Aulic Council's judgement of 11 April 1623, that the entire heritage of Hesse-Marburg (including all tax revenue from it, retroactively) should go to the Darmstadt line. Tilly also occupied several Lower Hessian offices as a security.

Even the former county of Katzenelenbogen was seized by Darmstadt. Landgrave Louis V died during the campaign. His son, George II, took over the reins of power in Darmstadt and continued the fight against Cassel.

Because of military defeats and abject government by Landgrave Maurice of Hesse-Cassel, the Lower Hess estates openly rebelled against him and forced his abdication in 1627. The House of Cassel also lost Hesse-Rotenburg (the so-called Rotenburger Quart) thanks to Maurice's division of his inheritance. Thus weakened, Maurice's son and heir, William V, was forced to accept the judgment of the Aulic Council in 1623 and cede the disputed territories. On 24 September 1627 a settlement was reached, the so-called Hauptakkord. The whole of Upper Hesse, the Lower County of Katzenelnbogen and the Barony of Schmalkalden, a Hessian exclave in Thuringia, went to Hesse-Darmstadt. In addition, Hesse-Cassel and Hesse-Darmstadt were granted the same level of precedence in the German Empire. In return, Hesse-Cassel was given back the territories in Lower Hesse that had been held as a security.

After the Edict of Restitution of 1629, the Imperial Abbey of Hersfeld, which had been under Lower Hessian rule since 1604, was also taken from Hesse-Cassel.

==== The rise of Hesse-Cassel in the Swedish War (1630–1634) ====
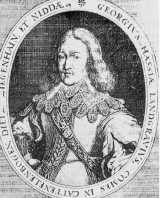
George II of Hesse-Darmstadt

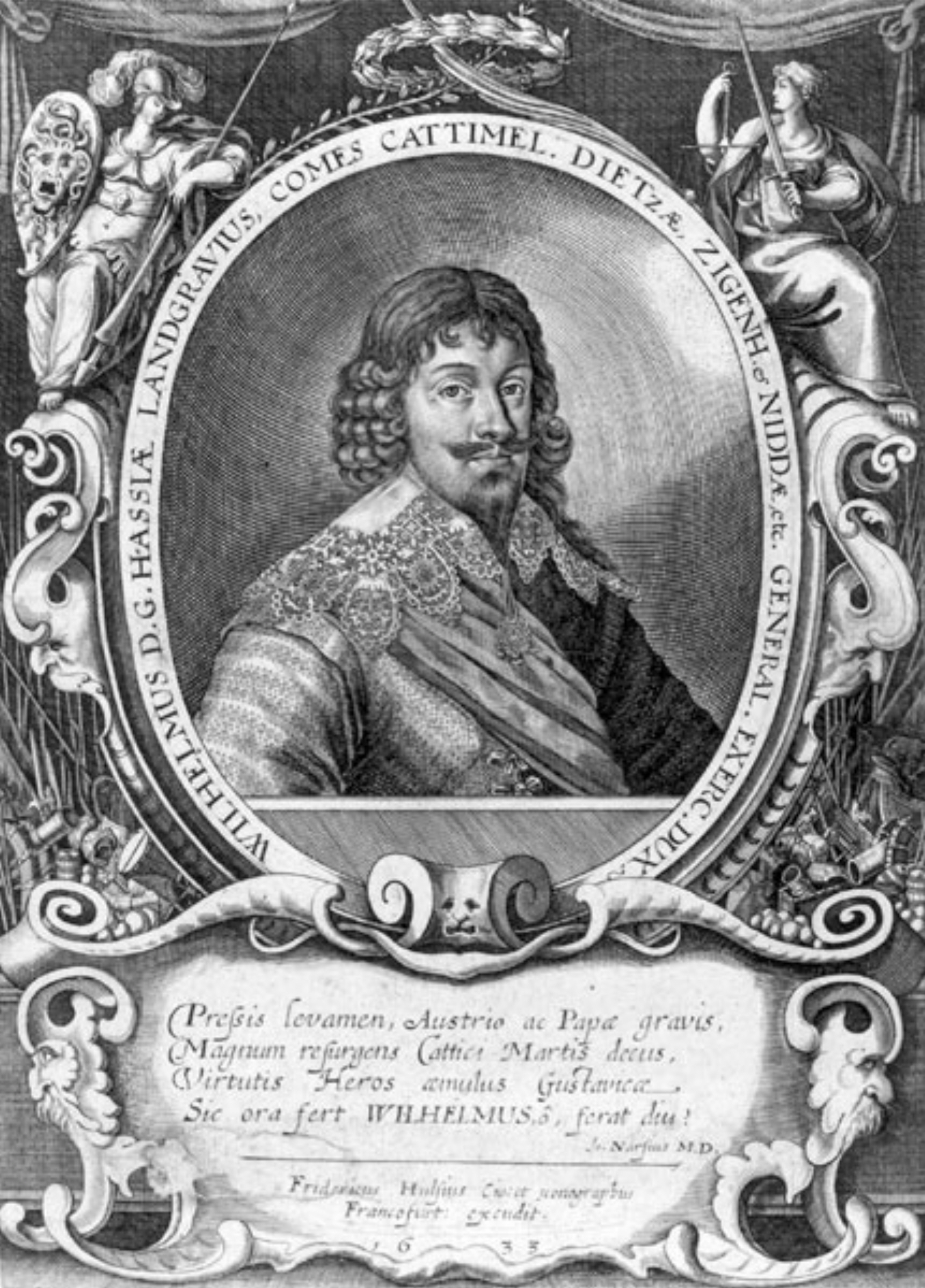
William V of Hesse-Cassel (died 1637)

After the total defeat of the House of Hesse-Cassel had been averted by the Hauptakkord, in 1627 William V began secretly waiver, to build a new mercenary army, under the cover of his apparent renunciation. The turning point for Hesse-Cassel in the Thirty Years' War came in October 1630 when William V became the first German Protestant prince to ally himself with King Gustavus II Adolphus of Sweden (also a great-grandson of Philip I and thus a cousin of William V). After the alliance was formally sealed on 22 August 1631 in the Treaty of Werben (in the wake of the Battle of Werben), Hesse-Cassel placed its army in the service of the Swedish king. In return, Gustavus Adolphus held out the prospect to Cassel that they could expand their territory by conquest.

With the political and military support of the Protestant alliance under the leadership of the Swedish king and thanks to the skillful leadership of William V, who himself went to war as a general, in the period that followed the Lower Hessian troops achieved considerable military success. As a start, they succeeded in driving the imperial occupiers out of Hesse-Cassel. On 24 August 1631, Hersfeld was conquered and, on 9 September 1631, the town of Fritzlar that belonged to the Electorate of Mainz. The imperial troops were further weakened by their defeat in the Battle of Breitenfeld and came under pressure. By mounting diversionary attacks on Mainz positions in the Taunus, Hesse-Cassel supported the Swedish advance on Erfurt, Würzburg and Hanau to Frankfurt and Mainz.

The hopes of Lower Hesse to recover their lost territories in Upper Hesse, as a reward for their support of Sweden, were not, however, fulfilled. After George II of Hesse-Darmstadt had concluded negotiations with the Swedish king, he succeeded in gaining recognition of the neutrality of Hesse-Darmstadt at the Treaty of Höchst on 29 November 1631, in exchange for giving up the fortress of Rüsselsheim, so that Darmstadt was able to keep its territories in Upper Hesse. Instead, on 28 February 1632, Gustavus Adolphus granted Hesse-Cassel several other areas outside of Hesse that the Lower Hessian troops had conquered earlier on Swedish orders (including the Fulda Abbey, the Bishopric of Paderborn and Corvey Abbey) or intended to capture (the Bishopric of Münster, later substituted by the Swedish Chancellor Oxenstierna for parts of the Duchy of Westphalia and Vest Recklinghausen).

==== Advance by the Emperor on Hesse-Cassel from 1634 ====
After the Battle of Lützen in November 1632, in which the Swedish-Protestant side suffered great losses and King Gustavus Adolphus was killed, the fortunes of war turned against the Protestants, including Hesse-Cassel. Following their defeat in the Battle of Nördlingen in September 1634 the Protestant Alliance crumbled. The Calvinist Hesse-Cassel could not comply with the Treaty of Prague of 1635 as a result of excessive demands from Darmstadt, which insisted on the annexation of the whole of Hesse-Cassel. Later it fought once again on the Swedish and French side against the Emperor and the Imperial Princes because of the uncompromising politics of the imperial court. On the opposing side, Hesse-Darmstadt had given up its neutrality and fought openly again for the Emperor. Both sides scored successes. For example, Darmstadt won the County of Isenburg-Büdingen and the Electoral Palatine Amt of Caub. On 13 June 1636, Cassel ended a nine-month blockade of the fortress of Hanau with a victory over the imperial army commander, Lamboy. But neither side won a decisive victory.

In response to his victory over the imperial troops in Hanau and his alliance with France, William V of Hesse-Cassel was outlawed on 19 August 1636 by the electors at Regensburg. His adversary from Darmstadt was appointed administrator over all of Hesse. However, because of the military stalemate, the ban was initially ineffective.

Because even after more than two decades, no end to the confrontation was in sight and the whole of Hesse was suffering badly from the consequences of the war, more so than almost any other region in Germany, in February 1637 the Landstände, or knightly estates, from all parts of Hesse organized a Landtag to seek a mediation between their lords.

But this arbitration parliament was not successful because, in parallel, the newly elected Emperor Ferdinand III, also King of Croatia, had already sent several regiments of Croatian troops to Lower Hesse to the enforce the ban against William V. During their campaign the Croats devastated large parts of Lower Hesse and also threatened to take Cassel. In this situation, William V fled with his family and a large part of his army to East Frisia, where he was granted refuge by Ulrich II of East Frisia following mediation by the states-general. There, in the encampment at Leer, he died from disease on 21 September 1637.

==== Resurgence of Hesse-Cassel in the Swedish-French War (from 1637) and the Hessian War at the Lower Rhine ====
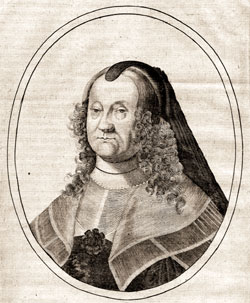
Amalie Elisabeth, regent of Hesse-Cassel in 1637

Because William's son, William VI was only eight years old at the time of his father's death, William V appointed his wife Amalie Elisabeth in his will as a guardian for his under-age heir and thus as regent of Hesse-Cassel. In a coup, she had the Emperor and Darmstadt pay homage to her infant son who was not subject to the ban. Elisabeth Amalie proved a skilful tactician, who succeeded in spite of her extremely difficult starting position in consolidating the position of Hesse-Cassel. First she agreed an apparent truce with the Emperor and so kept Cassel from being conquered by the Imperial Croatian forces. Then she built a powerful army again based on the cadre of troops that her husband had taken to Frisia. Furthermore, in 1639 at Dorsten, she concluded an alliance with France, represented by Cardinal Richelieu, and Sweden.

In 1639, with her new allies behind her, Amalie Elisabeth's troops moved in greater strength against the Electorate of Cologne in order to defend the already conquered electoral territories (promised by Sweden in return for giving up Upper Hesse), especially in the area of Vest Recklinghausen, and to capture other domains besides. In 1641 Hesse-Cassel lost the town of Dorsten in Vest Recklinghausen, which they had seized in 1633, to troops of the Imperial Army and Electorate of Cologne after a siege lasting several weeks. This was the most important Hessian position on the right bank of Lower Rhine. But after the imperial forces partially withdrew to fight in other regions (especially Wolfenbüttel), Hesse-Kassel embarked on a campaign in the electoral lands on the left bank of the Rhine. At the Battle of Kempen Hesse-Cassel, with the support of French-Weimaran troops, dealt the Imperial forces a heavy defeat. In the wake of this defeat, large areas in the north of the Electorate, and even parts of the neutral Duchy of Jülich fell under the occupation of Hesse-Cassel.

=== Decision: Hessian War 1645–1648 ===
Inspired by military and diplomatic successes in the Rhineland and Westphalia, Landgravine Amalia Elisabeth of Hesse-Cassel felt strong enough to take up the fight for the Marburg inheritance in 1644. She had the Hauptakkord treaty of 1627, in which Hesse-Cassel had forfeited Upper Hesse, invalidated by a subsequent legal ruling and, at the end of 1645, sent her battle-hardened troops led by Johann von Geyso towards Marburg. After a short siege of Marburg and Butzbach and their surrender, the majority of Upper Hesse fell again under the rule of Kassel in early 1646.

In 1647, an imperial army under the command of General Melander, who once stood in Cassel service until 1640, succeeded in recovering the town of Marburg - but not its castle. But because the town of Darmstadt and the Upper County was attacked in turn by French troops under the command of Marshal Turenne shortly thereafter, this success was short-lived. By the end of 1647, troops from Cassel had re-occupied the majority of Lower and Upper Hesse and the Lower County of Katzenelnbogen. In early 1648, Melander's troops withdrew from Marburg.

The Hessian War was finally permanently settled by negotiations, that took place in parallel with the Westphalian Peace Congress mediated by Duke Ernest of Saxe-Gotha and which resulted in a unification and peace treaty that was sealed in April 1648, ahead of the Treaty of Westphalia itself. Before the Westphalian Peace Treaty, Cassel fought one last time against the imperial side, winning the Battle of Wevelinghoven in the Rhineland, together with other Protestant troops. Darmstadt, however, was not involved in this battle.

Under the Unification Treaty between Cassel and Darmstadt, Upper Hesse was permanently divided. Darmstadt had to give up a significant part of Upper Hesse to Cassel, not least Marburg and other occupied territories, including the Lower County of Katzenelnbogen and the Barony of Schmalkalden.

== See also ==
- War of the Thuringian Succession or Thuringian-Hessian Succession (1247–1264)
- Hessian Fratricidal War (1469–1470)
- War of the Katzenelnbogen Succession (1500–1557) involving Hesse and Nassau-Siegen

== Literature ==
- Kurt Beck (1978), Der hessische Bruderzwist: zwischen Hessen-Kassel u. Hessen-Darmstadt in d. Verhandlungen zum Westfäl. Frieden von 1644 bis 1648 (in German), Kramer, ISBN 9783782902014
- Kurt Beck (1983), "Der Bruderzwist im Hause Hessen", Die Geschichte Hessens (in German), Stuttgart: Konrad Theiss
- Erwin Bettenhäuser (1983), Die Landgrafschaft Hessen-Kassel auf dem Westfälischen Friedenskongress 1644-1648 (in German), Wiesbaden: Wiku
- Günther Engelbert (1959), "Der Hessenkrieg am Niederrhein (1. Teil)", Annalen des Historischen Vereins für den Niederrhein (in German), vol. Heft 161 (1959), pp. 65–113
- Eckhart G. Franz (2005), Das Haus Hessen: Eine europäische Familie (in German), Stuttgart: W. Kohlhammer
- Klaus Malettke (1999), "Frankreich und Hessen-Kassel zur Zeit des Dreissigjährigen Krieges und des Westfälischen Friedens", in Klaus Malettke (ed.), Veröffentlichungen der Historischen Kommission für Hessen: Kleine Schriften (in German), vol. Band 46, Teil 5, Elwert, ISBN 9783770811168
- Friedrich Rehm (1842), Handbuch der Geschichte beider Hessen (in German), Marburg/Leipzig: N. G. Elwert
- Friedrich Uhlhorn; et al. (1966), Geschichtlicher Atlas von Hessen (in German), Hessisches Landesamt für Geschichtliche Landeskunde, archived from the original (Online-Version mit Karten auf uni-marburg.de) on 2012-02-05
- Friedrich Uhlhorn; Fred Schwind (1966), "Die territoriale Entwicklung Hessens 1247 bis 1866" (PDF), Geschichtlicher Atlas von Hessen (in German), Hessisches Landesamt für Geschichtliche Landeskunde, archived from the original (Full text (pdf; 154 kB) at uni-marburg.de) on 2006-05-14
- Hans Heinrich Weber (1935), Der Hessenkrieg : Dissertation zur Erlangung der Doktorwürde … (in German), Selbstverlag (Druck: Münchowsche Universitäts-Druckerei O. Rindt GmbH)
- Kerstin Weiand (2009), Hessen-Kassel und die Reichsverfassung. Ziele und Prioritäten landgräflicher Politik im Dreißigjährigen Krieg : (= Reihe Untersuchungen und Materialien zur Verfassungs- und Landesgeschichte; Band 24) (in German), Marburg, ISBN 978-3-921254-84-4
