= Countess Amalie Elisabeth of Hanau-Münzenberg =

Amalie Elisabeth of Hanau-Münzenberg
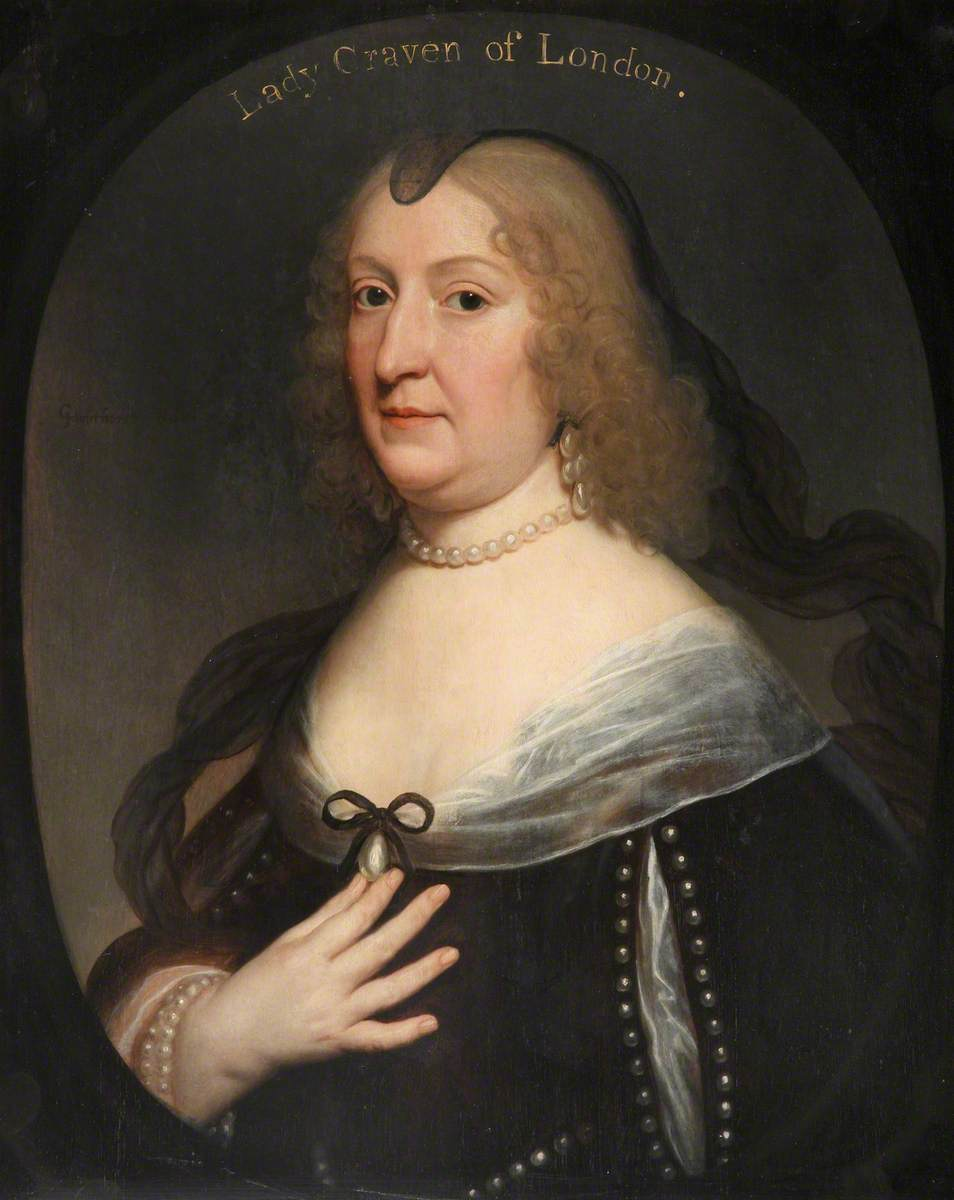
- Portrait by Gerard van Honthorst, 1640

Regent of Hesse-Kassel
- Reign: 21 September 1637 – 5 October 1650
- Monarch: William VI of Hesse-Kassel

Landgravine consort of Hesse-Kassel
- Tenure: 17 March 1627 – 21 September 1637
- Born: 29 January 1602; Hanau, County of Hanau-Münzenberg
- Died: 8 August 1651 (aged 49); Kassel, Hesse-Kassel
- Spouse: William V, Landgrave of Hesse-Kassel (m. 1619; died 1637)
- Issue Among others...: Agnes; Moritz; Elisabeth; Wilhelm; Emilie, Duchess of Thouars; Charlotte, Electress Palatine; William VI, Landgrave of Hesse-Kassel; Philipp; Adolf; Karl; Susanna Elisabeth, Princess-Abbess of Herford; Luise
- House: House of Hanau
- Father: Philip Louis II of Hanau-Münzenberg
- Mother: Countess Catharina Belgica of Nassau
- Religion: Calvinism

Amalie Elisabeth of Hanau-Münzenberg (28 January 1602– 18 August 1651) was Landgravine consort and Regent of Hesse-Kassel. She married the future William V, Landgrave of Hesse-Kassel in 1619 and became Landgravine upon his ascension to power in 1627. In 1637, military defeats forced her and William V into exile in East Frisia. Later that year, she became regent for their son William VI upon her husband's death. Through skillful diplomacy and military successes in the Thirty Years' War, she advanced the fortunes of Hesse-Kassel and influenced the Peace of Westphalia that brought the conflict to an end. She handed over an enlarged landgraviate to her son when she abdicated upon his majority in 1650. However, her health had deteriorated over the course of the war, and she died soon after her abdication in 1651.

== Early life ==
Amalie Elisabeth was born between 2 and 3 o'clock in the afternoon of 28 January 1602 to Philip Louis II, Count of Hanau-Münzenberg and Countess Catharina Belgica of Nassau. Her mother was a daughter of William the Silent, making Amalie Elisabeth the niece of her contemporary Frederick Henry, Prince of Orange. Through her mother's numerous siblings, Amalie Elisabeth was also related to many of the other noble houses of Europe. These included the Reformation-minded Wittelsbachs in Heidelberg, where she lived for a while with her aunt, Countess Louise Juliana of Nassau, and her husband Frederick IV, Elector Palatine. After the early death of her father in 1612, she returned to Hanau. She later stayed with her relatives in the Netherlands.

In 1618, when Amalie Elisabeth was 16, the Defenestration of Prague triggered a revolt in Bohemia, beginning the conflict that would come to be known as the Thirty Years’ War. At the time she was engaged to Albrecht Jan Smiřický von Smiřice, one of the six Bohemian nobles at the Defenestration of Prague who threw the Emperor's representative from a window. However, Albrecht Johann Smiřický died later that year, before the couple could be married. There was a quarrel between Amalie Elisabeth and his heirs over his inheritance, which came to an end when the Habsburgs confiscated it in 1621. Soon after the death of Albrecht Johann Smiřický, Amalie Elisabeth was engaged to William of Hesse-Kassel. This betrothal was part of a larger effort by William’s father Maurice, Landgrave of Hesse-Kassel, to build alliances with other anti-Habsburg states.

== Landgravine ==
The 17-year-old Amalie Elisabeth married William of Hesse-Kassel in 1619. They had their first child, Agnes, in 1620 and would go on to have 14 children together in just 17 years, although only four of their children lived to adulthood. During the first years of their marriage, William’s father Landgrave Maurice was facing serious internal and external challenges to his authority. Many of these challenges would remain unresolved until Amalie Elisabeth became regent.

In 1604, the ruling family of the Landgraviate of Hesse-Marburg had died out, and the will of its last Landgrave stipulated that its territory should be divided between Landgrave Maurice of Hesse-Kassel and Louis V, Landgrave of Hesse-Darmstadt, provided they both agreed to preserve the Lutheran faith. However, in 1603 Maurice had converted to Calvinism and he later attempted to convert his half of the Marburg inheritance to his new faith. Louis V, a devout Lutheran, thus challenged Maurice’s right to the inheritance, taking the case to the Aulic Council. Maurice had little reason to think the court would find in his favor, as Calvinism was not one of the legally recognized religions of the Empire. He began forming alliances with anti-Habsburg states, joining the Protestant Union in 1609. In 1623, the Aulic Council ruled in favor of Louis V and awarded Hesse-Darmstadt the entire inheritance and further financial reparations. In 1624 Louis V, who had established connections with the Catholic League, moved to enforce his claim, with Imperial General Tilly occupying Marburg and southern Hesse-Kassel. Landgrave Maurice tried desperately to raise a force to expel Tilly and prevent the annexation, but he was opposed from within Hesse-Kassel by the Landgraviate’s estates, composed of representatives from the local towns and nobility. No new taxes could be levied without the approval of the estates, and because they opposed Maurice’s foreign policy goals they prevented him from raising an army. After years of fruitless struggle, in 1627 the estates forced Maurice to abdicate to his son William. William now became Landgrave William V, with Amalie Elisabeth as his Landgravine.

From the beginning of his reign, William V desired to reverse the humiliating settlement forced on Hesse-Kassel by the Emperor and the Landgrave of Hesse-Darmstadt. His anti-Imperial sentiments were further enflamed by the issuing of the Edict of Restitution in 1629, which strengthened Imperial authority and directly threatened his religion. In 1630, when Gustavus Adolphus of Sweden invaded to oppose the Emperor, William V became the first German prince to officially ally with Sweden. Initially, the war went well for the allies, with William V and the Swedes achieving many victories. As the war continued William V began to receive subsidies from France. The allies also eventually occupied several territories in Westphalia, which Gustavus Adolphus granted to William V in lieu of subsidies. These subsidies and territories gave William V an independent source of revenue, preventing the Hessian estates from obstructing his war effort as they had his father’s. When William V was away on military campaigns, Amalie Elisabeth ran affairs in Hesse-Kassel on his behalf.

The Imperial and Spanish troops' victory against Sweden in the 1634 Battle of Nördlingen led many German princes to desert Sweden and sign the Peace of Prague with the Emperor. However, because he was excluded from the general amnesty and because the Peace of Prague did not protect the rights of Calvinists, William V was one of the few princes who refused to make peace. Instead, he signed an alliance with the French, who now officially joined the war on the side of the Swedes. On the 13th of June 1636 William V liberated the city of Hanau, Amalie Elisabeth’s birthplace, from a siege by Imperial troops. Despite this success the Peace of Prague had decisively shifted the balance of the war in the Emperor’s favor, and military defeats soon left Hesse-Kassel itself under attack by Imperial armies. These defeats forced William V, Amalie Elisabeth, and their 8 year-old son and heir William to withdraw to the territory of East Frisia, which had been recently occupied by William V’s forces. During this flight, William V and Amalie Elisabeth had to leave their young daughters Amelia, Charlotte, Elisabeth and Louise behind in Kassel. William V soon fell ill, and on October 1, 1637, he died in Leer, East Frisia, at age 36. His will named Amalie Elisabeth as regent for their still underage son, now William VI. The most important instrument of power he left his wife was his army, which had been able to flee to Frisia.

== Regency ==
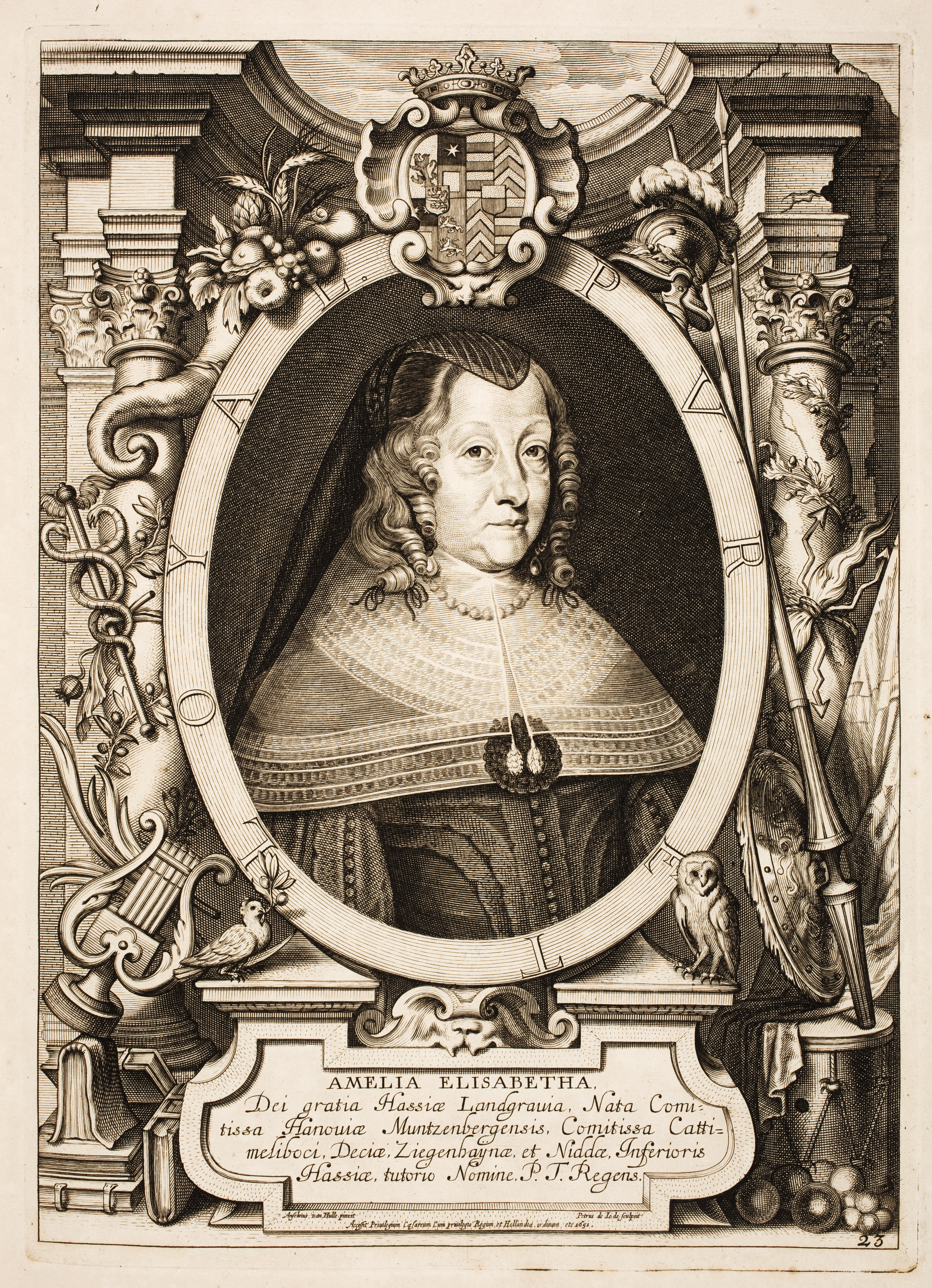
Engraving of Countess Amalie Elisabeth

=== Consolidation of Power ===
William V's will stipulated that Amalie Elisabeth should rule at the head of a regency council composed of the former members of his royal council. However, the Landgravine quickly enforced her own authority and diminished the influence of the other regency council members. She accomplished this by frequently flattering the councilors and shaming them when they did not eagerly obey her. She also physically separated them by sending them on frequent diplomatic missions across Europe. Another tactic she used to great effect was delaying decisions when the councilors pushed her to do things she did not wish to do. She even delayed the official establishment of the regency government, thus leaving the councilors’ authority in question.

Amalie Elisabeth also moved quickly to secure control over her late husband’s army. In 17th century Europe, it was considered highly unusual for a female ruler to hold authority over military matters. As a result, after her ascension both Charles Louis, Prince Palatine, and William V’s half-brother Landgrave Frederick of Hesse-Eschwege asked to be given command of Hesse-Kassel’s armies. Amalie Elisabeth rebuffed both advances, telling the Prince Palatine that he should not approach her while he had no lands, funds, or allies, and forcing Landgrave Frederick to accept her authority. Although she was determined to retain control over the army, she did allow its command to remain in the hands of her late husband’s top general, Peter Melander, Count of Holzappel. Retaining Melander was not without risk, as he was notoriously greedy and self-interested, so his defection was always a possibility. Amalie Elisabeth managed to retain Melander’s loyalty with the help of the French Court, which, fearing Melander’s defection to the Imperialists, offered him generous amounts of money and new titles. One of the Landgravine’s first actions as regent was to order the army and the inhabitants of the territories still under her control to swear an oath of loyalty to her young son William VI, further solidifying her power.

Amalie Elisabeth faced unique threats to her legitimacy because she was a woman. Many in 17th century Europe considered government by women to be unjustifiable under any circumstances, but there were some exceptions. For example, in 1559 John Calvin wrote that “there were occasionally women so endowed, that the singular good qualities which shown forth in them, made it evident that they were raised up by divine authority." Throughout her reign, Amalie Elisabeth asserted that she was one such woman, repeatedly claiming that God had placed her in this position and it was her responsibility to carry out his will. She also stressed her role as a widow and mother to reinforce her legitimacy, refusing any course of action which would violate her late husband’s intent or compromise her son’s inheritance.

Amalie Elisabeth also continued her husband’s efforts to limit the power of the Hessian estates. Because she retained the territories occupied by her husband and eventually renegotiated subsidies from the French, she maintained sources of revenue independent of the estates. As a result, she was able to overlook the estates’ hostility towards her government and rebuff their repeated calls for peace. She was also able to dismiss the grievances of the estates when they were presented to her upon her return to Hesse-Kassel.

=== Diplomacy ===
Amalie Elisabeth inherited a desperate situation from her husband. Although she held East Frisia and other territories in Westphalia, the countryside of Hesse-Kassel was under Imperial occupation and its fortresses were under siege. The situation deteriorated further in late October 1637, when Landgrave George II of Hesse-Darmstadt, son of Landgrave Louis V, announced that the Emperor had declared the late William V an enemy of the Empire, annulled his will, and appointed George II as imperial administrator of Hesse-Kassel. The situation within Hesse-Kassel was so desperate that Amalie Elisabeth’s councilors and the Hessian estates opened negotiations with George II at Marburg and urged the Landgravine to accept whatever terms were necessary to achieve peace. However, George II refused to offer any concessions and demanded Hesse-Kassel’s unconditional submission to the Emperor. He also demanded very harsh terms for his own benefit, such as further territorial concessions to Hesse-Darmstadt, control over her regency government, and that the Hesse-Darmstadt line supplant Hesse-Kassel’s as the senior Hessian house. Amalie Elisabeth concluded that the terms were intolerable and unjust and repeatedly refused to ratify the agreement, against the advice of her councilors.

Events soon vindicated her repeated refusals to make peace, as in 1638 the French and Swedish armies, along with Bernhard of Saxe-Weimar, defeated and captured an Imperial army at the Battle of Rheinfelden. This victory allowed Hessian General Peter Melander to successfully negotiate a cease-fire with the Imperial forces in the region. With her position quickly improving, Amalie Elisabeth sought a better settlement than the terms offered by Landgrave George II. To this end she and her councilors appealed to the other German princes, arguing that George II’s stubbornness and unreasonable demands were preventing a settlement from being reached. As more princes were convinced by this argument, and as the French and Swedish continued to gain momentum, the Emperor decided to revoke George II’s authority over the negotiations and appointed the Elector of Mainz to conclude the treaty. The Elector of Mainz was one of the princes whose lands in Westphalia were occupied by Amalie Elisabeth’s forces, so he sought to make peace as quickly as possible. The Elector offered more generous terms, including no further territorial or political concessions to Hesse-Darmstadt and official recognition of the right of all Calvinist princes to practice their religion. Amalie Elisabeth was delighted by these terms and agreed to ratify the treaty. The Emperor, however, refused to ratify it, as the legalization of Calvinism was not a concession he was willing to accept.

While she was negotiating with the Emperor for a separate peace, Amalie Elisabeth also negotiated with France. After the death of William V, the French feared that Amalie Elisabeth’s regency was unstable and could collapse, so they halted all subsidy payments to Hesse-Kassel. Although French agents had since reported that the Landgravine had a firm grip on power, by early 1639 the subsidy payments had still not resumed. She thus requested that the subsidies be renewed and increased and that the alliance between France and Hesse-Kassel be restored. In the ensuing negotiations, Amalie Elisabeth used her gender to her advantage by portraying herself as an unfortunate widow faced with a desperate situation and in dire need of help from the French court. She also stressed Hesse-Kassel’s importance to the allied cause, claiming that if she were to fall France and Sweden would not be able to defeat the Emperor. In addition to these tactics, she strengthened her negotiating position by making her negotiations for peace with the Emperor public, signaling to the French that she would make a separate peace if they did not agree to her terms. The French eventually agreed to her demands, and in August 1639 they signed the Treaty of Dorsten, renewing the alliance and granting her a greater subsidy than her husband had received. Over the next decade of war, the alliance between France and Hesse-Kassel would remain firm, and Amalie Elisabeth would maintain amicable ties with the French court. Her efforts also earned her the admiration of the First Minister of France, Cardinal Richelieu, who wrote in 1637 that the Landgravine “defended herself with courage, not least by the force, as by the justice of her cause."

=== Thirty Years' War ===
After renewing Hesse-Kassel’s alliance with France, Amalie Elisabeth rejoined the war on the allied side. She soon agreed to support a joint allied offensive and in 1640 ordered General Peter Melander to link up with the armies of France and Sweden. Melander, however, did not support rejoining the war against the Emperor and strongly objected to serving under the Swedish Field Marshal Johan Banér, who had been given overall command of the allied army. In July 1640 Melander returned to Kassel and offered his resignation. Amalie Elisabeth, having had enough of Melander’s criticisms of her leadership, accepted the resignation. Peter Melander would later become a general in the Imperial army and fight against Hesse-Kassel. Over the remaining course of the war, the Landgravine chose several other men to command her armies, including Count Kaspar von Eberstein (de) and Johann von Geyso.

Amalie Elisabeth remained allied with France and Sweden and committed the army of Hesse-Kassel to their cause until the end of the war. In 1641 Hessian troops fought alongside the French and Swedish armies. Together they won a pyrrhic victory in the Battle of Wolfenbüttel. Later that year, the Swedish attempted to relieve a Hessian force under siege in Dorsten, where Amalie Elisabeth had once held court, but they were too late, and Dorsten fell to Imperial forces in September. In January 1642, Hessian forces assisted the French army under the Comte de Guébriant in winning a decisive victory at the Battle of Kempen, strengthening the allied position along the Rhine. Two Hessian cavalry regiments fought alongside Swedish Field Marshal Lennart Torstensson’s forces at the Second Battle of Breitenfeld in October 1642. The battle was a major victory for the allies, leaving the Habsburg Hereditary lands vulnerable and further turning the tide of the war. Hessian forces were also present at the last battle of the Thirty Years’ War, which took place at Wevelinghoven in 1648. In this battle, the Hessian army under Johann von Geyso defeated an Imperial army under Guillaume de Lamboy.

In addition to committing troops to the major campaigns of the war, Amalie Elisabeth also launched initiatives to increase the size of her children’s inheritance. For example, in 1641 the last count of Hanau-Münzenberg died without a male heir and a succession struggle ensued between many different claimants. Amalie Elisabeth had a great deal of influence in Hanau-Münzenberg because it was the county of her birth, her husband had liberated it from Imperial siege in 1636, and its government owed money to Hesse-Kassel. One claimant, Count Friedrich Casimir of Hanau-Lichtenberg, offered to allow the territory to revert to Hesse-Kassel if his line ever lacked a male heir in exchange for Amalie Elisabeth supporting his claim. She accepted the deal and in 1643 Count Friedrich Casimir won the succession struggle with her help. Thereafter if the Count of Hanau-Lichtenberg ever died without a male heir, Hanau-Münzenberg would belong to Hesse-Kassel, which eventually took place in 1736.

Amalie Elisabeth’s most significant initiative was her campaign to reclaim the Marburg inheritance lost to Hesse-Darmstadt by her late father-in-law. In October 1643, she re-asserted Hesse-Kassel’s claim to the territory, using the opinions of legal experts to show that the 1627 treaty conceding it was both illegal and forced. In 1645, she went a step further by launching an invasion and occupying Marburg and the rest of the disputed territory. This was the start of the Hessenkrieg, or "Hessian War," which would be waged throughout the later stages of the Thirty Years’ War. Initially, the experienced army of Hesse-Kassel was easily able to defeat the meager forces Landgrave George II was able to muster. However, George II requested aid from the Imperialists, and the Emperor and the Elector of Bavaria sent a force under Peter Melander to assist him. Amalie Elisabeth called upon her French and Swedish allies to support her, and the main focus of the war shifted to the conflict in Hesse. In 1647 Melander managed to retake the city of Marburg, but the city’s fortress held out and Melander’s army began to run out of supplies. In December of that year a cannonball from the fortress seriously injured Melander, and in January 1648 his army retreated from the territory. Amalie Elisabeth’s forces re-occupied Marburg, and George II was forced to come to terms. In April of that year, both Hessian houses signed an agreement in which Amalie Elisabeth received most of the disputed territory, including the valuable city of Marburg.

=== Peace of Westphalia ===
In 1642, diplomats laid plans to host a general peace conference between the Emperor, the French and the Swedish in the Westphalian cities of Münster and Osnabrück, although the negotiations would not begin for several more years. Once they began all the princes of the Empire were invited to attend the congress, with Catholic princes joining the French at Münster and Protestant princes going to Osnabrück with the Swedes. Because Amalie Elisabeth was one of the few German princes remaining at war with the Emperor, she sent diplomatic delegations to both Münster and Osnabrück. Throughout the negotiations the Landgravine instructed her diplomats to pursue an uncompromising strategy to achieve her demands. This strategy did not endear her to any of the other princes, as her demands were far more ambitious than they had expected and many thought she was being unreasonable. In addition to negotiating with the princes of the Empire, Amalie Elisabeth also had to repeatedly ensure that her French and Swedish allies would not abandon her demands in favor of their own.

One of Amalie Elisabeth’s most ambitious demands was a formal change in the structure of the Holy Roman Empire. Her husband, the late Landgrave William V, had been a staunch opponent of the Habsburg emperors’ attempts at centralization and believed that every Imperial prince should enjoy the same rights. Amalie Elisabeth thus sought to achieve her husband’s goal of stripping the Emperor and the Electors of their power over the Empire by formalizing an aristocratic interpretation of the Imperial constitution. This goal was also supported by the French, the Swedes, and a few German princes, the most prominent of which was the Elector of Brandenburg. However, these allies were prevented from working together by other disputes. Sweden and Brandenburg both claimed the territory of Pomerania, so the Imperial negotiator mediated the dispute, awarding Sweden half of Pomerania and compensating Brandenburg with lands elsewhere. As a result of this mediation, both parties agreed to drop their demands for changes to the constitution of the Empire. Without their support, Amalie Elisabeth was unable to achieve all of her constitutional goals. Although a complete re-interpretation of the Imperial constitution did not occur, Amalie Elisabeth and her allies did achieve important concessions on this issue. The Peace of Westphalia confirmed that every Imperial Prince had the right to make alliances and take up arms independently.

The most important issue for Amalie Elisabeth was the question of religion. Throughout the conference she repeatedly demanded that Calvinism be given the same legal status within the Empire as Catholicism and Lutheranism. She faced strong opposition on this issue, both from the Emperor’s delegates and from those of the Lutheran princes, who were not inclined to make common cause with their fellow protestants. However, this was not an issue she was willing to compromise on, as she had repeatedly refused to make peace in the past without explicit protections for her religion. Eventually her hardline stance won out, and the delegates agreed to grant Calvinists the same rights enjoyed by Catholics and Lutherans since the Peace of Augsburg.

Amalie Elisabeth also advanced the interests of Hesse-Kassel throughout the conference. She initially demanded territorial concessions from the princes whose lands in Westphalia she occupied. These demands were strongly opposed by many other princes, so she eventually agreed to drop them in exchange for 600,000 Reichsthalers in reparations payments. Although she did not achieve these territorial demands, she did gain recognition of her acquisition of the Marburg inheritance and several smaller territories such as Hersfeld Abbey and parts of the County of Schaumburg. In addition, the Landgravine successfully negotiated an amnesty going back to 1618 for herself and all other princes outside the Habsburg hereditary lands. With the help of Sweden and France, she also secured a compensation payment to demobilize her army, the only German territory to do so. In total Amalie Elisabeth achieved many of her objectives and wielded significant influence on the Peace of Westphalia, despite being the ruler of a minor German state. In the Treaties of Münster and Osnabrück, there are a full 15 paragraphs specifically addressing the affairs of Hesse-Kassel and Amalie Elisabeth.

== Death ==
Amalie Elisabeth’s efforts during the war and the burdens they brought with them had a lasting impact, and her health had steadily deteriorated through the war. In September 1650, she declared her intention to abdicate and transfer power to her son William VI, who had turned 21 earlier that year. On the 5th of October, she held an extravagant abdication ceremony, attended by her advisors and the Hessian estates, at which William VI was officially granted control over the court.

Before her abdication, Amalie Elisabeth had overseen the marriage of her daughter Charlotte to Elector Charles Louis of the Palatinate. In March 1651, she and her daughter Elisabeth traveled to Heidelberg to visit the newly married Electress Charlotte and her husband. While she was there, she suffered a severe bout of rheumatism in her foot and had to have part of it amputated in a painful surgery. Amalie Elisabeth returned to Kassel completely exhausted and with her condition much deteriorated. Four weeks later, on August 8, 1651, Amalie Elisabeth died in her sleep in Kassel. She was buried in the Martinskirche cemetery on September 30.

== Legacy ==
Amalie Elisabeth was remembered fondly among Calvinists for her efforts to preserve the Reformed faith in the Holy Roman Empire. When she visited Heidelberg in 1651, she was praised by the city’s inhabitants, who called her a second Deborah. In his 1901 book Women of the Reformed Church, James Isaac Good calls her both a “Reformed Deborah” and a “Reformed Joan of Arc." Her first biography was likely written by Christian Gottfried Körner and appeared as an appendix to the Representation of the Thirty Years War by Friedrich Schiller. Amalie Elisabeth was one of only four women accepted into King Ludwig I's Walhalla hall of fame during his lifetime (There are twelve women present today). Her bust was carved by Christian Friedrich Tieck.

Although Amalie Elisabeth’s reign was remembered for generations, modern scholarship on the Thirty Years’ War often pays little or no attention to her or her accomplishments. The foremost English-language biography on her is The Iron Princess: Amalia Elizabeth and the Thirty Years' War, written by Dr. Tryntje Helfferich and published in 2013. In her book, Dr. Helfferich argues that Amalie Elisabeth’s role in the Thirty Years’ War has been marginalized in modern works “largely because she was a woman, for her role in the Thirty Years War rivaled that of Bernhard of Saxe-Weimar, Cardinal Mazarin, or even King Gustavus Adolphus of Sweden."

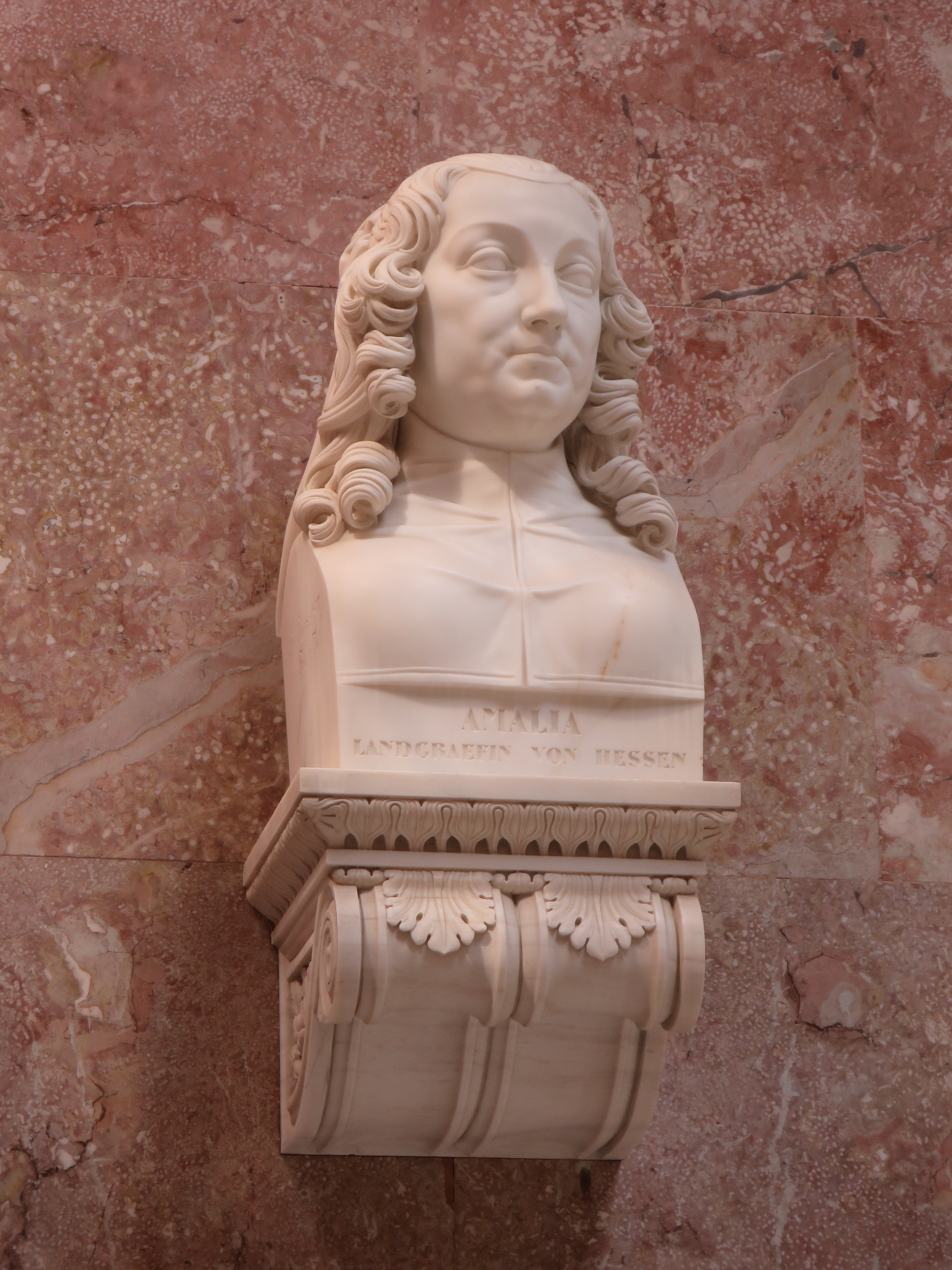
Bust in the Walhalla by Christian Friedrich Tieck

== Issue ==
Amalie Elisabeth was constantly pregnant during her marriage, giving birth almost once a year:

- Agnes (24 November 1620 – 20 August 1626), died in childhood.
- Maurice (born and died 24 September 1621).
- Elisabeth (21 October 1623 – 13 January 1624), died in infancy.
- William (31 January 1625 – 11 July 1626), died in childhood.
- Emilie (11 February 1626 – 15 February 1693), married 15 May 1648 to Henri Charles de La Trémoille.
- Charlotte (20 November 1627 – 16 March 1686), married 12 February 1650 (div. 14 April 1657) to Charles I Louis of the Palatinate.
- William VI, Landgrave of Hesse-Kassel (23 May 1629 – 16 July 1663), married 9 July 1646 to Margravine Hedwig Sophie of Brandenburg.
- Philipp (16 June 1630 – 17 August 1638), died in childhood.
- Adolf (17 December 1631 – 17 March 1632), died in infancy.
- Karl (18/19 June 1633 – 9 March 1635), died in childhood.
- Elisabeth (23 June 1634 – 22 March 1688), Princess-Abbess of Herford.
- Stillbirth (8 February 1635).
- Luise (5 November 1636 – 6 January 1638), died in childhood.
- Stillbirth (28 May 1637).

== Bibliography ==
- Henry Gardiner Adams, ed. (1857). "Amalie, Elizabeth" . A Cyclopaedia of Female Biography: 34–35. Wikidata Q115645103 – via Wikisource.

Countess Amalie Elisabeth of Hanau-Münzenberg House of Hanau Born: 29 January 1602 Died: 8 August 1651
Royal titles
Vacant Title last held by Juliane of Nassau-Siegen	Landgravine of Hesse-Kassel; 1627 – 21 September 1637	Vacant Title next held by Hedwig Sophie of Brandenburg
