= Johann von Geyso =

17th century German nobleman and General

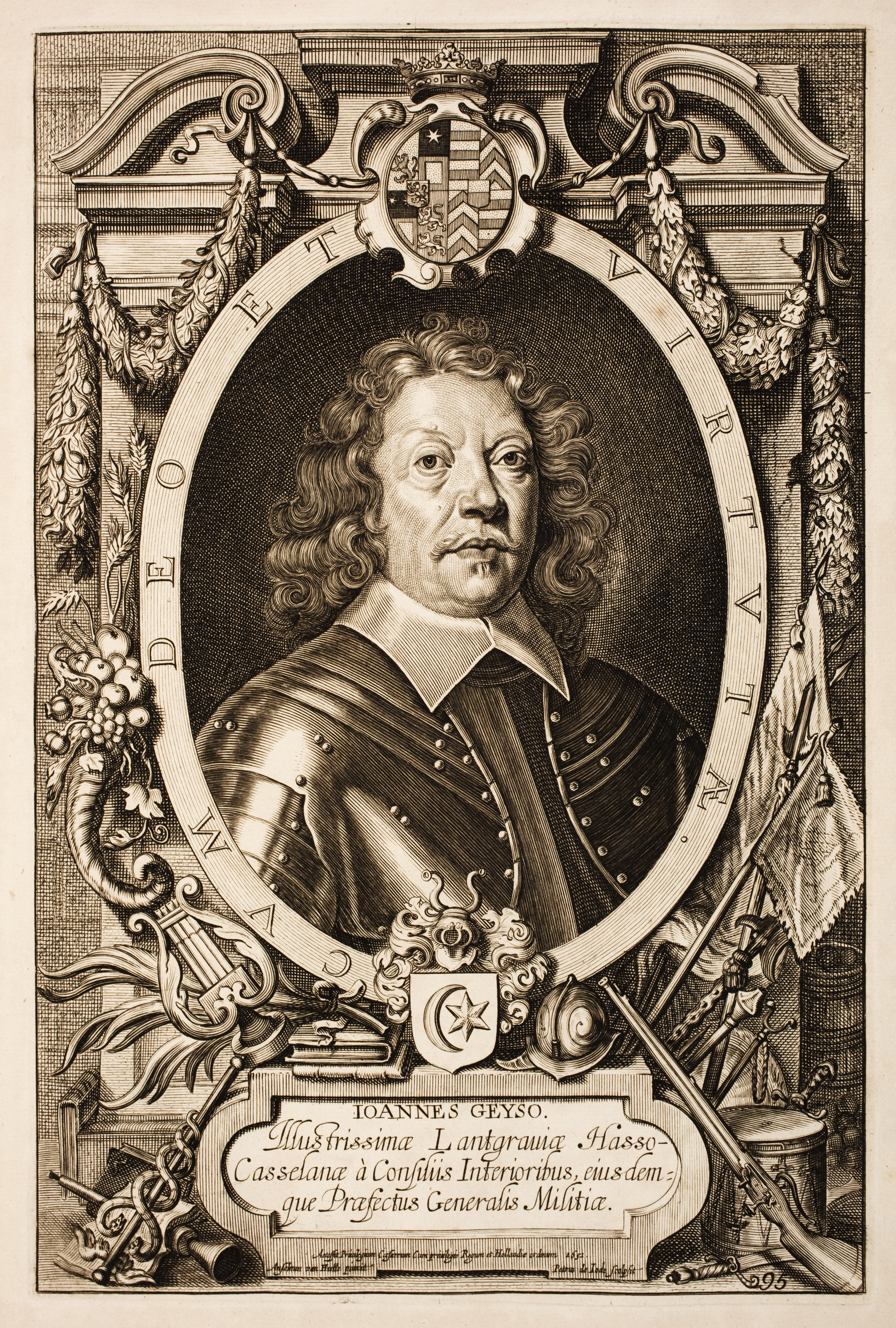
- Johann von Geyso
- Born: 1593; Borken, Holy Roman Empire
- Died: 1661 (aged 67–68)
- Allegiance: (yes) Swedish Empire; Bohemian Estates; Protestant Union; Denmark; Landgraviate of Hesse-Kassel
- Rank: General-Lieutenant
- Conflicts: Ingrian War Polish–Swedish War (1600–29); Thirty Years' War: Battle of White Mountain; Battle of Lutter; Siege of Dorsten; Battle of Nördlingen (1645); Battle of Totenhöhe; Battle of Wevelinghoven; Hessian War

Johann von Geyso (1593 – 1661) was a German nobleman and General-Lieutenant, who fought during the course of the Thirty Years' War. After studying in a Dutch military academy, Geyso fought as a mercenary in the armies of Sweden, Bohemia, Denmark and the German Protestant Union. In 1628, having gained significant experience in warfare he returned to his native Hesse-Kassel which he served until the end of the Thirty Years' War, reaching the rank of commander in chief of the Langraviate's forces and becoming ennobled.

== Biography ==
Geyso was born to a family of commoners in 1593 in Borken, Hesse. At an early age he was sent to a military academy in the Dutch Republic by Maurice, Landgrave of Hesse-Kassel, where he studied the art of war. He then joined a Swedish Banner which fought in the Ingrian War and the Polish–Swedish War (1600–29) against Russia and Poland respectively. He then returned to the Holy Roman Empire, entering the service of rebellious Bohemian Estates who sparked the Thirty Years' War through the Bohemian Revolt. He fought in the Battle of White Mountain, where he commanded a Fähnlein of infantry, while being in the rank of a captain. After the defeat of the Bohemians he continued to fight for the Protestant Union first under Ernst von Mansfeld, then Bernard of Saxe-Weimar as Rittmeister, finally entering the service of Christian IV of Denmark after the latter intervened into the war. In 1628, he fought as a colonel at the Battle of Lutter, where the Danes were defeated. Whereupon Countess Juliane of Hesse-Kassel requested him to return into his homeland, to which he complied. In 1630, Sweden launched its own intervention into the war, reinvigorating the seditious Protestants in the empire. Geyso was appointed quartermaster general, assisting William V, Landgrave of Hesse-Kassel in reorganizing his troops. His next assignment on the field came in 1636 when he defended Paderborn from the combined forces of Johann von Götzen and Gottfried Huyn von Geleen, to whom he had to surrender on 15 August of the same year. In 1637, he supervised the Hessian occupation of Oldersum in East Frisia.

Following the ascension of Countess Amalie Elisabeth to the throne in September 1637, Geyso gains a more prominent role in the Langravate's military campaigns against the rival Landgraviate of Hesse-Darmstadt. In the autumn of 1641, he commanded the defense of Dorsten finally handing it over to Imperial troops on favorable conditions. In 1644, he was summoned by Swedish field marshal Lennart Torstensson who requested his assistance with the encircling of Imperialist Matthias Gallas' army which at the time operated in the vicinity of Magdeburg. Geyso's 2,300 men took part in grueling march through flooded areas, arriving in time to witness the disintegration of the Imperialist army. On 3 August 1645, the courage of the Hessians contributed to the victory at the Battle of Nördlingen (1645).

== Return to Hesse ==
The Hessian War resumed in September 1645, with a failed Kassel attack on Giessen. Kassel claimed that its troops were seeking winter quarters, however little doubt was left about Amalie Elisabeth's intentions after Kassel artillery shelled Marburg a month later. In 1646, Geyso returned to Hesse taking Marburg on 15 January, whose defenders had put a fierce resistance. Darmstadt then hired Ernst Albrecht von Eberstein as their new commander in chief, his counter offensive liberated all lands previously lost to Kassel apart from Marburg. In the meantime, both Kassel and Darmstadt's allies were too preoccupied with other issues, allowing the two to fight the war in relative isolation. On 20 November, Geyso defeated Eberstein in the Battle of Frankenberg forcing Darmstadt into a truce.

In 1647, Geyso presented Countess Amalie Elisabeth with 15 captured enemy flags, despite his past successes the Countess chose Kaspar Kornelius Mortaigne de Potelles over him as the head of the Langraviate's troops. On 10 July 1647, a cannonball crushed Potelles' left leg, gravely wounding him while he was besieging the Rheinfels Castle. In 1648, Geyso replaced Potelles and was promoted from Generalwachtmeister to General-Lieutenant. He advanced to Rhine-Westphalia where he fought against the forces of the Electorate of Cologne commanded by Guillaume de Lamboy. On 14 July, he defeated Lamboy at the Battle of Wevelinghoven, skirmishes between the two continued until the end of the war denying Imperial troops of badly needed reinforcements. After the conclusion of the war Geyso was ennobled and served in the Kassel Landesausschuss. Geyso died in 1661, his brother Ludwig also served in the Kassel military as a captain.
