= Battle of Nördlingen =

The term Battle of Nördlingen refers to two battles during the Thirty Years' War (1618-1648).

- Battle of Nördlingen (1634)
- Battle of Nördlingen (1645)
