= Battle of Totenhöhe =

1646 battle of the Thirty Years' War

- Part of the Thirty Years' War
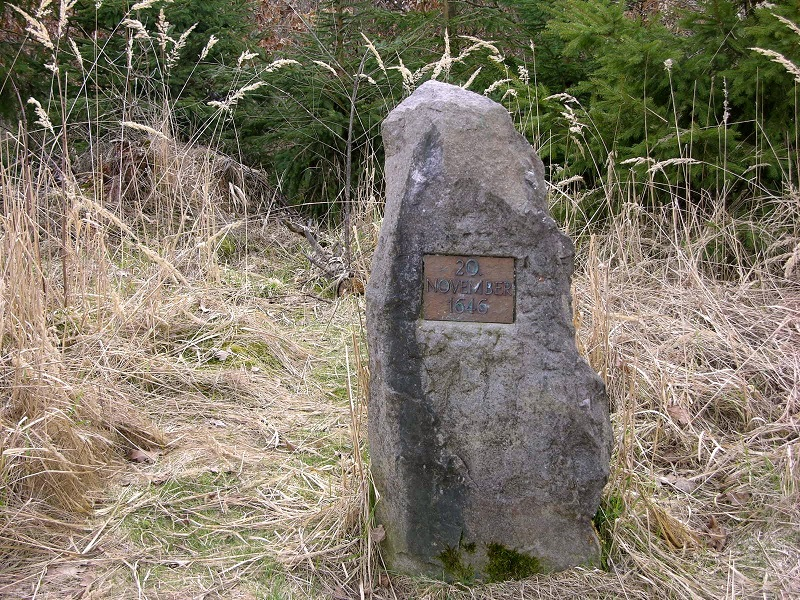
Date	20 November 1646
Location	Totenhöhe, Germany
Result	Swedish–Hessian Victory

Belligerents
Swedish Empire; Hesse-Kassel	Holy Roman Empire; Hesse-Darmstadt

Commanders and leaders
Johann von Geyso; (Swedish Empire) Gustav Adolf Lewenhaupt	Albrecht von Eberstein

Strength
4,000 Hessians (Swedish Empire) 2,000 Swedes	(Holy Roman Empire) 2 regiments (Holy Roman Empire) 800 cavalry

Casualties and losses
	500 killed 800 captured

The Battle of Totenhöhe took place on 20 November 1646 during the Thirty Years' War, in the northwestern part of the town of Totenhöhe in Upper Hesse between Imperial and Hesse-Darmstadt troops on one side, and a Hesse-Kassel-Swedish army on the other. The battle ended in victory for Hesse-Kassel and Sweden.
