= Siege of Dorsten =

1641 battle of the Thirty Years' War

- Part of the Thirty Years' War (Hessian War)
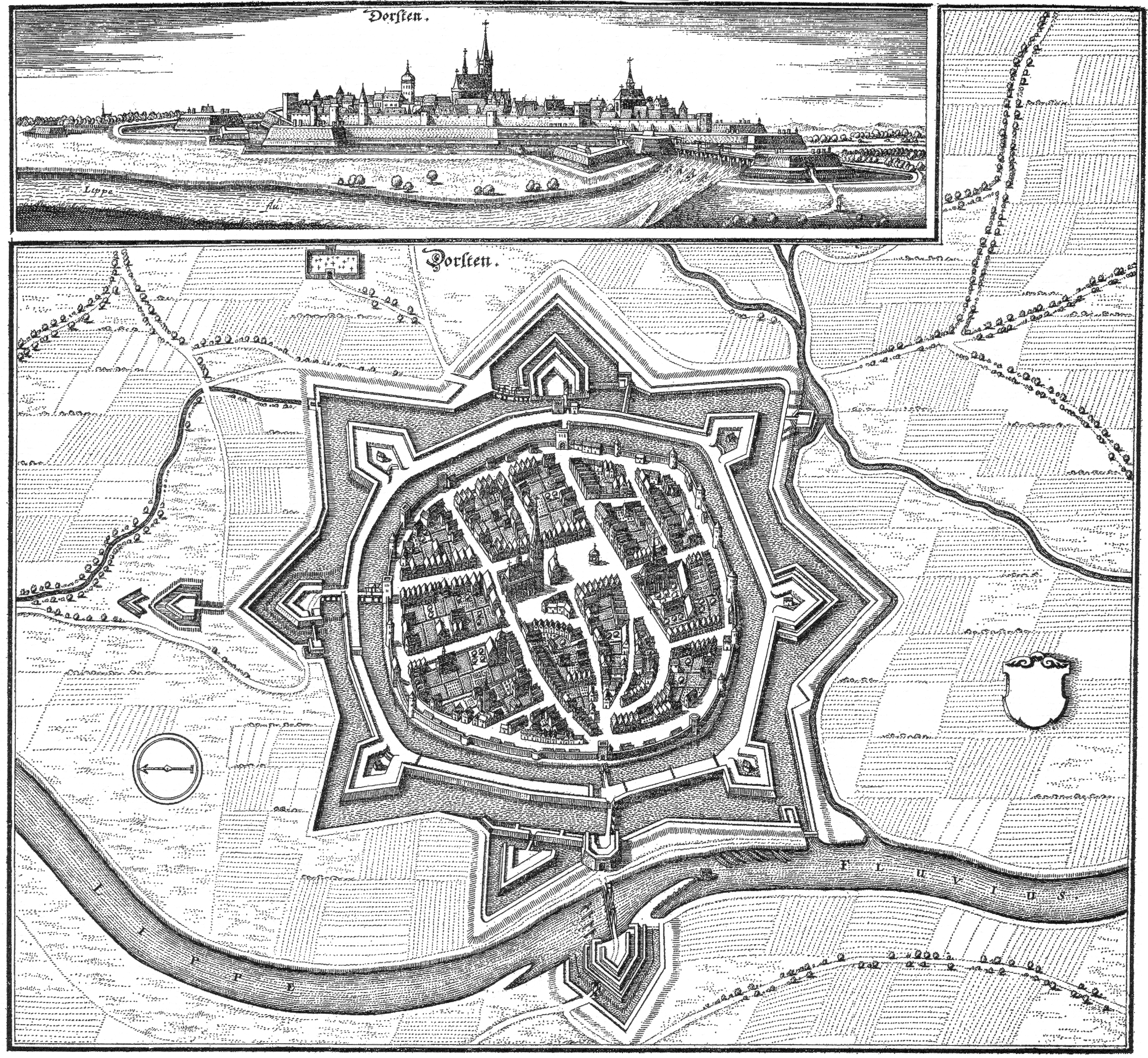
- The Town of Dorsten in 1641 by Matthäus Merian.
Date	16 Jul –19 Sep 1641
Location	Dorsten 51°39′36″N 6°57′51″E
Result	Imperial victory

Belligerents
Hesse-Cassel	Holy Roman Empire

Commanders and leaders
Johann von Geyso (surrendered)	Melchior von Hatzfeldt

Strength
2,000 (infantry, cavalry, artillery), 250 men of the Hessian 1st relief force from Haltern, 2nd relief force incl. 3,000 Swedish cuirassiers withdrawn from Wolfenbüttel (too late for battle)	12 regiments of infantry, 10 regiments of cavalry 30 pieces of heavy artillery)

Casualties and losses
1,350 killed and wounded	Unknown
- Location within North Rhine-Westphalia Dorsten (Germany)

In the siege of Dorsten (German: Belagerung von Dorsten), an Imperial force under Melchior von Hatzfeldt besieged the Hessian garrison in the town of Dorsten from 16 July 1641 to 19 September 1641 during the Thirty Years' War. The garrison capitulated on 18 September 1641 and moved out of the town the following day.

According to a judgement by the Vienna Supreme Court (Wiener Hofgericht), Hesse-Cassel had to cede Upper Hesse, which included the University of Marburg, to Hesse-Darmstadt. In return for this substantial loss, in the Treaty of Werben on 22 August 1631, King Gustavus Adolphus of Sweden promised to grant Hesse-Cassel various territories in Westphalia including parts of the Prince-Bishopric of Münster (Hochstift Münster) and the Vest Recklinghausen (governed by the Electorate of Cologne), if he were victorious in the Thirty Years' War.

On 9 February 1633, Hesse-Cassel captured Dorsten without resistance from the Electorate of Cologne. In the following years, it was turned into the strongest fortress in the region by the Hessian Colonel Dalwig and by Johann Adriansch. A first attempt to recapture it by Johann von Götz failed in 1636.

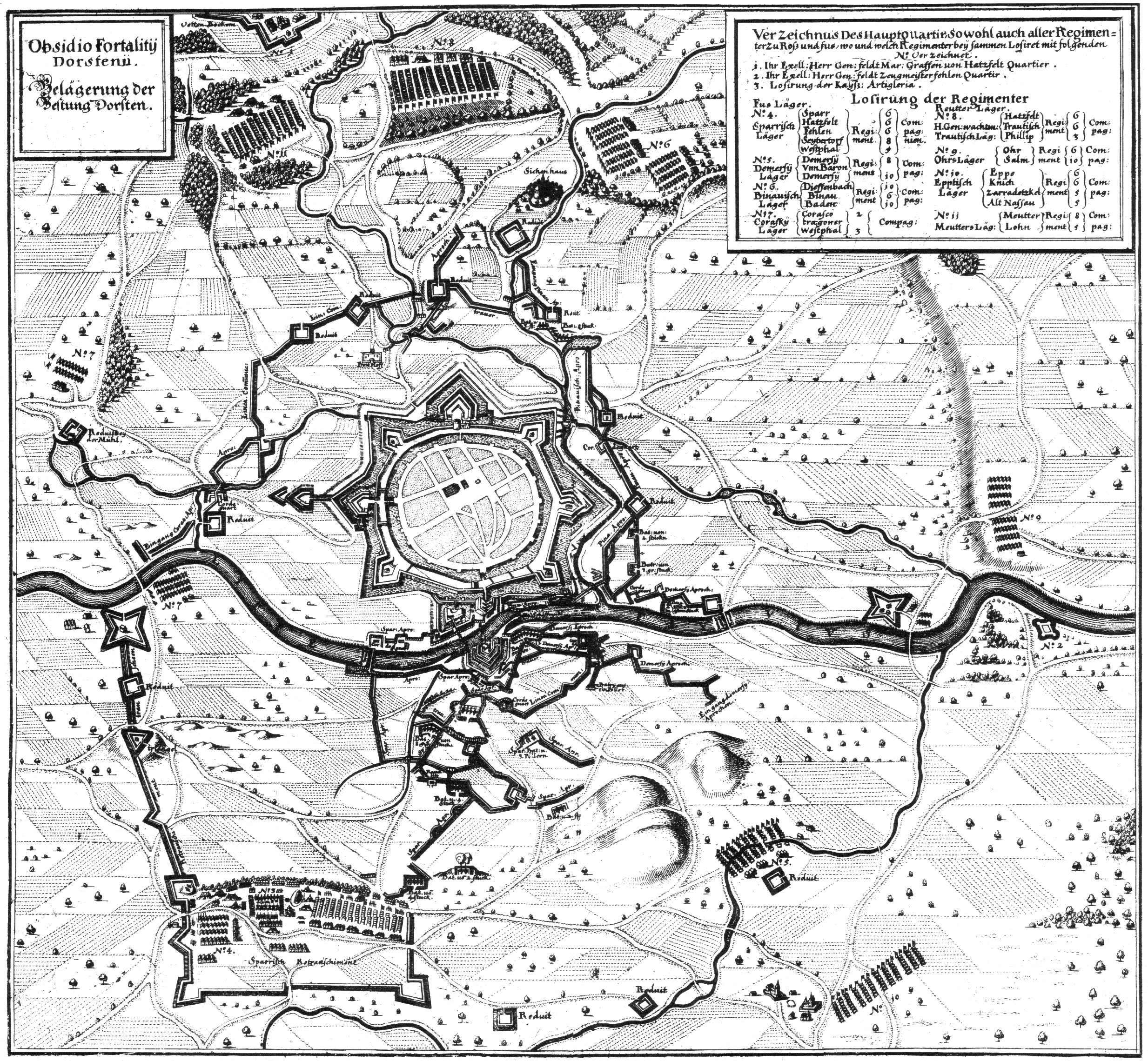
The siege of Dorsten, 1641

== Siege ==
On 16 July 1641, a second siege of Dorsten was begun by imperial Field Marshal Melchior von Hatzfeldt and the imperial Feldzeugmeister, Alexander II of Velen. This attack was started because, earlier, the Hessian lieutenant general, Kaspar, Count of Eberstein had moved off with a portion of his troops to participate in the siege of Wolfenbüttel. Whilst the main body of the Imperial Army was engaged at Wolfenbüttel, Hatzfeld positioned his forces south of Dorsten, whilst Velen deployed to the north. The Imperial Artillery took post to the northeast amongst the sand hills, initially with 14 cannon. They were later reinforced by the Electorate of Cologne bringing the total to 30 guns. In a letter from the imperial Generalwachtmeister, Freiherr von Wendt, dated 16 July, to the mayor and town council of Recklinghausen, he demanded the following supplies for the provision of his soldiers outside Dorsten: 3,000 pounds of bread, 16 tonnes of beer, four head of cattle, 15 sacks of oats and several "kitchen items". The Barony of Lembeck (Herrlichkeit Lembeck) also had to supply food. In early August, Hatzfeld also fetched four half-kartouwen and two fire mortars (Feuermörser) from Kaiserswerth. Soldiers from 12 regiments of infantry and 10 regiments of cavalry constructed extensive siegeworks around the town.

The Hessian defenders were commanded by senior commander (Oberkommandant) Johann von Geyso and town commander Emmanuel Kotz with 2,000 soldiers, 400 of whom had been previously redeployed from Kalkar. Other relief contingents called up by the Hesse-Cassel regent, Amalie Elisabeth of Hanau-Münzenberg, were either very small in number (250 men under Colonel Carl von Rabenhaupt from Haltern and Borken) or arrived too late (troops under the command of Ernst Albrecht von Eberstein from Wolfenbüttel).

On 25 August, the first breach was made west of the Lippe Gate with 2,000 artillery shells, destroying the last line barrier. Once this breach had been widened by cannon fire and plans for an assault with initially 2,000 musketeers and 1,500 cuirassiers got under way, the Hessian commandants opened negotiations over the terms of surrender on 18 September with Field Marshal von Hatzfeld.

The siege ended on 19 September. The Hesse-Cassel garrison were given safe passage for their remaining personnel comprising 650 men plus administrators and families. The Theatrum Europaeum recorded that the town of Dorsten had become a "lamentable ruin" as a result of the siege.

With the capitulation of Dorsten, Hesse-Cassel had lost the most important fortress on the right bank of the Lower Rhine and, in the aftermath, concentrated their efforts in the Hessian War, together with the so-called Weimar Army in French service under Guébriant, on the left bank possessions of the Archbishopric of Cologne under Ferdinand of Bavaria and the neutral Duchy of Jülich under Wolfgang William.

== See also ==
- Thirty Years' War
- Dorsten
- Hessian War

== Literature ==
- Keller (1891). Die Befestigung und Belagerung Dorstens im Jahre 1641 ("The Fortification and Siege of Dorsten in 1641"), Vestische Zeitschrift, Vol. 1, pp. 71–85.
- Evelt, Julius (1866). Geschichte der Stadt Dorsten, Dritter Abschnitt ("History of the Town of Dorsten, Part 3"), pp. 96–102 in the Westfälische Zeitschrift, Vol. 26, pp. 63–176.
