= Battle of Nördlingen (1645) =

Part of the Thirty Years' War

Coordinates: 48.8500°N 10.6167°E

- Part of the Thirty Years' War
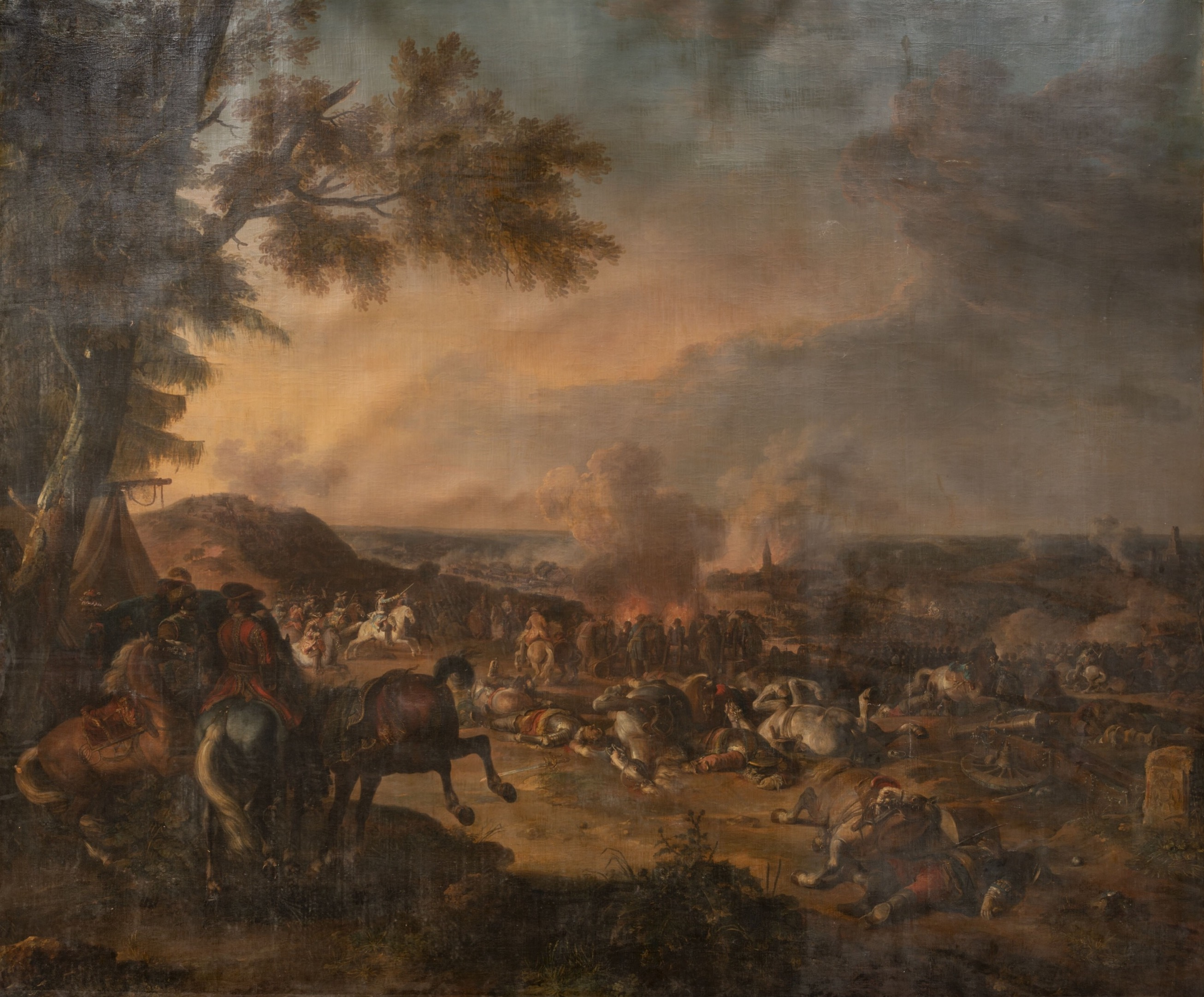
- The Battle of Nördlingen by Jean-Baptiste Le Paon
Date	3 August 1645
Location	Alerheim, near Nördlingen, Germany
Result	French–Hessian victory

Belligerents
France; Hesse-Kassel	Bavaria; Holy Roman Empire

Commanders and leaders
(Kingdom of France) d'Enghien (Kingdom of France) Turenne; Johann Geyso (Kingdom of France) de Gramont (POW)	(Electorate of Bavaria) Franz von Mercy † (Electorate of Bavaria) Johann von Werth (Electorate of Bavaria) Johann von Reuschenberg (Electorate of Cologne) von Geleen (POW)

Strength
17,000 men, (Note: 7,800 infantry, 9,200 cavalry) 27 guns	16,000 men, (Note: 8,800 infantry, 7,200 cavalry) 28 guns

Casualties and losses
4,000 killed or wounded	2,500 killed or wounded, 1,500 captured ,12 guns

The Battle of Nördlingen (1645) (Note: Also known as the Battle of Alerheim.) took place on 3 August 1645 in the later stages of the Thirty Years' War, southeast of Nördlingen near the village of Alerheim. A combined Franco-Hessian army led by d'Enghien and Turenne defeated a Bavarian force led by Franz von Mercy.

Both sides suffered heavy casualties, with Mercy himself among the dead, but the result had very little strategic impact on the war.

== Background ==
The Imperials and their main German ally Bavaria were facing increasingly severe pressure in the war from the French, Swedes and their Protestant allies and were struggling to prevent a French attempt to advance into Bavaria.

=== Geography ===
The 16,000-man Imperial-Bavarian army, led by Field Marshal Franz Baron von Mercy and Johann von Werth entrenched on rising ground near the village of Alerheim, 10 kilometres (6.2 mi) southeast of Nördlingen. A kilometre (6.2 mi) to the northeast of the village, the ridge rises to a height called the Wennenberg. Exactly 1 kilometre (0.62 mi) to the southwest of the village is the Schloss Alerheim, which crowns a hill. Mercy and Werth deployed their right wing on the Wennenberg, anchored their left wing on the Schloss ('castle') hill, and posted their centre on the low ridge between the wings. In the 17th century, Alerheim was smaller and entirely to the northwest of the Imperial battleline between the Wennenberg and the Schloss. To protect their weak centre, the Bavarian and Imperial officers had some dismounted dragoons and foot soldiers barricade themselves in the village. They hoped to defeat the French by forcing them into a disadvantageous attack uphill into the fire of the Imperial cannon.

== Battle ==
Before the battle, Marshal Henri, Vicomte de Turenne united his Franco-German army with an all-French army led by the Duc d'Enghien (who succeeded as the Prince de Condé from 1646 onward) and 6,000 Hessians commanded by Johann von Geyso. The combined army of 17,000 men was placed under Enghien's overall leadership. Enghien's tactics were brutally simple. He intended to launch the French troops in a frontal charge on the Imperial positions. Meanwhile, it took the French army from noon until 4:00 pm to arrange its lines for battle.

In the event, the Imperial army counterattacked almost at once. Charging downhill from Schloss Alerheim, they broke Enghien's hesitant right wing, forcing the Frenchman to call off his attack on the Imperial centre. On the other end of the field, Turenne hammered at the Wennenberg. When the Wennenberg fell, the defeated Imperial right swung back and the victorious left wheeled forward, so that the Imperials faced north instead of northwest. Mercy was killed during the savage fighting. By evening, both armies were still on the field of battle. However, in the darkness and confusion, the Imperials in the village, believing themselves to be surrounded, capitulated. Later that night, the Imperial army conceded defeat and withdrew to Donauwörth.

== Result ==
The Franco-German losses were 4,000 killed, wounded, and captured, including the capture of Marshal Gramont and the death of 3 colonels, along with 70 flags. The Bavarian-Imperial army suffered similar losses. The French were able to subsequently capture the cities of Nördlingen and Dinkelsbühl but Enghien fell sick while sieging Heilbronn. Turenne was left in command and abandoned the siege in front of the numerical superior Imperial-Bavarian army that gained reinforcements from Bohemia by Archduke Leopold Wilhelm. The French Marshal eventually fell back to Philippsburg. Therefore, the only French gain from the bloody victory was their capture of Nördlingen and Dinkelsbühl. Bavaria was at least temporarily safe. Eventually the battle provided no more than a breathing space and did not prevent the invasion of Bavaria the following year.

In 2008 archaeologists dug up a mass grave of 50 skeletons, most-likely French soldiers, just outside the town of Alerheim.

== Sources ==
- Eggenberger, David (1985). An Encyclopedia of Battles. New York: Dover Publications. ISBN 0-486-24913-1.
- Guthrie, William P. (2003). The Later Thirty Years War: From the Battle of Wittstock to the Treaty of Westphalia. Greenwood Press. ISBN 978-0313324086.
- "Mass Grave from Thirty Years' War Found in Bavaria". The Local. DDP. 7 April 2008.
- Wilson, Peter H. (2009). Europe's Tragedy: A History of the Thirty Years War. Allen Lane. ISBN 978-0-7139-9592-3.

== General references ==
- Chisholm, Hugh, ed. (1911). "Nördlingen" . Encyclopædia Britannica. Vol. 19 (11th ed.). Cambridge University Press. p. 742.
- Jones, Morgan (2015). Stories Dead Men Tell: Investigating Approaches Used and the Usefulness of War Graves from the Thirty Years' War (PhD thesis). University of Amsterdam.
