= James Isaac Good =

American Reformed church clergyman and historian

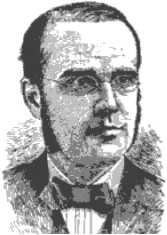
- Born: December 31, 1850; York, Pennsylvania
- Died: January 22, 1924 (aged 73); Philadelphia, Pennsylvania
- Education: Lafayette College; Union Theological Seminary
- Occupation(s): Clergyman, historian

James Isaac Good (1850–1924) was an American Reformed church clergyman and historian.

== Formative years ==
Good was born in York, Pennsylvania on December 31, 1850. He graduated from Lafayette College in 1872 and from Union Theological Seminary in 1875.

== Career ==
For thirty years (1875-1905), his ministered to congregants in Pennsylvania and later held a position at the Central Theological Seminary (Dayton, Ohio). He was also elected as president of the General Synod of the Reformed Church in the United States.

== Death ==
Good died in Philadelphia on January 22, 1924.

== Works ==
- Life Pictures of John Calvin for Young and Old, with George R. Richards (1909)
- The Origin of the Reformed Church in Germany (new edition, 1913)
- Life of Rev. Benjamin Schneider, D. D., a Missionary of the reformed Church in the United States through the American Board at Broosa and Aitab, Turkey, 1834-1877. [1915]
- The History of the Reformed Church in Germany (1894)
- Rambles Around Reformed Lands; History of the Reformed Church in the United States (1899)
- Famous Places of the Reformed Churches (1910)
- History of the Reformed Church in the United States in the Nineteenth Century (1911)
- History of the Swiss Reformed Church since the Reformation (1913)
- The Heidelberg Confession in its Newest Light (1914)
