= Hesse-Marburg =

State of the Holy Roman Empire

Coordinates: 50°48′36″N 8°46′15″E

Landgraviate of Hesse-Marburg Landgrafschaft Hessen-Marburg (German)
- 1458–1500; 1567–1604
- Coat of arms
- Status: County
- Capital: Marburg
- Landgrave
  - 1458–1483: Henry III the Rich
  - 1483–1500: William III the Younger
  - 1567–1604: Louis IV
- Historical era: Middle Ages, Reformation
  - Death of Louis I: 1458
  - Hesse re-united under William II: 1500
  - Hesse divided among his four sons of Philip I: 1567
  - Hesse-Marburg line extinct: 1604
Preceded by	Succeeded by
Landgraviate of Hesse	Landgraviate of Hesse-Kassel; Landgraviate of Hesse-Darmstadt

The Landgraviate of Hesse-Marburg (German: Landgrafschaft Hessen-Marburg) was a German landgraviate, and independent principality, within the Holy Roman Empire, that existed between 1458 and 1500, and between 1567 and 1604/1650.

It consisted of the city of Marburg and the surrounding towns of Gießen, Nidda and Eppstein, approximately what is today called Upper Hesse (Oberhessen).

The area had been a semi-independent county under the counts Giso or Gisonen since the 11th century, which at their extinction fell to the Landgraves of Thuringia in the 1130s.

When the daughter of St. Elizabeth of Hungary, Sophie of Brabant, was able to secure the Western parts of Thuringia for her son Henry the Child in 1265, therefore founding the state of Landgraviate of Hesse, the Marburg area became its core territory.

However, Hesse-Marburg, by its name, refers only to the subdivision around Marburg. Basically the old county. This became an independent principality due to inheritance, i.e. by a landgrave splitting his possessions among two or more sons.

- This was first the case in 1485, but as the landgrave died without issue, and the landgraviate reverted to the greater Hesse.
- This was again the case in 1567, Philip I, Landgrave of Hesse or Philip the Magnanimous split his large landgraviate into four parts, Hesse-Marburg being one of them.

When, in 1604 Louis IV, Landgrave of Hesse-Marburg died without male issue, he bequeathed equal shares of his territory to the landgraviates of Hesse-Kassel (Marburg) and Hesse-Darmstadt (Gießen, Nidda), yet under the condition that both territories should remain Lutheran. Hesse-Kassel was Calvinist at that time.

As the two lines argued over the details of the division, Maurice, Landgrave of Hesse-Kassel annexed the whole territory and introduced Calvinism. After a long dispute and armed conflict, Maurice — who had enemies at home as well — resigned in 1627 and left his part of the territory to the Landgraviate of Hesse-Darmstadt.

However, in the Hessian War of 1645–48, which was a sub-conflict of the Thirty Years' War, the two lines, which were on different sides, again fought over the territory. This war led to the loss of life of up to two-thirds of the civilian population, one of the highest death toll in any German region in history.

In the end, the territory was divided as stipulated in Louis IV's will. Hesse-Kassel taking the northern and Hesse-Darmstadt the southern part.

All areas of Hesse-Marburg are today located within the German state of Hesse.
