= Gustaf Adolf Lewenhaupt =

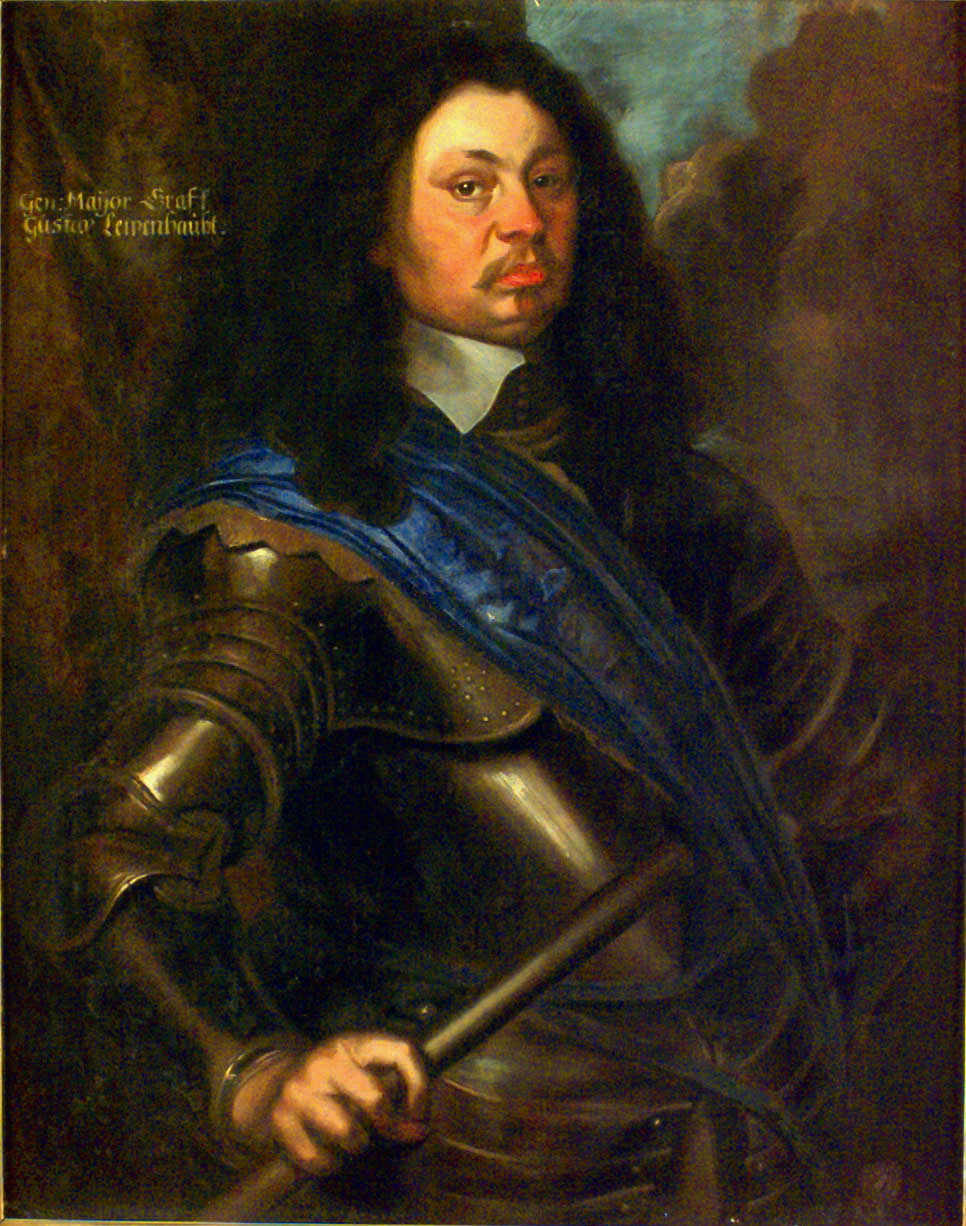
- Gustaf Adolf Lewenhaupt in 1650
- Born: 1619
- Died: 1656 (aged 36–37)
- Children: Gustaf Mauritz Lewenhaupt
- Military career
- Allegiance: (yes) Swedish Empire
- Rank: Major General
- Conflicts: Thirty Years' War; Battle of Leipzig (WIA); Battle of Totenhöhe; Deluge; Russo-Swedish War (1656–1658)

Count Gustaf Adolf Lewenhaupt (aka Löwenhaupt; 1619–1656) was a Swedish soldier and statesman.

He was appointed Major General in 1645, Privy Councilor in 1650, General in 1651, Field Marshal, in 1655 and Governor General of Riga, in 1656. In the Thirty Years' War (1618–1648) he commanded troops at the Battle of Breitenfeld (First Battle of Leipzig), in 1642.

Queen Christina of Sweden promised him the Himmelpforten Convent with all its revenues, and on 30 July/ 9 August 1651^{O.S./N.S.} he was invested with the convent as a fief heritable in the male line (Mannlehen). In the course of the Great Reduction of 1680 in the following year the general government of Swedish Bremen-Verden revoked the enfeoffment to the Lewenhaupt/Löwenhaupt counts, so that Lewenhaupt's son Gustaf Mauritz (1651–1700) lost Himmelpforten again to the Swedish crown.
