= Landgraviate of Hesse-Darmstadt =

State of the Holy Roman Empire (1567–1806)

Coordinates: 49°52′N 8°39′E

Landgraviate of Hesse-Darmstadt Landgrafschaft Hessen-Darmstadt (German)
- 1567–1806
- Military banner (1756–1763) Coat of arms (1736–1804)

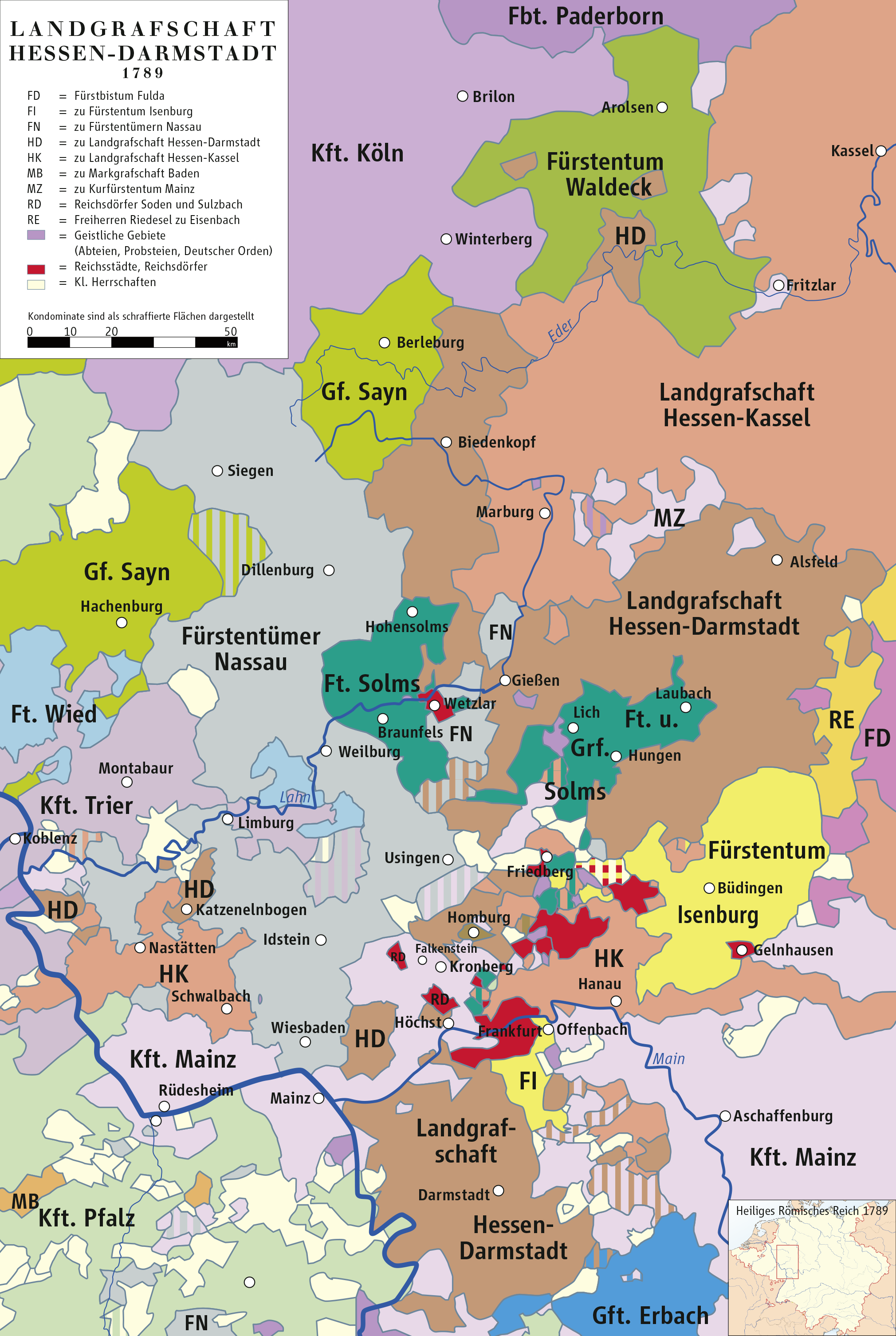
- Hesse-Darmstadt (HD) and Hesse-Kassel (HK) in 1789
- Status: State of the Holy Roman Empire
- Capital: Darmstadt
- Common languages: Hessian
- Religion: Lutheran
- Government: Monarchy
- Landgrave of Hesse-Darmstadt
  - 1567–1596: George I
  - 1596–1626: Louis V
  - 1626–1661: George II
  - 1661–1678: Louis VI
  - 1678: Louis VII
  - 1678–1739: Ernest Louis
  - 1739–1768: Louis VIII
  - 1768–1790: Louis IX
  - 1790–1806: Louis X
- Historical era: Napoleonic Wars
  - Established: 1567
  - Grand Duchy: 1806
Preceded by	Succeeded by
Landgraviate of Hesse	Grand Duchy of Hesse

The Landgraviate of Hesse-Darmstadt (German: Landgrafschaft Hessen-Darmstadt) was a State of the Holy Roman Empire, ruled by a younger branch of the House of Hesse. It was formed in 1567 following the division of the Landgraviate of Hesse among the four sons of Landgrave Philip I.

The residence of the landgraves was in Darmstadt, hence the name. As a result of the Napoleonic Wars, the landgraviate was elevated to the Grand Duchy of Hesse following the Empire's dissolution in 1806.

== Geography ==
Like many petty German states, the landgraviate comprised a number of disconnected pockets of land (exclaves). These included the southern Starkenburg territory with the Darmstadt residence and the northern province of Upper Hesse with Alsfeld, Giessen, Grünberg, the northwestern hinterland estates around Gladenbach, Biedenkopf and Battenberg as well as the exclave of Vöhl in Lower Hesse.

== History ==
The Landgraviate of Hesse-Darmstadt came into existence in 1567, when George, youngest of the four sons of Landgrave Philip I "the Magnanimous", received the Hessian lands in the former upper County of Katzenelnbogen. His eldest brother William IV received the Landgraviate of Hesse-Kassel, while the second son Louis IV obtained Hesse-Marburg, and the third Philip II became Landgrave of Hesse-Rheinfels.

=== Hessian War ===
The Hesse-Rheinfels line became extinct on Philip's death in 1583. When, in 1604, the childless Landgrave Louis IV of Hesse-Marburg died at Marburg Castle, a succession dispute to his lands, along with the sectarian differences between Calvinist Hesse-Kassel and Lutheran Hesse-Darmstadt, led to a bitter, decades-long rivalry. Because the University of Marburg had become Calvinist under the rule of Landgrave Maurice of Hesse-Kassel, his cousin Louis V of Hesse-Darmstadt founded the Lutheran University of Giessen in 1607.

The inheritance conflict was continued in the broader context of the Thirty Years' War, in which Hesse-Kassel sided with the Protestant estates and Hesse-Darmstadt sided with the Habsburg emperor. The Hesse-Homburg and Hesse-Rotenburg estates seceded from the opponents in 1622 and 1627. Though Hesse-Darmstadt and Hesse-Kassel reached an agreement in 1627, the quarrels rekindled, resulting inter alia in the Siege of Dorsten and culminating in a series of open battles from 1645, when the Kassel Landgravine Amalie Elisabeth besieged Marburg. The conflict was finally settled on the eve of the 1648 Peace of Westphalia, more than eighty years after the division of the estates. Large parts of the disputed Upper Hesse territory, including Marburg, fell to the elder Kassel line, while Hesse-Darmstadt retained Giessen and Biedenkopf.

=== 18th–19th centuries ===
In 1736, the Landgraves of Hesse-Darmstadt inherited the estates of the extinct Counts of Hanau-Lichtenberg, again contested by their Kassel cousins. Hesse-Darmstadt gained a great deal of territory by the secularizations and mediatizations authorized by the Reichsdeputationshauptschluss of 1803. Most notable was the acquisition of the Duchy of Westphalia, formerly owned by the Prince-Archbishop of Cologne, as well as territories from the Prince-Archbishop of Mainz and the Prince-Bishop of Worms.

In 1806, upon the dissolution of the Holy Roman Empire and the dispossession of his cousin, Elector William I of Hesse-Kassel, Landgrave Louis X joined the Napoleonic Confederation of the Rhine and took the title of Grand Duke of Hesse.

== Gallery ==
Military regiment banner used during the Seven Years' War (the state flag did not exist or is missing)

Coat of arms (1736–1804)

== See also ==
- List of rulers of Hesse
