= Battle of Wevelinghoven =

Last battle of the Thirty Years' War

Coordinates: 51°5′18″N 6°35′15″E

- Part of the Thirty Years' War
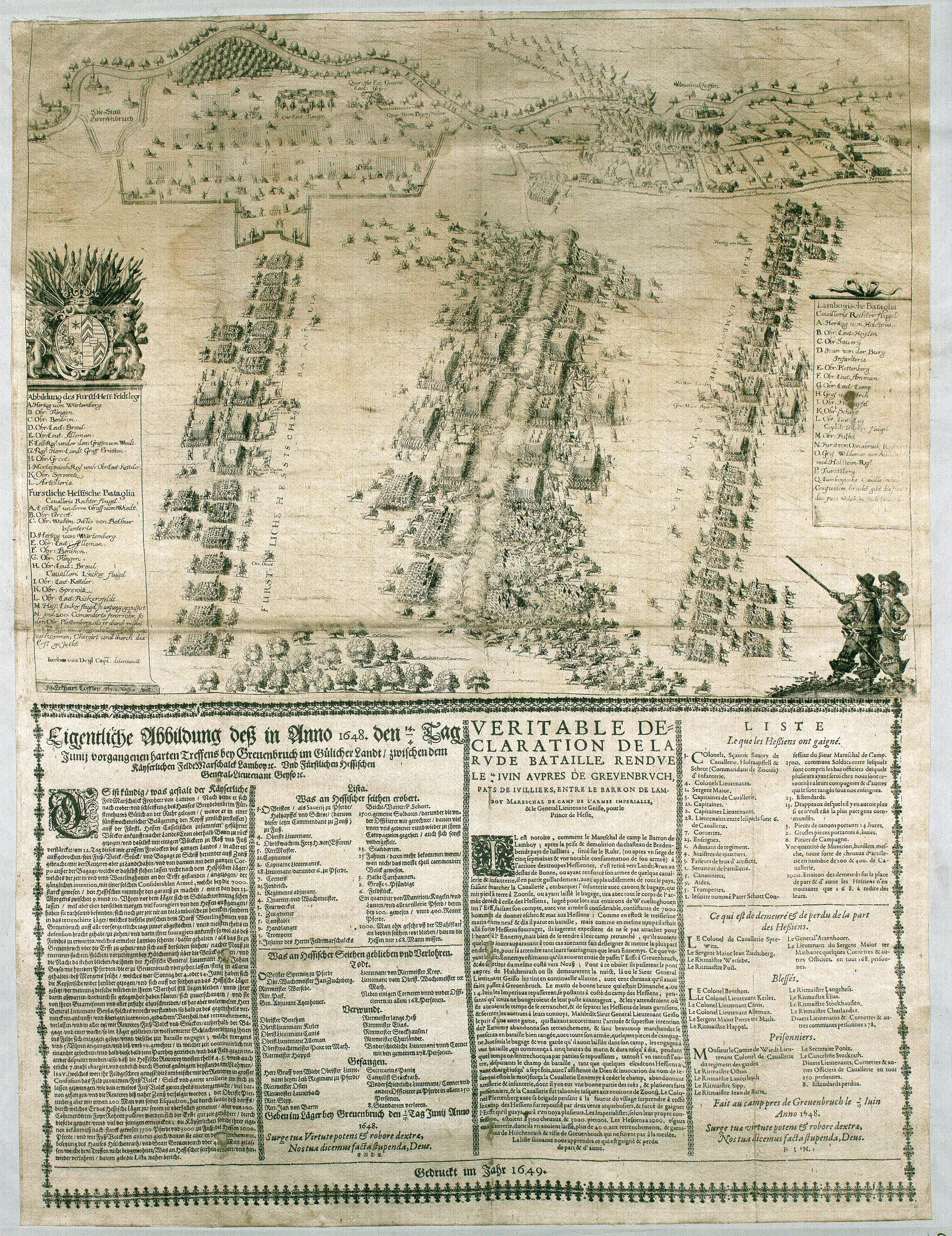
Date	14 June 1648
Location	Wevelinghoven
Result	Hessian victory

Belligerents
Holy Roman Empire	Hesse-Cassel

Commanders and leaders
(Holy Roman Empire) Guillaume de Lamboy	Johann von Geyso

Strength
6,500–7,000 men 11 guns	3,600 men

Casualties and losses
1,000 dead 1,500 captured 11 guns captured	168 dead, wounded, or captured

The Battle of Wevelinghoven (German: Schlacht bei Wevelinghoven) or Battle of Grevenbroich (Schlacht bei Grevenbroich) was one of the final battles of the Thirty Years' War. It took place on 14 June 1648 between troops of Holy Roman Empire and of the victorious Hesse-Cassel. Several sources cite the Julian date of 4 June.

== Background ==
The Hessians under General Johann von Geyso were stationed in Neuss as an occupying power. To the south, on the territory of the Electorate of Cologne, were Imperial Troops under Field Marshal Guillaume de Lamboy. The Duchy of Jülich-Berg was neutral. As Hessian troops marched towards Grevenbroich, which belonged to Jülich, Duke Wolfgang William feared that an occupation of Grevenbroich by the Hessians would be seen by the Imperial side as an opportunity to declare the neutrality of Jülich-Berg as null and void. He therefore asked von Geyso for an undertaking that Grevenbroich would be spared. As a result, the Hessians did not occupy Grevenbroich and encamped near Wevelinghoven, in order to fall back to Neuss. Johann von Geyso had at his disposal 3,600 Hessian troops.

== Battle ==
Lamboy advanced with 6,500–7,000 men and positioned himself on 13 June in front of the Hessian encampment. However, the Hessians did not engage in battle, but pulled back to a pre-prepared site between Grevenbroich and Wevelinghoven, in order to cross the river Erft there and make for Neuss. The Imperialists pursued them in order to cut off their withdrawal and isolate them from their supply lines. This plan was anticipated by von Geyso, however, and he waited for the Imperial troops in battle formation. Around 5 am on 14 June, the two armies clashed. In spite of outnumbering the Hessians almost two to one, the Imperial Army had to retreat after five hours of fighting during which 1,500 of their men were captured and 1,000 lost their lives. Hessian losses were given as 168. Eleven cannons were also captured.

== Aftermath ==
The Imperials retreated to Bonn to refresh their troops while the Hessian encamped between Uerdingen and Linn remaining inactive until September. In September, von Geyso started besieging Düren with the Hessian army and captured it on 21 September despite relief efforts by Lamboy. Afterwards, the Hessians intended to besiege Paderborn, but Lamboy relieved it on 17 October. News of the Peace of Westphalia reached the combatants at the end of October, with the Imperials at Höxter and the Hessians at Brakel.
