= Louis IV of Hesse-Marburg =

Louis IV
- Landgrave of Hesse-Marburg
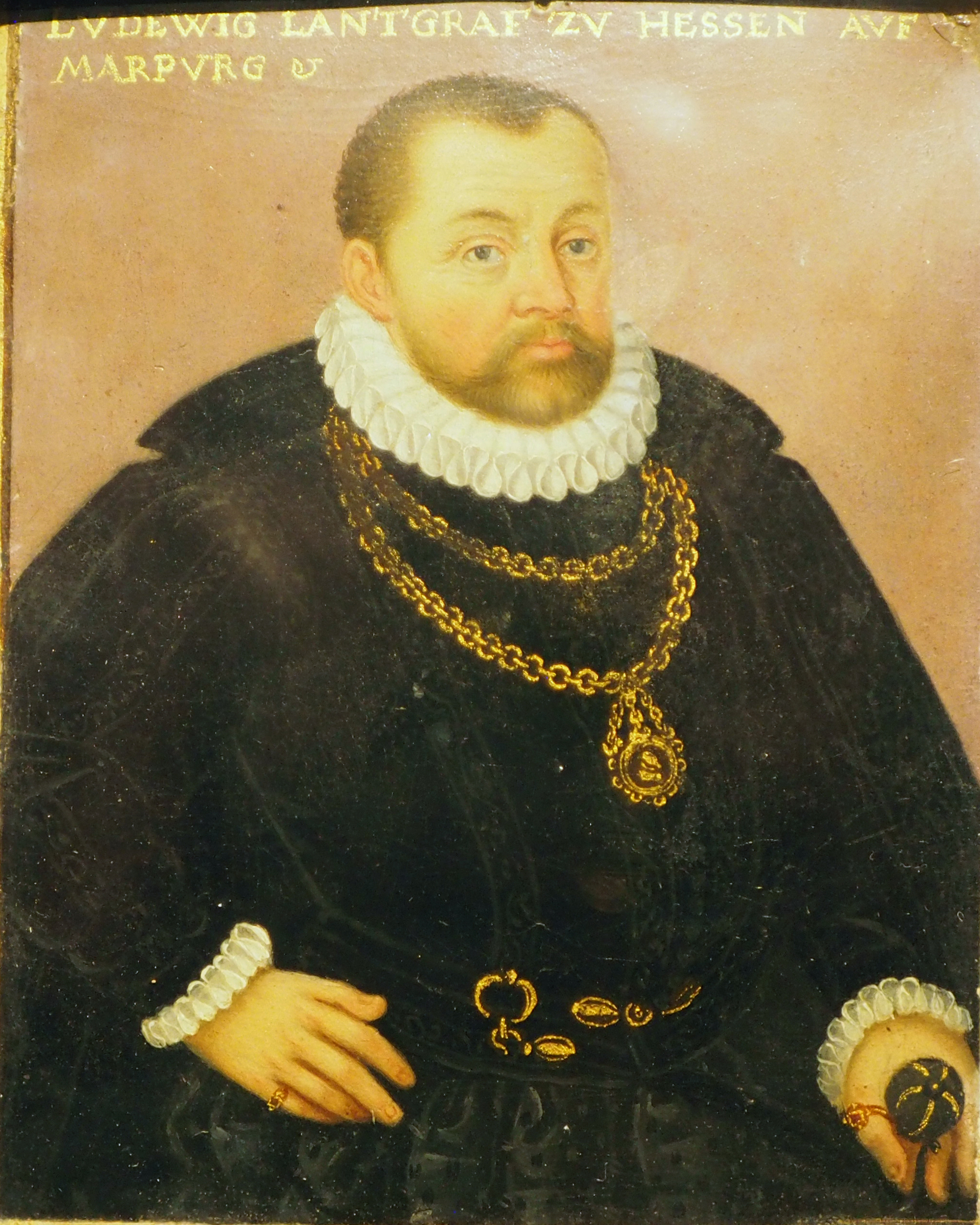
- Anonymous portrait, c. 1595
- Born: 27 May 1537
- Died: 9 October 1604 (aged 67)
- Spouse: Hedwig of Württemberg (m. 1563; died 1590): Marie of Mansfeld
- House: House of Hesse-Marburg
- Father: Philip I, Landgrave of Hesse
- Mother: Christine of Saxony

Landgrave Louis IV of Hesse-Marburg (27 May 1537 – 9 October 1604) was the son of Landgrave Philip I of Hesse and his wife Christine of Saxony. After the death of his father in 1567, Hesse was divided among his sons and Louis received Hesse-Marburg (Upper Hesse) including Marburg and Giessen.

Louis received his education at the court of Duke Christoph of Württemberg. He had the Marburg Castle renovated by his architect Ebert Baldewein. Wanting to enlarge his territory peacefully, he bought parts of the Fuldischen Mark in 1570 from the counts of Nassau-Saarbrücken and the rest in 1583 from the count of Nassau-Weilburg.

On 10 May 1563 he married Hedwig of Württemberg and his second marriage was to Marie, Countess of Mansfeld. When he died in 1604 he left no heirs. His 1597 will bequeathed his territory between his nephew, Maurice of Hesse-Kassel and Louis V of Hesse-Darmstadt, on the condition that it would remain Lutheran.

== Ancestry ==
Ancestors of Louis IV of Hesse-Marburg

8. Louis II, Landgrave of Hesse
4. William II, Landgrave of Hesse
9. Matilda of Württemberg-Urach
2. Philip I, Landgrave of Hesse
10. Magnus II, Duke of Mecklenburg-Schwerin and Güstrow
5. Anna of Mecklenburg-Schwerin
11. Sophie of Pomerania-Wolgast
1. Louis IV, Landgrave of Hesse-Marburg
12. Albert III, Duke of Saxony
6. George, Duke of Saxony
13. Sidonie of Poděbrady
3. Christine of Saxony
14. Casimir IV Jagiellon
7. Barbara Jagiellon
15. Elisabeth of Austria
