= Guillaume de Lamboy, Baron of Cortesheim =

17th-century Habsburg commander

Guillaume III de Lamboy de Dessener
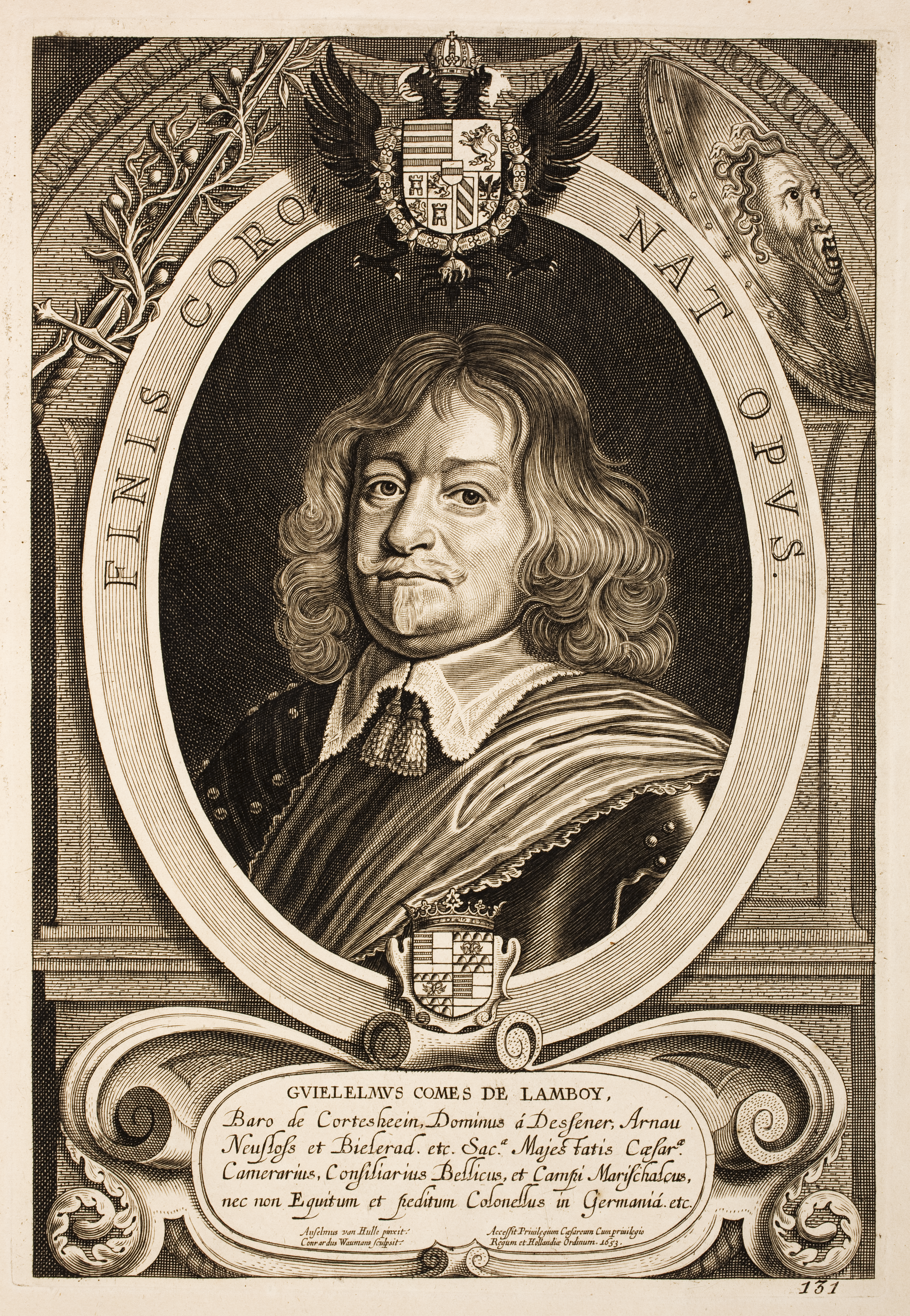
- Guillaume III de Lamboy de Dessener
- Born: 1590
- Died: 12 December 1659 1659 (aged 68–69); Dymokury, Bohemia
- Military career
- Allegiance: Spain; Holy Roman Empire
- Service years: 1618–1648
- Rank: Imperial Field Marshal
- Conflicts: Thirty Years War; Bohemian Revolt, 1618-1621; Lützen, 1632; Siege of Hanau, 1635-1636; Kempen, 1642; Siege of Geseke, 1648; Wevelinghoven, 1648; Siege of Paderborn, 1648; Franco-Spanish War; Les Avins, 1635; Siege of Dole, 1636; Saint-Omer, 1638; Arras, 1640; La Marfée, 1641;

Guillaume III de Lamboy de Dessener, 1590 to 1659, was a Field Marshal in the Imperial Army, who served in the 1618 to 1648 Thirty Years War, and the 1635 to 1659 Franco-Spanish War.

Born in Kortessem, then in the Spanish Netherlands, now Limburg, Belgium, Lamboy was a member of the Catholic, French-speaking, Walloon nobility. During the Dutch Revolt, they remained loyal to the Habsburg rulers of Spain and the Holy Roman Empire. Lamboy himself joined the Imperial army that suppressed the Bohemian Revolt. Despite being a close follower of Wallenstein, he supported the plot to eliminate him in 1634.

In 1636, he commanded Imperial troops during a nine-month siege of Hanau, before being forced to retreat, an event still commemorated each June in the Lamboyfest. He achieved a great victory at La Marfée in 1641 but was captured by French troops shortly after in a painful defeat at Kempen. Only released from captivity after two years, he returned into the military and campaigned with mixed success as supreme commander of the forces of Elector Ferdinand of Cologne. He retired from active service after the 1648 Treaty of Westphalia, and settled in Bohemia.

== Life ==
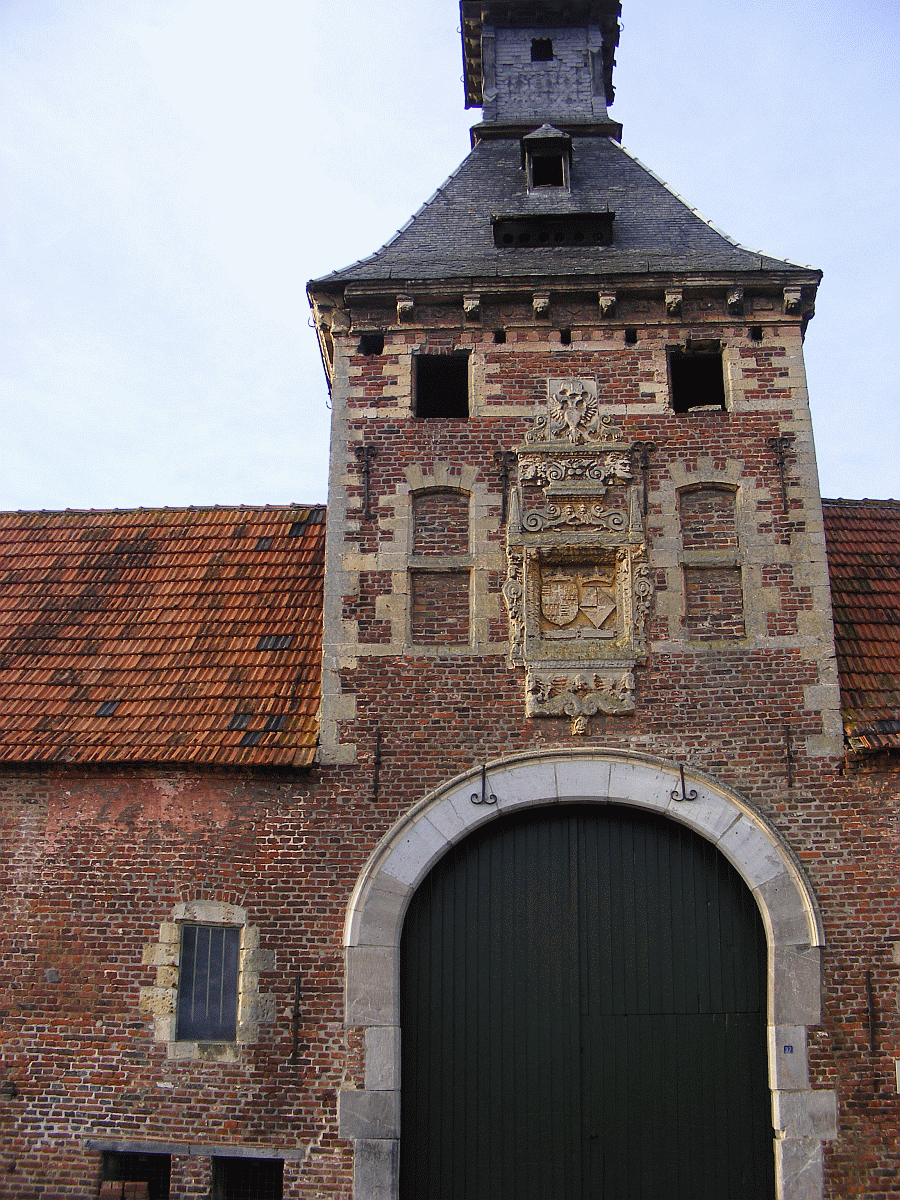
The family home, Dessener Castle

De Lamboy was born in Kortessem, or Corteshem, then part of the Spanish Netherlands, now Limburg, Belgium. His parents were Guillaume II de Lamboy, whose family settled near Liège during the 14th century, and Marghareth de Méan.

His father belonged to the Catholic, French-speaking Walloon nobility loyal to the Habsburg rulers of Spain, and the Holy Roman Empire.

Lamboy's sister, Anne Catherine (1609-1675), was Abbess of Herkenrode Abbey, from 1653 until her death. He married Sybilla von Boyneburg, (died 1687), daughter of Johann von Bemmelburg zu Boyneburgk, governor of Innsbruck. They had four daughters and a son, Johann de Lamboy (died 1669).

Together with Cardinal Harrach, Archbishop of Prague, Sybilla helped establish an Ursuline convent in Prague. Its church, the Church of St. Ursula, was completed in 1672, and is considered an important example of Baroque architecture.

== Career ==
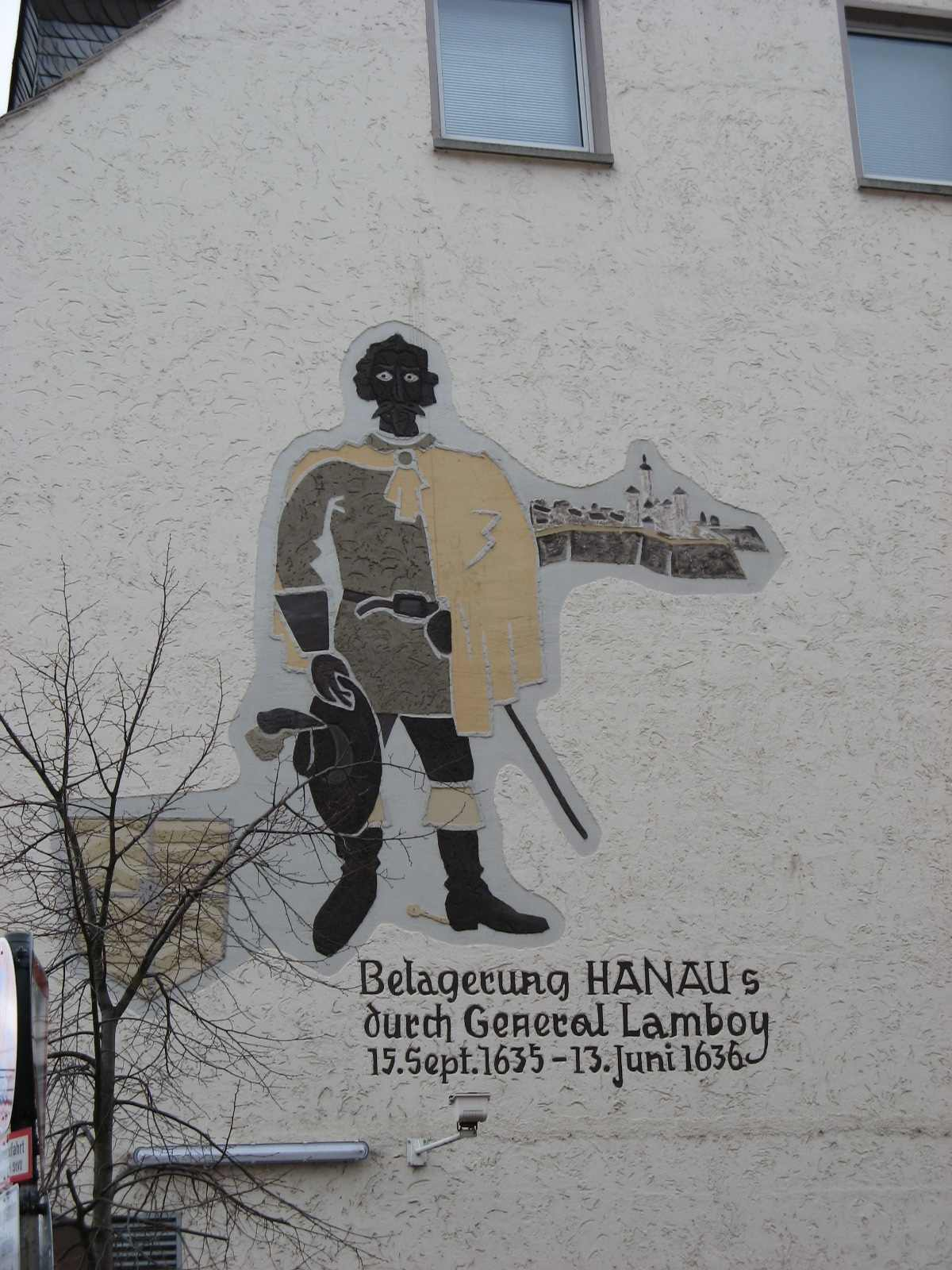
Mural commemorating the Lamboyfest in Hanau

Lamboy's military career began in 1619, when he served under Bucquoy (1571-1621), commander of the Imperial army sent to suppress the Bohemian Revolt. Lamboy became Colonel during the 1620s. His first notable presence was at the Battle of Lützen where he went into a brief Swedish captivity after valorous fighting.

Over the next year, he fought in Saxony and Thuringia under Holk and Gallas. In 1634, Lamboy signed both of the Pilsener Revers that assured the Imperial supreme commander Wallenstein of the loyalty of his officers. Only four days later, Lamboy published the Imperial Mandate in Prague that banished Wallenstein. Emperor Ferdinand II rewarded Lamboy by promoting him to the rank of Generalwachtmeister and elevating him to the status of Freiherr of the Empire. Furthermore, he received Walleinstein's former estate of Arnau (Hostinné).

In 1635, he commanded Imperial troops at the siege of Hanau, which was relieved after nine months in June 1636, an event commemorated for. Afterwards, he participated in the Imperial campaign into Burgundy under Matthias Gallas. The Imperial vanguard under Lamboy and the Lorrain army under Duke Charles relieved the Siege of Dole and chased the French besiegers until Dijon. Lamboy captured the border fortress Verdun-sur-le-Doubs in August but was later criticised by Gallas for abandoning it after one week. Pushed back by Bernard of Saxe-Weimar, Lamboy and Lorraine joined forces with Gallas' main army and took part in a futile offensive in late autumn 1636. After a costly retreat across the Rhine, Lamboy served the next years in the Spanish Netherlands.

Lamboy supported the rebellion of the French nobles Louis, Count of Soissons and Frédéric Maurice, Duc de Bouillon in 1641. Together, they defeated a French army under the Marshal of Châtillon at La Marfée. Nonetheless, the rebellion failed because of Soissons' death in the battle. For his victory, Lamboy was made Imperial Feldzeugmeister. Back in his winter quarters, he was attacked by French and Hessian soldiers at Kempen on 17 January 1642. Overconfident to wait for reinforcements under Hatzfeldt, he was overrun and captured along most of his army.

After two years of captivity in the Château de Vincennes, Lamboy returned as Field Marshal into Imperial service in 1645. He was tasked with recruiting soldiers to support the Spanish Army of Flanders until 1647 when he followed Peter Melander, Graf von Holzappel as supreme commander of the Westphalian circle army, the military force of the Elector of Cologne and the Westphalian Circle. In this function, Lamboy launched an offensive into East Frisia, the main military base of the Landgraviate of Hesse-Kassel. He made no permanent gains and retreated in front of the Swedish and Hessian army under Königsmarck. The Swedes trapped Lamboy's army for two months at Rheine until it could escape.

During 1648, Lamboy attacked the Hessian army at their fortress Geseke in March and at Wevelinghoven in June, both times repulsed with heavy losses. Although he could not prevent the Hessians from taking Düren in September, he outmaneuvered them in October and relieved the Siege of Paderborn one week before the Peace of Westphalia.

After the war, he settled in Bohemia where he resolutely enforced the Catholic faith in his estates. In 1651, the Jesuits established a mission station at Arnau. Because Lamboy was unwilling to grant them more than an initial foundation, they left after a short time and were replaced by Franciscans. Lamboy died at his castle in Dymokury on 12 December 1659 and was inherited by his infant son.

== Residence ==
He rebuilt Dessener Castle, the family estate in 1640. He is buried inside the church of Wintershofen next to his parents.

== Sources ==
- Becdelièvre-Hamal, Antoine Gabriel de (1837). Biographie liégeoise: Volume 2. Jeunehomme.
- Hallwich, Hermann (1883). "Lamboy, Wilhelm Graf von" . Allgemeine Deutsche Biographie (in German). Vol. 17. Leipzig: Duncker & Humblot. pp. 557–564.
- Höbelt, Lothar (2016). Von Nördlingen bis Jankau: Kaiserliche Strategie und Kriegsführung 1634-1645 (in German). Wien: Heeresgeschichtliches Museum. ISBN 978-3902551733.
- Keller, Katrin; Catalano, Alessandro (2010). Die Diarien und Tagzettel des Kardinals Ernst Adalbert von Harrach (1598–1667) (in German). Vol. IV. Böhlau Verlag. ISBN 978-3-205-79008-2.
- Neuhaus, Helmut (1982). "Lamboy, Wilhelm Graf von". Neue Deutsche Biographie (in German). Vol. 13. Berlin: Duncker & Humblot. pp. 440–441. (full text online).
- Parrott, David (2001). Richelieu's Army: War, Government and Society in France, 1624–1642. Cambridge University Press. ISBN 978-0521792097.
- Scheler, Auguste (1862). Le bibliophile belge, Volume XVIII. Huessner.
- Ward, William A (1976). Cambridge Modern History (13 Cb: Modern History 13 Vl. Routledge. ISBN 978-0714630649.
