= Battle of Freiburg =

1644 battle of the Thirty Years' War

- Part of Thirty Years' War
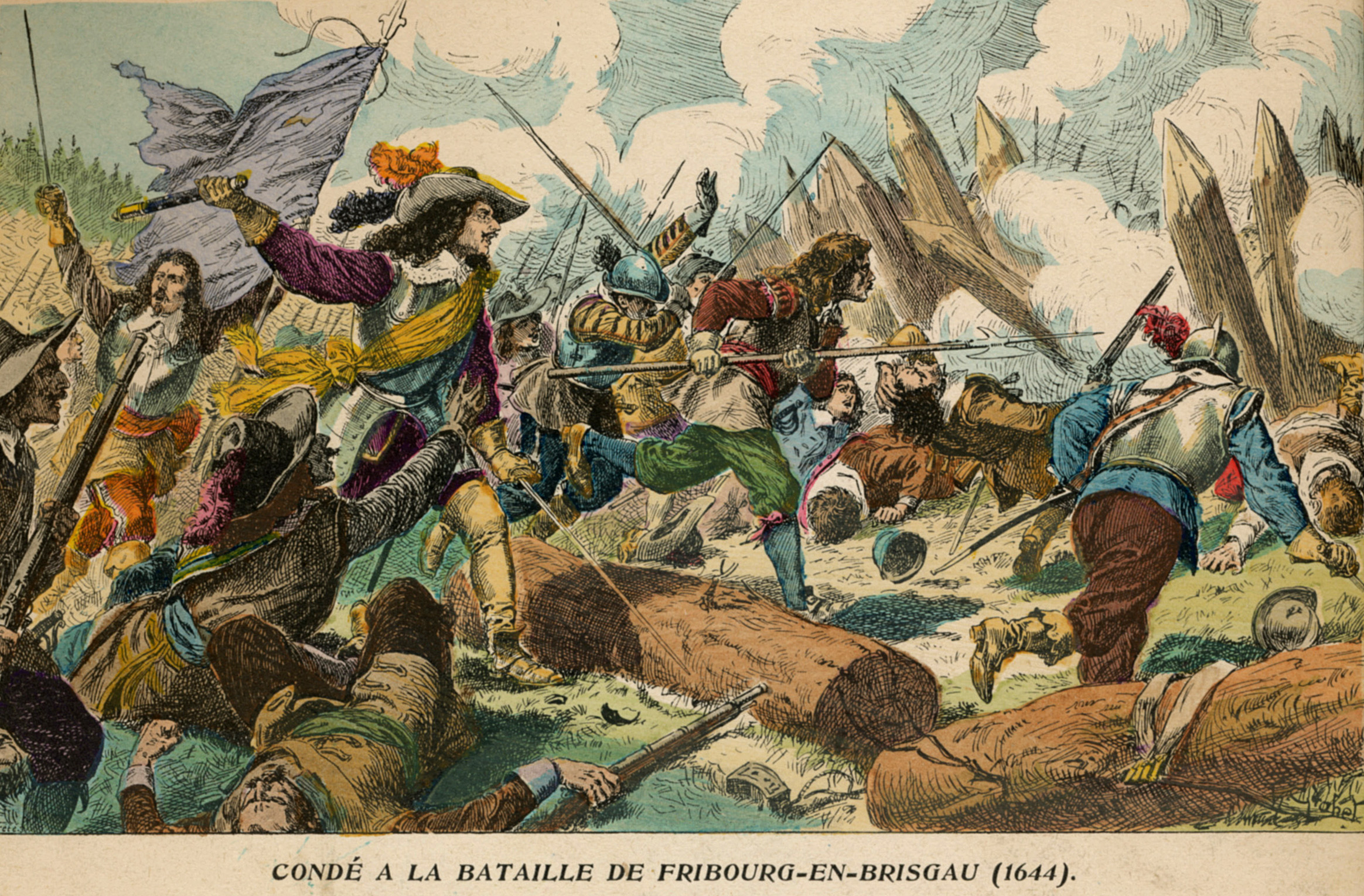
- Condé at Freiburg
Date	3–9 August 1644
Location	Freiburg, Baden-Württemberg
Result	Inconclusive

Belligerents
Kingdom of France	Holy Roman Empire; Electorate of Bavaria

Commanders and leaders
(Kingdom of France) Grand Condé (Kingdom of France) Turenne	(Electorate of Bavaria) Franz von Mercy (Electorate of Bavaria) Johann von Werth

Strength
c. 16,000	c. 13,000 (Note: The number present during the battle is unclear. According to Périni, Mercy reached Freiburg in June with 15,000 men. Schaufler reports he lost 1,600 men during the siege that preceded the battle.)

Casualties and losses
c. 8,000	c. 4,000

The Battle of Freiburg, fought over three days on 3, 5, and 9 August 1644, took place during the Thirty Years' War, near Freiburg im Breisgau, now in Baden-Württemberg. A French relief army of 16,000, led jointly by Condé and Turenne, sought to recapture the town, which had recently surrendered to a Bavarian force under Franz von Mercy. In one of the bloodiest battles of the war, both sides incurred heavy casualties, with neither gaining a clear advantage.

Having captured Freiburg on 28 July, Mercy placed his men in strong defences on the hills outside the town. The French assaulted these positions on 3 and 5 August, and although they made little progress, the Bavarians were short of supplies. On 9 August, Mercy learned a detachment under Turenne was marching into his rear to cut off his supply lines, and ordered a general retreat, leaving a garrison in Freiburg. Apart from a brief skirmish with Turenne's cavalry next day, they withdrew in good order, despite abandoning their baggage train and several guns.

Nevertheless, Freiburg convinced Maximilian of Bavaria to open peace negotiations, and he ordered Mercy to suspend offensive operations. This allowed Condé and Turenne to take control of most of the northern Upper Rhine.

== Background ==
A decisive Swedish victory at Breitenfeld in November 1642 secured control of Northern Germany, while in 1643 their French allies took the offensive in the Rhineland. On 18 November 1643, a French army captured Rottweil, which they intended to use as a winter base, but their commander Guébriant was mortally wounded during the siege. On 24 November, his successor Josias von Rantzau was ambushed at Tuttlingen by a Bavarian-Imperial army under Franz von Mercy and Johann von Werth. Taken by surprise, the French force of 16,000 effectively disintegrated, with more than two thirds killed, wounded, or captured either during the battle, or afterwards as they retreated into Alsace.

Campaign in South-West Germany 1643 to 1645; key locations mentioned in text

Rantzau was taken prisoner and replaced by Turenne, who took urgent steps to rebuild his shattered army. (Note: This was composed primarily of German mercenaries known as Weimarans or Bernhardines, formerly employed by Bernard of Saxe-Weimar (1604-1639). Unlike Guébriant, who had formerly served under Bernard, Turenne was an outsider; many of those who escaped Tuttlingen had not been paid for months, and were on the verge of mutiny, forcing Turenne to pay for supplies himself) The French position was further weakened when Sweden initiated the Torstenson War with Denmark–Norway in December 1643, diverting resources and attention away from Germany. Over the winter of 1643/1644, Mercy used the opportunity to seize control of large areas along the Upper Rhine, Swabia and the Breisgau.

For the 1644 summer campaign, Maximilian I, Elector of Bavaria, decided to capitalise by forcing Turenne out of his bases on the Rhine. To achieve this, on 11 May Mercy first secured his rear by capturing Überlingen on Lake Constance, then advanced on the French-held town of Freiburg. After some skirmishing with Turenne in the Black Forest, he arrived outside Freiburg on 16 June, and began siege operations.

Turenne, who had withdrawn to Breisach, was ordered to relieve Freiburg, which he reached on 1 July with around 8,000 men. By this time, the Bavarians had established strong positions in the mountains at Schönberg and Lorettoberg, as well as a series of redoubts along the plain in front of the town. When his initial assault was repulsed, Turenne broke off the attack and demanded reinforcements from Cardinal Mazarin. On 2 August, 9,000 men arrived in Breisach from Flanders, led by Condé, although Freiburg itself had surrendered on 28 July. (Note: Turenne criticised the garrison commander for his "premature surrender", while Condé tried to have him executed.) As he was senior to Turenne, Condé assumed overall command, and decided to attack the following day.

== Battle ==
=== 3 and 5 August ===
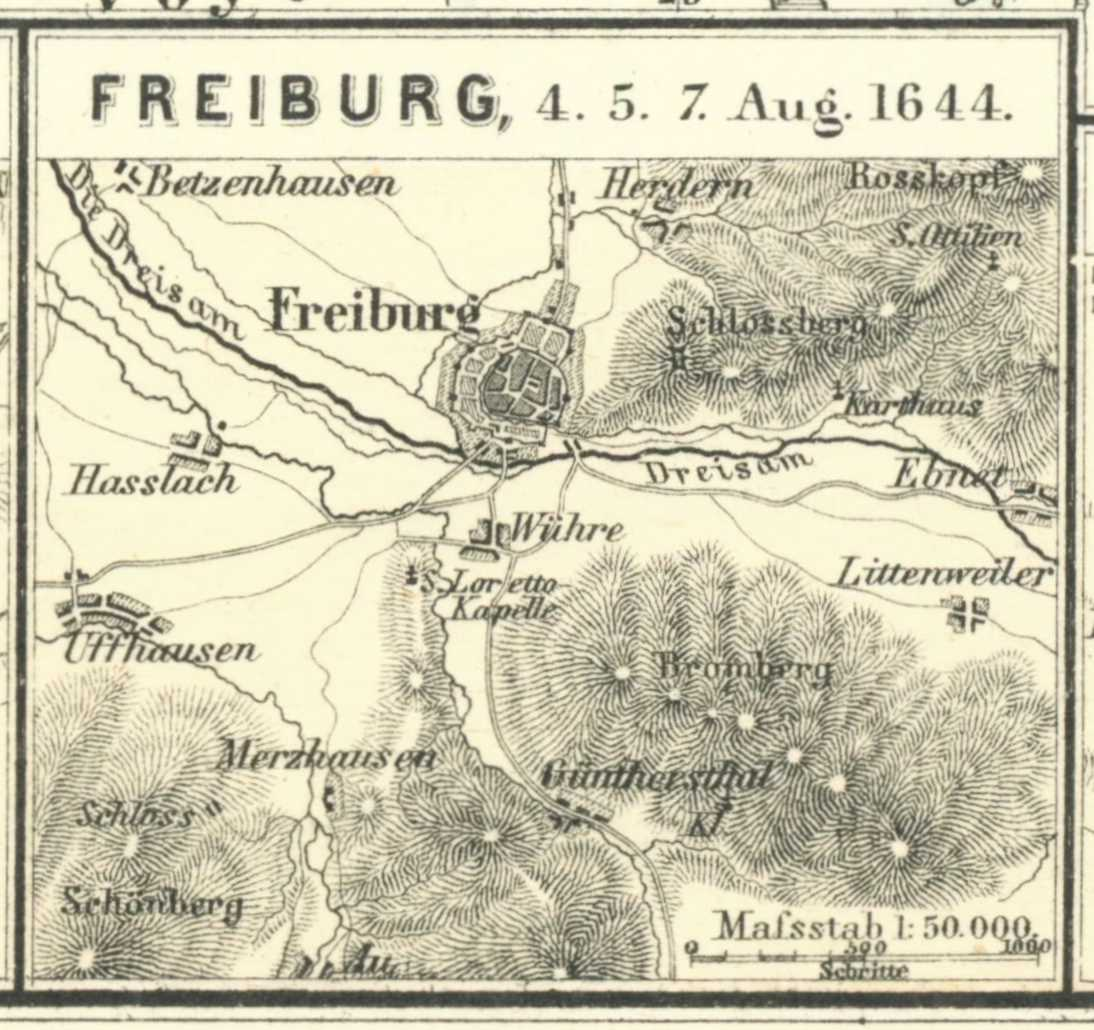
Battle map; note Schönberg (bottom left), Merzhausen (bottom centre), Lorettoberg (Loretto-Kapelle, centre)

There were lengthy debates over the French plan of attack, which were later recorded by several of those present. It was ultimately agreed Condé would assault Mercy's defences on the Schönberg which blocked the main road into Freiburg, while Turenne made a flanking march via Wittnau against the village of Merzhausen in their rear (see Battle map right). To ensure both happened simultaneously, Condé delayed his operations until 17:00 to give Turenne time to move into position.

Despite the difficult ground over which he had to manoeuvre, Turenne began his attack as planned. However, he was driven back by Mercy's reserves of infantry and supporting cuirassiers, and unable to make progress against determined resistance. Meanwhile, ignoring the protests of his subordinates, Condé personally led the assault on the Schönberg. His men took the positions after several hours of fighting, but suffered heavy casualties doing so, while it was now too dark to follow up their success. Although Turenne had finally resumed his advance, many of his men were still coming up, slowed by heavy rain, and at midnight the two commanders agreed to halt operations.

Mercy used this pause to withdraw his troops to new positions at the Lorettoberg. Driving the Imperial-Bavarian forces off the Schönberg allowed Condé and Turenne to reunite their troops at Merzhausen, five kilometres outside Freiburg. However, they still faced a series of formidable defensive entrenchments, while persistent rain meant no fighting was possible on 4 August.

Deciding the only other choice was to retreat, on 5 August the French commanders opted for frontal assaults against entrenchments along the Lorettoberg and at Wiehre. These degenerated into a series of bloody and poorly co-ordinated firefights, which continued for most of the day. When night came, Mercy had held his ground, but two days of fighting had reduced his force by a third, with the French having lost half the number of men engaged.

=== 9 August ===
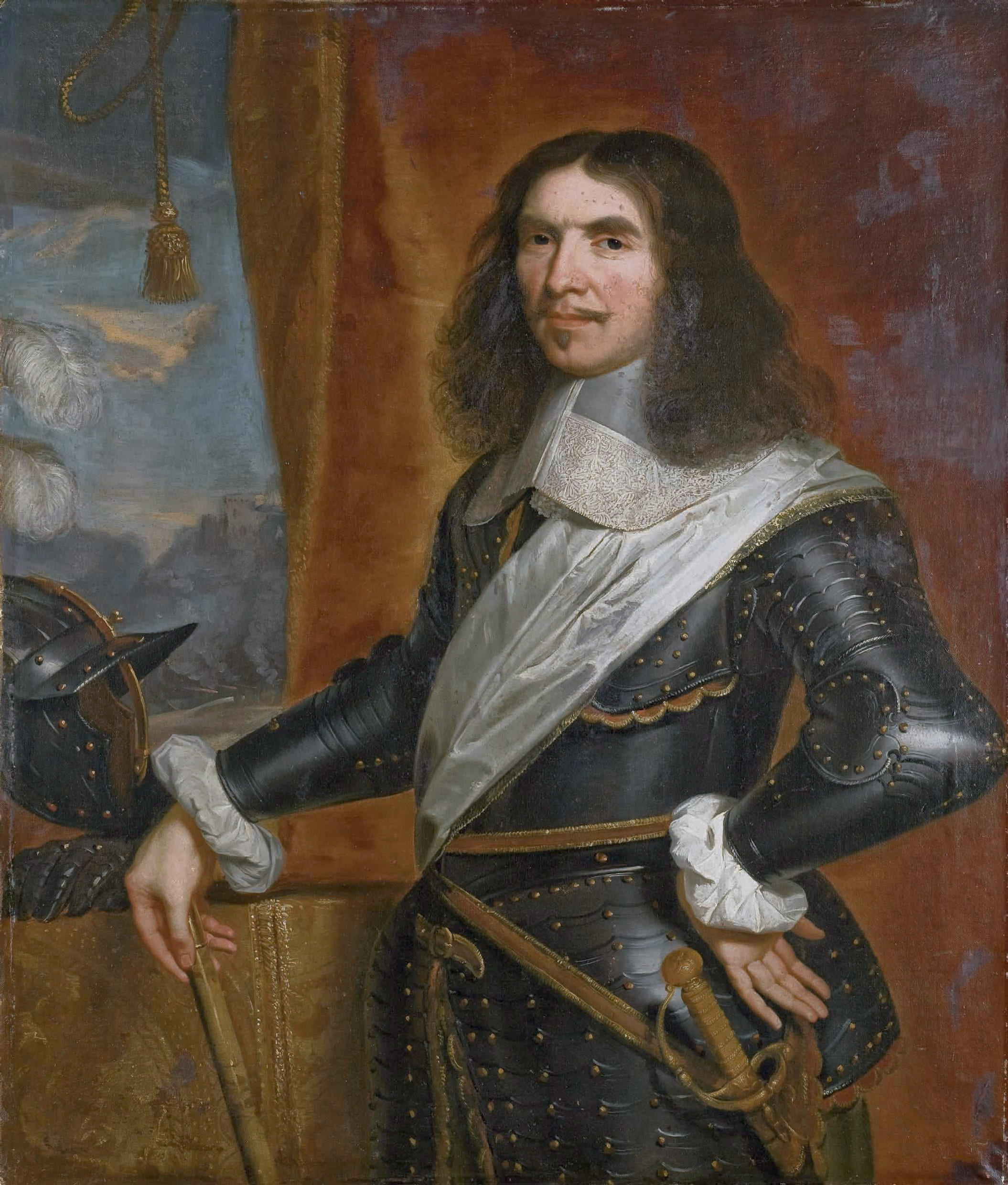
Turenne

The French spent the next three days evacuating their wounded to Breisach, and gathering 5,000 replacements from local garrisons for their next attack. While Condé remained in Merzhausen to occupy Mercy, early on 9 August Turenne took 6,000 men and began marching into his rear at Denzlingen, five kilometres north of Freiburg. Since this would cut off the escape route to Villingen, the French commanders hoped Mercy would be forced to fight, or make a hurried flight. (Note: Like the French after Tuttlingen, or the Imperials after Jankau, armies which retreated in disorder often disintegrated entirely.)

However, Mercy had already decided to withdraw. Two days of battle had reduced his strength to around 6,000 men, who were short of both ammunition and food. The problem was especially acute for his cavalry, essential for covering the retreat but whose combat effectiveness was quickly declining due to lack of forage for their horses. Leaving a hand-picked garrison to hold Freiburg, on 9 August the rest of his army began falling back on St. Peter, which controlled the road to Villingen. On the morning of 10 August, Turenne's cavalry caught up with the Bavarian rearguard just outside the village, forcing them to abandon several guns and some baggage. Despite this, Mercy reached Rottenburg am Neckar on 15 August without incident.

Total casualties for the three days of battle were enormous on both sides. Périni suggests French losses were around 50%, or 8,000, those of the Bavarians about a third, or 3,000. Other estimates range from 5,000 to 8,000 for the French, and 2,500 to 6,800 for the Bavarians. At the time, the French claimed victory because Mercy's retreat left them in possession of the battlefield, a view supported by a number of historians. Others suggest it can also be seen as a draw, or a Bavarian tactical victory, as they fought off the French assaults and inflicted heavy casualties.

== Aftermath ==
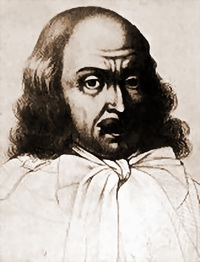
Franz von Mercy; his death at Second Nördlingen in August 1645 deprived the Bavarian army of their most effective military commander

Mercy still controlled most of Swabia, but his losses led Maximilian to ban any further offensive action, while his retreat to Rottenburg left the Upper Rhine exposed. Turenne convinced Condé not to waste the rest of the summer retaking Freiburg, but instead march north to capture Philippsburg, which surrendered on 12 September. After this, the French went on to occupy Worms, Oppenheim, Mainz, and Landau, leaving them in control of the Rhine valley.

Maximilian was now convinced the war could no longer be won, and put pressure on Emperor Ferdinand to restart peace negotiations. These began in November 1644, although fighting continued as both sides tried to improve their negotiating position. Much of the veteran Bavarian cavalry was lost at Jankau in March 1645, while in May Mercy destroyed a French detachment at Herbsthausen. He in turn was defeated and killed at Second Nördlingen in August, depriving Maximilian of his most effective military commander.

== Sources ==
- Bodart, Gaston (1908). Militär-historisches Kriegs-Lexikon (1618-1905).
- Bonney, Richard (2014). The Thirty Years' War 1618–1648. Bloomsbury Publishing. ISBN 978-1-4728-1002-1.
- Croxton, Derek (1998). "A Territorial Imperative? The Military Revolution, Strategy and Peacemaking in the Thirty Years War". War in History. 5 (3): 253–279. doi:10.1177/096834459800500301. JSTOR 26007296. S2CID 159915965.
- Croxton, Derek (2000). ""The Prosperity of Arms Is Never Continual": Military Intelligence, Surprise, and Diplomacy in 1640s Germany". The Journal of Military History. 64 (4): 981–1003. doi:10.2307/2677264. JSTOR 2677264.
- Clodfelter, M. (2017). Warfare and Armed Conflicts: A Statistical Encyclopedia of Casualty and Other Figures, 1492-2015 (4th ed.). Jefferson, North Carolina: McFarland. ISBN 978-0-7864-7470-7.
- Eggenberger, David (2012). An Encyclopedia of Battles: Accounts of Over 1,560 Battles from 1479 B.C. to the Present. Courier Corporation. ISBN 978-0-486-14201-2.
- Godley, Eveline Charlotte (1915). The Great Condé, a life of Louis II de Bourbon, Prince of Condé. John Murray.
- Guthrie, William P. (2003). The Later Thirty Years War: From the Battle of Wittstock to the Treaty of Westphalia. Greenwood Publishing Group. ISBN 978-0-313-32408-6.
- Parker, Geoffrey, ed. (1984). The Thirty Years' War (1997 ed.). Routledge. ISBN 0-203-99549-X. OCLC 252816798.
- Périni, Colonel Hardy de (1904). Batailles françaises. 4e série (in French). Flammarion.
- Schaufler, Hans-Helmut (1979). Die Schlacht bei Freiburg im Breisgau 1644 (in German). Rombach. ISBN 978-3793002239.
- Schott, Rudolf (1978). "Die Kämpfe vor Freiburg im Breisgau, die Eroberung von Philippsburg und die Belagerungen mehrerer Städte am Rhein im Jahre 1644". Militärgeschichtliche Zeitschrift (in German). 24 (2): 9–22. doi:10.1524/mgzs.1978.24.2.9.
- Thion, Stéphane (2008). French Armies of the Thirty years War. LRT Editions. ISBN 978-2-917747-01-8.
- Wilson, Peter (2009). Europe's Tragedy: A History of the Thirty Years War. Allen Lane. ISBN 978-0713995923.
- Zabecki, David T (2014). Germany at War: 400 Years of Military History [4 volumes]: 400 Years of Military History. ABC-CLIO. ISBN 978-1-59884-981-3.
