= Renée Crespin du Bec =

French countess

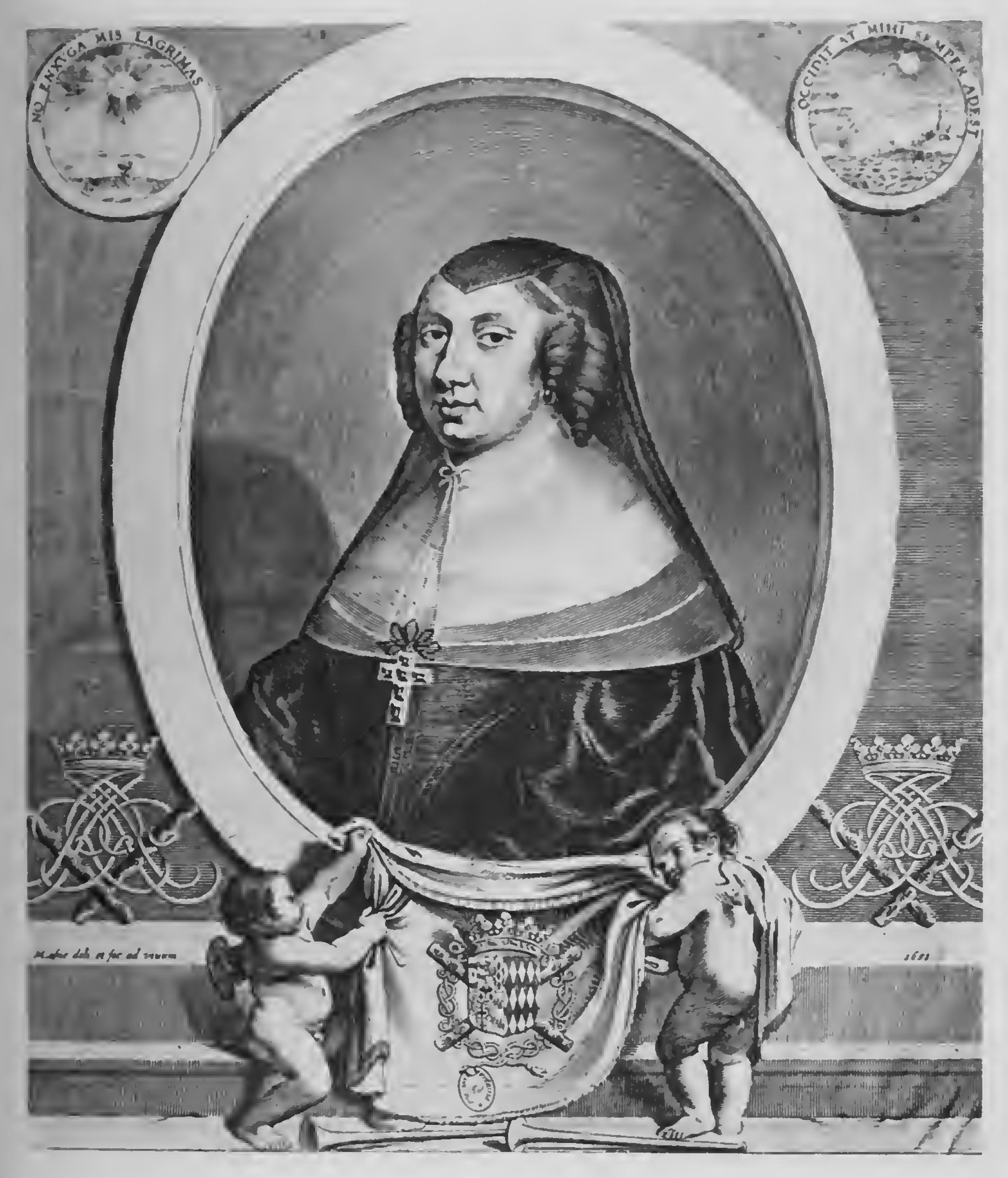
- Died: September 2, 1659
- Known for: ambassador

Renée Crespin du Bec (French: Renée Crespin du Bec, date of death 2 September 1659, Périgueux) — was the Countess de Gebriand, wife of the Marshal of France, Jean-Baptiste de Gebriand, and the first female ambassador in the history of France.

== Background ==
Renée Crespin du Bec was the daughter of René I Crespin du Beck, Marquis of Wardes, and Helene d'Eau.

She was a descendant of the house of Crespin, one of the oldest families in Normandy. On her maternal side, she was related to the Marquises of Saluzzo, and her cousin was the hero of the defense of Rhodes, Philippe de Villiers de Lisle-Adam

According to historian Viscount de Noailles, Renée Crespin du Bec was extremely ambitious, proud, firm, intelligent, resourceful and loved intrigues. According to Albert Vandal, “ambition was her only passion, and politics was part of it”. In the 17th century, she was considered as an unusual woman, and in the 19th history, historians estimated that she had a character of a State leader.

Historians of the 19th century interpreted her harsh and dominant facial features as representing her tenacity and ability to lead.

== Comte de Guébriant ==
Unhappy with the fiancé her family had chosen for her, and whom Renée Crespin du Bec considered mediocre, she insisted on ending the engagement and instead, married a young, but poor officer, Jean-Baptiste de Guébriand, seeing his potential to become a military leader.

Her dowry was 72 thousand livres, and her father promised to give another 30 thousand in the future. For a noble family, this was not a significant amount. The wedding took place on March 21, 1632, in the presence of nobles, including the dukes of Longueville and de Retz.

From 1635 onwards, Guébriant was sent to various fronts during the Thirty Years' War, on February 18, 1638, he officially authorized his wife to conduct all of his business in France, to represent his interests at the court of France, maintain contacts with ministers and ensure the flow of funds to the troops. After Guébriant became commander of the army and a marshal, Renée Crespin du Bec adopted the title La maréchale de Guébriant. According to the first biographer of Guebriand Le Laboureur, this was not an empty title, since while her husband was fighting, Renée asked the government to allocate money and send reinforcements to his army, and, thus, was considered as a contributor to his victories.

== Death of Guébriant and inheritance ==
Since they did not have children of their own, the Countess was engaged in the upbringing of her nephews and nieces, who were the children of Yves Buda, Baron de Sace, who died in 1631. She showed strength in the aftermath of the early death of her husband. At first, she had to deal with the financial claims of her husband's relatives: despite the fact that Guébriant was an honest servant of the king, who despised financial fraud and left a rather modest inheritance, the king had granted him some funds. The discontent of the Countess and their contemporaries was caused by the attempt of Guébriant's relatives to sue for the hundred thousand French livres, which the king promised to the marshal as his share of the ransom for the imperial generals Mercy, Lambois and Ladron, who were taken as prisoners by Guébriant during the Battle of Kempen. Renée Crespin du Bec obtained this payment from the treasury after many difficulties.

== Embassy in Warsaw ==
In 1645 Mazarin and Anna of Austria gave Renée a diplomatic assignment: to accompany Princess Maria de Gonzaga to Poland, whom King Wladyslaw IV married, and to monitor the fulfilment of the terms of the agreement with France by the Polish court. The Countess de Guébriant was entrusted with the mission of providing the princess with a good reception and helping her gain influence over her husband.

Renée was given significant funds, and was appointed the official head of the diplomatic mission with the rank of "ambassador-at-large" (in French: "ambassadrice extraordinaire"), which gave her the right to occupy the position next in rank after the royal family of France. The Bishop of Orange was appointed as her assistant and coadjutor.

The corresponding instructions were given by the Ministry of Foreign Affairs on December 29, 1645, and the Countess joined the princess in Peronne, who had left from Paris on November 27, 1645.

Passing through the Spanish Netherlands, Holland and German lands, the embassy officials arrived in Gdansk, where their arrival created such a sensation that the Elector of Brandenburg, Friedrich Wilhelm, specially came incognito to see the French.

In Warsaw, the Countess de Guébriant, among other things, had to insist on the consummation of the marriage, since King Vladislav was not in good health, and there were rumours he was impotent. Negotiations with the king himself were also associated with some difficulties, since Vladislav spoke fluently only Italian, so the countess's niece, young Anna de Gebrian, was brought in as a translator.

The mission ended in complete success. Maria de Gonzaga took a strong position at the Polish court, which did not shake even after the imminent death of her husband. On April 8, 1646, Renée sent a dispatch to Mazarin with a message about the successful completion of the embassy, and on the 10th of April, the mission departed from Warsaw. The return journey included a passage through the Austrian lands, Venice, Northern Italy and by sea from Genoa to Marseille.

Mademoiselle Anna de Guébriant, whom the marshal loved like her own daughter, fell seriously ill on the road, and died shortly after returning to Paris.

== Breisach case ==
The Countess performed a less successful mission, the mission of Mazarin, during the time of the Fronde. In 1650, the cardinal sent the son-in-law of the Secretary of State for Military Affairs, Michel Le Tellier, the Marquis de Tayade, to replace Charlevoix, the commandant of the fortress Breisach. Taking advantage of the difficulties of the government, Charlevoix refused to resign and locked himself in the fortress. His actions were a form of rebellion against Mazarin's authority, and the governor of Alsace and Philippsburg, Count d'Harcourt, who himself wanted to take command in Breisach, took a neutral position in the conflict, refusing to help Mazarin.

The Countess found a way to lure Charlevoix out of the fortress, using his voluptuousness. Walking regularly under the walls of the castle in the company of a pretty companion, she caught the attention of Charlevoix. Eventually, he was captured by soldiers sitting in ambush but later released after he struck a deal with the Comte d'Harcourt.

The last mission the Countess de Guébriant received was in 1659, when the negotiations on the conclusion of the Treaty of the Pyrenees between Spain and France were coming to an end. In this agreement, Maria Theresa of Spain became the wife of Louis XIV, and Renée de Crespin was appointed her first maid of honor. She left Paris for the Spanish border, but died on the way, in Périgueux.

== Bibliography ==
- Biographie bretonne; recueil de notices sur tous les Bretons qui se sont fait un nom soit par leurs vertus ou leurs crimes, soit dans les arts, dans les sciences, dans les lettres, dans la magistrature, dans la politique, dans la guerre, etc., depuis le commencement de l'ère chrétienne jusqu'à nos jours. T. II. — Vannes-Paris: Cauderan; Dumoulin, 1857., pp. 851–852
- La grande encyclopédie. T. XIX. — P., 1894., p. 508
- Le Laboureur J. Relation du voyage de la reine de Pologne et du retour de la maréchale de Guébriant, ambassadrice extraordinaire. P., 1647. in-4°
- Louvet L. Guébriant (Renée du Bec-Crespin, maréchale de) // Nouvelle Biographie générale. T. XXII. — P.: Firmin Didot frères, 1858., col. 356—358
- Noailles A.-M., vicomte de. Épisodes de la guerre de Trente ans. Le maréchal de Guébriant (1602—1643). — P.: Perrin et Cie, 1913.
- Vandal A. Un mariage politique au XVIIe siècle. Marie de Gonzague à Varsovie // Revue des Deux Mondes. No. 2. — 1883.
