= Joachim Christian von der Wahl =

17th century Bavarian Field Marshal

Joachim Christian von der Wahl Graf von der Wahl
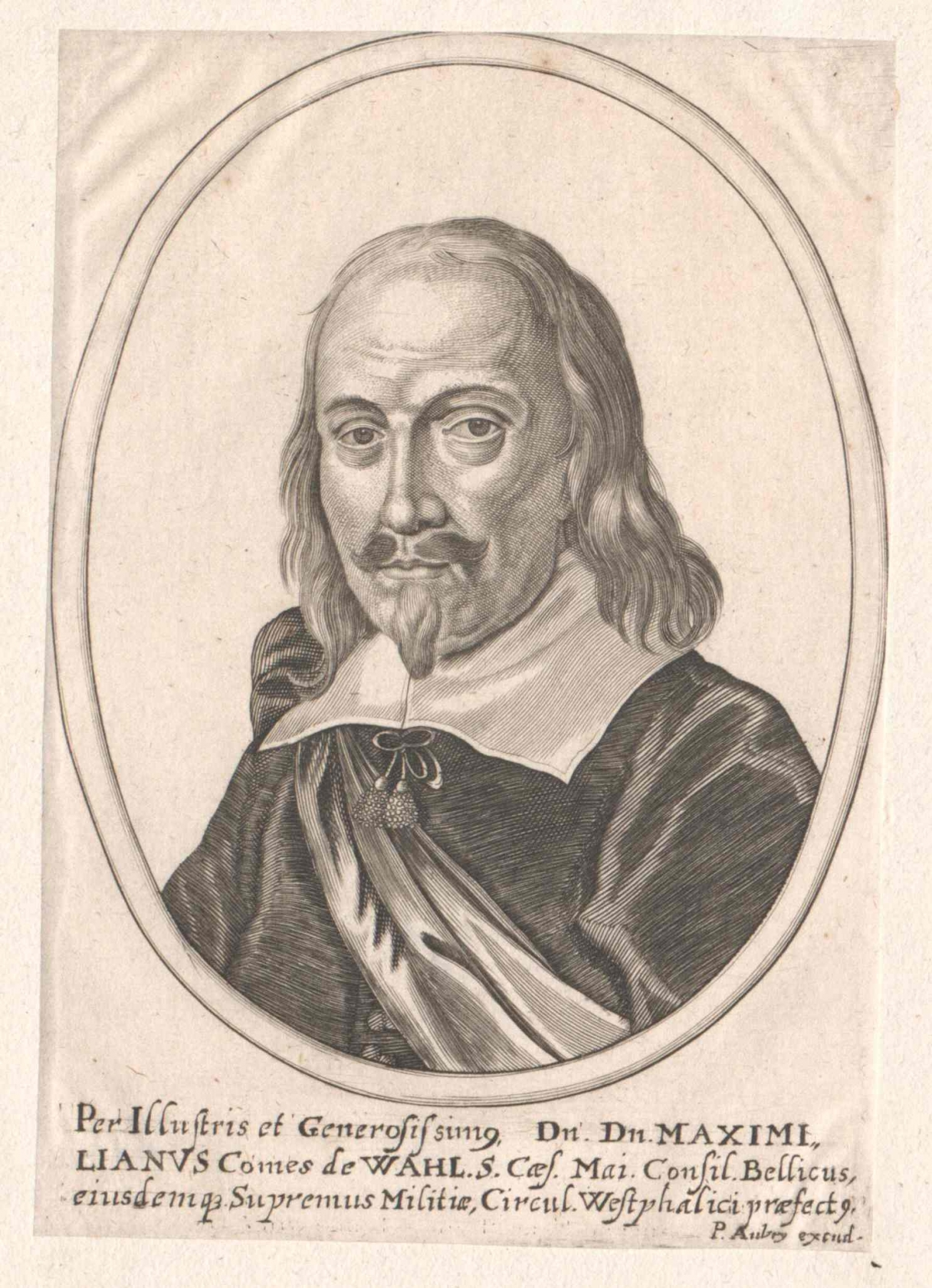
- Joachim Christian von der Wahl (1590–1644) in a copper engraving by the Strasbourg artist Peter Aubry (1610–1686).
- Born: 1590; Thuringia
- Died: 1644 (aged 53–54); Ingolstadt, Bavaria
- Burial place: St. Moritz
- Spouse: Esther Juliane von Herzau
- Children: Ferdinand Franz Albrecht von der Wahl
- Relatives: Johan Joachim von der Wahl (Brother)
- Military career
- Allegiance: Bavaria (Electorate of Cologne) Westphalian Army
- Service years: Unknown–1643
- Rank: Field Marshal
- Commands: Ingolstadt
- Conflicts: Thirty Years War: Battle of White Mountain; Siege of Heidelberg; Capture of Stade; Sack of Magdeburg; Battle of Breitenfeld; Defense of Amberg; Assault on Kempten; Battle of Nördlingen; Siege of Augsburg; Captured of Soest; Bernard's Upper Rhine Campaign; Battle of Rheinfelden; Lippe Conflict; Battle of Wolfenbüttel; Siege of Düren; Siege of Lechenich

Joachim Christian, Graf von der Wahl (1590–1644), was a Field Marshal of the Electorate of Bavaria and the governor of Ingolstadt. From 1639 to 1643, he served as commander-in-chief of the Bavarian troops during the Thirty Years' War.

A convert from Protestantism, he attained the highest ranks on the Catholic side. At the same time, he was a member of the Fruitbearing Society and maintained good relations with Protestant princes. Despite suffering severe war injuries, he served as an officer in the field for over two decades.

== Early life ==
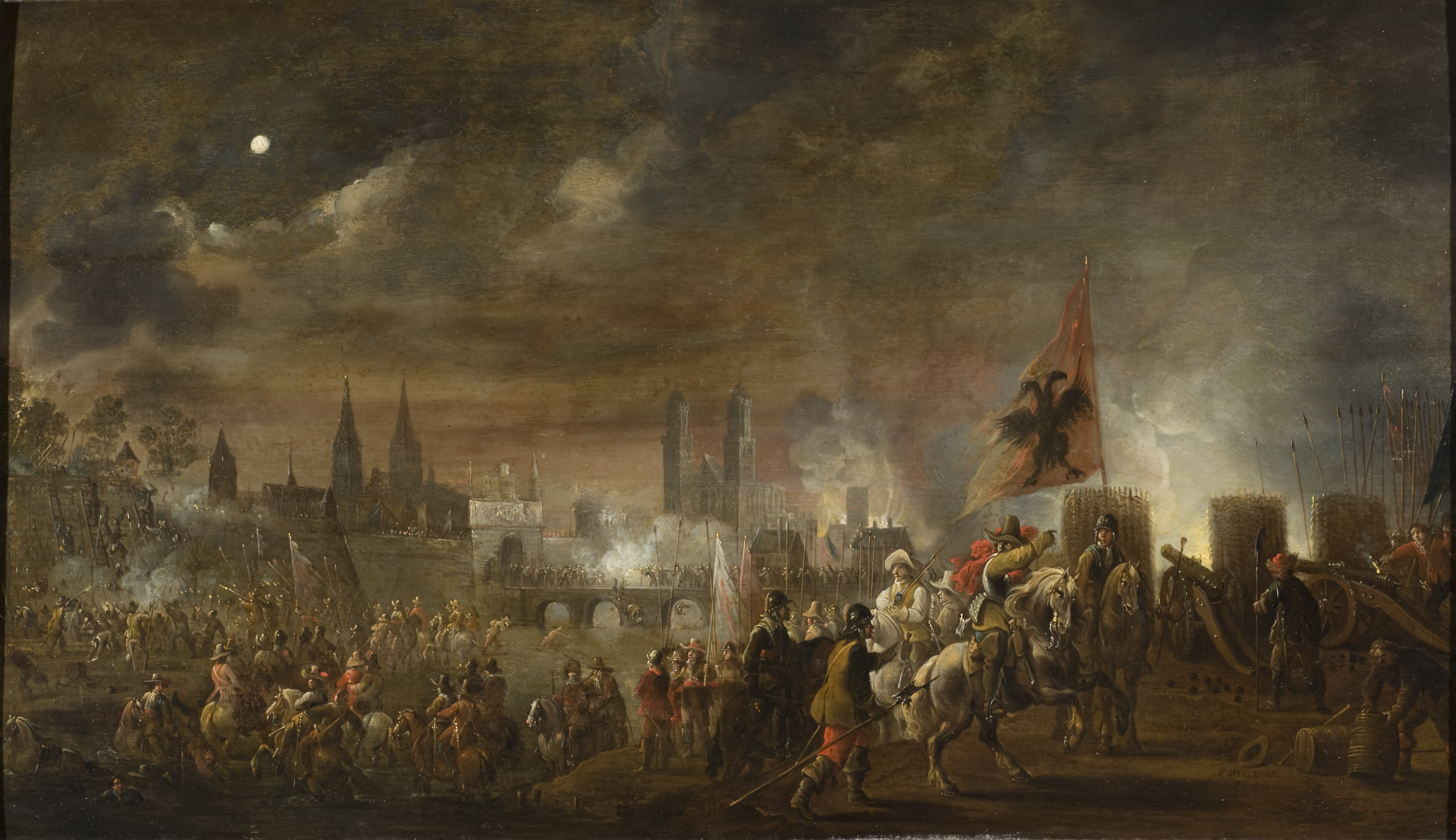
The Sack of Magdeburg by Peeter Meulener

Joachim was born into a Protestant family in Thuringia and converted to Catholicism at an early age. Even before the outbreak of the Thirty Years' War, he was in the service of the Bavarian Duke, and later Elector, Maximilian. While serving as a captain at the Battle of White Mountain, he sustained such a severe injury to his left arm that it had to be amputated. During the Siege of Heidelberg, under the overall command of Count Johan von Tilly, Wahl suffered a gunshot wound to his left knee that permanently impaired his mobility.

In 1626, he became a lieutenant colonel and commander of Tilly's regiment. At the same time, he was admitted to the Fruitbearing Society under the fitting name "Der Anhenkende" (The Clinger/The Adherent). A year later, he was promoted to colonel, and in 1629, he took over the regiment of Matthias Gallas, who had transferred to Imperial service. He participated in the Capture of Stade in 1629 and the storming of Magdeburg in 1631. Wahl wrote to Ernst Casimir of Nassau-Dietz, with whom he maintained a friendly relationship, regarding the horrific outcome of the assault. In his letter, Wahl held the city commander, Dietrich von Falkenberg, responsible for starting the fire that reduced the city to ashes.

=== General in Swabia and the Upper Palatinate ===
Following further service at the Battle of Nreitenfeld in 1631, Wahl rose to the rank of general, specifically as a Generalwachtmeister of infantry. His first command was in Amberg in the Upper Palatinate; he successfully held the town against the Swedes, who had occupied the rest of the region. In the summer of 1632, he and Otto Heinrich Fugger recaptured the towns of Rain am Lech and Landsberg am Lech in Swabia. Towards the end of the year, he marched south under the command of Johann von Aldringen.

While Aldringen captured Memmingen, Wahl advanced on Kempten, which he managed to take only on the fourth assault attempt on January 12, 1633. During the storming of the town, the population was mercilessly slaughtered. Those who had sought refuge in the Burghalde (Note: the town's fortified heights) were forced to buy their freedom for large sums of money.

In January 1634, Wahl was promoted to Feldmarschallleutnant . (Note: Lieutenant Field Marshal) After the Battle of Nördlingen, Maximilian of Bavaria ordered him to capture Augsburg; he forced the city to surrender on March 18, 1635, following a seven-month siege. Wahl subsequently returned to Amberg, from where he drove the Swedish occupation forces out of the Upper Palatinate.

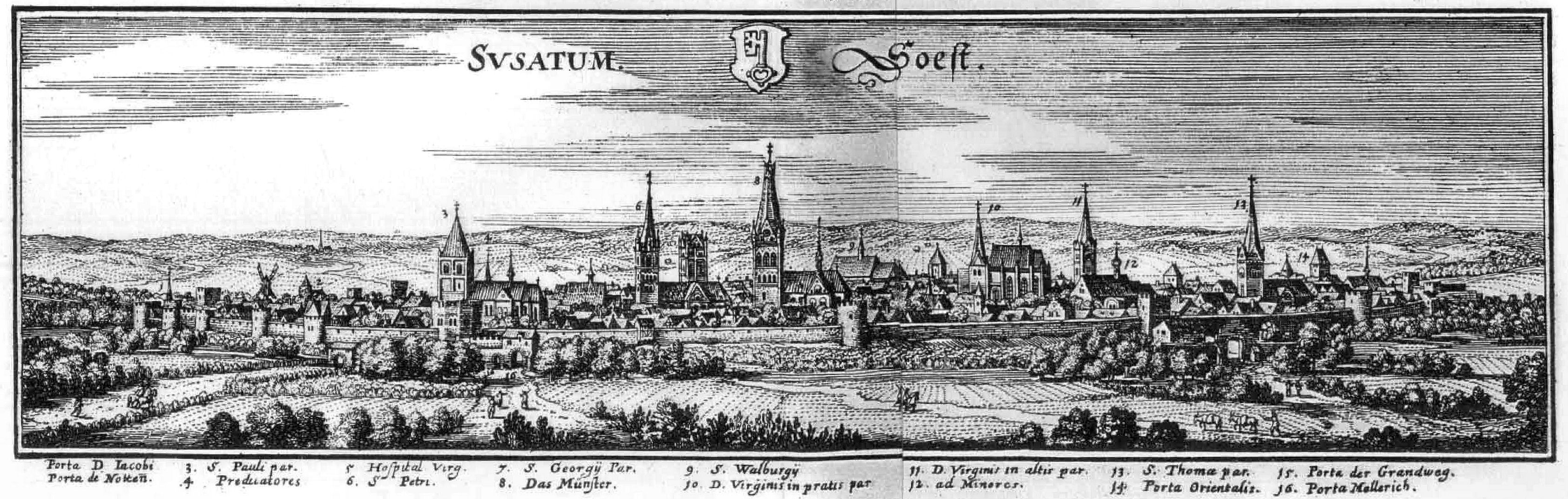
Soest, captured in 1636, as depicted in Matthäus Merian's Topographia Westphaliae

Following complaints from the Amberg administration regarding the excessive self, enrichment of Wahl's officers, Elector Maximilian of Bavaria recalled him from the Upper Palatinate on October 16. The following year, he was sent to Westphalia to serve alongside the commander-in-chief Johann von Götz, replacing Jost Maximilian von Bronckhorst-Gronsfeld in that role. In September, the two captured the city of Soest from the Hessian garrison. Subsequently, Wahl was promoted to Feldzeugmeister and raised to the rank of Imperial Count on November 11, 1636.

=== Supreme Command in Westphalia and of the Bavarian Army ===
In 1637, following Götz's departure, Wahl assumed supreme command in Westphalia; however, he lacked sufficient troops to take decisive action against Hesse-Kassel under Peter Melander. Melander's troops had managed to capture Vechta and Bielefeld and secure a safe retreat zone by occupying neutral East Frisia. In 1638, many Bavarian troops were withdrawn to southern Germany to counter the advance of Bernard of Saxe-Weimar.

Wahl's own regiment distinguished itself at the Battle of Rheinfelden; under the command of Johann von Werth, it was one of the few units able to withstand the enemy's surprise attack for an extended period, though a large portion of it was ultimately taken prisoner. There is no record of Wahl's personal participation in the battles and sieges along the Upper Rhine.

In early 1639, he was appointed Field Marshal and Commander-in-Chief of the Bavarian troops, succeeding Götz, who had been dismissed and arrested in late 1638, even though Maximilian no longer considered him fit for active field service at that time due to his war injuries. When negotiations regarding Hesse-Kassel's accession to the Peace of Prague failed, Elector Maximilian, at the request of his brother Ferdinand, the Elector of Cologne, sent Wahl back to Westphalia that same year to campaign against the Hessian forces.

In May 1640, Wahl marched to Detmold; in consultation with Catherine of Waldeck-Wildungen, mother of the young Count Simon Philip of Lippe, he occupied the town and installed Catherine as regent in place of Simon's uncle, Johann Bernhard. By mid-1640, Wahl was commanding Bavarian and Electorate of Cologne troops, alongside Imperial forces under Melchior von Hatzfeldt, against the armies of Duke George of Brunswick-Lüneburg and Landgravine Amalie Elisabeth of Hanau-Münzenberg.

In September, Wahl crossed the Weser near Rinteln to threaten the enemy forces from the rear. Troops from Lüneburg prevented Wahl from linking up with the Imperial garrison at Wolfenbüttel by occupying Bockenem in time. Nevertheless, Wahl's troops plundered the Lüneburg region before withdrawing to take up winter quarters in the Bishopric of Münster.

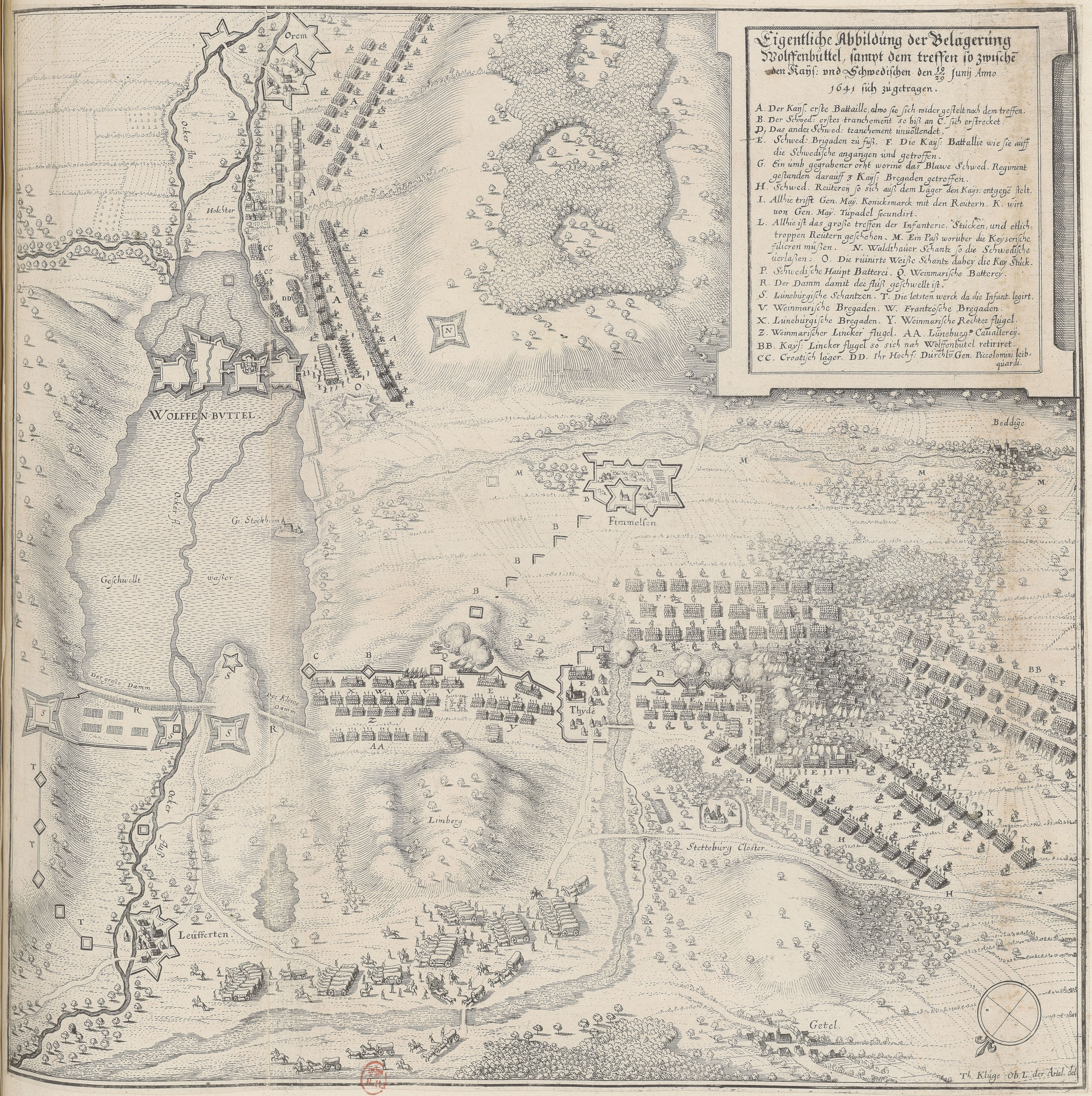
Copperplate engraving of the Battle of Wolfenbüttel from the Theatrum Europaeum

In the spring of 1641, Wahl was recalled from Westphalia by the Elector of Bavaria. By April, he was in the Upper Palatinate, and on May 1, he took over command of the Bavarian troops attached to the main Imperial army from Franz von Mercy in Zeitz. On June 29, he participated in the Battle of Wolfenbüttel, a defeat against Swedish, French, and Lüneburg forces. He held Ottavio Piccolomini, advisor to the Imperial commander-in-chief Archduke Leopold Wilhelm, responsible for the loss.

Wahl defended Leopold Wilhelm against criticism from Elector Maximilian and spoke out against the influence of "foreign" commanders like Piccolomini, stating: "I believe that if we had German leaders, everything would go well." Subsequently, by capturing surrounding towns such as Osterwieck, Schladen, Hornburg, and Liebenburg, and through successful cavalry skirmishes against enemy units, Imperial and Bavarian forces managed to compel the enemy to abandon the Siege of Wolfenbüttel in early September. Largely through Wahl's efforts, the Peace of Goslar, concluded in early 1642, was negotiated with the war, weary Welf rulers, including Augustus II of Brunswick-Wolfenbüttel. Throughout the winter, Wahl's troops were quartered along the Unstrut River and in the County of Schwarzburg-Sondershausen.

In March 1642, Wahl left the main Imperial army and headed for the Rhine to support General Hatzfeldt against French and Hessian forces commanded by Guébriant and Kaspar von Eberstein; these forces had defeated Imperial troops near Kempen in January and occupied large parts of the Electorate of Cologne situated on the left bank of the Rhine. Delayed by illness, Wahl was unable to confer with Hatzfeldt until May. His troops arrived just in time to compel the enemy to abandon the Siege of Lechenich on May 24. On June 12, Hatzfeldt and Wahl crossed the Rhine and entrenched their troops near Zons.

They received reinforcements from the Spanish under Francisco de Melo, who advanced to Wessem on the Meuse. Consequently, the French and Hessians withdrew from Grevenbroich to Uerdingen. At the same time, their ally, the Dutch Stadtholder Frederick Henry of Orange, also crossed the Meuse and established a camp near Rheinberg. Hatzfeldt and Wahl unsuccessfully urged Melo to advance further; he was content merely to prevent the Prince of Orange and the French from threatening the Spanish Netherlands. Because the French and Hessians held well-fortified positions, the Imperial and Bavarian forces, save for regular cavalry raids led by Johann von Werth, who had been released from French captivity, and struggled greatly to supply their troops within a confined area.

When their adversaries recrossed the Rhine near Wesel in early October, Hatzfeldt also crossed the river further south to cover Franconia. Wahl and Werth remained behind and captured Düren on October 29 following a week-long siege. Wahl's soldiers violated the terms of free withdrawal granted to the garrison, alleging that the troops had concealed stolen church vestments. They caught up with the retreating soldiers near Merzenich and forced them to enlist, that is, to join their own ranks an action for which Hatzfeldt and the Elector of Cologne reprimanded them. As a result of the Imperial defeat by the Swedes at Breitenfeld in early November, a large portion of Wahl's troops was also redeployed eastward to the Upper Palatinate to support the Imperial army in Bohemia and to guard against a potential junction of Swedish and French forces.

=== Governor of Ingolstadt ===
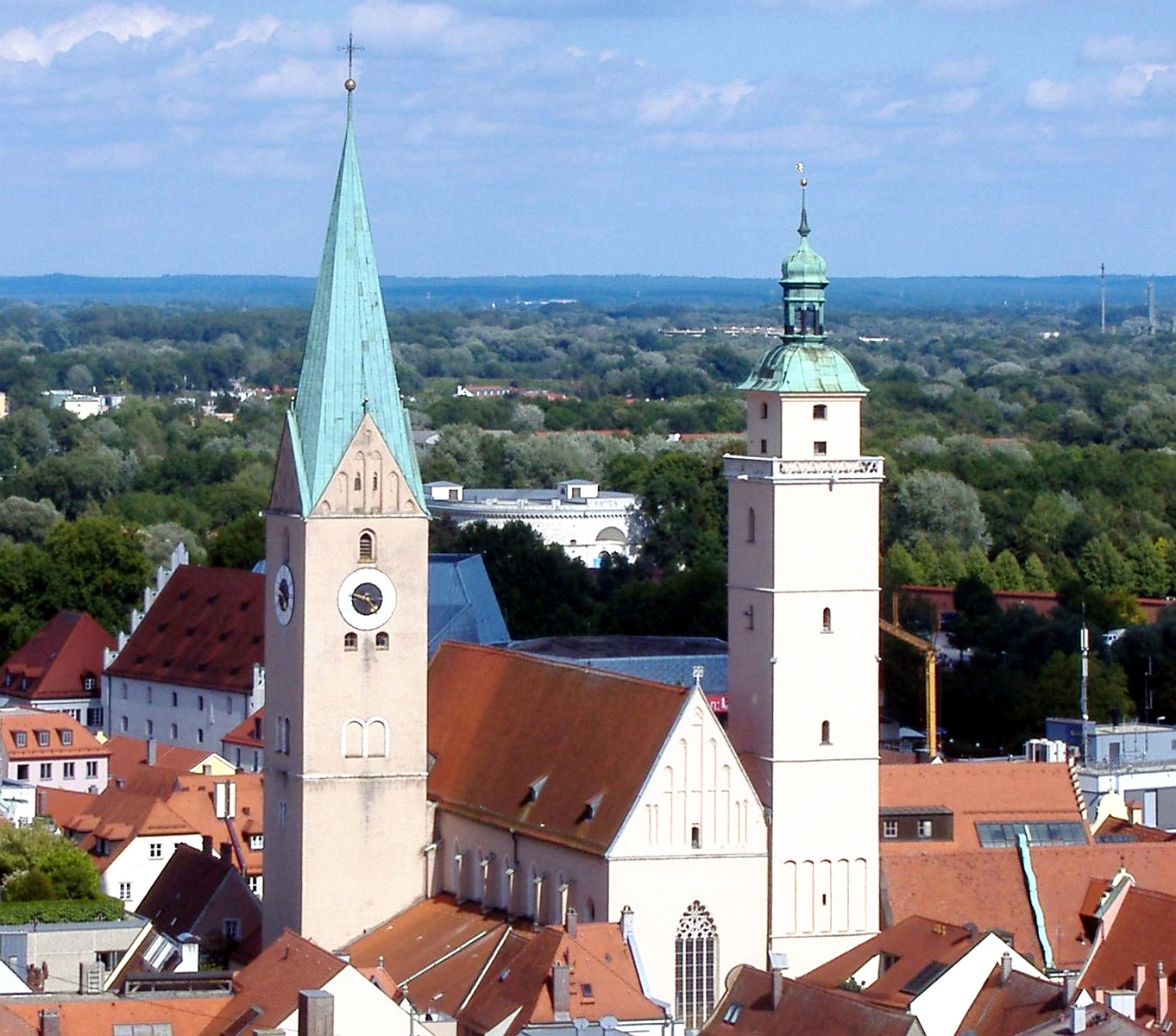
Wahl's burial place: St. Moritz Church in Ingolstadt

The following year, Elector Ferdinand of Cologne sought to appoint Wahl, in place of Hatzfeldt, as general commanding the Westphalian Circle, but he failed to secure a majority among the Circle's estates. Duke Wolfgang Wilhelm of Palatinate-Neuburg in Düsseldorf, in particular, opposed an electoral candidate who might establish Cologne's hegemony within the Circle.

Wahl returned from the Electoral-Cologne court in Bonn in May 1643 without a new appointment and was summoned to the Upper Palatinate to defend Electoral Bavaria. Due to health issues, he relinquished supreme command of the Bavarian army, a role assumed by Franz von Mercy, and instead became Governor of Ingolstadt, where he died a year later and was buried in St. Moritz Church.

His epitaph bears the inscription: "Viator, vis plura? In campo, quantum bello praestare solet dux centimanus, tantum praestitit unimanus." Translated, it reads: "Wayfarer, do you wish to know more? In the field, he achieved with a single hand as much as a commander of a hundred men is wont to achieve."

=== Family ===
On February 28, 1639, Wahl married Esther Juliane von Herzau in Prague. Their son was Ferdinand Franz Albrecht von der Wahl (died 1703), who acquired the Aurolzmünster estate in the Innviertel region around 1676 and built a magnificent palace there. The former ceremonial hall on the top floor of Aurolzmünster Palace features a ceiling painting depicting the entry of Joachim Christian von der Wahl into Olympus.

Joachim Christian's brother, Johann Joachim von der Wahl, (Note: likely born in 1604 in Niederröblingen near Allstedt) remained a Protestant but also served Catholic powers; he was the city commander of Rheine in the Bishopric of Münster from 1641 to 1648. In his 1896 entry on Wahl for the Allgemeine Deutsche Biographie, Bernhard von Poten conflated the two brothers into a single person. Although Field Marshal Wahl consistently referred to himself as Joachim Christian in letters and other personal records, the incorrect first name, borrowed from his brother, had already been used in 1850 by Baron von Schönhueb in a biographical account of Wahl that von Poten subsequently cited as a source.

== Sources ==
- Bernhard von Poten: Wahl, Johann Joachim Graf von. In: Allgemeine Deutsche Biographie (ADB). Band 40, Duncker & Humblot, Leipzig 1896, S. 592 f.
- Johann Heilmann: Kriegsgeschichte von Bayern, Franken, Pfalz und Schwaben von 1506 bis 1651: II. Band, 2. Abteilung. Kriegsgeschichte von 1634–1651. Cotta, München 1868, S. 1110 (books.google.de).
- Historisches Museum Köthen, Inventar-Nr. V S 677c (diglib.hab.de).
- Bernd Warlich: Wahl, Joachim Christian (I). In: Der Dreißigjährige Krieg in Selbstzeugnissen, Chroniken und Berichten. Retrieved 13 March 2023.
- Peter Engerisser: Von Kronach nach Nördlingen: Der Dreissigjährige Krieg in Franken, Schwaben und der Oberpfalz. Späthling, 2004. S. 134 ff.
- Martin Zeiller: Soest. In: Matthäus Merian (Hrsg.): Topographia Westphaliae (= Topographia Germaniae. Band 8). 1. Auflage. Matthaeus Merian, Frankfurt am Main 1647, S. 55 (Volltext [Wikisource]).
- Joseph Bergmann: Medaillen auf berühmte und ausgezeichnete Männer des oesterreichischen Kaiserstaates vom XVI. bis zum XIX. Jahrhunderte. Band 2. Tendler & Schaefer, 1857. S. 354 f.
- Bernd Warlich: Wahl, Joachim Christian (II). In: Der Dreißigjährige Krieg in Selbstzeugnissen, Chroniken und Berichten. Retrieved 13 March 2023.
- Kommission für bayerische Landesgeschichte (Hrsg.): Zeitschrift für bayerische Landesgeschichte. Band 69, Ausgabe 2. Beck, München 2006. S. 573.
- Johann Heilmann: Kriegsgeschichte von Bayern, Franken, Pfalz und Schwaben von 1506 bis 1651. II. Band, 2. Abteilung: Kriegsgeschichte von 1634–1651. Cotta, München 1868, S. 630–631 (books.google.de).
- Bernd Warlich: Wahl, Joachim Christian (III). In: Der Dreißigjährige Krieg in Selbstzeugnissen, Chroniken und Berichten. Retrieved 13 March 2023.
- Johann Heilmann: Kriegsgeschichte von Bayern, Franken, Pfalz und Schwaben von 1506 bis 1651. II. Band, 2. Abteilung: Kriegsgeschichte von 1634–1651. Cotta, München 1868, S. 637 ().
- Joachim F. Foerster: Kurfürst Ferdinand von Köln. Die Politik seiner Stifter in den Jahren 1634–1650. Aschendorff, Münster 1976, ISBN 3-402-05625-9, S. 211–216.
- Helmut Lahrkamp: Jan von Werth. Sein Leben nach archivalischen Quellenzeugnissen. Verlag der Löwe, Köln 1962. S. 125 f.
- Christine Steininger: Die Deutschen Inschriften. Band 99: Die Inschriften der Stadt Ingolstadt. Reichert, Wiesbaden 2017.
- Kerstin Petermann: Aurolzmünster – Das Versailles des Innviertels. In: Grenzenlos – Geschichte der Menschen am Inn. Katalog zur ersten Bayerisch-Oberösterreichischen Landesausstellung 2004, Asbach – Passau – Reichersberg – Schärding, 23. April bis 2 November 2004. Retrieved 13 March 2023.
- Georg Dehio: Handbuch der deutschen Kunstdenkmäler, Abteilung 2, Band 2: Österreich, II. De Gruyter, Berlin 1935. S. 439.
- Kommission für bayerische Landesgeschichte (Hrsg.): Zeitschrift für bayerische Landesgeschichte. Band 21. Beck, München 1958, S. 486–487 (digitale-sammlungen.de)
- Inventare der nichtstaatlichen Archive Westfalens. Band 16. Aschendorff, Münster 1999, S. 226 (google.de)
