= Werth =

Werth is a surname. Notable people with the surname include:

- Alexander Werth (1901–1969), Russian-British writer and journalist
- Dennis Werth (born 1952), baseball first baseman and outfielder
- Erik Werth, TV news producer
- Henrik Werth (1881–1952), Hungarian general
- Isabell Werth (born 1969), German equestrian
- Jayson Werth (born 1979), American baseball outfielder
- Johann von Werth (1591–1652), German general
- Joseph Werth (born 1952), Bishop of Siberia and the Russian Far East
- Kurt Werth (1896–1983), German children's books illustrator
- Léon Werth (1878–1955), French author and art critic
- Nicolas Werth (born in 1950), French historian, son of Alexander Werth

== See also ==
- Wert, a surname
