= Battle of Kempen =

1642 battle of the Thirty Years' War

- Part of the Thirty Years' War
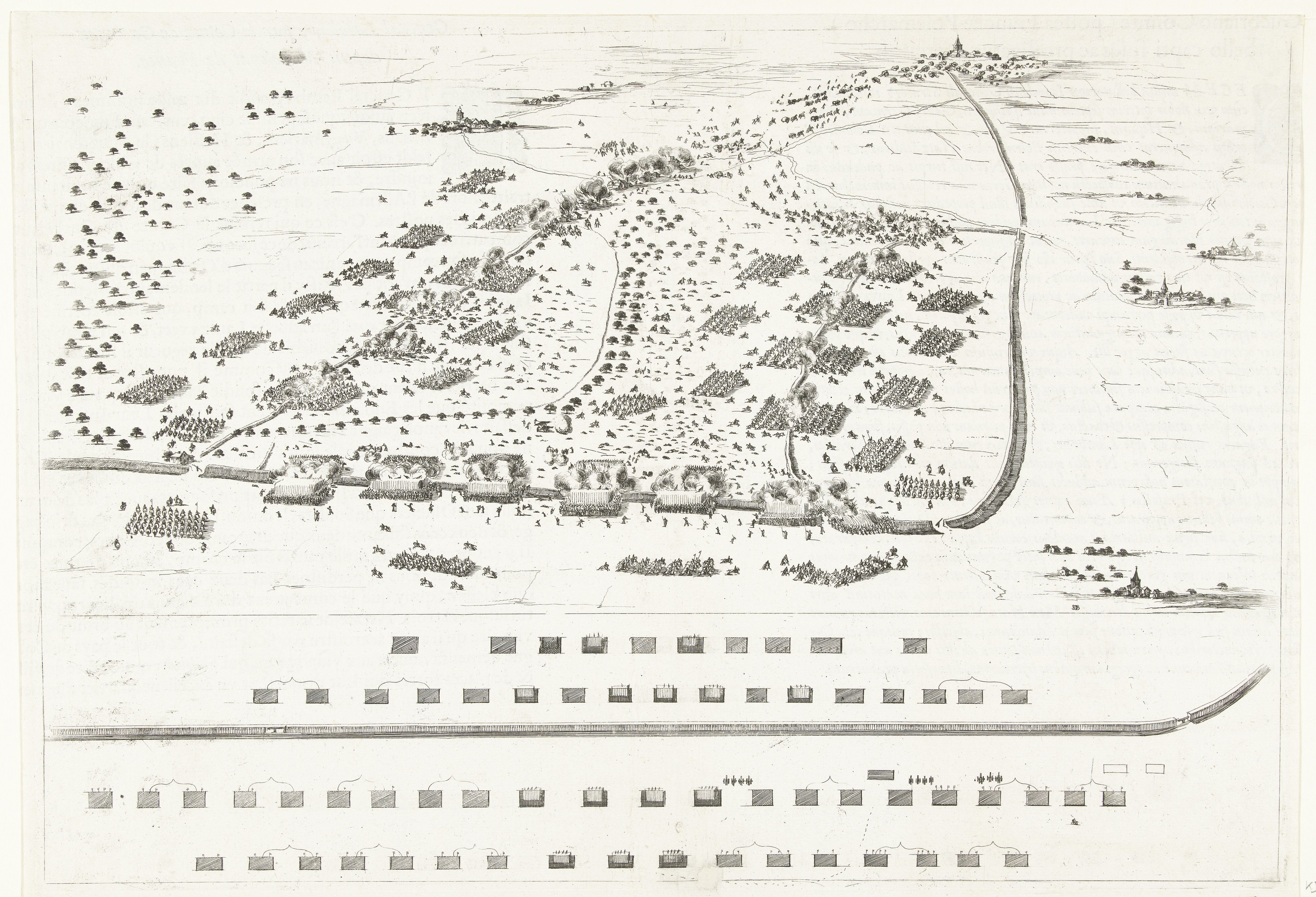
- Battle of Kempen
Date	17 January 1642
Location	Kempen, Germany
Result	Franco-Hessian victory

Belligerents
France; Hesse-Kassel	Holy Roman Empire

Commanders and leaders
(Kingdom of France) de Guébriant; Kaspar von Eberstein	(Holy Roman Empire) de Lamboy (POW) (Holy Roman Empire) H. von Mercy (POW)

Strength
9,500, 23 guns	9,000, 6 guns

Casualties and losses
660 killed or wounded	c. 7,000 killed, wounded or captured

The Battle of Kempen (Note: Also known as the Battle of the Kempen Heights or Battle of Hückelsmay.) took place on 17 January 1642 during the Thirty Years' War, outside Kempen, Germany. A combined Franco-Hessian army, led by de Guébriant and von Eberstein respectively, defeated an Imperial force under General de Lamboy.

The Imperial army disintegrated, with the majority either captured or killed. Defeat ended Imperial plans for an invasion of Champagne, and temporarily secured French-Hessian control of the Lower Rhine.

== Background ==
In late 1641, Lamboy and his Imperial army of 9,000 took up winter quarters in Kempen, then part of the Electorate of Cologne, an ally of Emperor Ferdinand. He was instructed to await the arrival of reinforcements under Melchior Graf von Hatzfeldt. Once combined, they would invade the French province of Champagne, while the Spanish Army of Flanders simultaneously entered Picardy.

In response, Cardinal Richelieu, then Chief minister of France, recalled the French Army of Germany, commanded by Guébriant, from supporting Swedish troops in Northern Germany. The French army comprised around 2,000 infantry and 3,500 cavalry, largely composed of German mercenaries known as Weimarians. Like Guébriant, they followed Bernard of Saxe-Weimar until his death in 1639, after which they were taken into French service.

Key locations mentioned in text (Dark Green = modern state of North Rhine-Westphalia)

In December 1641, Guébriant linked up with Eberstein's army of 4,000 Hessians, split equally between infantry and cavalry. By this stage of the war, the limiting factor in any campaign was securing supplies and forage for men and horses. In order to deny these to Lamboy, on 11 January 1642 the Franco-Hessian army crossed the Rhine at Wesel, and began to ravage lands around his base. On 15 January, the French cavalry beat off a reconnaissance party led by Heinrich von Mercy, brother of Bavarian general Franz.

Guébriant learned Hatzfeldt had reached Cologne with 7,000 men, and decided to attack Lamboy before the two could combine. Although many of his men were unavailable due to sickness or lack of weapons, Lamboy ignored instructions to avoid combat until joined by Hatzfeldt. Instead, he positioned his troops in a triangle on the heights south of Kempen, along a line running from Hüls to St Tönis. With a ditch covering his positions in front and the infantry placed behind hedges and in buildings, Lamboy was confident he could beat off any assault.

The Franco-Hessian army were short of supplies, which combined with Hatzfeldt's presence meant Guébriant had to act quickly, or not at all. On 16 January, his own troops concentrated around Linn in preparation for an attack, while Eberstein's men moved up from Wesel to the nearby village of Uerdingen. (Note: Hüls, Linn, and Uerdingen are now all part of the modern city of Krefeld.) To speed up progress, the heavy guns were left behind.

== Battle ==
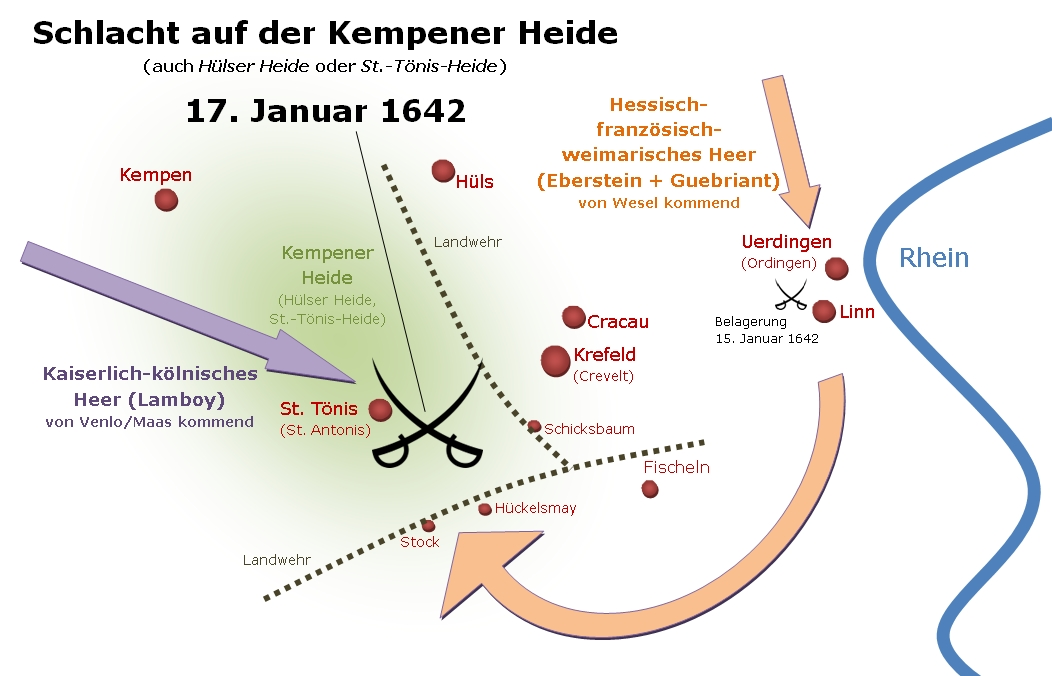
Battle of Kempen 17 January 1642

The battle began with a short artillery bombardment, while Guébriant formed his infantry into three columns. These would attack simultaneously all along the Imperial lines, opening a breach for Eberstein's cavalry to storm into their rear. The initial assault met fierce resistance before the French captured part of the Imperial line, moved up their guns, and began firing at close range. At the same time, the Hessian cavalry routed their opponents, who fled; deprived of their support, and unable to respond to the French artillery, the Imperial infantry surrendered.

Although some 2,000 cavalry escaped and rejoined Hatzfeldt, the Imperial army was largely destroyed. An estimated 2,000 became casualties, while Lamboy and Mercy were among the 4,000 to 5,000 captured, along with the artillery and baggage. French losses were some 160 dead, plus 500 wounded.

== Aftermath ==
The destruction of Lamboy's army ended plans for a joint Spanish-Imperial invasion of Northern France, and Hatzfeld withdrew his troops to the fortress city of Jülich. Victory allowed Guébriant to base himself in the Electorate of Cologne, from where he could threaten both the Spanish Army of Flanders and Imperial/Bavarian forces in southern Germany.

Over the next months, the French captured important towns in the region, including Kempen, Neuss and Düren. To contain the Franco-Hessian advance, Bavarian troops under Joachim Christian von Wahl joined Hatzfeldt in May. Together, they lifted the siege of Lechenich and took camp at Zons while the French and Hessians entrenched themselves at Uerdingen. Shortage of supplies forced the opposing armies largely to inactivity throughout the summer except for cavalry raids by the Bavarian general Johann von Werth. Despite his achievements, Guébriant was forced to remain in the Rhineland and distract the Imperial-Bavarian forces, preventing his army from undertaking further offensive operations.

Most of the prisoners were quickly exchanged, although Mercy remained in French custody until September 1643, while Lamboy was not released until six months later. Guébriant was promoted Marshal of France after the battle; in 1643, he led his troops south into Baden-Württemberg, and was killed at the siege of Rottweil in November.

== Sources ==
- Clodfelter, M. (2017). Warfare and Armed Conflicts: A Statistical Encyclopedia of Casualty and Other Figures, 1492-2015 (4th ed.). Jefferson, North Carolina: McFarland. ISBN 978-0786474707.
- Foerster, Joachim F. (1976). Kurfürst Ferdinand von Köln. Die Politik seiner Stifter in den Jahren 1634–1650 (in German). Münster: Aschendorff. ISBN 3-402-05625-9.
- Guthrie, William. P. (2003). The Later Thirty Years War: From the Battle of Wittstock to the Treaty of Westphalia. Westport, Connecticut: Greenwood Press. ISBN 0-313-32408-5.
- Noailles, Vicomte Amblard-Marie-Raymond-Amédée de (1912). Épisodes de la guerre de trente ans: Le maréchal de Guébriant (1602 a 1643) (in French). Perrin.
- Parrott, David (2001). Richelieu's Army: War, Government and Society in France, 1624–1642. Cambridge University Press. ISBN 0-521-79209-6.
- Périni, Colonel Hardy de (1902). Batailles françaises. 3e série 1620 to 1642 (in French). Flammarion.
- Périni, Colonel Hardy de (1904). Batailles françaises. 4e série 1643 to 1671 (in French). Flammarion.
- Wilson, P. (2011). The Thirty Years War: Europe's Tragedy. Belknap Press. ISBN 978-0674062313.
