= Reinhold von Rosen =

17th-century German soldier

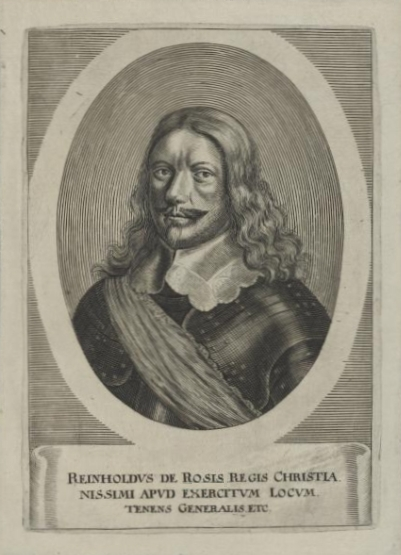
- Reinhold von Rosen
- Born: 1605; Straupe, Latvia
- Died: 8 December 1667 (aged 62) Dettwiller, France
- Buried: St Jacques, Dettwiller
- Conflicts: Polish–Swedish War (1621–1625); Polish–Swedish War (1626–1629); Thirty Years War; First Breitenfeld; Lützen; Tuttlingen; Freiburg; Herbsthausen (POW)

Reinhold von Rosen (1605 – 8 December 1667) was a member of the Baltic German nobility from Straupe in modern Latvia, who served first Sweden, then France, during the Thirty Years' War.

== Personal details ==
Reinhold von Rosen was born around 1605 in Straupe, then in Livonia, now part of modern Latvia. son of Otto von Rosen and his wife Catharina von Klebeck.

== Career ==
Reinhold served Gustavus Adolphus of Sweden in his youth. In 1632, at the Battle of Lützen in which Gustavus Adolphus fell, he commanded a cavalry regiment. He then served Bernard of Saxe-Weimar On 17 July 1635 he successfully defended the Protestant town of Zweibrücken menaced by imperial troops. When Bernard died in 1639, he and the entire Weimar army went into French service and served under Condé and Turenne. He fought under Turenne in his defeat against Mercy at the Battle of Herbsthausen and was taken prisoner.

== Marriages ==
Rosen married three times. He had a daughter, Marie-Sophie von Rosen (1638–1686), who married Conrad von Rosen.

== Death ==
Rosen died on 18 December 1667 in the castle he had built in Dettwiller.
