= Weerth =

Weerth is a surname. Notable people with the surname include:

- Georg Weerth (1822–1856), German writer and poet
- Ernest de Weerth (1894–1967), French-American theatrical designer
- Ferdinand Weerth (1774–1836), German pastor

== See also ==
- Werth
