= De Wert =

De Wert is a surname. Notable people with the surname include:

- Giaches de Wert (1535–1596), Franco-Flemish composer
- Guido De Wert, retired academic and medical researcher
- Jean de Wert, French name for Johann von Werth (1591–1652), German cavalry general
- Lucas de Wert, half of Lucas & Steve, a Dutch house music duo formed in 2010
- Richard De Wert (1931–1951), US Navy hospital corpsman posthumously awarded the Medal of Honor

== See also ==
- Wert (disambiguation)
