= Wert =

Wert may refer to:

- Wert (surname), surname
- Wertpapierkennnummer or Wert, a German securities identification code
- WERT, a commercial AM radio station in Van Wert, Ohio, U.S.

== See also ==
- De Wert (disambiguation)
- Van Wert (disambiguation)
