= Battle of Wolfenbüttel =

1641 battle of the Thirty Years' War

- Part of the Thirty Years' War
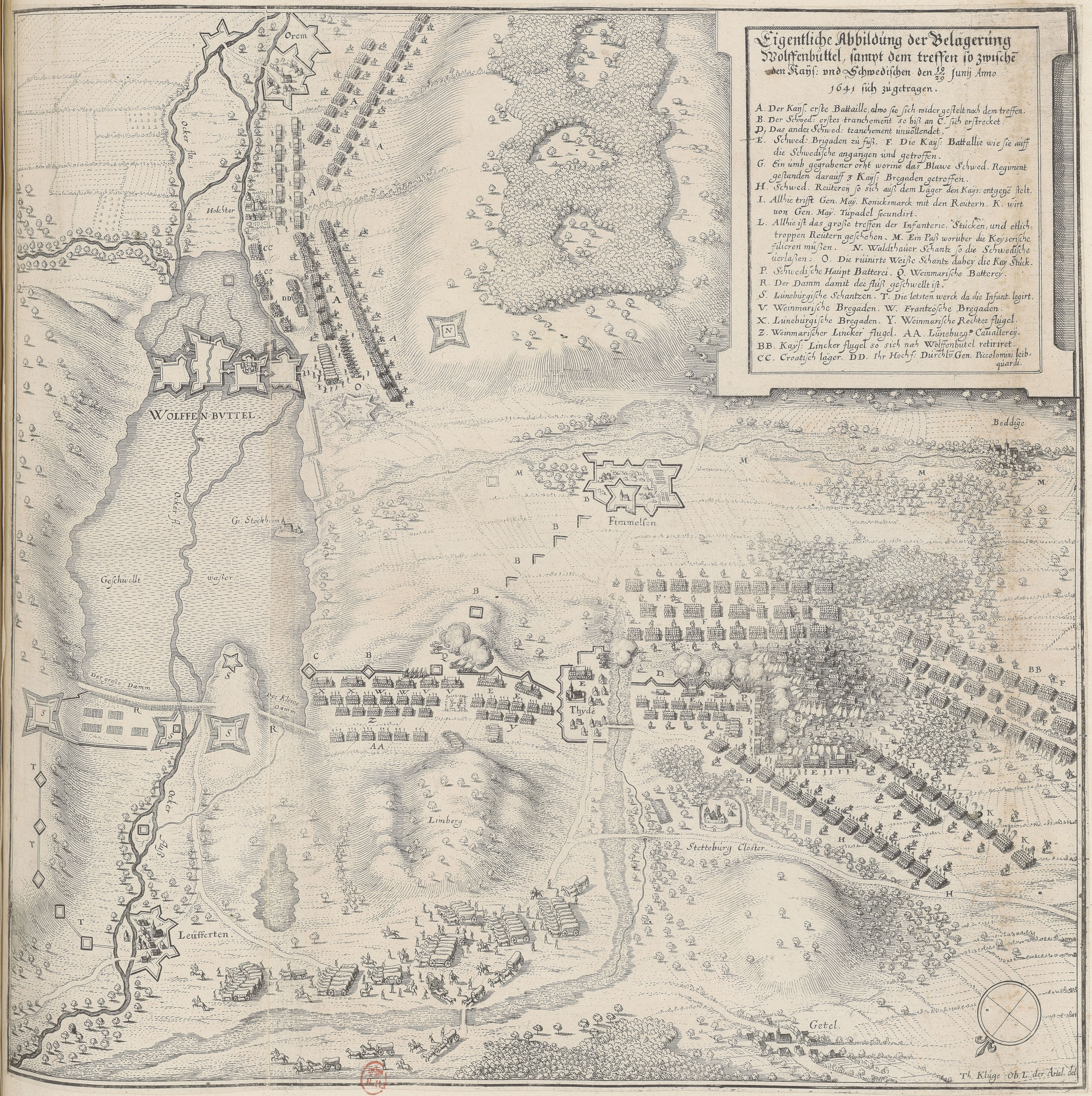
- Contemporary engraving
Date	29 June 1641
Location	Wolfenbüttel, Germany
Result	Franco-Swedish victory

Belligerents
(yes) Swedish Empire; France; Brunswick-Lüneburg	Holy Roman Empire; Bavaria

Commanders and leaders
(Swedish Empire) Carl Gustaf Wrangel (Swedish Empire) Hans Christoff von Königsmarck (Kingdom of France) de Guébriant; Hans Caspar von Klitzing	(Holy Roman Empire) Archduke Leopold Wilhelm (Holy Roman Empire) Ottavio Piccolomini (Electorate of Bavaria) Johann von Reuschenberg (Electorate of Bavaria) Joachim von Wahl (Electorate of Bavaria) Franz von Mercy

Strength
c. 26,000, (Note: Split 13,000 Swedes, 6,000 Bernardines 7,000 Guelphs and Lüneburgers) 31 guns	22,000, 11 guns

Casualties and losses
2,000	3,000 dead or wounded, 7 guns captured

The Battle of Wolfenbüttel took place on 29 June 1641 during the Thirty Years' War outside Wolfenbüttel, Lower Saxony. A Swedish army supported by its German allies was besieging the town, and defeated an attempt by Imperial forces to relieve it.

== Background ==
Wolfenbüttel, occupied by Imperial forces, was a strategically insignificant town, but it held great value to the Swedes' Guelph allies. A Guelph army under Hans Caspar von Klitzing had blockaded the Imperial garrison under Johann Ernst, Baron von Ruischenberg since the previous autumn, but its 7,000 troops had been too small a force to reduce the town. Facing growing uncertainty in the wake of the death of General Johan Banér and mutinous troops following a year of inaction and failure, the Swedes needed to do something to ensure Guelph loyalty and prove to other German Protestant allies that they were still a reliable partner. Thus, they decided to assist in the Guelph siege of Wolfenbüttel. Hearing word of the Swedish advance, an Imperial army under Archduke Leopold Wilhelm of Austria and Ottavio Piccolomini raced to meet them. The race was essentially a draw. The Swedes under Carl Gustaf Wrangel and their Bernardine allies led by French general Jean-Baptiste Budes, Comte de Guébriant joined Klitzing's troops on 28 June, and the Imperial army arrived just two hours later.

== Battle ==
The besiegers had created a fortified camp that was too hard to take by frontal assault, so Leopold Wilhelm ordered flanking attacks on both sides. Piccolomini's cavalry attacked the Swedish left, but was driven back with light casualties. Meanwhile, the Bavarians under Joachim Christian von Wahl attacked the Swedish right through a woods containing a small redoubt manned by Banér's legendary "Old Blue" Swedish regiment. The Bavarians took heavy casualties storming the woods but finally succeeded in taking the redoubt from the "Old Blue," only to be driven back by a cavalry counterattack dispatched by Guébriant from the main camp. At this point, Leopold Wilhelm decided to withdraw, having taken around 3,000 casualties in total, although the Swedes had also paid a heavy price for their victory, having lost 2,000 men, with the heaviest toll coming out of the most experienced and veteran troops of the "Old Blue" regiment.

== Sources ==
- Guthrie, William (2003). The Later Thirty Years War: From the Battle of Wittstock to the Treaty of Westphalia. Greenwood Publishing Group. ISBN 978-0-313-32408-6.
