= Battle of Tuttlingen =

1643 Thirty Years' War battle

- Part of the Thirty Years' War and the Franco-Spanish War (1635–59)
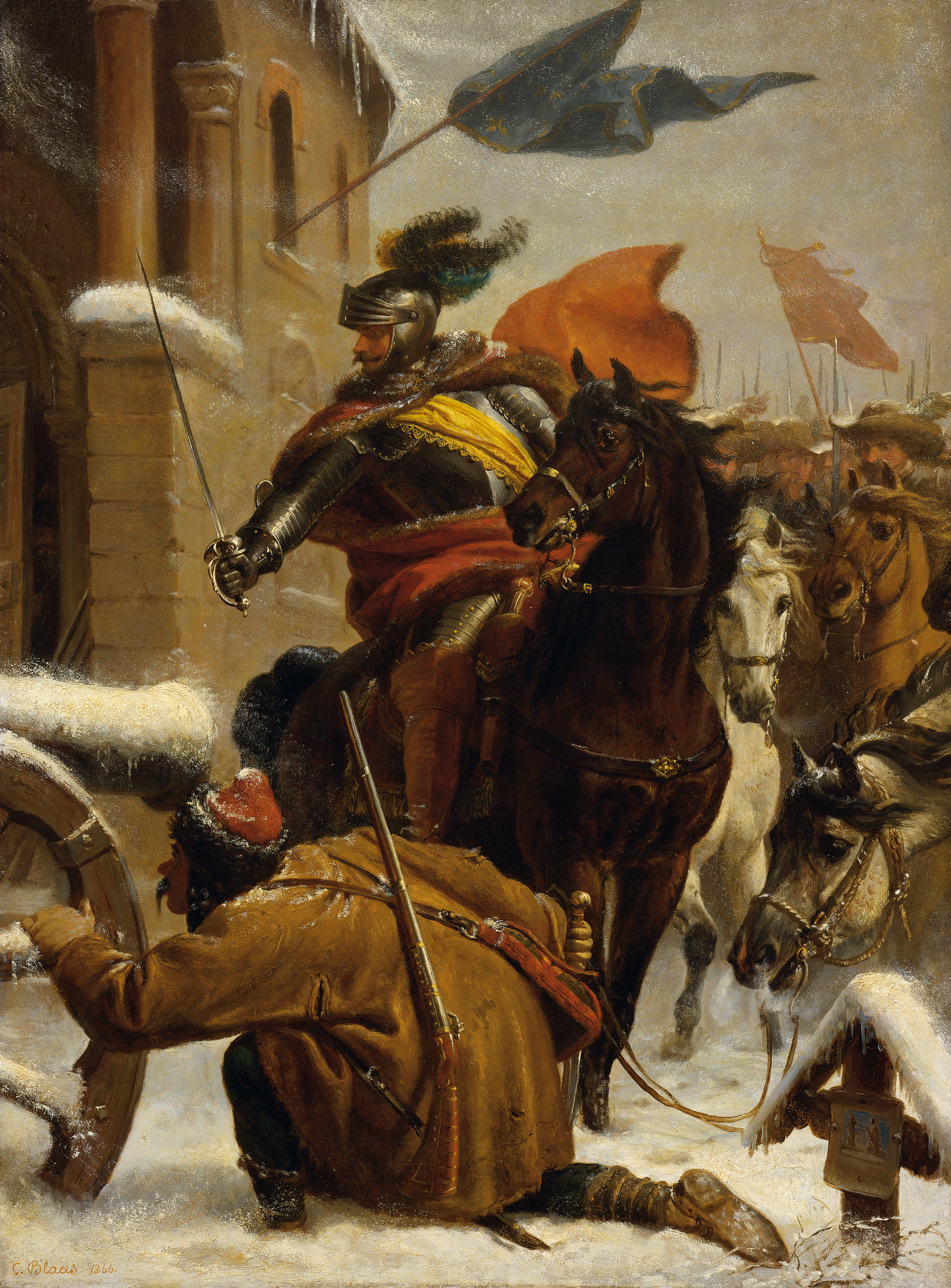
- Johann de Werth's Überfall bei Tuttlingen by Karl von Blaas (oil on canvas, 1866)
Date	24–25 November 1643
Location	Tuttlingen (present-day Germany) 47°58′52″N 8°49′14″E
Result	Imperial-Bavarian-Spanish victory

Belligerents
Holy Roman Empire; Electorate of Bavaria (Spain) Spanish Empire; Duchy of Lorraine	Kingdom of France

Commanders and leaders
(Holy Roman Empire) Melchior von Hatzfeldt (Electorate of Bavaria) Franz von Mercy (Electorate of Bavaria) Johann von Werth (Electorate of Bavaria) Kaspar von Mercy (Spain) Juan de Vivero; Charles of Lorraine	(Kingdom of France) Josias Rantzau (surrendered) (Kingdom of France) Reinhold von Rosen (Kingdom of France) Georg von Taupadel

Strength
15,000–22,000	15,000–18,000; 10 guns

Casualties and losses
1,000	7,000–10,500; 10 guns

The Battle of Tuttlingen was part of the Thirty Years' War and was fought in Tuttlingen on 24 November 1643 between a French-led army under Marshal Josias Rantzau and the forces of the Holy Roman Empire, Bavaria, Spain, and the exiled Duke of Lorraine, all led by Franz von Mercy. The French army—including the so-called Weimarans or Bernhardines, German troops once in service of Bernard of Saxe-Weimar—was wiped out in a surprise attack in heavy snowfall, reversing French strategic gains since 1638. The French court suppressed news of the defeat and it remains largely unknown today, even among historians of the war.

== Prelude ==
In early November the French-Weimarian forces had besieged Rottweil to secure winter quarters along the Danube at Tuttlingen. They captured Rottweil on 18 November, but their commander Guébriant was mortally wounded in the siege. His successor Rantzau who just had arrived with reinforcements from Lorraine was despised by officers who originated from the former German army of Bernard of Saxe-Weimar. Outlying detachments of the French were posted at Mühlingen and Möhringen. With the French inactive and his own army reinforced by Imperial troops under Hatzfeld and Lorrainer troops under the exiled Duke Charles, Mercy convinced the other generals to agree to a surprise attack on the French encampment. To maximize surprise, the Imperials approached from the south-east instead of further to the north, where the Danube and the French garrison at Rottweil blocked their way.

== Battle ==
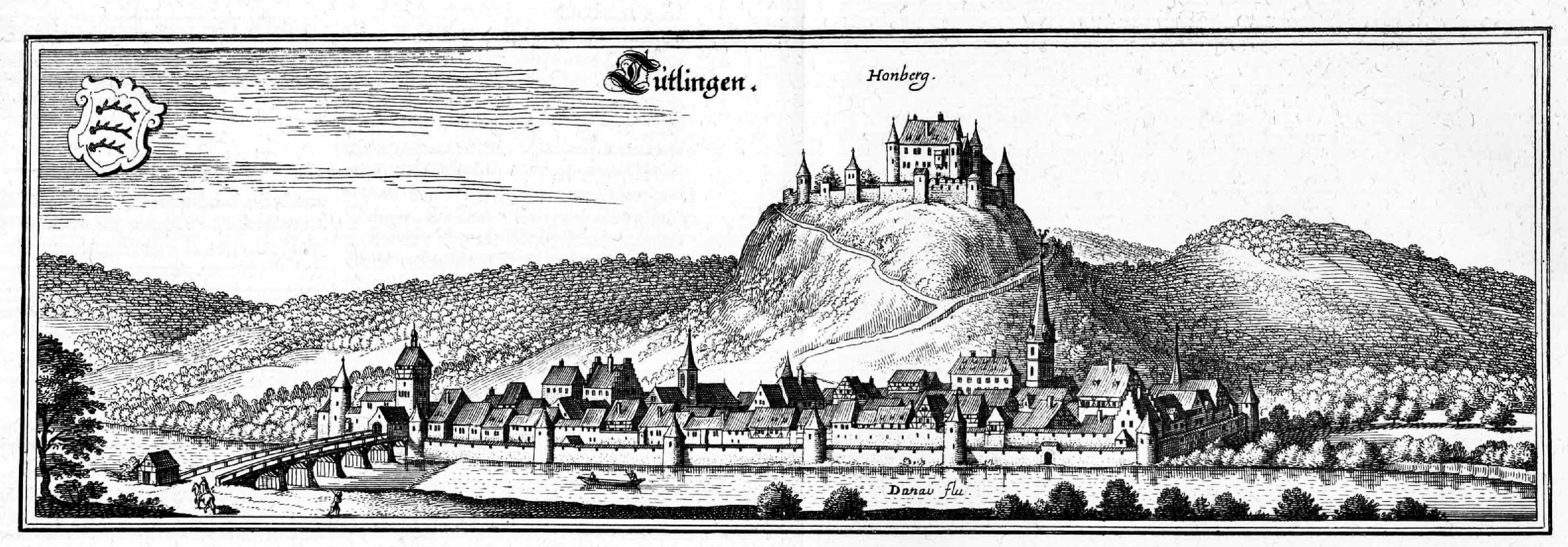
Tutlingen - excerpt from Topographia Sueviae (Schwaben) by Matthäus Merian the Elder

At mid-afternoon on 24 November, Johann von Werth led 2,000 cavalry in the first assault group against Möhringen and achieved instant success, wiping out a French infantry regiment of 500 men, including Spanish prisoners of war. The Bavarian dragoons captured the French pickets posted near Tuttlingen, allowing the Imperials to seize with minimal opposition the lightly defended French artillery park in the cemetery outside town. Heavy snowfall contributed to the surprise. The Weimarian cavalry in Mühlheim under Reinhold von Rosen attempted to reinforce the French at Tuttlingen but were intercepted and defeated by Mercy's brother Kaspar. Kaspar then destroyed the Weimarian infantry remaining at Mühlheim.

The French cavalry fled the scene. The captured guns were used to bombard the French infantry in Tuttlingen and Möhringen, who capitulated the next day along with their commander Rantzau without losing a single man killed. The fighting lasted for a day and a half, not so much due to the effectiveness of Franco-Weimarian resistance but because of the disorganized and isolated nature of their detachments. The 2,000-strong French garrison in Rottweil surrendered a week later.

Rantzau's army largely ceased to exist, with 4,500 survivors retreating back across the Rhine River into Alsace. Moreover, Mercy held Rantzau, seven other generals, 9 colonels, 10 guns, the baggage, the officer's wives, and seven thousand French troops captive. Among the prisoners was the Duke of Montausier. Another 4,000 lay dead or wounded. The Weimarian army was permanently crippled by this disaster and the French were reduced to the positions they had held five years earlier. The French court minimized the defeat and it has remained largely unknown ever since.

== Sources ==
- Croxton, Derek. "The Prosperity of Arms Is Never Continual: Military Intelligence, Surprise, and Diplomacy in 1640s Germany." The Journal of Military History, Vol. 64, No. 4 (October 2000), pp. 981–1003.
- Wilson, Peter H. (2009). Europe's Tragedy: A History of the Thirty Years War. Allen Lane. ISBN 978-0-7139-9592-3.
- Bodart, Gaston (1908). Militär-historisches Kriegs-Lexikon (1618–1905).
