= Wert (surname) =

Wert is a surname. Notable people with the surname include:

- Don Wert (born 1938), American former third baseman in Major League Baseball
- Giaches de Wert, Flemish composer of the Renaissance, active in Italy
- J. Howard Wert (19th century), American author and collector
- Jeffry D. Wert (21st century), American historian and author
- José Ignacio Wert (21st century), Spanish sociologist and politician, former Minister of Education.
- Ray Wert (21st century), American online publication editor

== See also ==
- Wert (disambiguation)
