= Franz von Mercy =

German general during the Thirty Years' War, fought for the Holy Roman Empire

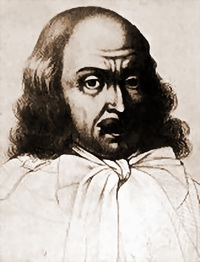
- Born: 1597; Longwy, Lorraine, Holy Roman Empire
- Died: 3 August 1645 (aged 48); Alerheim, County of Oettingen, Holy Roman Empire
- Resting place: Ingolstadt; 48°45′49″N 11°25′29″E
- Parents: Pierre Ernest de Mercy (d. 1619) (father); Anne du Hautoy (mother)

Military service
- Allegiance: Holy Roman Empire; Electorate of Bavaria
- Branch: Imperial Army
- Years of service: 1618–1645
- Rank: Generalfeldmarschall
- Conflicts: Thirty Years' War: • Battle of Breitenfeld (1631) (WIA); • Relief of Konstanz (1633); • Siege of Colmar (1636); • Siege of Dole (1636); • Siege of Héricourt (1637); • Battle against Reinhold von Rosen (1637); • Battle of Wolfenbüttel (1641); • Battle of Tuttlingen (1643); • Siege of Überlingen (1644); • Blockade of Hohentwiel Castle (1644); • Siege of Freiburg (1644); • Battle of Freiburg (1644); • Battle of Herbsthausen (1645); • Battle of Nördlingen (1645) †

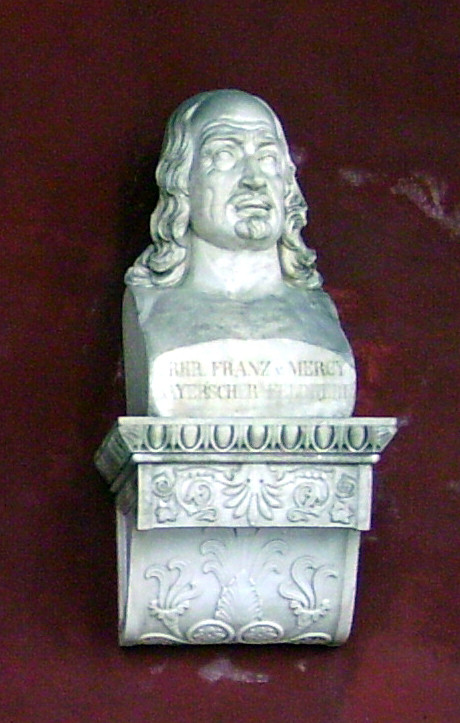
Bust of Mercy on display in the Ruhmeshalle in Munich.

Franz Freiherr von Mercy (or Merci), Lord of Mandre and Collenburg (c. 1597 – 3 August 1645), was a German field marshal in the Thirty Years' War who fought with distinction for the Imperial side and was commander-in-chief of the Bavarian army from 1643 to 1645. In that role, he destroyed a French army at Tuttlingen (1643), stalemated another at Freiburg (1644), destroyed a third French army at Herbsthausen (1645) and was killed at the Second Battle of Nördlingen (1645).

== Biography ==
=== Early life and career ===
Franz von Mercy was born at Longwy around 1597. His parents were Pierre Ernest de Mercy († 1619), governor of Longwy and Chamberlain of Duke Charles III of Lorraine, and Anne du Hautoy. Of his many siblings, his brothers Heinrich (1596–1659) and Kaspar (1600–1644) also became generals in the Imperial or Bavarian army. Franz entered military service most likely in the army of the Catholic League around the beginning of the Thirty Years' War and changed over to imperial service later on. In 1625 he held the rank of captain in the regiment of Hannibal von Schauenburg and in 1626 he was mentioned as chamberlain of Archduke Leopold V of Tyrol.

By 1630 he had attained the rank of Obristwachtmeister, and after distinguishing himself at the first Battle of Breitenfeld, where the Imperial army was destroyed and Mercy wounded, he commanded a regiment of foot with the rank of Obrist on the Rhine. He repelled a Swedish attack led by Gustaf Horn on Konstanz in 1633. For his brother Ludwig (born 1614), who died of his injuries at the age of 19 on 6 October 1633 shortly after the last attack by the Swedes, Franz von Mercy had an artistic bronze epitaph made in the Konstanz Minster, which is still preserved today. On 2 March 1634, Mercy was taken prisoner in a battle near Thann against the Rhine Count Otto Louis of Salm-Kyrburg-Mörchingen. He was exchanged and from April onward he defended Rheinfelden against a Swedish siege, surrendering on 29 August after running out of food.

He became a general with the rank of General-Feldwachtmeister, and in 1635, 1636 and 1637 took part in further campaigns under command of Duke Charles IV of Lorraine on the Rhine and Doubs. In 1636 the Imperial army stationed in Lorraine and Burgundy under Matthias Gallas planned an attack on Paris from the south, but was stopped by French troops under Bernard of Saxe-Weimar. In the course of these campaigns Mercy took part in the siege of Colmar and in the successful relief of the French-besieged Dole in 1636. He besieged Héricourt unsuccessfully from 2 to 26 January 1637 and in June 1637 was defeated by Bernard at Gray with the loss of 1,000 men.

=== Bavarian general ===
In September 1638, the elector of Bavaria made him Generalfeldzeugmeister in the army of Bavaria, then the second largest army in Germany. During 1639, he screened the Imperial siege of Hohentwiel Castle under field marshal Geleen against attacks from the Breisgau. Confronted with a French-Weimarian incursion of the Lower Palatinate under the Duke of Longueville, Mercy and Geleen turned north, crossed the Rhine at Speyer and entrenched themselves in front of Longueville's army. In November, Longueville entered the Rheingau but was soon pushed back by Mercy and Geleen who ended their campaign with regaining Alzey and Bacharach. The following year, Mercy took part at the campaign of the main Imperial army under Archduke Leopold Wilhelm and Ottavio Piccolomini against the Swedes under Johan Banér. Mercy helped prevent the Swedes from invading Franconia. Repelling the Swedes and their allies to Hesse-Kassel, the Imperials and Bavarians laid in camp near Fritzlar for weeks in the immediate vicinity of their opponents. As both sides avoided a major battle, the Archduke concluded his campaign with capturing Höxter at the Weser river in October. Mercy himself returned to south-west Germany in late autumn.

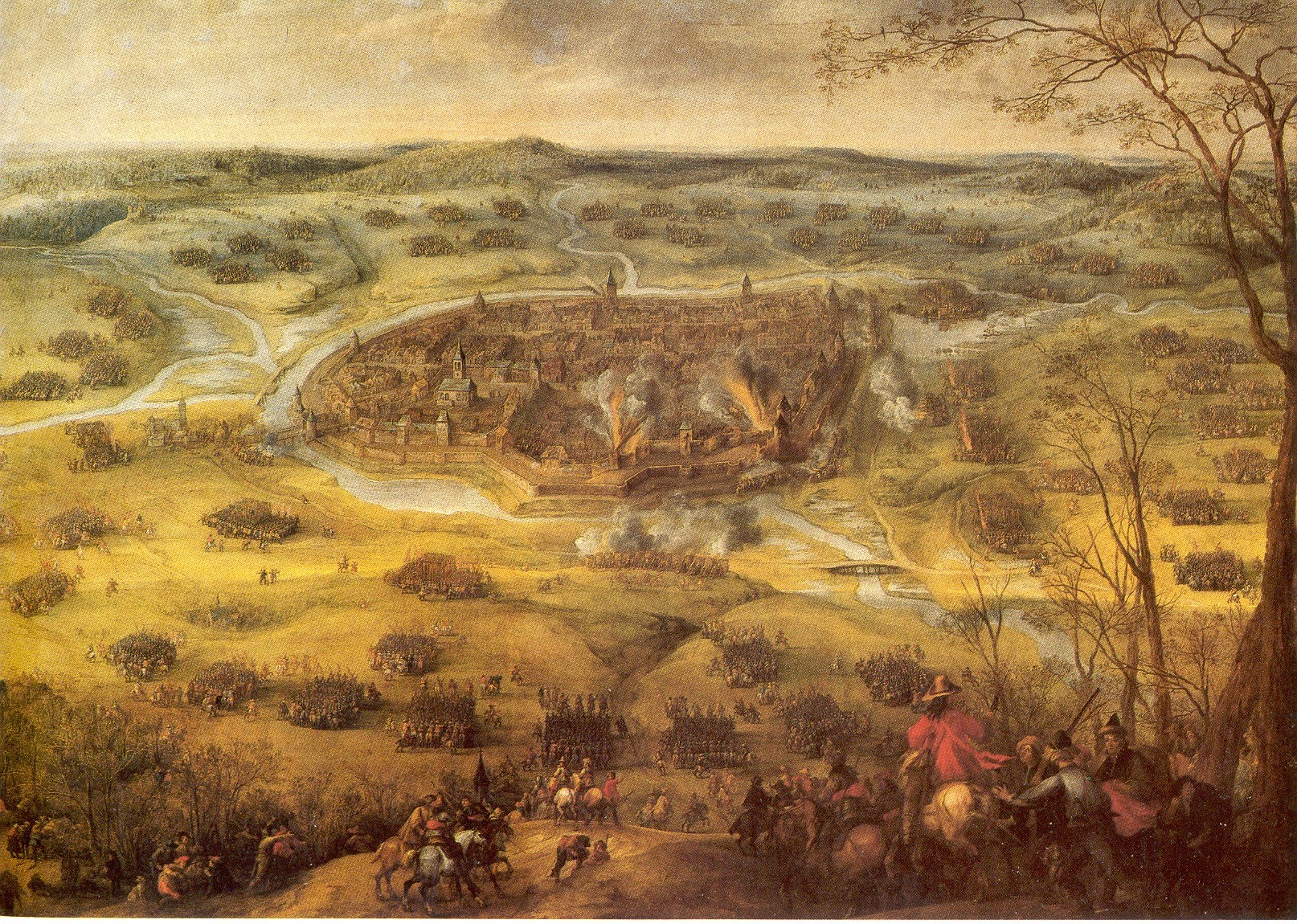
Painting of the siege of Neunburg in 1641 by Pieter Snayers

Mercy protected the Imperial Diet in Regensburg with his troops from a Swedish attack by Banér in January 1641. When the thawing of the icy Danube stopped the Swedish advance, Imperial and Bavarian troops rallied and forced the Swedes to retreat in flight. In pursuit of the Swedes into Bohemia, the vanguard under Mercy's brother Kaspar repulsed the Swedish rearguard under Erik Slang into Neunburg vorm Wald, where they capitulated to the Imperial-Bavarian army under Piccolomini and Franz von Mercy after several days resistance. Banér escaped just ahead of Mercy and Piccolomini over the Preßnitz Pass into Saxony. Continuing on the heels of the Swedes, Mercy had to hand over command to his superior Joachim Christian von Wahl at Zeitz on 1 May. Without Banér, who died en route, the Swedes joined the Lüneburg army sieging Wolfenbüttel. In an attempt to relieve the fortress, Mercy ambushed and captured 500 besiegers on 28 June. The next day, he commanded the left wing in battle against the siege army, who could not driven from their positions. Only after Imperial and Bavarian forces had captured numerous towns in the surrounding countryside, their opponents abandoned the siege of Wolfenbüttel in September. Until winter, Mercy took part in the capture of Einbeck and a futile siege of Göttingen in November.

In 1642 he received the command of the Bavarian troops in Swabia. In the course of the year he drove the opposing troops from Swabia and parts of the Breisgau. He was appointed a member of the Fruitbearing Society by Louis I, Prince of Anhalt-Köthen. Mercy was now considered one of the foremost soldiers in Europe, and was made Generalfeldmarschall on 31 May 1643. In 1643 he prevented the Weimarian army under the French Marshal Guébriant from invading Bavaria. As the successor to Wahl, who was in poor health, he also assumed command of the entire Bavarian army. He destroyed the French Marshal Rantzau's Weimarian army at the Battle of Tuttlingen (24–25 November), capturing the marshal and 7,000 men.

In 1644, Mercy opposed the French armies, now under the Great Condé and the Vicomte de Turenne. He captured Freiburg and subsequently held it in an inconclusive but bloody battle in August. On 2 May 1645, he defeated Turenne at Mergentheim. Later in 1645, fighting once more against Condé and Turenne, Mercy was killed by a musket ball at the Battle of Nördlingen (or Allerheim) on 3 August while leading reinforcements to the focus of the action. On the spot where he fell, a memorial stone with the inscription Sta, viator, heroem calcas! (Latin: "Halt, traveler; you tread upon a hero!") was set up, allegedly at Condé's instruction. His body was first brought to Donauwörth on an artillery wagon and then to Ingolstadt the next day, where he was buried in the Church of Saint Maurice. The French Marshal Gramont, who had been captured at the battle, reports of the exuberant reception that Mercy received from the people of the city who had hurried to the gates. He was very popular and highly regarded in Ingolstadt, where he had been the fortress commander and governor.

== Marriages and issue ==
Mercy was married three times. His first wife was Anna Margareta Bonn von Wachenheim who died around 1628 and made Mercy her sole heir. In 1630, Mercy married Anna Margareta von Schauenburg († 1636), a daughter of Johann Rainer von Schauenburg, the Landvogt of Ortenau. They had at least one daughter, Claudia (1631 – 1708) who later married Graf Bonaventura von Fugger (1619 – 1693), the first son of Otto Heinrich Fugger. The last wife of Franz von Mercy was Maria Magdalena von Flachsland who gave birth to most of his children, including three sons and one daughter who survived their childhood. All sons joined either the Austrian or the Bavarian military. The first son Max Leopold inherited Mercy's own Bavarian Regiment and later became imperial Generalfeldwachtmeister. The second son Peter Ernst von Mercy died in Austrian service deadly wounded in the Siege of Buda 1686, his son was Count Claude Florimond de Mercy, generally recognized as the last male descendant of Franz von Mercy. The third son Ferdinand Franz died in 1683 as commander of the Bavarian fortress of Ingolstadt.
