= Johann von Werth =

German cavalry general (1591–1652)

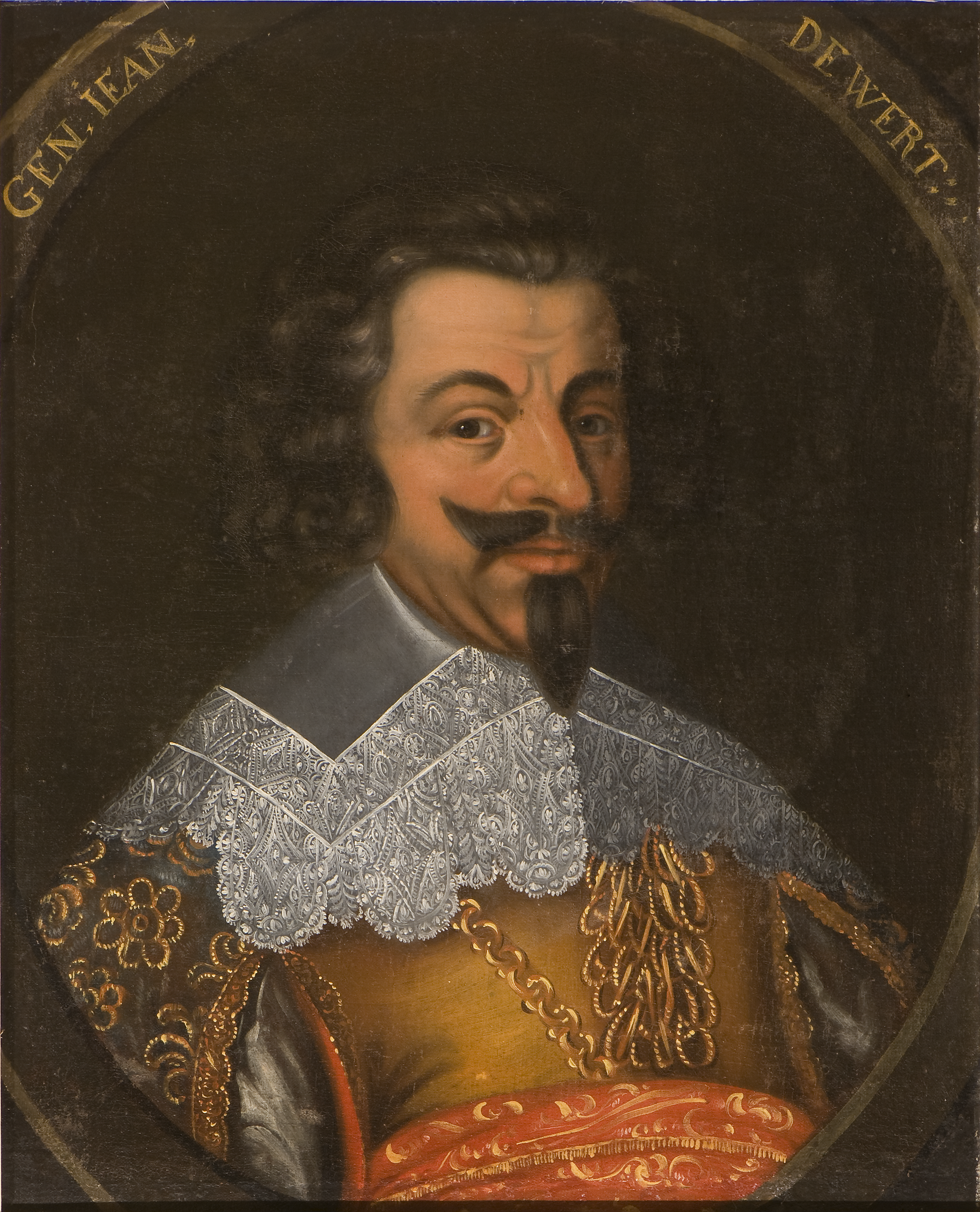
- Johann von Werth, imperial general of cavalry
- Born: 1591; Büttgen, Duchy of Jülich
- Died: 12 September 1652 (aged 60–61); Benátky nad Jizerou, Kingdom of Bohemia
- Military career
- Allegiance: Spain; Holy Roman Empire; Bavaria
- Service years: 1610–1648
- Rank: General of cavalry
- Units: Cuirassier
- Conflicts: Thirty Years' War: Battle of White Mountain (1620); Siege of Jülich (1621–1622); Battle of Fleurus (1622); Battle of Nördlingen (1634); Battle of Tuttlingen (1643); Battle of Freiburg (1644); Battle of Herbsthausen (1645); Battle of Nördlingen (1645); Siege of Weißenburg in Bayern (1647); Siege of Eger (1647); Battle of Triebl (1647); Battle of Dachau (1648)

Johann von Werth (1591 – 16 January 1652), also Jan von Werth or in French Jean de Werth, was a German general of cavalry in the Thirty Years' War.

== Biography ==
Werth was born in 1591 most likely at Büttgen in the Duchy of Jülich as the eldest son of the farmer Johann von Wierdt († 1606) and Elisabeth Streithoven. He had seven brothers and sisters. His exact birthplace is not sure, other candidates are Puffendorf (today part of Baesweiler) and Linnich. In the past, historians also argued for Weert in Limburg because they confused him with Jan van der Croon, another imperial general with similar vita.

Around 1610, he left home to become a soldier of fortune in the Walloon cavalry under Ambrogio Spinola in the Spanish Netherlands. Most likely, he fought in the War of the Jülich Succession and served afterwards in the garrison of Lingen. The outbreak of the Thirty Years' War saw him moving to Bohemia in support of Holy Roman Emperor Ferdinand II. In the spanish regiment Marradas, he fought at White Mountain in 1620. In 1622, at the taking of Jülich, he won promotion to the rank of lieutenant. He also participated at the battle of Fleurus in 1622 but his military actions over the next eight years are not known. In this time, he married the Dutch woman Gertrud van Gent, mother of his eldest children Lambertine Irmgard and Johann Anton.

He served as an Oberstwachtmeister in a cavalry regiment in the Bavarian army in 1630. He obtained the command of a regiment, both titular and effective, in 1632, and in 1633 and 1634 laid the foundations of his reputation as a swift and fearsome leader of cavalry forays. His achievements were even more conspicuous in the great pitched Battle of Nördlingen (1634), after which the emperor made him a Freiherr of the Empire, and the elector of Bavaria gave him the rank of Lieutenant field marshal. About this time, he armed his regiment with the musket in addition to the sword.

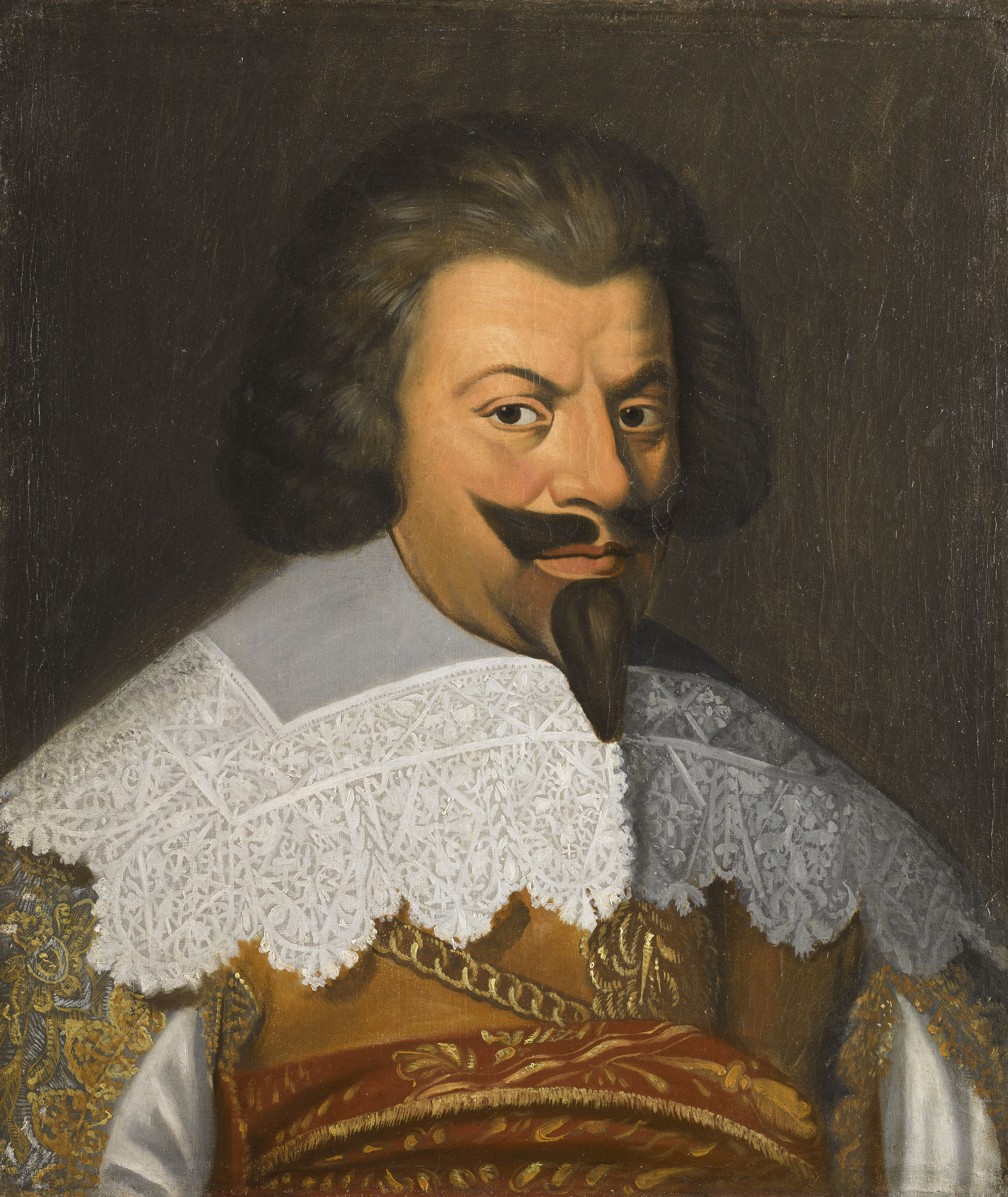
Johann von Werth as burgrave (governor) of Odenkirchen, oil on canvas

In 1635 and 1636 Werth's forays extended into Lorraine and Luxembourg, after which he projected an expedition into the heart of France. Starting in July 1636, from the country of the lower Meuse, he raided far and wide, and even urged his commander-in-chief, Cardinal-Infante Ferdinand of Austria, to "plant the Double Eagle on the Louvre". Though this was not attempted. Werth's horsemen appeared at Saint-Denis before a French army of fifty thousand men at Compiègne forced the invaders to retreat. The memory of this raid lasted long, and the name of "Jean de Wert" figures in folk-songs and serves as a bogey to quieten unruly children.

In 1637 Jean de Wert married Maria Isabella von Spaur in St. Verena, Straßberg.

In 1637 Werth was once more in the Rhine valley, destroying convoys, relieving besieged towns and surprising the enemy's camps. In February 1638 he defeated the Weimar troops in an engagement at Rheinfelden, but shortly afterwards was made prisoner by Bernhard of Saxe-Weimar. His hopes of being exchanged for the Swedish field marshal Gustaf Horn were dashed when Bernhard had to deliver up his captive to the French. Jean de Wert was brought to Paris, amidst great rejoicings from the country people. He was lionized by the society of the capital, visited in prison by high ladies. So light was his captivity that he said that nothing bound him but his word of honour. His eventual release was delayed until March 1642 because the Imperial government feared to see Horn at the head of the Swedish army and would not allow an exchange.

When at last Werth reappeared in the field it was as general of cavalry in the Imperial and Bavarian and Cologne services. His first campaign against the French marshal Guebriant was uneventful, but his second (1643) in which Baron Franz von Mercy was his commander-in-chief, was the Battle of Tuttlingen in which Werth was instrumental in a surprise victory. In 1644 he was in the lower Rhine country, but he returned to Mercy's headquarters in time to fight in the Battle of Freiburg. In the following year he played a decisive role in the Second Battle of Nördlingen. Mercy was killed in this action, and Werth temporarily commanded the defeated arm until succeeded by Field-marshal Geleen. Werth was disappointed, but remained thoroughly loyal to his soldierly code of honour, and found an outlet for his anger in renewed military activity.

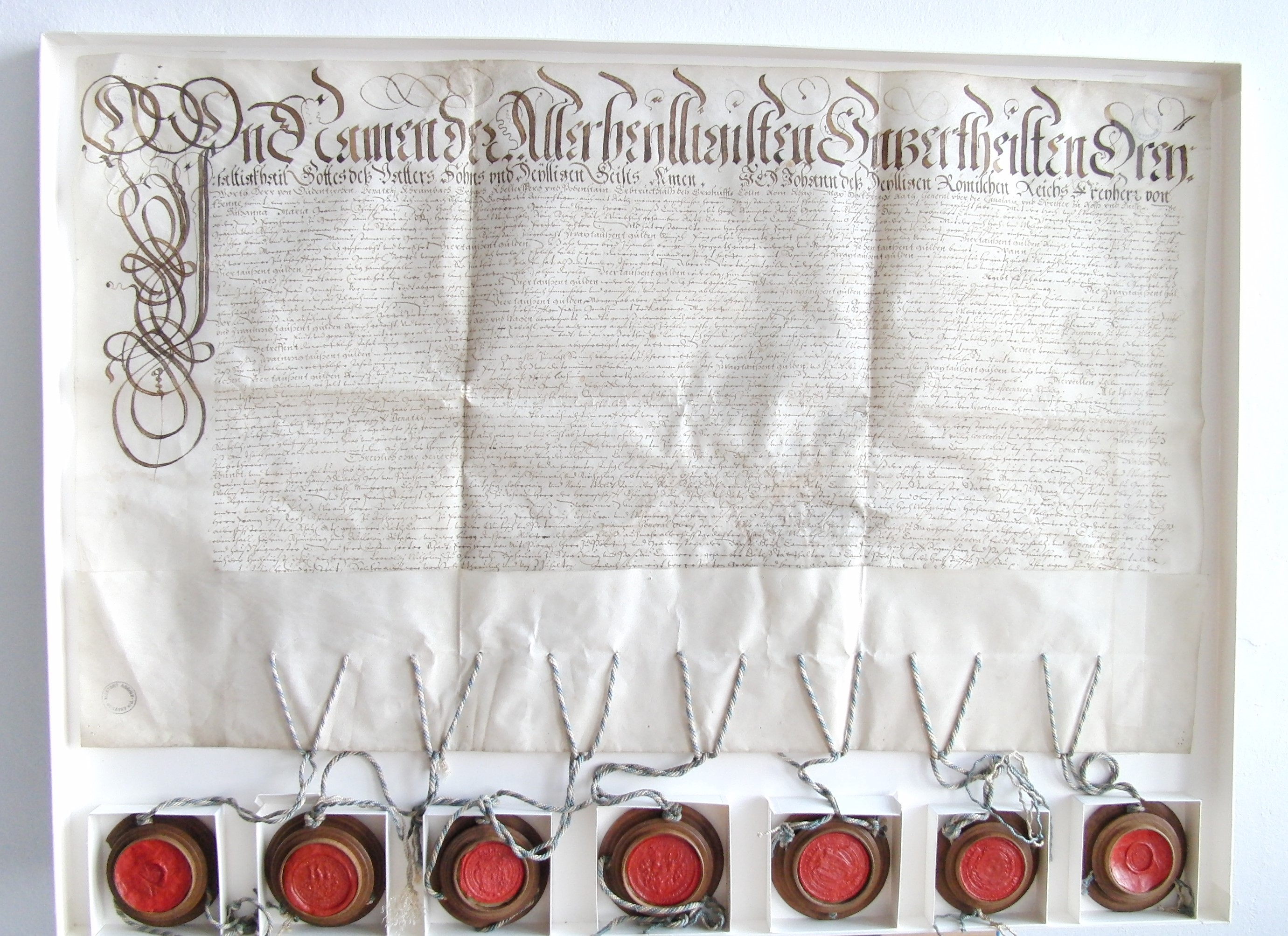
Wedding contract of Johann von Werth 1648 (SOkA Mladá Boleslav)

In 1647 differences arose between the Elector and the Emperor as to the allegiance due from the Bavarian troops, in which, after long hesitation, Werth, fearing that the cause of the Empire and of the Catholic religion would be ruined if the Elector resumed control of the troops, attempted to take his men over the Austrian border. But they refused to follow and, escaping with great difficulty from the Elector's vengeance, Werth found a refuge in Austria. The Emperor was grateful for his conduct in this affair, ordered the Elector to rescind his ban. The last campaign of the war (1648) was uneventful, and shortly after its close he retired to live on the estates which he had bought in the course of his career. And it was at one of these, Benatek 40 kilometres (25 mi) NE of Prague in Bohemia, a gift from the emperor, that he died on 16 of January 1652. He was buried in the church of Nativity of the Virgin Mary in Benátky.

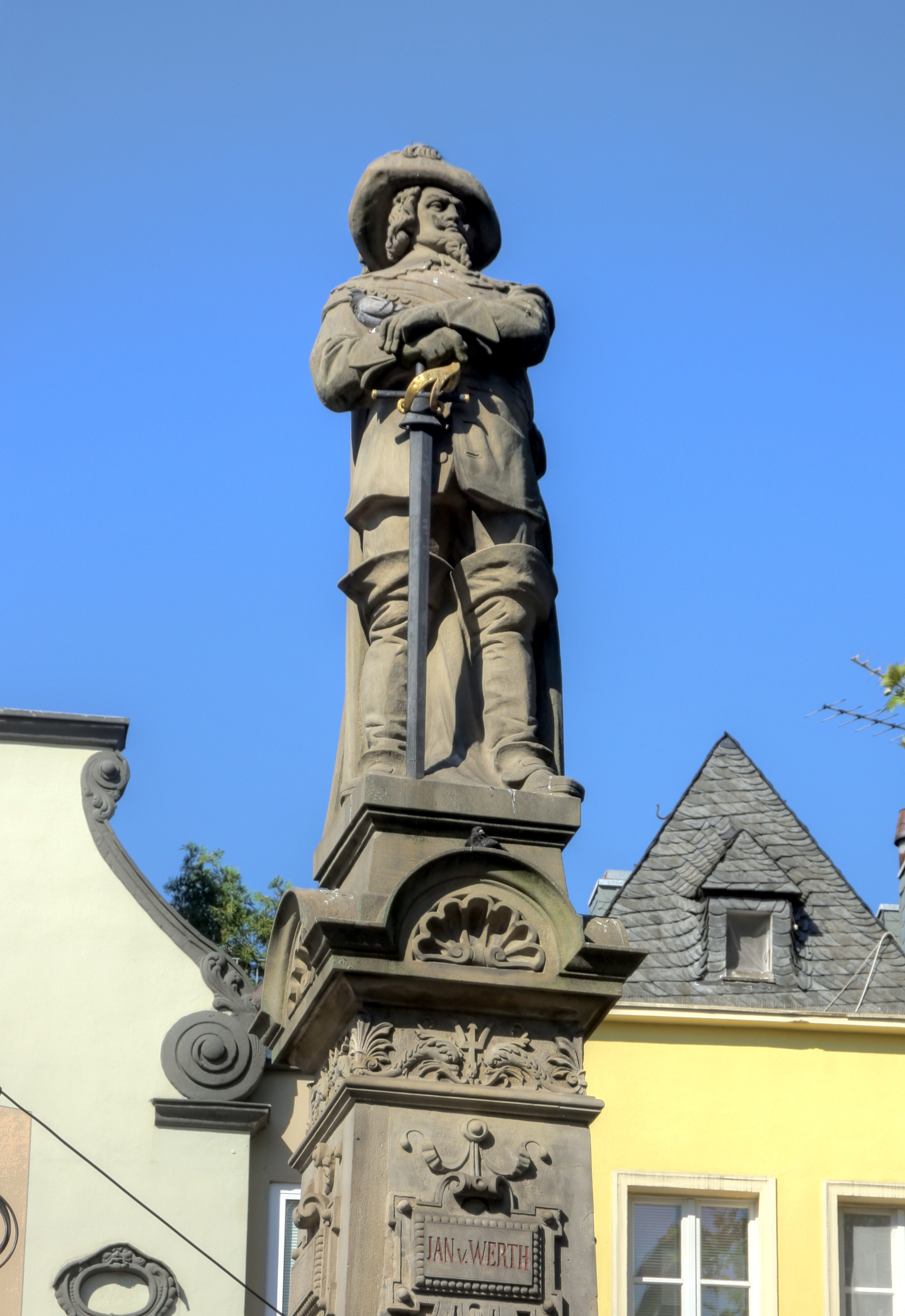
Johann von Werth memorial in Cologne; by Wilhelm Albermann

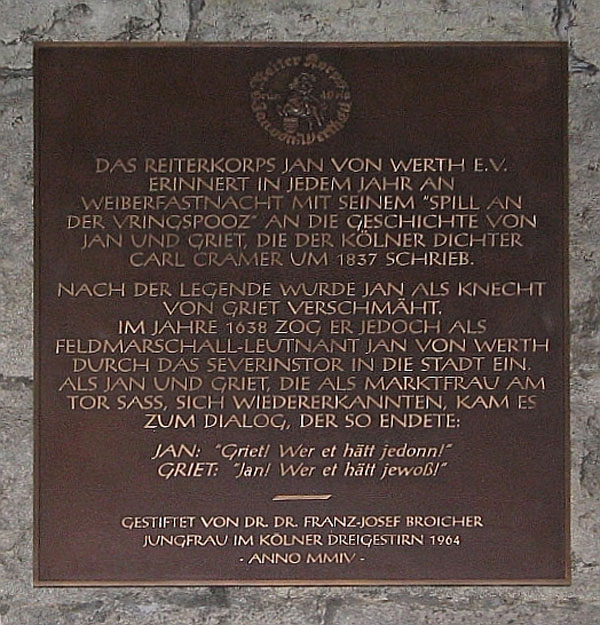
The Legend of Jan and Jriet at the St. Severinus City Gate of Cologne

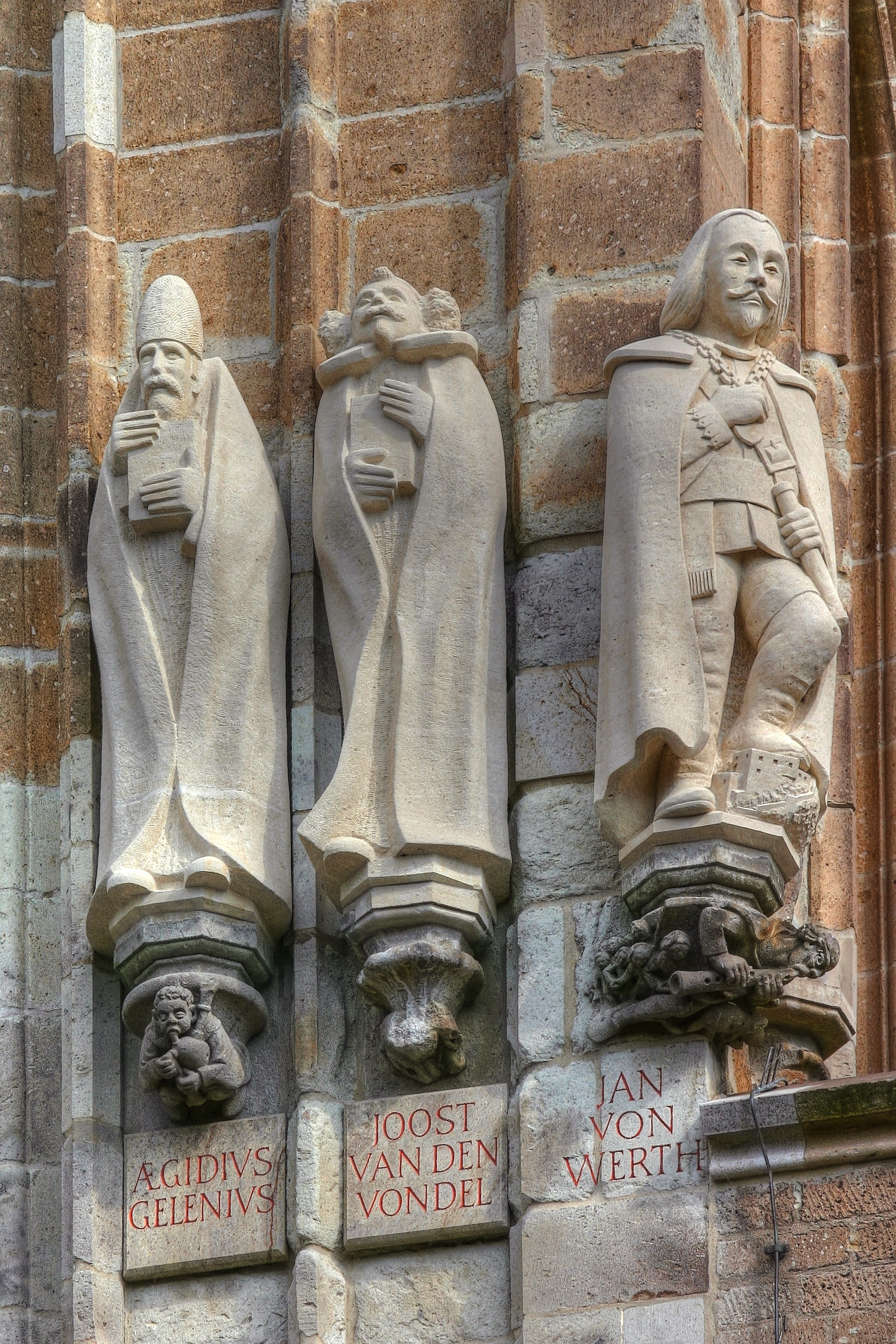
Johann von Werth (right) among the statues of the (currently) 125 most important people from 64 BC to 1985 AD at Cologne City Hall

== Legend of Jan and Griet ==
Johann von Werth's life became a popular legend in the Rhineland and Cologne that is frequently reenacted at Karneval time:

A poor peasant, Jan, fell in love with Griet but she wanted a wealthier partner and declined his offer of marriage. Devastated by her rejection he came upon an army recruiter and signed up to go to war. Through hard work and good fortune he rose to become a general, celebrating several victories. After taking the fort at Hermannstein he was leading his triumphant troops into Cologne through St. Severin's Gate, when he saw his former love Griet selling fruit at a market. Griet was filled with regret at turning down such a successful person and exclaimed "Jan, who would have thought it?" to which he replied "Griet, who would have had done it!" and turns away.

The story has several variants. It has inspired many songs including one in 2001 by the rock band BAP. Jan von Werth's name has been used for centuries to name military and recreational organisations, particularly groups of mounted marksmen at Schützenfests and Karneval.

== Sources ==
Attribution:

- Lahrkamp, Helmut (1962). Jan von Werth. Sein Leben nach archivalischen Quellenzeugnissen. Cologne: Verlag der Löwe.
- Poten, Bernhard von (1897). "Werth, Johann von" . Allgemeine Deutsche Biographie (in German). Vol. 42. Leipzig: Duncker & Humblot. pp. 103–111.
- "Johann Graf von Werth". Reiterkorps „Jan von Werth“.
