= Josias von Rantzau =

Danish military, marshal of France (1609–1650)

Josias Rantzau
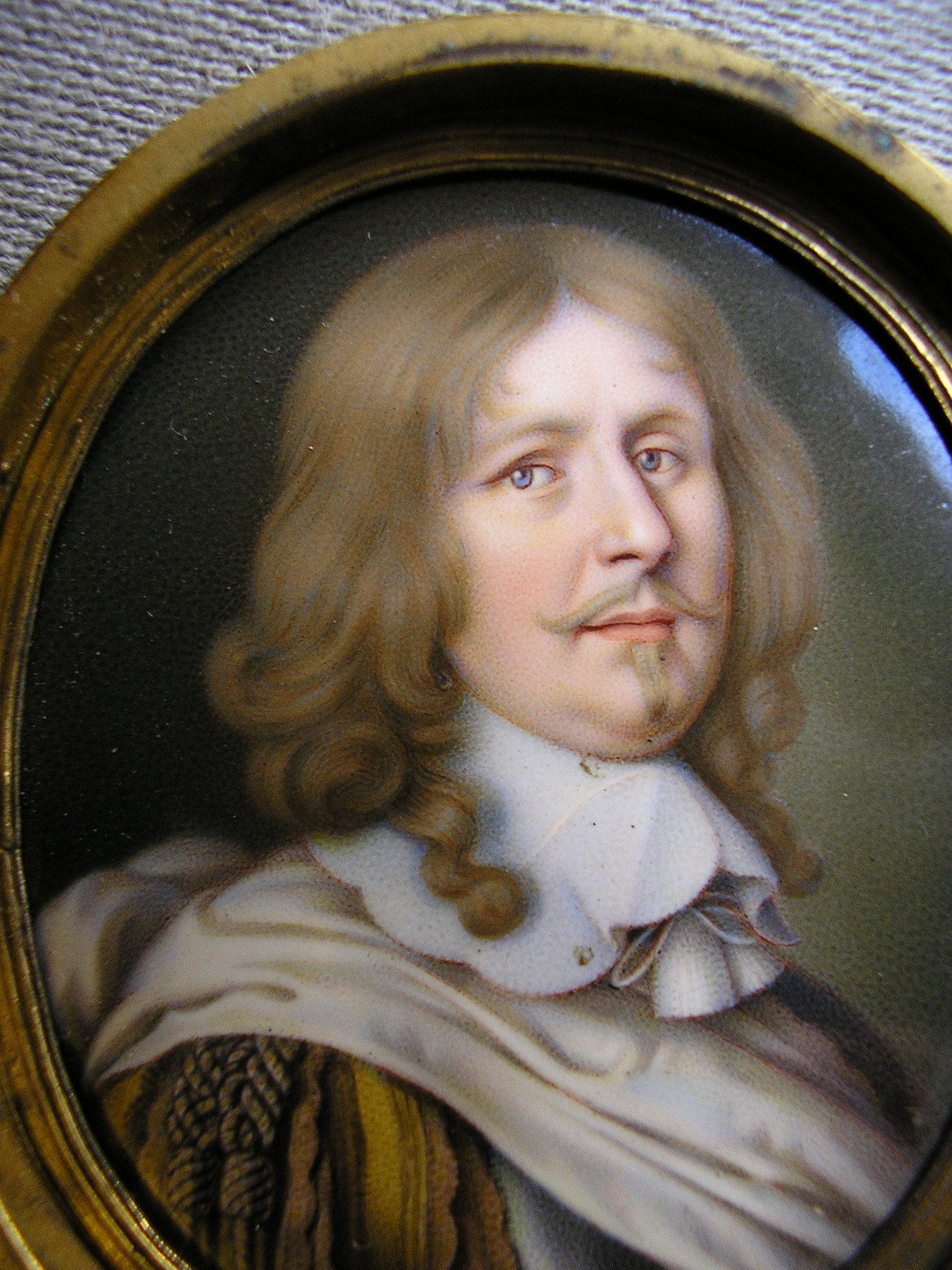
- Contemporary portrait
- Born: 18 October 1609; Bothkamp, Duchy of Holstein, Holy Roman Empire
- Died: 14 September 1650 (aged 40) Paris, Kingdom of France
- Rank: Marshal of France
- Conflicts: Battle of Honnecourt; Battle of Tuttlingen
- Other work: Governor of Dunkirk

Josias Rantzau (18 October 1609 – 14 September 1650) was a Danish military leader and Marshal of France.

Josias was the grandson of Paul, the youngest son of Johann Rantzau. He married his Cousin Hedwig Margarethe Elisabeth vor Rantzau, but had no children.

As a young man, he served Prince Maurice of Orange and King Christian IV of Denmark. Later he fought for Sweden, then the Holy Roman Empire, again for Sweden and finally since 1635 for France, where he was noticed at Court for his blond beauty.

He commanded troops in the Franche-Comté, on the Rhine, and in Flanders. In 1633, he successfully defended Andernach against the Spanish, but is in general better remembered for his bravery than for his military skills.

He was taken prisoner by the Spanish in 1642 at the Battle of Honnecourt, and again in 1643 by Imperial troops at the Battle of Tuttlingen. On 30 June 1645, he became Marshal of France and in 1646 Governor of the newly conquered Dunkirk Fortress.

During the Fronde, he was arrested by Mazarin and locked up in the Bastille. He was acquitted, but died shortly after being released.
