= Jean-Baptiste Budes, Comte de Guébriant =

French soldier (1602–1643)

Jean-Baptiste Budes, comte de Guébriant (1602 – 17 November 1643) was marshal of France.

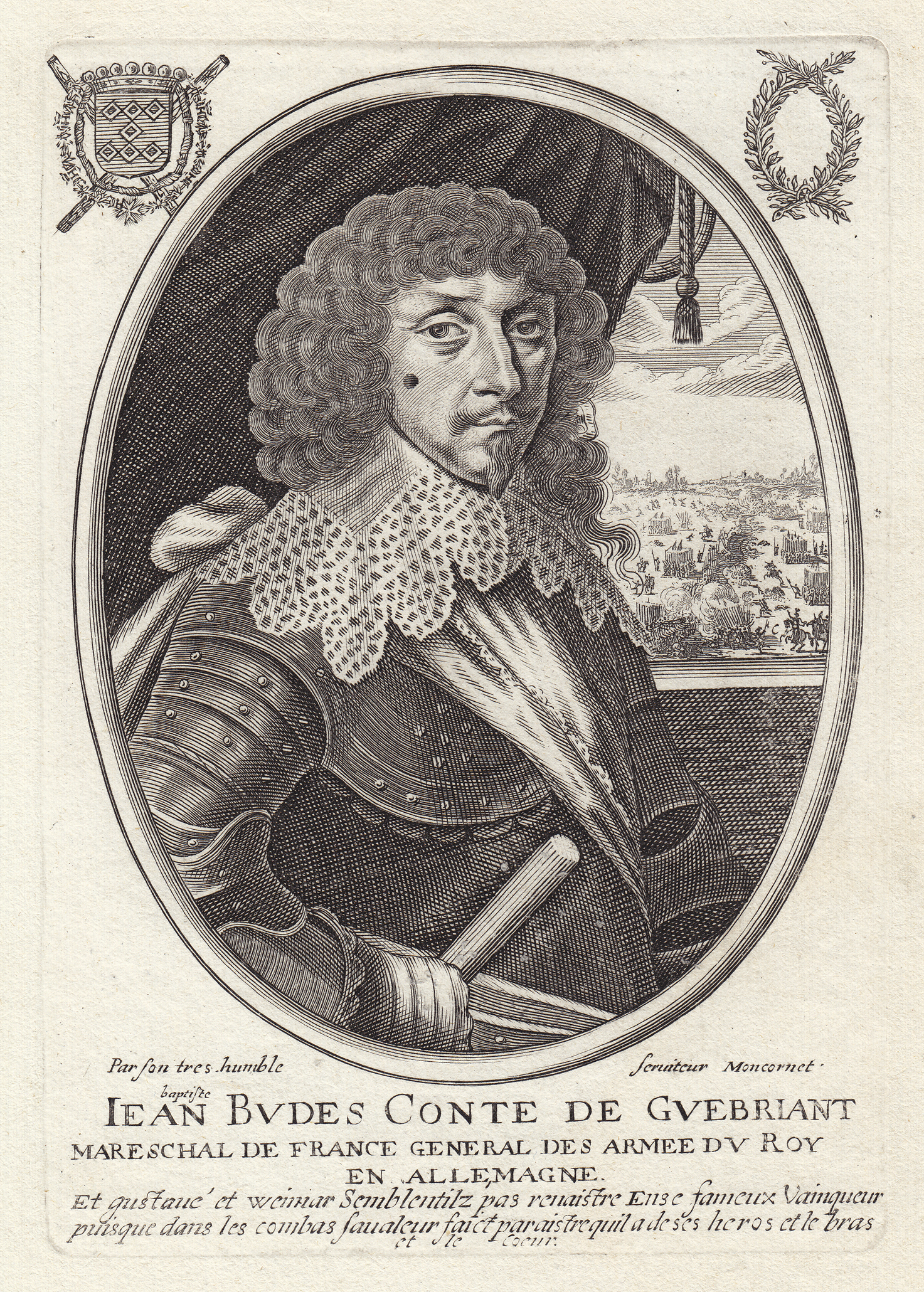
Jean-Baptiste Budes, comte de Guébriant.

== Life ==
He was born at the Chateau de Plessix-Budes in a Breton family. He served as a soldier first in the Netherlands, and was seriously injured in the Siege of Vigone (Piedmont) in 1630. In the Thirty Years' War he commanded from 1638 to 1639 the French contingent in the army of his friend Bernhard of Saxe-Weimar, distinguishing himself particularly at the siege of Breisach in 1638. On the death of Bernard he received the command of his army, and tried, in conjunction with Johan Banér (1596-1641), the Swedish general, a bold attack upon Regensburg (1640).

His victories at Wolfenbüttel on 29 June 1641 and at Kempen in 1642 won for him the marshal's baton. Having failed in an attempt to invade Bavaria with Torstensson, he seized Rottweil but was mortally wounded there on 17 November 1643, dying five or six days later.

=== Marriage ===
He married Renée Crespin du Bec (1614-1659), "La maréchale de Guébriant", who was the first female ambassador in the history of France. She was appointed "Extraordinary ambassador" to accompany Marie Louise Gonzaga to Poland in 1645 to be married to King Wladyslaw IV. They had no children.

== Sources ==
- Le Laboreur (1656), Histoire du maréchal de Guébriant
- A. Brinzinger in Württembergische Vierteljahrschrift für Landesgeschichte (1902).

Attribution:
