= Scotland and the Thirty Years' War =

Scottish participation in the Thirty Years' War

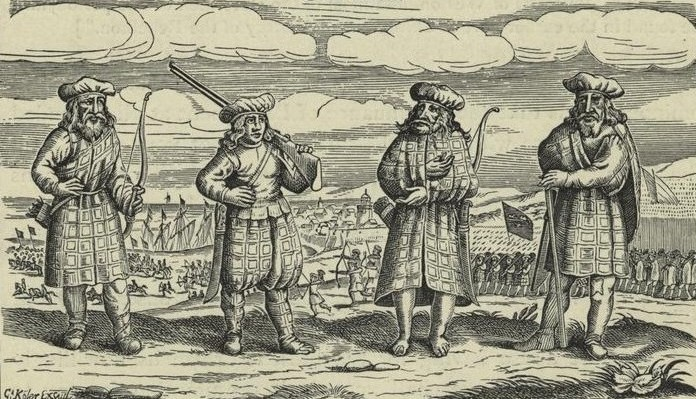
Scottish soldiers in the service of Gustavus Adolphus of Sweden; 1631 German engraving

There was a complicated involvement between Scotland and the Thirty Years' War of 1618–1648. Scotland and the Scots were heavily entangled in both the diplomatic and military events which centred on the Holy Roman Empire. There were a number of reasons for this participation.

Among these, the fate of the Scottish princess Elizabeth of Bohemia (daughter of King James VI & I) proved to be a key concern. Up to 50,000 Scottish troops arrived on the continent having been levied on warrants issued by the Privy Council and countersigned by their king, usually at periods corresponding to the participation of a particular ally in a campaign against the Habsburgs. They mostly served initially in established Scottish brigades in the Dutch Republic and Sweden which had existed before 1618. Later, specially commissioned army groups were also created in Denmark-Norway and France to facilitate further Scottish participation. Some fought for better prospects, some for kin loyalty, others for dynastic and confessional considerations. A few, the minority, were plain mercenaries. Although Scots participated from the start of the war until the end, formal participation by the nation was limited. Scotland formally declared war on Spain (1625–1630) and France (1627–1629), but for the most part, Scots engaged in foreign service with consent from their monarch and under warrants issued by the Privy Council but in armies commanded by their European allies.

Through such service ambitious individual Scots in different European courts had a profound influence on the course of the war both conducting diplomacy and commanding entire army groups in the campaign. These included General Sir James Spens of Wormiston, Lieutenant General Patrick Ruthven, Lieutenant General James King and Field Marshal Alexander Leslie who all served in Sweden. These men were joined in Germany by an auxiliary army with Scots and English under notional Swedish command and led by James, 3rd Marquis Hamilton (1631–1632).

In France the main officers were Marechal de France John Hepburn (1634–1636), a former colonel in Swedish service, and Sir Robert Moray (1640s). In Denmark Robert Maxwell Earl of Nithsdale led a contingent including Donald Mackay Lord Reay and Colonel Robert Monro and Alexander Lindsay, 2nd Lord Spynie among others (1627–1629).

The Scots Brigade, which had existed since 1572, was another outlet for Scottish soldiers looking for service in Continental armies. Although in the service and under the payroll of the States-General of the Dutch Republic, these troops were, first and foremost, loyal to the House of Stuart. Nonetheless, Scottish soldiers may have chosen to serve in the Republic due to their religious beliefs, perhaps as part of movement of "Calvinist Internationalism." Notable officers include Colonel William Brog, William Balfour, James Livingston, 1st Earl of Callendar, and several generations of the Lords and Earls of Buccleuch. Notable engagements during their service in the Eighty Years' War include the Battle of Nieuwpoort (1600), the Siege of Ostend (1601-1604), the War of the Jülich Succession (1609-1610), the Siege of Bergen-op-Zoom (1622), the Siege of 's-Hertogenbosch (1629), and the Siege of Breda (1637), among countless others.

Not all Scots fought for or believed in the cause of either Elizabeth of Bohemia or the Protestant northern alliances. A number fought for the Habsburgs (Austrian and Spanish) for the same complex reasons as their countrymen; there were some committed to the counter-reformation, some compelled by circumstance and some opportunists such as Albrecht von Wallenstein's assassin, Count Walter Leslie.

== Scottish people of the Thirty Years' War ==
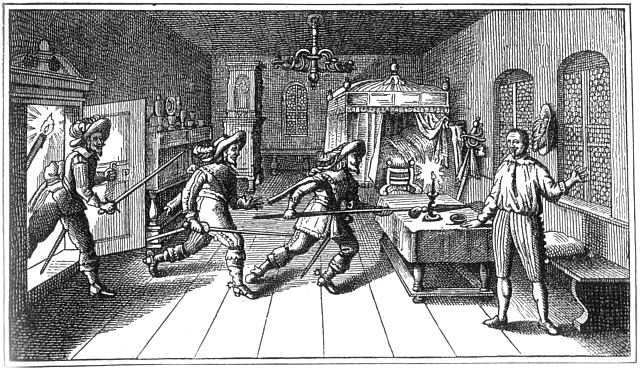
The assassination of Albrecht von Wallenstein by the Scottish and Irish officers led by Colonel Walter Leslie

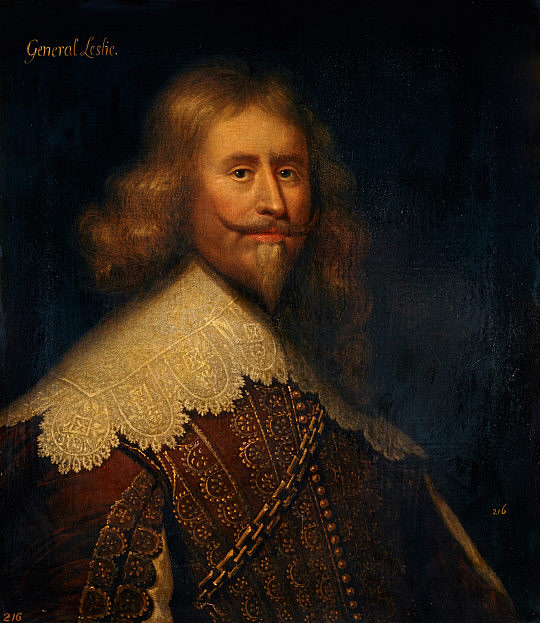
General Leslie

Noted Scots that participated in the Thirty Years' War or had strong interests in it, include:

Scottish monarchs and royalty

- James VI & I – King of Scotland (1567–1625) & England and Ireland (1603–1625)
- Elizabeth of Bohemia – Daughter of James VI. The Scottish-born princess became Queen of Bohemia after her husband Frederick V of the Palatinate accepted the Bohemian Crown.
- Charles I – Son of James VI. The Scottish-born prince ruled as King of Scotland, England and Ireland, 1625–1649.

Field marshals and generals

- Archibald Douglas, lieutenant general of artillery in the Hamilton Army in Germany
- Robert Douglas, Count of Skenninge, eventually elevated to field marshal in the Swedish army (1655), Douglas reached the rank of lieutenant general by the end of the war in 1648. He commanded the left wing of Torstensson's army at Jankowitz
- David Drummond, colonel of Kalmar Regiment, major general in the Swedish army
- Alexander 'Arvid' Forbes, also known as Finn Forbes, an ethnic Scot and major general in the Swedish army.
- Alexander Hamilton, also known as 'Dear Sandy', General of Artillery in the Swedish army, later General of Artillery in the Army of the Covenant.
- James Hamilton, Marquis of Hamilton (later Duke of Hamilton), "General of British" in the Swedish army in Germany
- John Hepburn, Maréchal de France and field marshal in the French army
- Thomas Kerr, major general in the Swedish army
- James King, Lord Eythin, lieutenant-general in the Swedish army in Germany, Governor of Vlotho
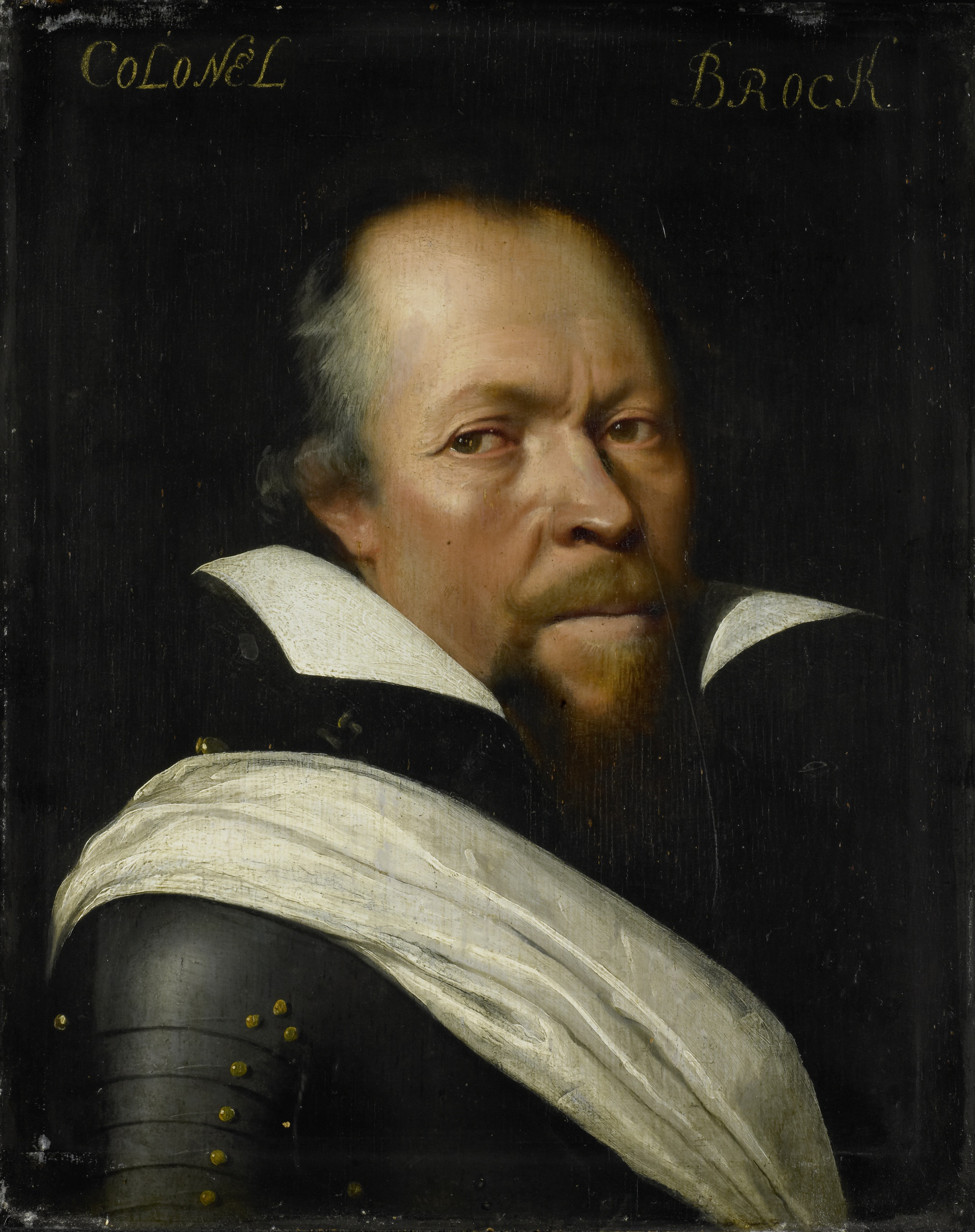
- Colonel Brog
  Alexander Leslie, Earl of Leven, field marshal in the Swedish army in Germany, Governor of the Baltic Provinces and victor of Wittstock in 1636.
- Robert Maxwell, Earl of Nithsdale, titular 'General of Scots' in the Danish army.
- James MacDouglall, a.k.a. Jacob Duwall, an ethnic Scot and major general in the Swedish army
- James Ramsay 'the Black', major general in the Swedish army.
- John Ruthven, major general in the Swedish army
- Patrick Ruthven, Earl of Forth, field marshal in the Swedish army in Germany, Governor of Ulm
- Robert Scott, General of Artillery in the Danish army.
- James Spens, "General of British", and "General of Scots" in the Swedish army.
- Frances de Traytorrens, general of fortifications in the Swedish army

Some of the more notable Colonels

- William Baillie, later major general in Scotland
- William Balfour, colonel in the Scots-Dutch brigade, later a general in England
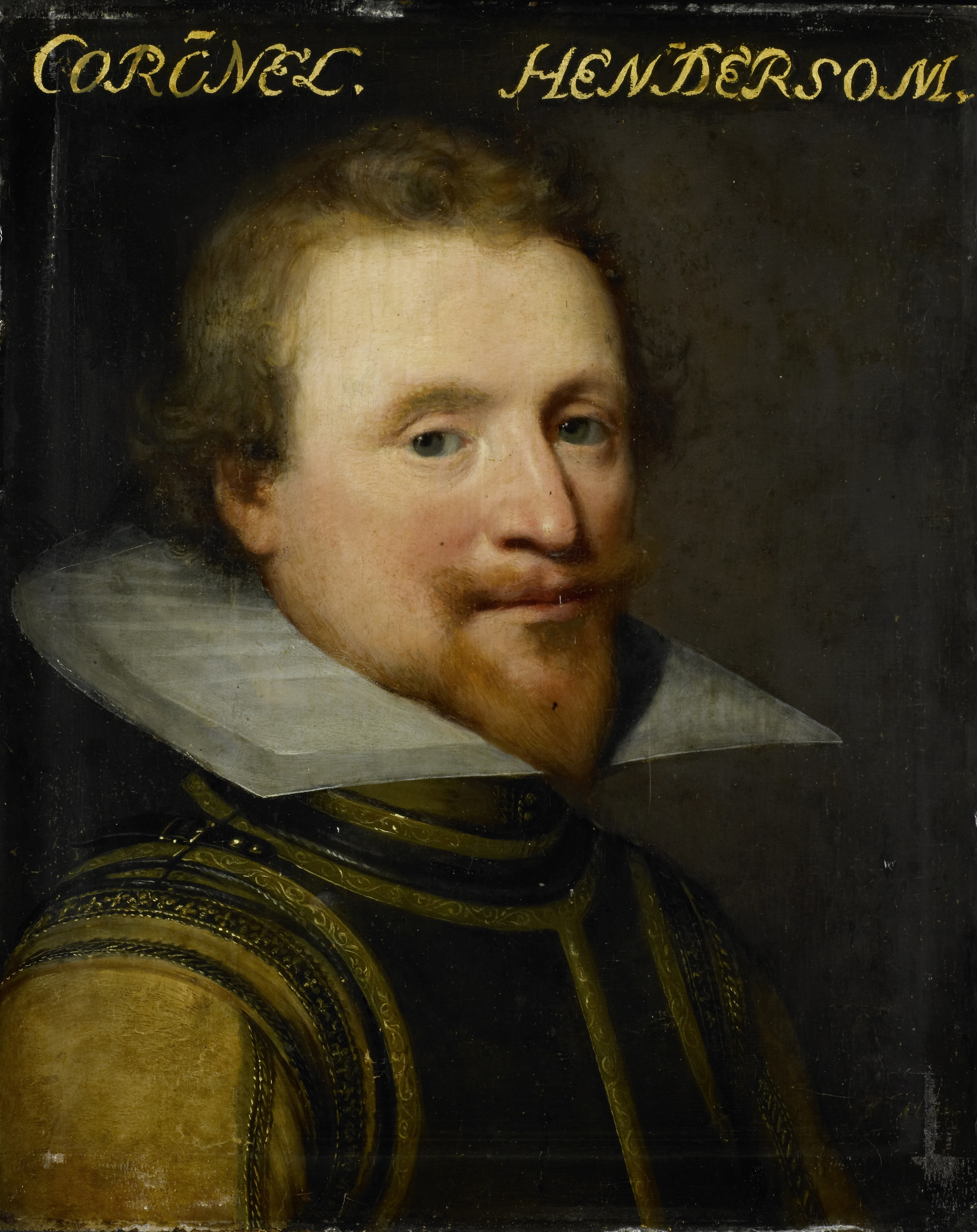
- Colonel Robert Henderson
  William Barclay, colonel in Swedish service, later major general in Sweden (1654)
- William Bonar, colonel and commandant (Glogau, Silesia) in Swedish service
- William Brog, colonel in the Scots-Dutch Brigade
- Henry (Harry) Bruce, captain in the Scots-Dutch Brigade, colonel and governor in Imperial service
- Colonel Robert Cunningham, colonel in Swedish service
- James Douglas colonel in the French army
- Alexander Forbes 'the Bald', colonel in the service of Hessen-Kassel
- William Forbes, colonel of Germans in Swedish service
- Andrew Gray, Catholic and colonel of a "Regiment of Brittanes" in Bohemia
- Herbert Gladstone, colonel in Swedish service
- Alexander Gordon, colonel in the Swedish service
- John Gordon, colonel in Swedish service
- John Gunn, colonel in Swedish service
- William Gunn, colonel in Swedish service, refused promotion higher due to his Catholicism, later a colonel in Imperial service.
- Hugo Hamilton, 1st Baron of Deserf colonel in the Swedish army
- Alexander Hay, colonel in Swedish service
- Robert Henderson, colonel in the Scots-Dutch Brigade
- Francis Henderson, colonel in the Scots-Dutch Brigade
- Alexander Irving, colonel in Swedish service
- Frances Johnstone, colonel in Swedish service
- Thomas Kinnemond, colonel in Swedish service
- Patrick Kinnemond, colonel in Swedish service
- Alexander Leslie, 2nd Lord Balgonie, colonel in Swedish service, later colonel in the British Civil Wars
- Alexander Leslie of Auchintoul, colonel in Swedish and Russian service, later first-ever general in Russia (1653)
- George Leslie, colonel in Swedish service
- David Leslie, Lord Newark, colonel in the Swedish army.
- Robert Leslie (brother of Lord Newark), colonel in Hessen-Kassel
- Walter Leslie, Count of the Holy Roman Empire
- Alexander Lindsay, 2nd Lord Spynie, colonel and governor in Danish service
- George Lindsay, Earl of Crawford, colonel in the Swedish army
- Harry Lindsay, colonel in Swedish service
- James Lumsden colonel in Swedish service, later lieutenant general in Scotland
- Donald Mackay, 1st Lord Reay, colonel in Danish and Swedish service
- Robert Monro, major in the Danish army, colonel in the Swedish army, later lieutenant general in Scotland and Ireland
- Robert Moray, colonel in French service and sometime quartermaster general of the Army of the Covenant
- Patrick More, colonel in the Swedish army during the war, later promoted to major general in Swedish service (March 1675) based in Buxtehude near Hamburg
- Robert Munro, Baron of Foulis, colonel in Swedish service
- John Nairn, colonel in Swedish service
- James Ramsay 'the Fair', colonel in Swedish service under Marquis Hamilton.
- William Phillip, colonel in Swedish service
- Andrew Rutherford, 1st Earl of Teviot, colonel in French service, promoted to lieutenant general in 1653
- Frances Ruthven, colonel in Swedish service
- Robert Sanderson, colonel in Swedish service
- Alexander Seaton, colonel in Danish service, later admiral of a fleet in Denmark during the Torstensson War
- Johan Skytte, ethnic Scot and colonel of a Scottish regiment in Sweden
- Robert Stewart, colonel in Swedish service

Important Scottish diplomats

- Sir Robert Anstruther, Stuart ambassador to Denmark (and Danish ambassador to Britain), Sweden, the Dutch Republic and the Holy Roman Empire
- William Douglas, Stuart ambassador to Poland-Lithuania and Elizabeth of Bohemia
- James Hay, 1st Earl of Carlisle. Stuart ambassador to France and Spain
- John Henderson, colonel in Swedish service, later Stuart Diplomat to Denmark-Norway and alleged Cromwellian agent.
- Walter Leslie, assassin, Imperial Count and diplomat for the House of Stuart and the Holy Roman Empire
- Hugh Mowatt, agent, spy and later accredited diplomat between Sweden and the Scottish and English parliaments
- Andrew Sinclair, Stuart ambassador to Denmark
- Sir James Spens, Stuart ambassador to Sweden (and Swedish ambassador to Britain), Denmark and the Dutch Republic

== Basis for the Covenanter armies ==
Thousands of Scots returned home from foreign service to join the Covenanters, including experienced leaders like Alexander Leslie and General of Artillery Alexander Hamilton. These veterans played an important role in training the Covenanter recruits. However, more senior officers including Lieutenant General Patrick Ruthven, Lieutenant General James King, Major General John Ruthven also returned to confront their former comrades. Both Covenanters and Royalists returned with cohorts of officers, and both introduced the 'Swedish Discipline' into their respective armies. When the wars spread to England, a situation arose in 1644 where the senior commander of the parliamentary allied army was Alexander Leslie, Earl of Leven while his opposition was led by Patrick Ruthven, now Earl of Forth and Lord General of the Royalist forces in England. Both men survived the war and died peacefully in their beds.

== Sources and fiction ==
Some notable Scottish contemporary published sources

- William Forbes, a diary edited by D. Pleiss, 'Das Kriegstagebuch des schwedischen Offiziers William Forbes: Von seiner Landung an der Unterelbe im Sommer 1634 bis zu seiner Rückkehr nach Stade im Winter 1649/50’, Stader Jahrbuch Neue Folge 85, (1995), pp. 135–53.
- Thomas Kellie, Pallas Armata or Military Instructions for the Learned, The First Part (Edinburgh, 1627).
- Andrew Melvill, edited and published by Torick Ameer-Ali as Memoirs of Sir Andrew Melvill (London, 1918). Only a small part on the Thirty Years' War.
- Robert Monro, His Expedition with a worthy Scots Regiment called Mac-Keyes (2 vols., London, 1637).

Contemporary poetry and fiction

- Arthur Johnston, a contemporary neo-Latinist poet, wrote poems about the Bohemian part of the conflict in W.D. Geddes (ed.) Musa Latina Aberdonensis vol. 1 (Aberdeen Spalding Club, 1892)
- Simplicius Simplicissimus (1668) by Hans Jakob Christoffel von Grimmelshausen, one of the most important German novels of the 17th century, is the comic fictional autobiography of a half-German, half-Scottish peasant turned mercenary who serves under various powers during the war, based on the author's first-hand experience. An opera adaptation by the same name was produced in the 1930s, written by Karl Amadeus Hartmann.

== Modern fiction ==
- Dallas, O., A Ragged Renown: A Romance of the Thirty Years’ War (1934)
- Dallas, O., The Daughter of the Scots’ Brigade (1938)
- Dickason, C., The King’s Daughter (2010)
- Henty, G.A., The Lion of the North: The adventures of a Scottish lad during the Thirty Years’ War (2 vol., 1997 reprint). Available under sub-title variants including a comic strip.
- Lorimer, J., The Green Brigade (1935)
- Friedrich Schiller's Wallenstein trilogy (1799) is a fictional account of the downfall of this general. Not Scottish as such, but contains fictionalised accounts of Wallenstein's assassins, including Count Walter Leslie.
- Scott, E., The Best Soldier: The Life of Sir John Hepburn, Marshal of France, Founder and First Colonel of the Royal Scots, 1628–1636 (Hawick, 2011)
- Stevenson, J., The Winter Queen (2003)
