= William Brog =

17th century Scottish colonel

Colonel, Sir William Brog
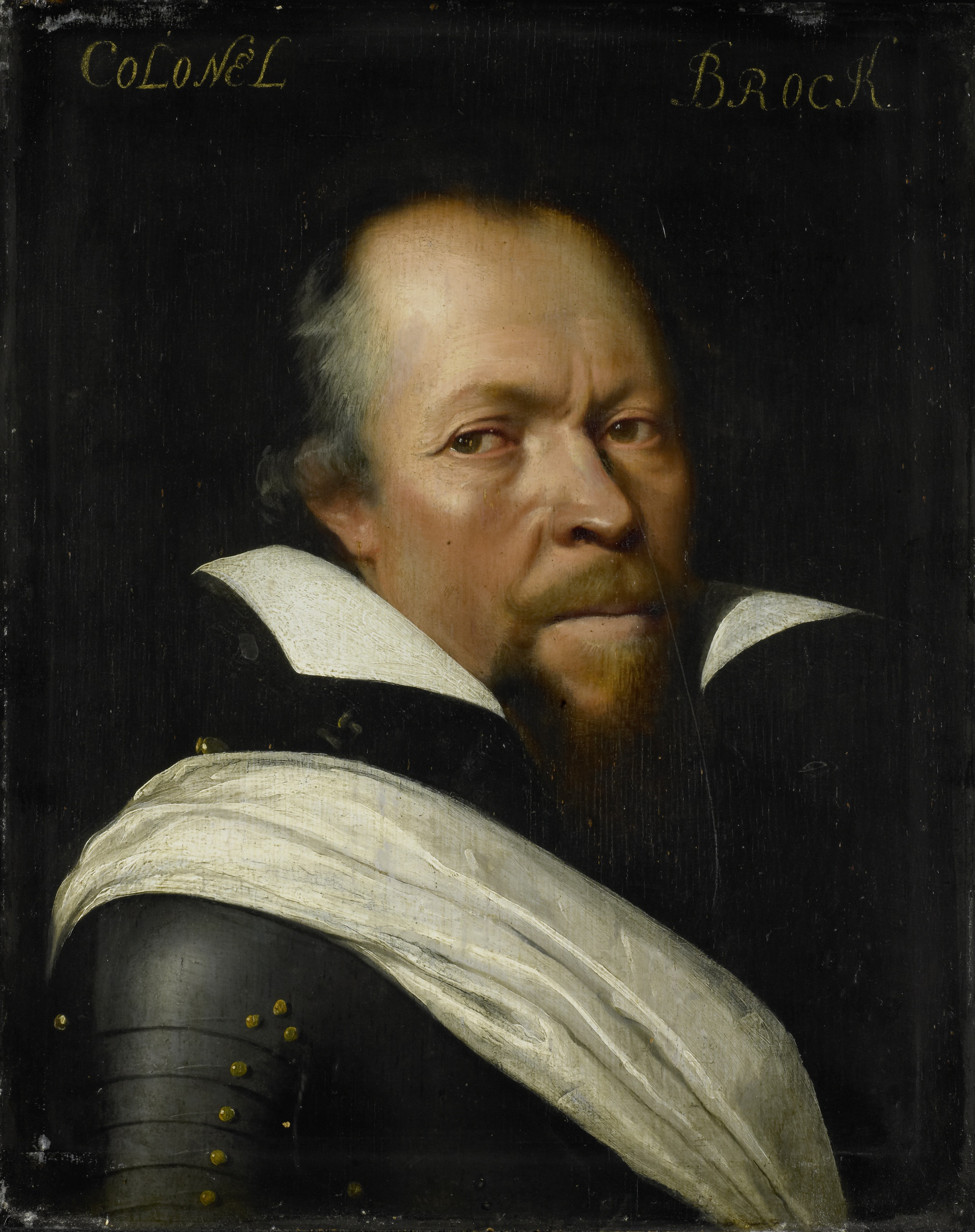
- Brog between 1609-1633, Jan Antonisz van Ravesteyn
- Died: 13 March 1636
- Allegiance: Kingdom of Scotland; United Provinces
- Branch: Scots Brigade
- Service years: c. 1588-1636
- Rank: Colonel
- Conflicts: Eighty Years' War: Siege of Maastricht, 1594; Cambrai, 1595; Siege of Bommel, 1599; Battle of Nieuwpoort, 1600; Siege of Ostend, 1601-1604; Siege of 's-Hertogenbosch, 1629; Thirty Years War

Colonel Sir William Brog (? - 13 March 1636) was a Scottish soldier in the service of the Kingdom of Scotland and the Dutch Republic. His early life is, at the moment, completely obscure and he only appears on record in 1588 when he rose to the rank of sergeant major in the regiment of Colonel Bartholomew Balfour. He was promoted to colonel of the first regiment of the Scots-Dutch Brigade in 1606 and held the position until 1636. Thus, he probably holds the record for the longest-serving Scottish colonel during the Eighty Years' War and the Thirty Years' War.

== Early Career, c. 1588-1600 ==
Like his early life, Brog's early career is also shrouded in mystery and confusion. On the one hand, James Ferguson records Brog as receiving his commission as captain on 31 March 1590 in succession to Captain David Trail. In the next sentence, Ferguson notes that he was in fact already sergeant-major (the modern equivalent of major) in 1588. That he was a sergeant-major in 1588 is further proved by his commission as sergeant-major, dated to 12 July of that year. The commission stated his pre-existing "ability and experience in the conduct of the war, and trusting [his] capacity and diligence" therein. Because the commission names Colonel Balfour (who served from 1586-1594), the dating can be taken to mean 1588 and not 1598. Thus, if the dating on the commission is correct, Brog would have been serving long before 1588.

Brog was present at the attack of Maastricht in March 1594. He, along with Captain Egger and four Dutch captains were ordered to make an amphibious assault on the suburb of Wyck. However, after some confusion, they heard that the guard in the town had been doubled and the captains decided to call off the attack, Brog insisting he would not "lead his men to certain butchery."

In 1595, Brog was specially appointed as sergeant-major to an auxiliary force under Justinus van Nassau to relieve Cambrai in a joint effort with Henry IV of France. Brog was also present at the siege of Bommel in 1599 and took a Spanish captain prisoner on an assault on its trenches. Sergeant-Major Brog, along with Colonel William Edmonds, and Captains Caddel, Henderson, and Kerr, was one of the few surviving officers after Nieuwpoort in July 1600, in which seven out of twelve Scottish captains were killed leading up to the siege.

In 1599, Brog was recommended by James VI and on 3 June 1600, Brog petitioned for the position of lieutenant-colonel in Col. Edmond's regiment. This, he insisted, was solely for honor, "without other pay." This was agreed to by Edmond and the government and by 29 December 1600 Brog was given 600 guilders outright and a salary of 100 guilders per month. Brog wrote to James VI on 24 May 1601.

In February 1602 a rumour circulated that the exiled rebel Earl of Bothwell had left Spain for the Low Countries and was trying to bribe Colonel Edmond or Brog, (who were said to be rivals in emulation), with their Scottish soldiers to join the Spanish service.

== The Siege of Ostend, 5 July 1601 – 20 September 1604 ==
Lieutenant-Colonel Brog was present at the Siege of Ostend between 1601-1604. It was there that Brog's hardiness and fortitude was noted in this particularly grim anecdote:

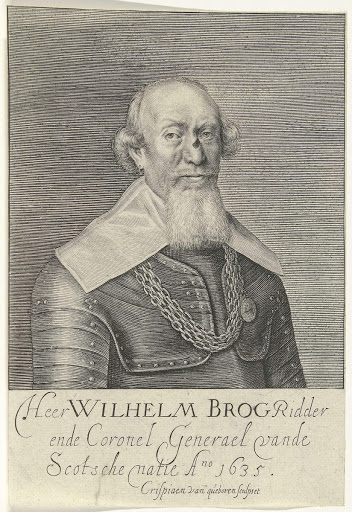
Colonel William Brog in 1635, with possible wound on nose from Chatillon's skull.

"When the gallant Comte de Chatillon, son of the great Coligny, standing on the top of the Sandhill on 10th September, along with Colonel Van der Noot, Colonel Uchtenbrook, and Brogh... [Chatillon] had the top of his head carried off by a cannon-ball, the fragments of his skull wounded Colonel Brogh in the face." See image at right for possible evidence of Brog's wound.

In August 1604, Brog and Adolphe van Gelder received instructions on the abandoning of the city. On 22 September 1604, the Scottish and English troops formed the rear-guard, "and were the last to leave the ground so long and obstinately defended."

== Brog's Regiment: Colonelcy, 1606-1636 ==
Sir William Brog took the colonelcy of the old regiment after the death of its former commander, Sir William Edmond. His salary was raised to 400 guilders/month and he retained command of his company until his death in 1636, despite being reported dead in 1623. Sir John Ogle mentioned Colonel Brog in a letter to William Trumbull in July 1614, Brog had brought news of the king's intentions.

In 1617, Brog was requested to resign from the brigade so that Walter Scott, 1st Earl of Buccleuch (whose father, Walter Scott, 1st Lord Scott of Buccleuch had been colonel of the second regiment from 1603-1612) could assume the colonelcy in reparation for debts owed to his father before his death. Perhaps the Earl also assumed he would take command of his father's regiment in 1612 after the Lord's death, but was instead passed up for the far more experienced Sir Robert Henderson. King James evidently believed Brog to be "pretty well up in years; and that he should retire from war." The issue continued until at least 1622. Brog came to the Hague from Scotland in January 1622, and Dudley Carleton wrote to the Duke of Buckingham that he was "most unwilling" to be pensioned off. On 30 September 1622 Frederick V of the Palatinate wrote to Elizabeth Stuart, Queen of Bohemia that "Colonel Brog will leave his regiment most reluctantly; but still it needs to be reformed."

Brog, of course, did not give up his regiment, and thus the third regiment was born in 1629. On 4 November 1631, Colonels William Brog, Sir David Balfour, and George Coutts intervened on behalf of the widow of Reverend Andrew Hunter for a pension of 100 guilders. They promised that they would then provide support for their ministers without help from the state as long as "this widow, during the short time that apparently she still has to live, be provided with necessary support." The letter is one of the only known letters to be signed by the colonels of all three regiments of the Brigade.

Sir William Brog died by 13 March 1636, ending a 30-year career as colonel and at least 48 years in the Brigade. He was succeeded as colonel by Sir James Sandilands and command of his company went to Captain James Williamson.

== Sources ==
- Abernethy, Jack, "Colonel Sir William Brog [SSNE 7842]" in Grosjean, A. and Murdoch, S., "Scotland, Scandinavia, and Northern Europe, 1580-1707" (SSNE)—Published online by the University of St Andrews at: https://www.st-andrews.ac.uk/history/ssne/index.php
- Akkerman, Nadine (ed.), The Correspondence of Elizabeth Stuart, Queen of Bohemia (2 Vols, Oxford 2015).
- Ferguson, J., Papers Illustrating the History of the Scots Brigade in the�service of the United Netherlands, 1572-1697 (Edinburgh, 1899).

== See also ==
- Scotland and the Thirty Years' War
- Horace Vere, 1st Baron Vere of Tilbury
