= David Drummond =

David Drummond may refer to:

- David Drummond, 2nd Lord Drummond (c. 1515–1571), see Earl of Perth#Lords Drummond of Cargill (1488)
- David Drummond (soldier) (1593–1638), Swedish general
- David Drummond (businessman) (born 1963), American executive
- David Drummond (minister) (1805–1877), Scottish minister and photographer
- David Drummond (physician) (1852–1932), Irish/British physician and academic
- David Drummond (politician) (1890–1965), member of the New South Wales Legislative Assembly in 1920
- David Drummond, 8th Earl of Perth (1907–2002), Scottish peer, banker, and politician
