= William Edmonds =

William Edmonds may refer to:

- William Edmonds (colonel) (died 1606), Scottish-born army officer in the Dutch States Army
- William Edmonds (MP) for Reading
- Bill Edmonds (1903–1968), Australian politician

== See also ==
- William Edmond (1755–1838), US Representative
- William Edmunds (disambiguation)
