= William Edmunds =

William Edmunds may refer to:

- William Edmunds (architect) (1801–1847), English architect
- William P. Edmunds (1885–1977), West Virginia University Mountaineers 14th head college football coach
- William Edmunds (actor) (1886–1981), stage and screen character actor
- Wil Edmunds (William Glyndwr Edmunds, born 1947), Welsh educationalist
- Bill Edmunds (1898–1964), English footballer

== See also ==
- William Edmonds (disambiguation)
