= Kalmar Regiment =

- Kalmar regemente
- Active: 1626–1709, 1709–1927, 1994–1997
- Country: Sweden
- Allegiance: Swedish Armed Forces
- Branch: Swedish Army
- Type: Infantry
- Size: Regiment
- Part of: 2nd Military District (1833–1893); 2nd Army Division (1893–1901); II Army Division (1902–1927); Southern Military District (1990–1997)
- Garrison/HQ: Kalmar
- Colors: Red and yellow
- March: "Kaiser-Friedrich-Marsch" (Friedemann) (Note: The march was adopted before 1900. It was taken over by Jönköping-Kalmar Regiment in 1928 and by the Northern Småland Group (Norra Smålandsgruppen) in 2000.)
- Battle honours: Varberg (1565), Narva (1581), Warszawa (1656), Tåget över Bält (1658), Kliszow (1702), Helsingborg (1710), Svensksund (1790)

Commanders
- Colonel, 1623-1627: Patrick Ruthven
- Colonel, 1627-1638: David Drummond
- Colonel, 1699-1700: Magnus Stenbock

Insignia
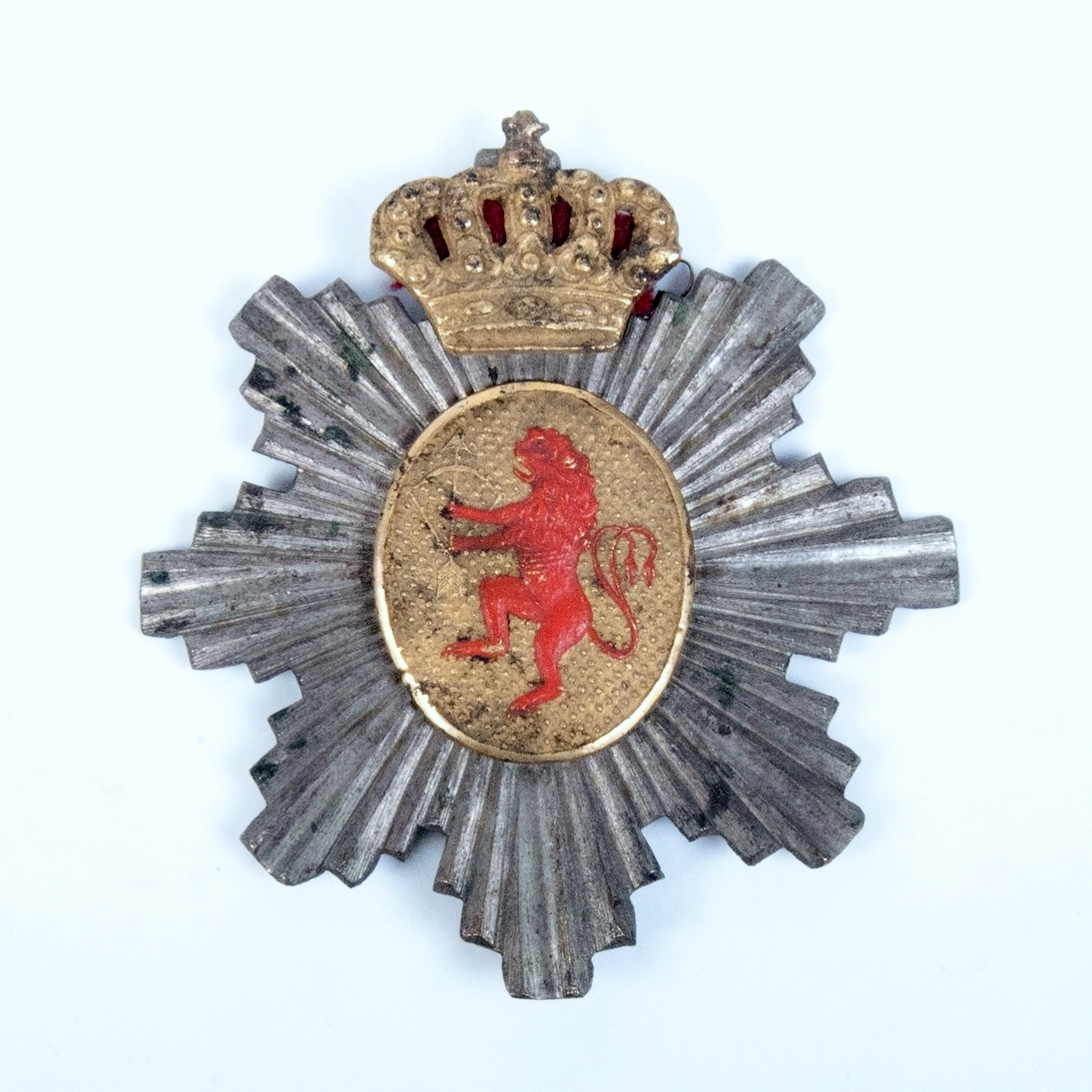
- Cap badge

The Kalmar Regiment (Swedish: Kalmar regemente), designations I 20, I 21 and Fo 18, was a Swedish Army infantry regiment that traced its origins back to the 16th century. It was merged with another unit to form a new regiment in 1928. It was later reraised and disbanded again in 1997. The regiment's soldiers were originally recruited from Kalmar County, and it was later garrisoned there.

== History ==
The regiment has its origins in fänikor (companies) raised in Kalmar County in the 16th century. In 1616, these units—along with fänikor from the nearby Kronoberg County—were organised by Gustav II Adolf into Smålands storregemente, of which twelve of the total 24 companies were recruited in Kalmar County. Smålands storregemente consisted of three field regiments, of which Kalmar Regiment was one. Sometime around 1623, the grand regiment was permanently split into three smaller regiments, of which Kalmar Regiment was one.

Kalmar Regiment was one of the original 20 Swedish infantry regiments mentioned in the Swedish constitution of 1634. The regiment's first commander was Patrick Ruthven, 1st Earl of Forth. The regiment was allotted in 1686. The regiment was given the designation I 20 (20th Infantry Regiment) in a general order in 1816. The designation was changed to I 21 in 1892.

The regiment was garrisoned in Eksjö from 1906, before it was merged with Jönköping Regiment to form Jönköping-Kalmar Regiment in 1927. Kalmar Regiment was reorganised in 1994 as a local defence district with the designation Fo 18, although disbanded again just three years later in 1997.

== Campaigns ==
- The Northern Seven Years' War (1563–1570) (Note: Participated as the various fänikor that later formed the regiment.)
- The Livonian War (1570–1582) (Note: Participated as the various fänikor that later formed the regiment.)
- The Polish War (1600–1629)
- The Thirty Years' War (1630–1648)
- The Northern Wars (1655–1661)
- The Scanian War (1674–1679)
- The Great Northern War (1700–1721)
- The Hats' Russian War (1741–1743)
- The Seven Years' War (1757–1762)
- The Gustav III's Russian War (1788–1790)
- The Franco-Swedish War (1805–1810)
- The Finnish War (1808–1809)
- The War of the Sixth Coalition (1813–1814)
- The Campaign against Norway (1814)

== Organisation ==
1686(?)

- Livkompaniet
- Överstelöjtnantens kompani
- Majorens kompani
- Östra Härads kompani
- Uppvidinge kompani
- Västra Härads kompani
- Aspolands härads kompani
- Konga härads kompani

18??

- Livkompaniet
- Vedbo kompani
- Aspelands kompani
- Östra Härads kompani
- Seveds kompani
- Uppvidinge kompani
- Västra Härads kompani
- Konga kompani

== Heraldry and traditions ==
=== Colours, standards and guidons ===
The regiment has carried a number of colours over the years. On 24 June 1866, major general P E Lovén presented a new colour to the two battalions of the regiment, which then replaced the previous colours. The colours were used until the disbandment of the regiment, and were carried by Jönköping-Kalmar Regiment (I 12) from 1928 to 1954. When Kalmar Regiment was re-raised in the form of a defense district staff, the regiment was assigned a new colour. The new Kalmar Regiment adopted the same colour as the Kalmar Regiment which was disbanded in 1927. However, the regiment did not inherit the 1866 colour, but was presented with a new colour model 1994. The colour was presented in Kalmar by the Chief of the Army, lieutenant general Åke Sagrén on 10 October 1992. It was used as regimental colour by Fo 18 until 15 December 1997. The colour is drawn by Bengt Olof Kälde and embroidered by machine and hand in insertion technique by Gunilla Hjort. Blazon: "On red cloth in the centre on a circular yellow shield the provincial badge of Smaland; a red lion rampant, armed blue, in the forepaws a red crossbow with a white arrow and black bow, string and trigger. On a yellow border at the upper side of the colour, battle honours (Varberg 1565, Narva 1581, Warszawa 1656, Tåget över Bält 1658, Kliszow 1702, Helsingborg 1710, Svensksund 1790) in red."

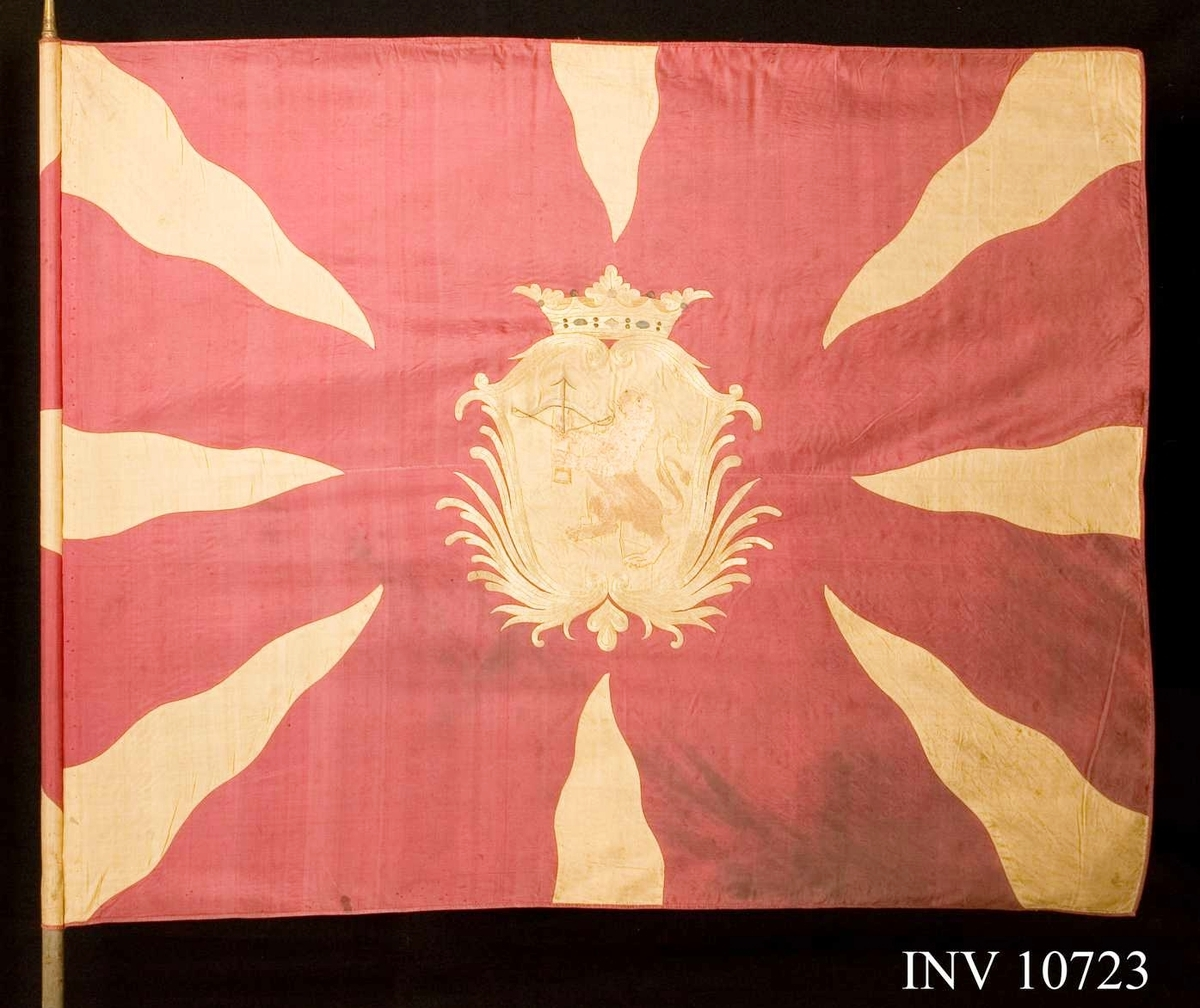
1766 colour of Kalmar Regiment.

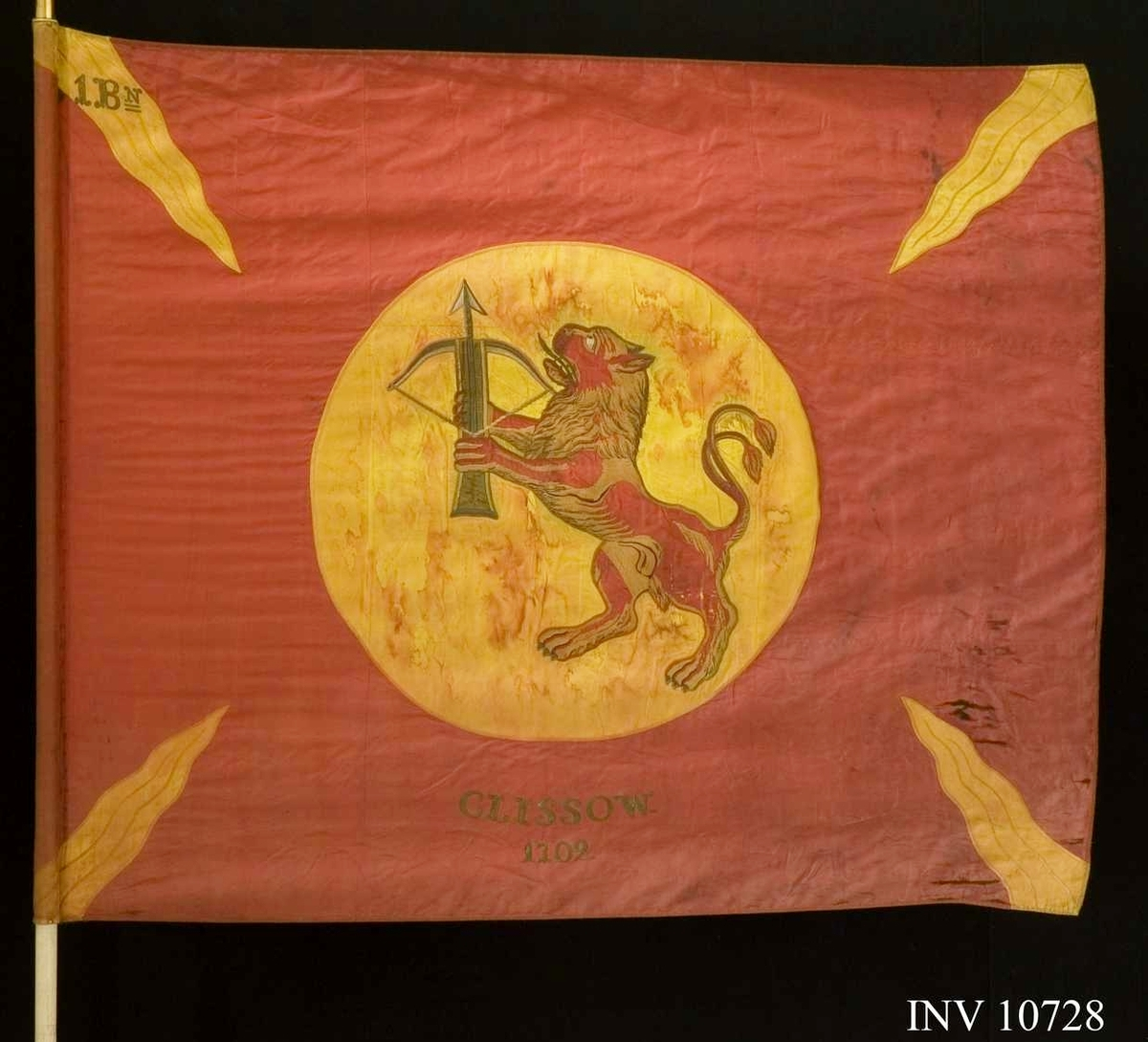
1849 colour of 1st Battalion, Kalmar Regiment.

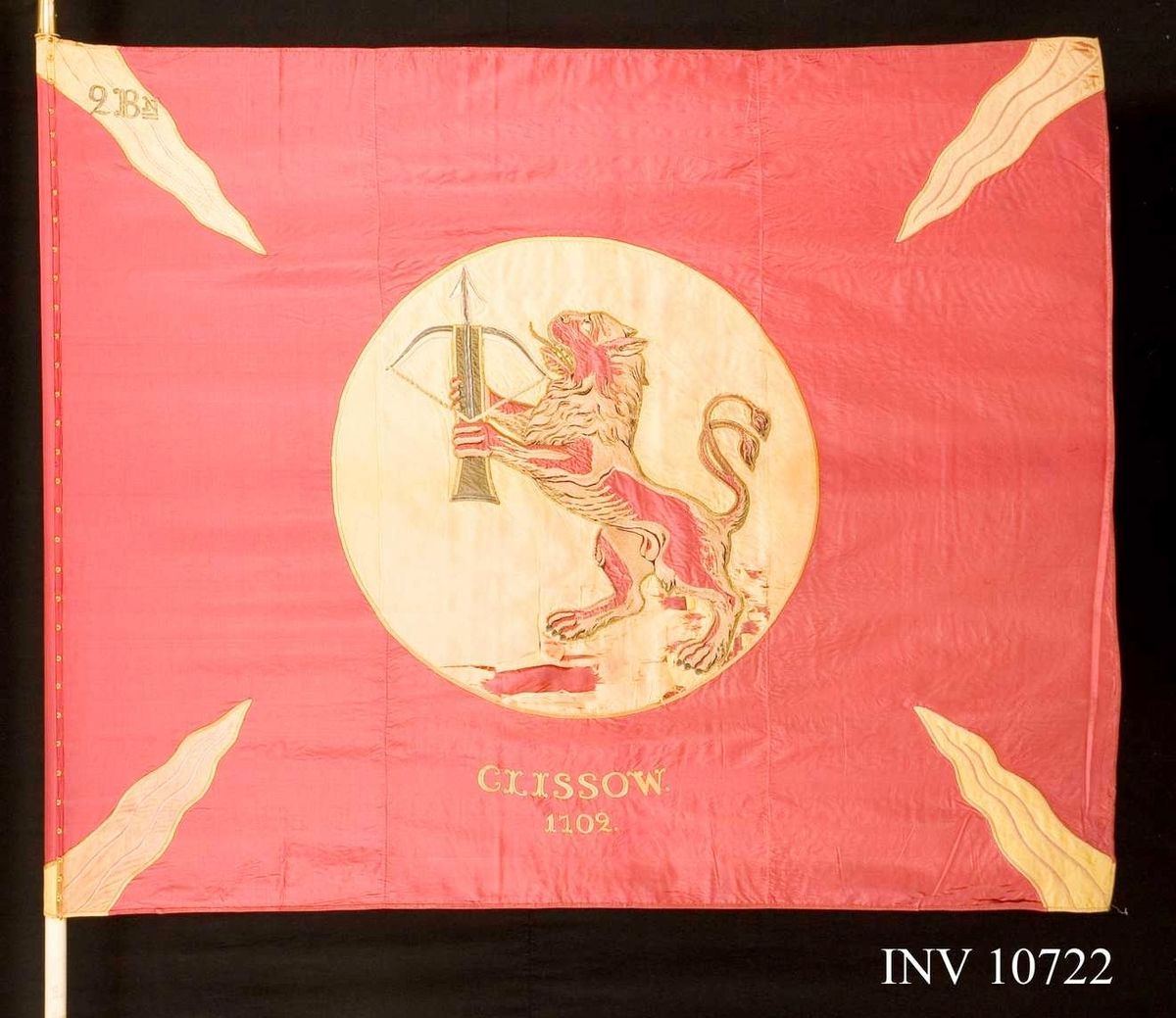
1849 colour of 2nd Battalion, Kalmar Regiment.

=== Coat of arms ===
The coat of the arms of the Kalmar Regiment (Fo 18) 1994–1997 and the Kalmar Group (Kalmargruppen) 1997–2004. Blazon: "Quarterly: I and IV or, the provincial badge of Småland, a double-tailed lion rampant gules, armed and langued azure, in the forepaws a cross-bow gules, arrow-head argent, bow and string sable. II and III azure, the provincial badge of Öland, a stag passant or, gorged with a necklace and armed, both gules. The shield surmounted two muskets in saltire or".

=== Medals ===
In 1997, the Kalmar regementes (Fo 18) minnesmedalj ("Kalmar Regiment (Fo 18) Commemorative Medal") in silver (KalmregSMM) of the 8th size was established. The medal ribbon is divided in red, yellow, red, yellow and red moiré.

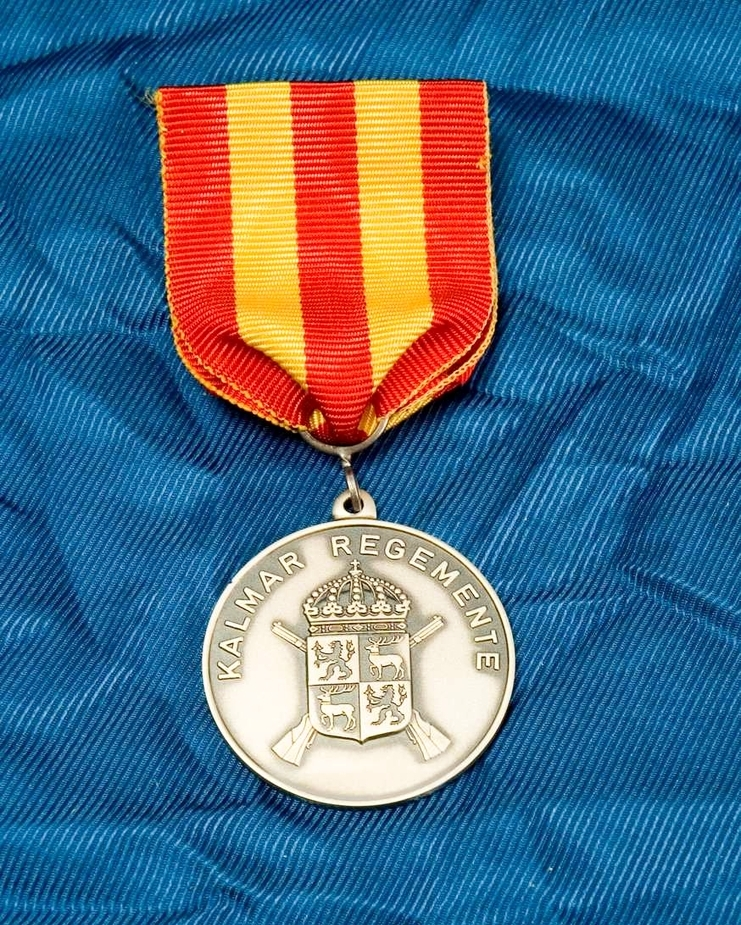
Kalmar Regiment Commemorative Medal in silver.

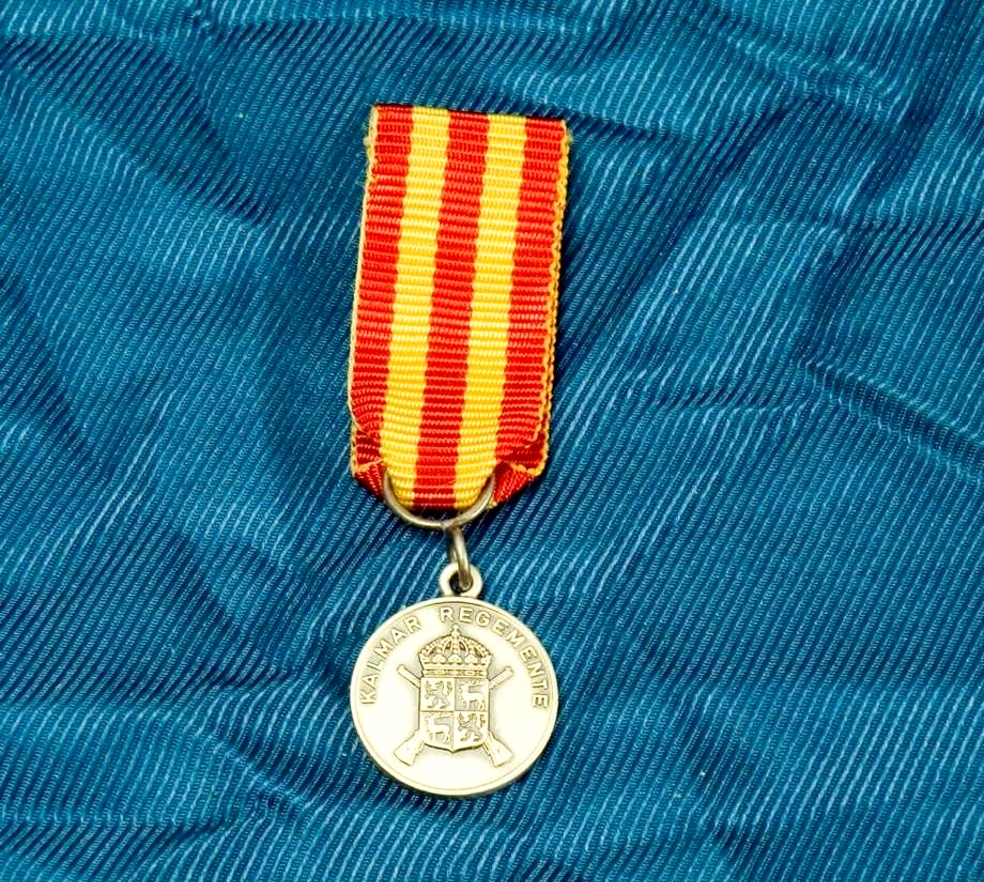
Miniature medal of the Kalmar Regiment Commemorative Medal in silver.

=== Heritage ===
In connection with the disbandment of Kalmar Regiment through the Defence Act of 1996, its traditions was continued from 1 December 1998 onwards by Kalmar Group (Kalmargruppen). From 1 July 2013, the Kalmar Battalion, within Kalmar and Kronoberg Group (Kalmar- och Kronobergsgruppen), is the traditional keeper of Kalmar Regiment.

=== Other ===
The original regiment had "Kalmar regementets marsch" (Meissner) and "Kaiser Friedrich-Marsch" (Friedemann) as their marches. The new Kalmar Regiment adopted the march "Kalmarbrigaden" (Badman), originally awarded to the Kalmar Brigade (IB 42).

== Commanding officers ==
Regimental commander active at the regiment during the years 1623–1927 and 1994–1997.

- 1623–16??: Patrick Ruthven
- 1630–1639: David Drummund
- 1639–1645: Thure Bremer
- 1645–1656: Alexander Irving
- 1656–1662: Gustaf Kruse
- 1662–1674: Barthold
- 1674–1677: Henrik Wulfvenkhu
- 1677–1686: Erik Soop
- 1686–1698: Hans v. Dellinghausen
- 1698–1699: Magnus Stenbock
- 1699–1700: Nils Djurklou
- 1700–1701: N Djurklow
- 1701–1709: G Ranck †
- 1709–1716: C Björnberg
- 1716–1730: S Sture (POW), †
- 1730–1733: G Zülich
- 1733–1734: F C Marschalk
- 1734–1736: L von Muners
- 1736–1739: C de Frumerie
- 1739–1740: A J Giertta
- 1740–1747: L Fahlström
- 1747–1757: C G von Roxendorff
- 1757–1757: N Djurlkou
- 1757–1770: E G Lillienberg
- 1770–1772: E Armfelt (never took position)
- 1772–1778: A W von Baltzar
- 1778–1779: F Posse
- 1779–1795: A D Schönström
- 1795–1802: C Mörner
- 1802–1804: A L von Frisendorff
- 1804–1816: J H Tavast
- 1812–1813: M F F Björnstjerna (acting)
- 1813–1814: C M Klingström (acting)
- 1816–1826: E G Ulfsparre
- 1826–1832: C M Klingström
- 1832–1847: C J Hederstierna
- 1847–1853: G E A Taube
- 1853–1859: G G H Stierngranat
- 1859–1865: F M L Dandenell
- 1865–1877: E O Weidenhielm
- 1871–1877: P S W Björkman (acting)
- 1877–1888: P S W Björkman
- 1888–1894: O G Nordenskjöld
- 1894–1895: H F Gyllenram
- 1895–1902: Fredrik Kugelberg
- 1902–1910: Carl Gustaf Knut Eklundh
- 1910–1914: Carl Adam Constans Stålhammar
- 1914–1926: Sam Gustaf Laurentius Myhrman
- 1926–1927: Natanael Wikander
- 1990–1994: Birger Jägtoft
- 1994–1995: Birger Jägtoft
- 1995–1997: Dan Albin Snell

== Names, designations and locations ==
Name	Translation	From		To
Kungl. Kalmar regemente	Royal Kalmar Regiment	1623-??-??	–	1709-07-01
Kungl. Kalmar regemente	Royal Kalmar Regiment	1709-??-??	–	1927-10-01
Avvecklingsorganisation	Decommissioning Organisation	1927-10-02	–	1927-12-31
Kalmar försvarsområde	Kalmar Defense District	1990-07-01	–	1994-06-30
Kalmar regemente	Kalmar Regiment	1994-07-01	–	1997-12-31
Designation		From		To
№ 20		1816-10-01	–	1892-12-31
№ 21		1893-01-01	–	1914-09-30
I 21		1914-10-01	–	1927-12-31
Fo 18		1990-07-01	–	1997-12-31
Locations		From		To
Staby ängar		1685-??-??	–	1783-??-??
Mariannelund		1783-??-??	–	1796-03-14
Hultsfred		1796-03-14	–	1906-11-01
Kulltorp		1844-06-03	–	1884-01-26
Eksjö Garrison		1919-10-01	–	1927-12-31
Kalmar Airport		1990-07-01	–	1997-12-31

== See also ==
- List of Swedish infantry regiments
