= Småland Regiment =

Coordinates: 57°40′20″N 14°58′31″E

- Smålands regemente
- Active: 1928–2000
- Country: Sweden
- Allegiance: Swedish Armed Forces
- Branch: Swedish Army
- Type: Infantry
- Size: Regiment
- Part of: Eastern Brigade (1928–1937); I Army Division (1938–1942); I Military District (1942–1966); Southern Military District (1966–2000)
- Garrison/HQ: Eksjö
- Motto(s): Smålands söner – till rikets värn (Note: Was inherited by Ing 2. Also used by the 33rd Home Guard Battalion.) ("Småland's sons - to the defense of the kingdom")
- Colours: Red and yellow
- March: "Kaiser Friedrich-Marsch" (Friedemann) (Note: The march was inherited from Kalmar Regiment, and was established in 1953 by Army Order 33/1953.)
- Battle honours: Lützen (1632), Wittstock (1636), Warsaw (1656), Landskrona (1677), Klisow (1702), Malatitze (1708), Hälsingborg (1710)

Insignia
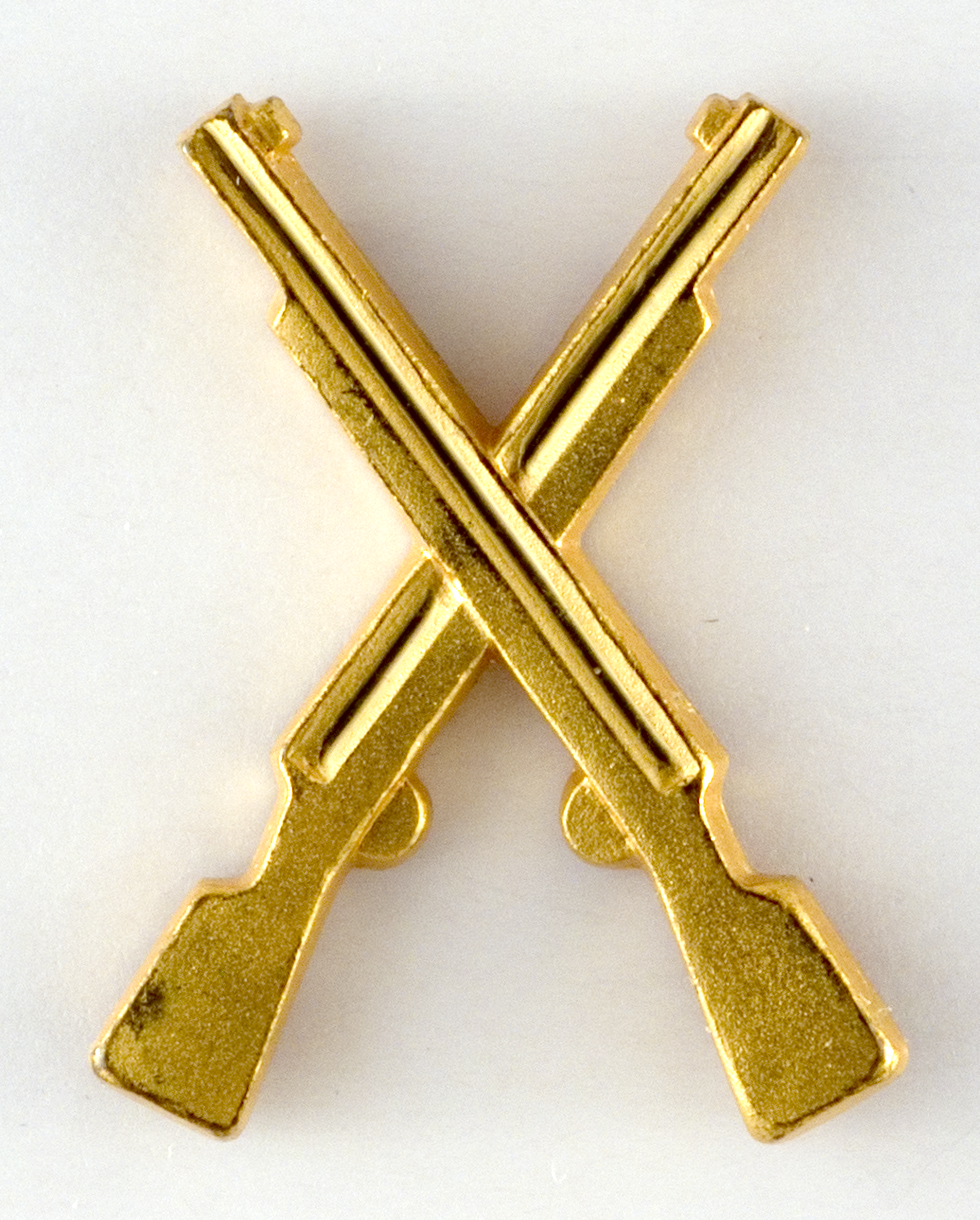
- Branch insignia m/60

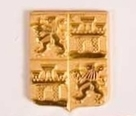
- Unit insignia m/60

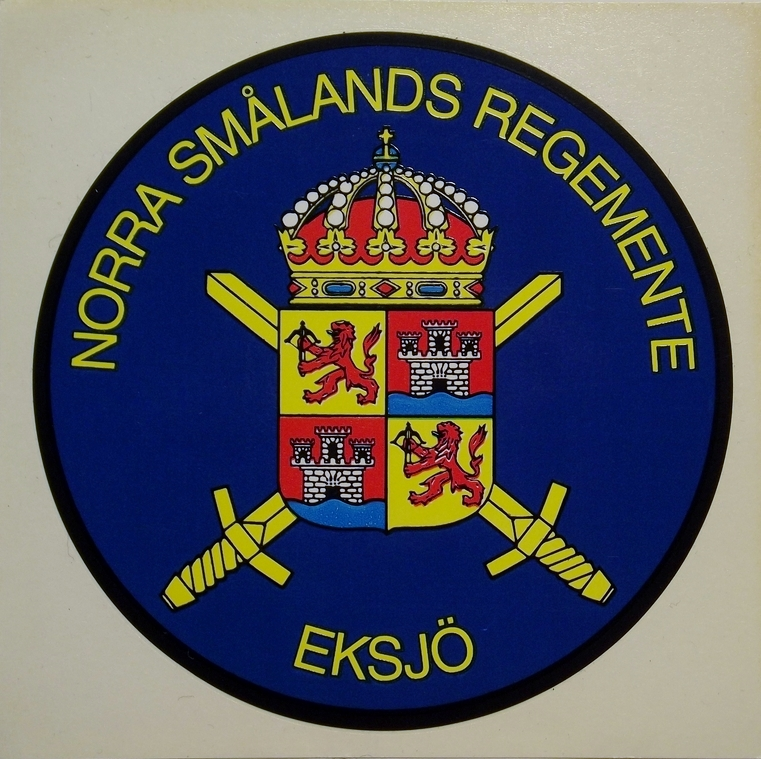
- Shoulder sleeve insignia

The Småland Regiment (Swedish: Smålands regemente), designations I 12 and I 12/Fo 17, was a Swedish Army infantry regiment that traced its origins back to the 16th century. The unit was disbanded as a result of the disarmament policies set forward in the Defence Act of 2000.

== History ==
The regiment was formed in 1928 as Jönköping-Kalmar Regiment (I 12), following a merger of Jönköping Regiment (I 12), and the Kalmar Regiment (I 21). The regiment moved the same year to the Eksjö garrison.

In 1948 the regiment changed its name to Northern Småland Regiment (I 12). On 1 July 1974, the regiment formed with Jönkoping Defence District (Jönköpings försvarsområde, Fo 17) a defensive field regiment to be known as the 12/Fo 17. When both the Kronoberg Regiment (I 11) and Kalmar Regiment (For 18) were disbanded in 1997, Småland Regiment took over responsibility for Kronoberg Defence District (Kronobergs försvarsområde, Fo 16) and Kalmar Defence District (Kalmar försvarsområde, Fo 18) and integrated the Jönkoping Defence District, which then formed Småland Defence District (Smålands försvarsområde, For 17).

== Heraldry and traditions ==
=== Colours, standards and guidons ===
When the regiment was raised it carried two colours from the two disbanded regiments Jönköping Regiment and Kalmar Regiment. A new regimental colour was presented to the Northern Småland Regiment (I 12) in Eksjö by His Majesty the King Gustaf VI Adolf on 11 September 1954 which replaced the two older ones. It was used as regimental colour by I 12 until 1 July 2000. The colour is drawn by Brita Grep and embroidered by hand in insertion technique probably by the company Libraria. The battle honours from the two previous regiments were now added to the new colour. Blazon: "On a quarterly cloth on the first and fourth bays the provincial badge of Småland; on yellow a red lion rampant, armed blue, in the forepaws a red crossbow with white arrowhead and black bow, string and trigger (a legacy from the former Kalmar Regiment, I 21), on the second and third bays the town badge of Jönköping; on red, from a blue wavy base a tripletowered white castle embattled issuant, windows and gates black and a hoisted white gate grill (a legacy from the former Jönköping Regiment, I 12). On a red border at the upper side of the colour, battle honours (Lützen 1632, Wittstock 1636, Warsaw 1656, Landskrona 1677, Klisow 1702, Malatitze 1708, Hälsingborg 1710 in yellow."

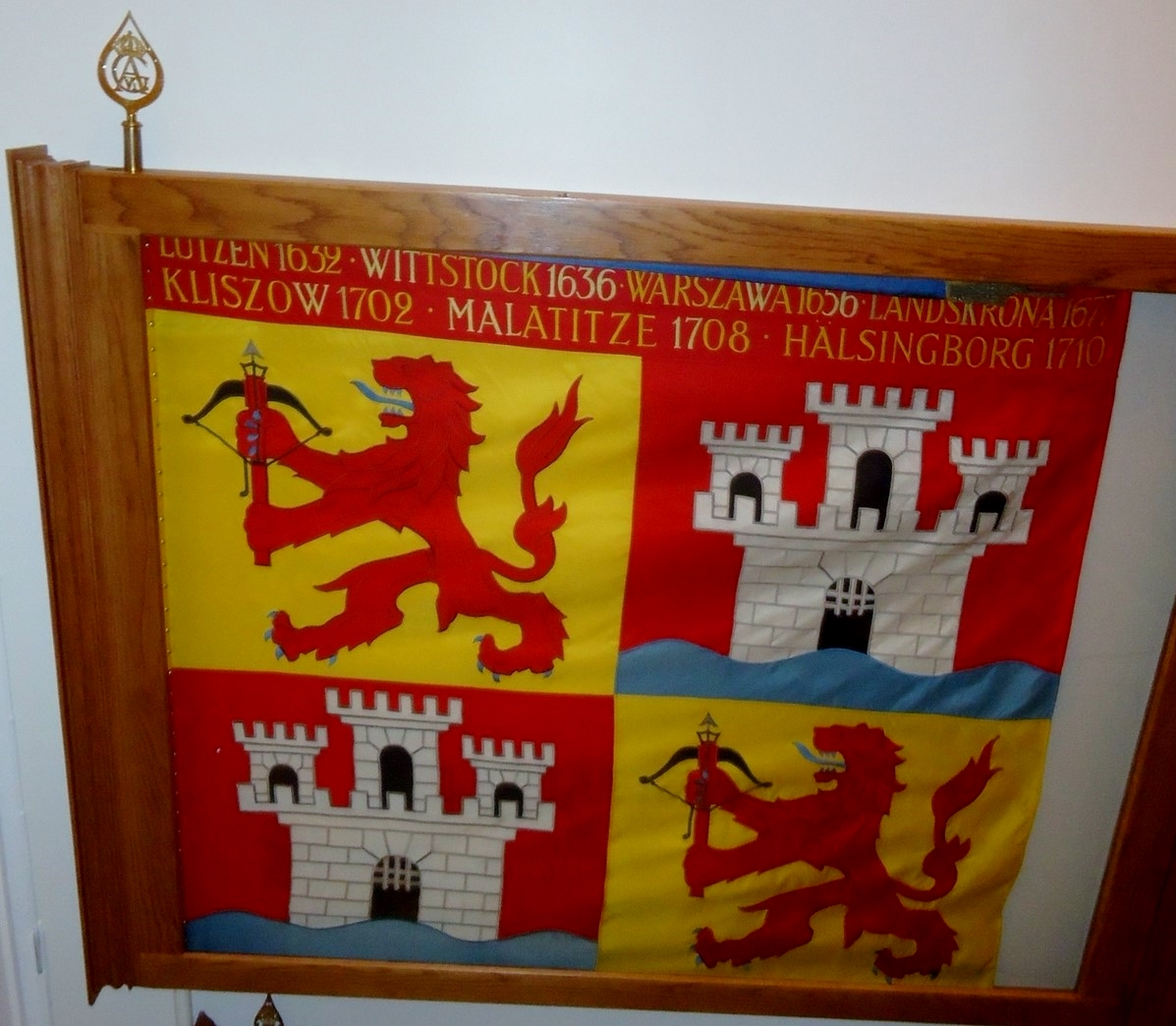
The 1954 regimental colour.

=== Coat of arms ===
The coat of the arms of the Northern Småland Regiment (I 12/Fo 17) 1977–1994. Blazon: "Quarterly: I and IV or, the provincial badge of Småland, a double-tailed lion rampant gules armed and langued azure, in the forepaws a crossbow gules, arrow-head argent, bow and string sable. II and III gules, the town badge of Jönköping, from a wavy base azure a castle triple-towered and embattled issuant argent; masoned of the first. Windows and portcullis sable and raised gate grill argent. The shield surmounted two muskets in saltire or". The coat of arms of the Northern Småland Regiment (I 12/Fo 17) 1994–1998, Småland Regiment (I 12/Fo 17) 1998–2000 and the Northern Småland Group (Norra Smålandsgruppen) since 2000. Blazon: "Quarterly: I and IV or, the provincial badge of Småland, a double-tailed lion rampant gules armed and langued azure, in the forepaws a crossbow gules, arrow-head argent, bow and string sable. II and III gules, the town badge of Jönköping, from a wavy base azure a castle triple towered and embattled issuant argent; masoned of the first. Windows and portcullis sable and raised gate grill argent. The shield surmounted two swords in saltire or".

Coat of arms of the Northern Småland Regiment (I 12/Fo 17) 1977–1994.

Coat of the arms of the Northern Småland Regiment (I 12/Fo 17) 1994–1998, Småland Regiment (I 12/Fo 17) 1998–2000 and the Northern Småland Group (Norra Smålandsgruppen) 2000–present.

=== Medals ===
In 2000, the Smålands regementes (I 12) och Smålandsbrigadens (IB 12) minnesmedalj ("Småland Regiment (I 12) and Småland Brigade (IB 12) Commemorative Medal") in silver (SmålregbrigSMM) of the 8th size was established. The medal has different obverses. The medal ribbon is of yellow moiré with broad red edges and a blue stripe on the middle and a red line on each side.

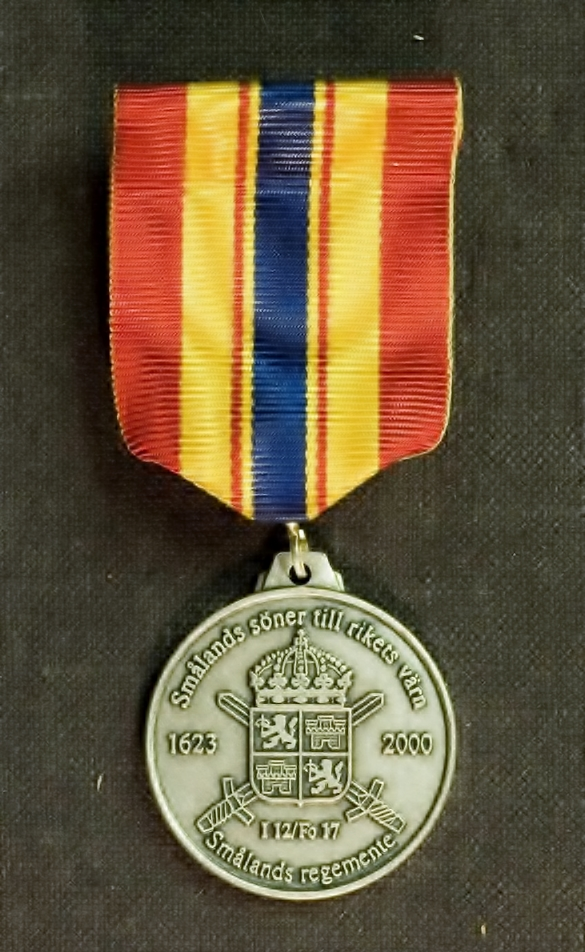
The Småland Regiment (I 12) and Småland Brigade (IB 12) Commemorative Medal

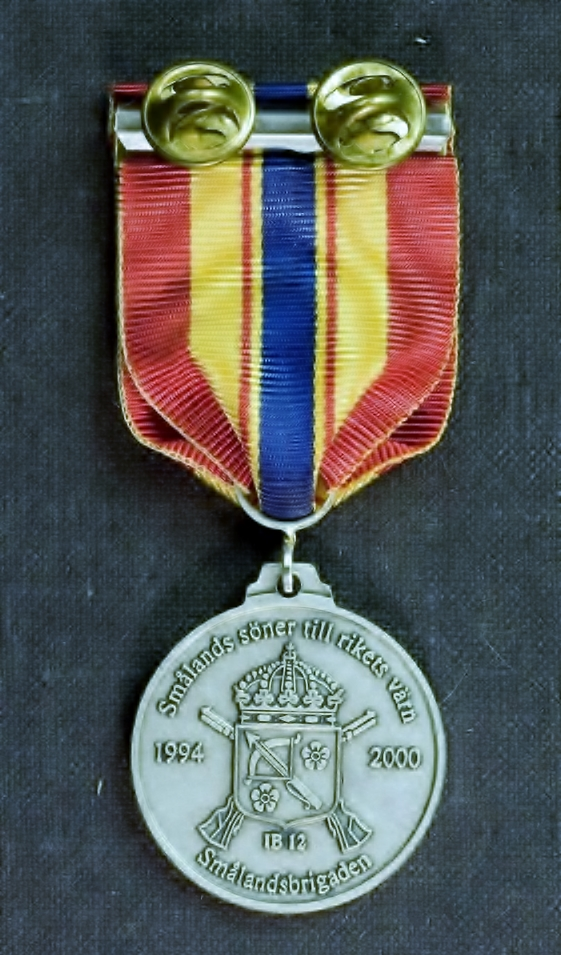
The Småland Regiment (I 12) and Småland Brigade (IB 12) Commemorative Medal

Ribbon bar

=== Heritage ===
The regiment continued the traditions of Jönköping Regiment and Kalmar Regiment, and from 1985 the memory of the Småland Artillery Regiment was retained at the regiment. When Kalmar Regiment was raised again in 1994, the traditions were continued by the new regiment. After the regiment and the Småland Brigade (Smålandsbrigaden, IB 12) was disbanded, its traditions were continued by Northern Småland Group (Norra Smålandsgruppen, NSG). From 1 July 2013, Northern Småland Battalion, within the Northern Småland Group, is the traditional keeper of Småland Regiment.

== Commanding officers ==
Regimental officers active at the regiment from 1928 to 2000.

=== Commanders ===
- 1928–1935: Fredrik Lovén
- 1935–1938: Hjalmar Falk
- 1938–1942: Sixten Wockatz
- 1939–1940: Sven Ryman (acting)
- 1942–1945: Gunnar Hagbergh
- 1945–1949: Nils Ludvig Verner Göth
- 1949–1952: Hadar Folke Johannes Cars
- 1952–1958: Per Alvar Haldan Lindencrona
- 1958–1963: Gösta Vilhelm Sahlén
- 1963–1970: Carl Werner Robert Liborius von Mentzer
- 1970–1976: Nils Fredrik Haegerström
- 1976–1978: Stig Sjögren
- 1978–1984: Senior colonel Lars Anders Andersson
- 1984–1987: Sven Erik Anton Nilsson
- 1987–1991: Torbjörn Tillman
- 1991–1991: Karl Olof Eklöf
- 1992–1999: Wilhelm af Donner
- 1999–2000: Thore Ingvar Levin Bäckman

=== Deputy commanders ===
- 1976–????: Colonel Tore Bremer

== Names, designations and locations ==
| Name | Translation | From | | To |
|---|---|---|---|---|
| Kungl Jönköpings-Kalmar regemente | Royal Jönköping-Kalmar Regiment | 1928-01-01 | – | 1948-06-30 |
| Kungl Norra Smålands regemente | Royal Northern Småland Regiment | 1948-07-01 | – | 1974-12-31 |
| Norra Smålands regemente | Northern Småland Regiment | 1975-01-01 | – | 1997-12-31 |
| Smålands regemente | Småland Regiment | 1998-01-01 | – | 2000-06-30 |
| Avvecklingsorganisation Småland | Decommissioning Organisation Småland | 2000-07-01 | – | 2001-03-31 |
| Designation | | From | | To |
| I 12 | | 1928-01-01 | – | 1974-06-30 |
| I 12/Fo 17 | | 1974-07-01 | – | 2000-06-30 |
| AO Små | | 2000-07-01 | – | 2001-03-31 |
| Locations | | From | | To |
| Eksjö Garrison/Regementsgatan | | 1928-01-01 | – | 1994-06-30 |
| Eksjö Garrison/Stockholmsvägen | | 1994-07-01 | – | 2001-03-31 |

== See also ==
- List of Swedish infantry regiments
