= Siege of 's-Hertogenbosch =

1629 part of the Eighty Years' War

- Part of the Eighty Years' War and the Anglo–Spanish War
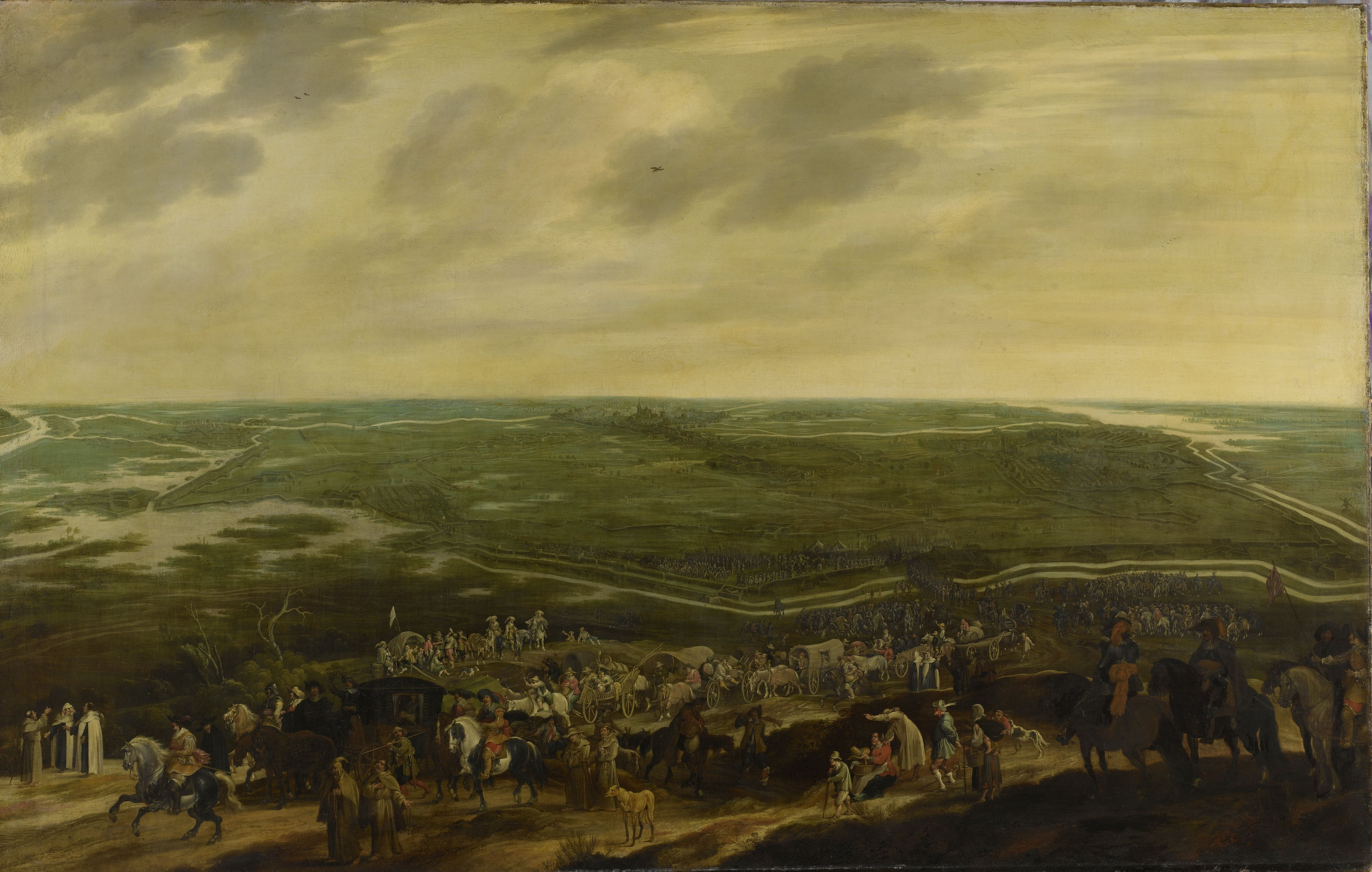
- The defeated Spanish garrison leaving 's-Hertogenbosch, 17 September 1629 by Paulus van Hillegaert (I) (1635)
Date	30 April 1629 – 14 September 1629
Location	's-Hertogenbosch 51°42′N 5°19′E
Result	Dutch victory

Belligerents
Spain	Dutch Republic

Commanders and leaders
Garrison (Spanish Empire) Anthonie Schetz; Field army (Spanish Empire) Hendrik van den Bergh (Spanish Relief Army)	(Dutch Republic) Frederick Henry (Dutch Republic) Ernest Casimir

Strength
Total: 7,000 3,000 infantry 4,000 armed civilians	Total: 28,000 24,000 infantry 4,000 cavalry 116 cannons

Casualties and losses
1,200 killed 1,200 diseased and injured	Unknown

The siege of 's-Hertogenbosch also known as the siege of Bois-Le-Duc was an action in 1629, during the Eighty Years' War and the Anglo–Spanish War in which a Dutch army captured the city of 's-Hertogenbosch. The city had been loyal to the King of Spain since 1579 and was part of the Spanish Netherlands.

== Background ==
The Twelve Years' Truce ended in 1621. Stadtholder Maurice of Orange had in the meantime played a part in instigating the Thirty Years' War in Germany. The Habsburgs tried to punish the rebellious Dutch Republic by cutting it off from its hinterland by a land blockade. 's-Hertogenbosch was the main fortress in this perimeter and enormous sums of money were poured into the improvement of its defences. As the ground surrounding the city was a marsh, the city was generally deemed to be impregnable, as the water-saturated soil seemed to make an application of current siege methods impossible; trench-digging and undermining were apparently out of the question. Maurice had failed four times in taking the city.

The blockade caused an economic crisis for the Republic and it reacted by trying to harm the enemy in its colonies. In 1628 one of the many schemes undertaken met with spectacular success when Admiral Piet Hein of the Dutch West India Company captured the Spanish treasure fleet. The vastly improved financial situation of the Republic allowed for a major counter-strike and Stadtholder Frederick Henry decided to break the Habsburg morale by conquering their main stronghold in the Netherlands. This came very unexpectedly; most had predicted the goal of his campaign would be Breda, which had been retaken by the Habsburgs in 1625.

== Siege ==
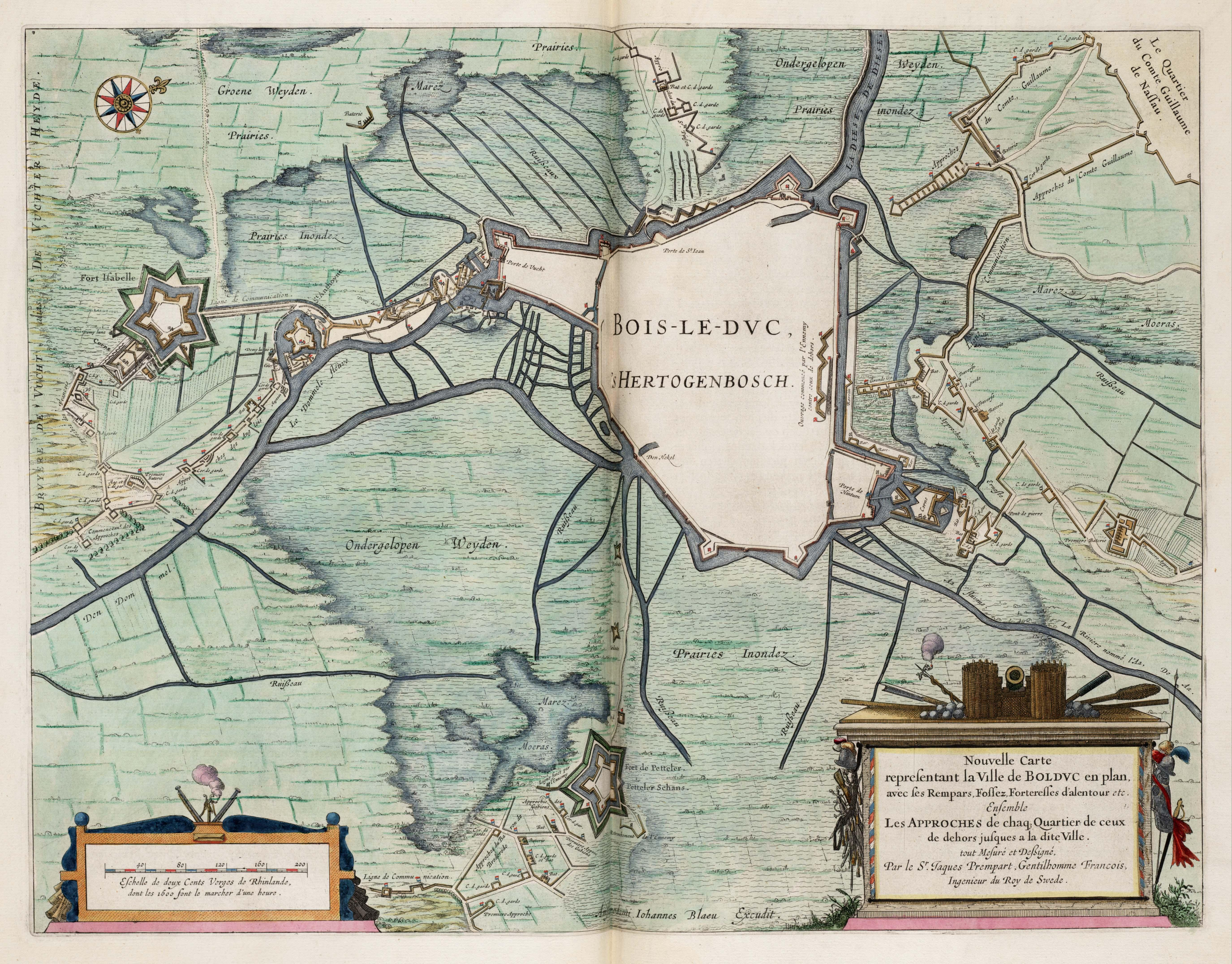
Map of the siege of Den Bosch in 1629. Joan Blaeu.

Advancing from Grave Frederick Henry laid siege to the city in April 1629, with an army of 24,000 infantry and 4,000 cavalry. Among them were between c.13-14,000 troops from Britain, the English being commanded by Horace Vere, Edward Cecil, Sir Charles Morgan, Edward Harwood, while the Scots were commanded by William Brog, Walter Scott, 1st Earl of Buccleuch, Sir George Hay of Kinfauns, and Sir John Halkett (who was killed at the siege). Frederick Henry had also hired 4,000 peasants and these would cause a tactical surprise. He diverted the two main streams feeding the swamps (the Dommel and the Aa) around the city by means of a double forty kilometre dike, in the form of a giant square, completely enclosing the fortress. Thus having created a polder, he began to drain it with (mainly horse) mills. After the soil had sufficiently dried out his trenches could approach the city walls. Noble visitors from all over Europe visited the siege to admire the novel and spectacular method.

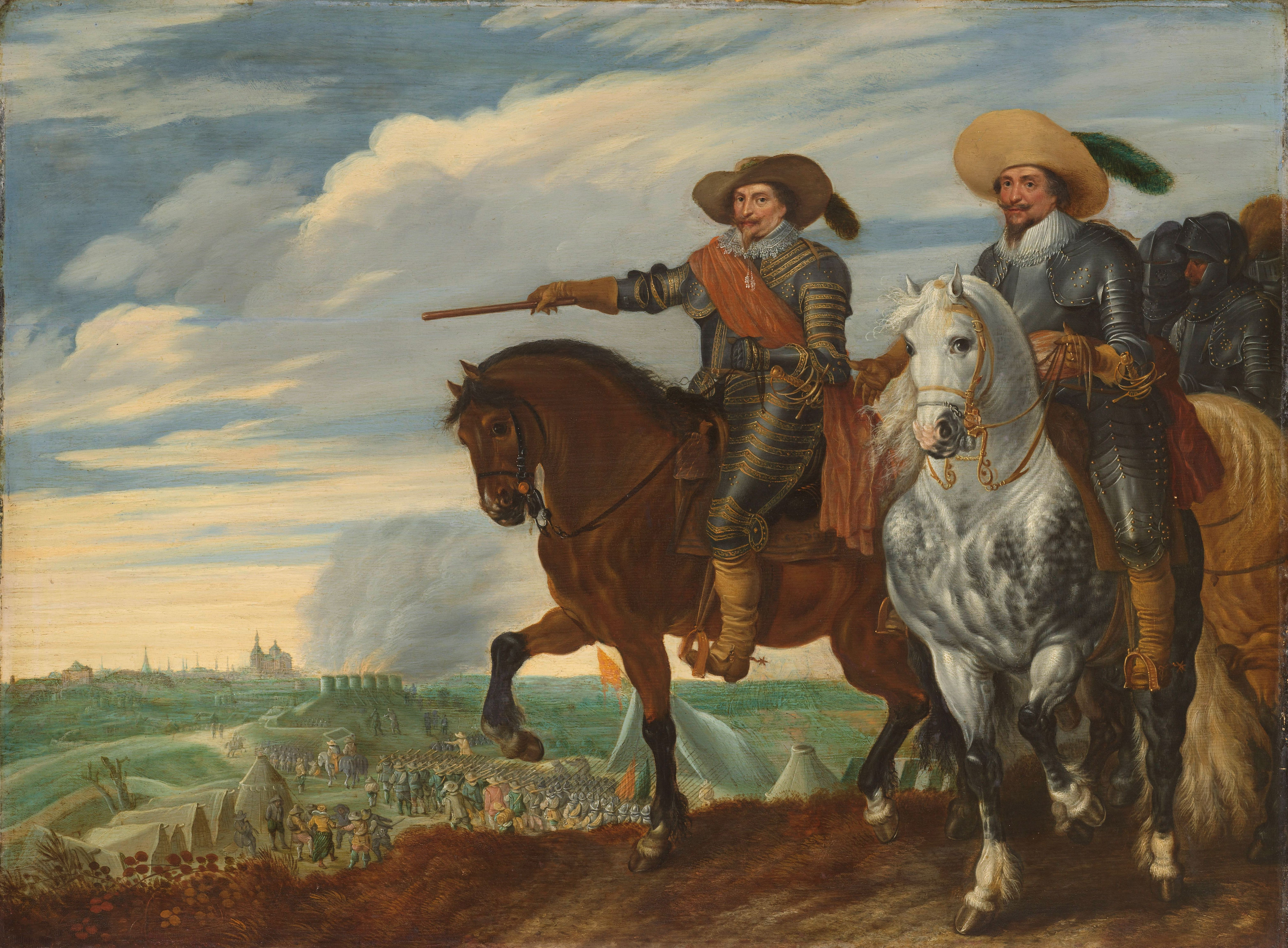
Frederick Henry, Prince of Orange and Ernst Casimir at the siege of 's-Hertogenbosch.

Of course the Habsburg authorities didn't remain idle while their main bulwark was being reduced. They sent a large relief army under command of Frederick Henry's Catholic cousin Hendrik van den Bergh, reaching the city in July. Van den Bergh quickly found out that his cousin's circumvallation, successfully tested at the siege of Grol in 1627, was too strong to breach. He tried to lure Frederick Henry away by invading the Republic through the Veluwe, capturing Amersfoort on 14 August. When his supply base at Wesel was taken, he had to withdraw.

Meanwhile, the Protestant forces dug themselves ever closer to the city along the southern road from the direction of Vught, continuously bombarding the defences. During the siege 28,517 cannonballs were fired. On 18 July the large Fortress Isabella fell, followed the next day by Fort Anthony. Despite repeated sallies by the 2,500 men of the garrison, the attackers slowly worked their way to the southern city gate. There they undermined Bastion Vught; in the early hours of 11 September a massive explosion caused a large breach in the ramparts. On 14 September its military governor Anthonie Schetz surrendered the city.

== Aftermath ==
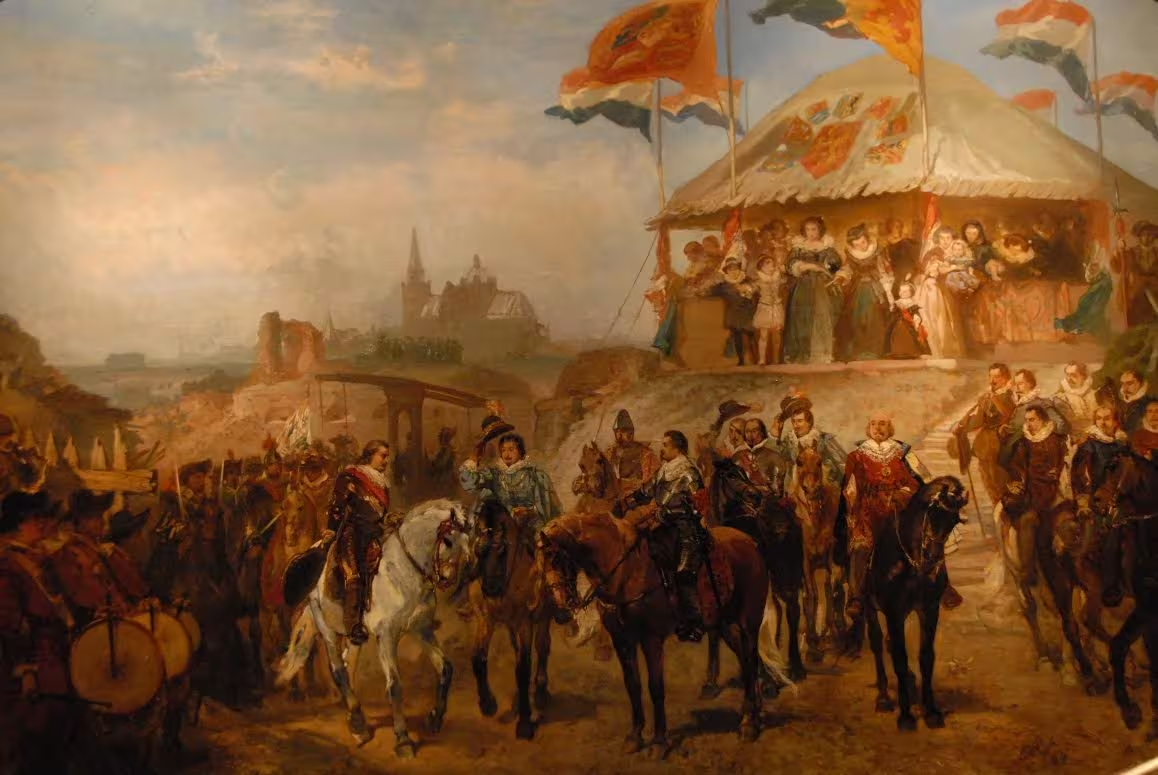
Exodus of the Spanish garrison from Den Bosch, 1629. By Charles Rochussen

Bishop Michael Ophovius tried to plead with Frederick Henry for religious tolerance, but though the stadtholder himself would gladly have granted religious freedom to the Catholics, as he tried to gain popularity in the Spanish Netherlands in the hope support for the rebellion would grow, due to vehement Calvinist resistance it had already been decided to be as strict in this respect as in the rest of the Republic; only nunneries could remain until the last nun of those present in 1629 had died.

The fall of 's-Hertogenbosch was an enormous blow to the prestige of the Spanish monarchy and the worst defeat in the North since the Spanish Armada in 1588. As a result, their position in the North would soon crumble and Frederick Henry, encouraged by the success, would start a series of other sieges, assisted by his cousin Van den Bergh, who changed sides after being accused of treason. Many of the English soldiers who fought during the siege would become prominent during the English Civil Wars. These were Thomas Fairfax, Jacob Astley, Philip Skippon, Thomas Glemham, George Monck as well as Henry Hexham, the historian of the Dutch wars. Fairfax, Skippon, and Monck, particularly, were Vere's pupils in the art of war.

Although its population would remain predominantly Catholic, 's-Hertogenbosch would stay firmly in the hands of the Republic as part of the Generality Lands until French revolutionary forces captured it in 1794; only then would the Batavian Republic grant equality to Catholics. The former Duchy of Brabant remains divided to this day between Belgium (Flemish Brabant, Brussels, the province of Antwerp and Walloon Brabant) and the Netherlands (North Brabant).
