= Arvid Forbus =

17th-century Finnish General

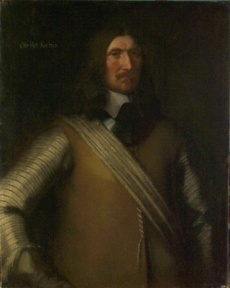
- Painting of Arvid Forbus
- Born: 1598; Porvoo, Swedish Finland
- Died: May 29, 1665 (aged 66–67); Stettin, Swedish Pomerania
- Burial place: Riddarholmen Church
- Spouse: Margareta Boije
- Children: Jakob Henrik Forbus; Johan Mattias Forbus; Anna Catharina Forbus; Sofia Juliana Freiin Forbus
- Military career
- Allegiance: (yes) Swedish Empire
- Service years: 1632-1659
- Rank: General
- Units: Nyland Regiment; Pori Regiment
- Conflicts: Thirty Years' War; Siege of Wolgast; Battle of Nördlingen; Bernard's Upper Rhine Campaign; Battle of Rheinfelden; Battle of Breisach; Dano-Swedish War (1657–1658); Dano-Swedish War (1658-1660)

Baron Arvid Forbus was a Swedish general of Scottish descent, he was born in Porvoo in 1598, and died May 29, 1665, in Stettin. Arvid was a member of Clan Forbes.

== Life ==
Forbus was born in Porvoo, in Swedish Finland, he was the son of Ernald Forbus and Karin Mattsdotter Björnram. His father had immigrated from Scotland to Finland. He would begin his military service as a lieutenant in the Nyland Regiment and later became a captain in the Pori Regiment in 1630. He served at the Siege of Wolgast in 1630, under the command of Dodo zu Knyphausen.

Forbus was promoted to Lieutenant Colonel in 1631 and later commanded a recruited regiment. Forbus's regiment would serve under Bernard of Saxe-Weimar at the Battle of Nördlingen. Following the battle he was given command of a regiment stationed at Sachsenhausen, a suburb of Frankfurt am Main.

In 1635, Forbus joined Bernard's Weimaran Army, there he distinguished himself at the Battles of Rheinfelden and Breisach. Following Bernard's death in July 1638, Forbus returned to Sweden.

In 1641, Forbus became commandant of Western Pomeranian, in 1646 he promoted to Major General, and in 1648 Pomeranian Deputy Commander. In 1650, he was appointed to the Council of War and in 1653 to the National Council. During Karl X Gustav's Danish War, he organized Southern Sweden's military service, and in 1658, was appointed General.

During the Second Danish War, he accompanied the King and he was briefly a commander of in Skåneland. On May 29, 1665, Forbus died in Stettin, he was aged about either 66 or 67.

=== Family ===
In June 1639, Forbus married Margareta Boije in Turku. They would have four children:

- Jakob Henrik Forbus
- Johan Mattias Forbus
- Anna Catharina Forbus
- Sofia Juliana Freiin Forbus; married Axel Julius De la Gardie.

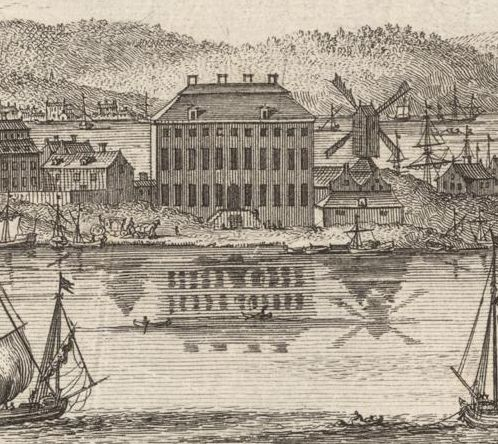
Forbus Plata in the Suecia Antiqua et Hodierna, in 1698

=== Land ===
In Finland, he owned the Kokemäki Estate, of which he was granted the title of Baron in 1652, and the Jackarby manor in Porvoo. He also received the entire Artjärvi parish as a fiefdom. After his military career, he acquired land in Blasieholmen, Stockholm, where he built a mansion.

== Sources ==
- Bentzer, Björn (2021), The Forbes Family in Sweden and Finland
- Bentzer, Björn (2019), Forbes and the Thirty Years War
- Lagercrantz, Bo, Scots in Sweden - Seventeenth Century - Part 1
- Hildebrand, Bengt (1964–1966), Arvid Forbus
