= Eksjö =

Place in Småland, Sweden

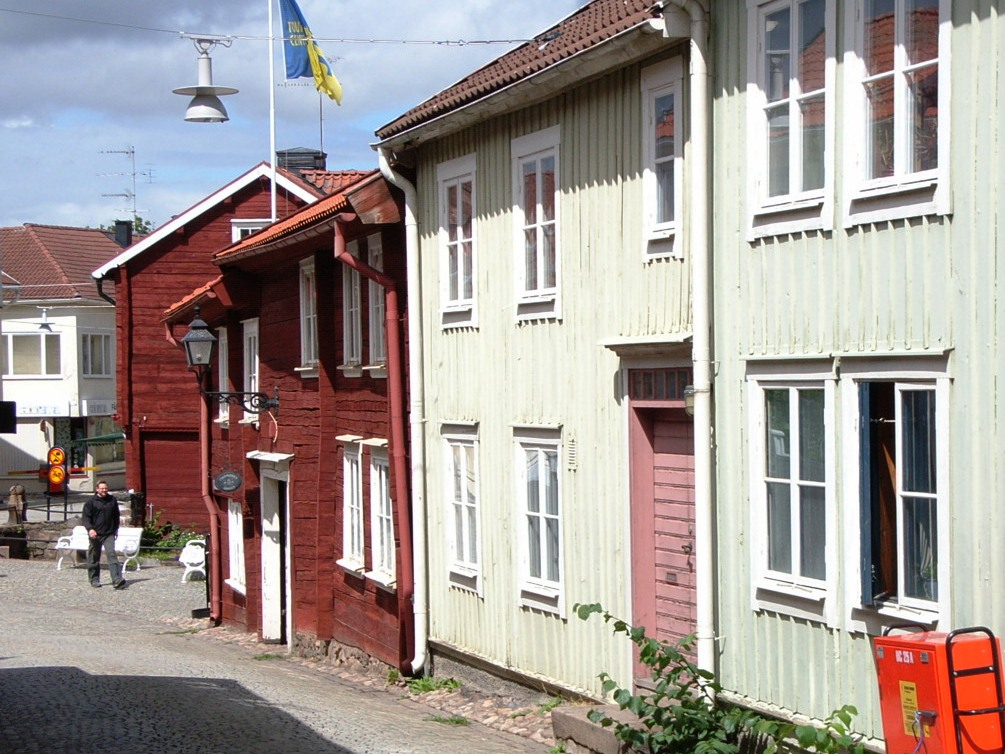
- Old Eksjö in July 2007

- Location within Jönköping Location within Sweden
- Coordinates: 57°40′01″N 14°58′13″E
- Country: Sweden
- Province: Småland
- County: Jönköping County
- Municipality: Eksjö Municipality
- Founded: 1403

Area
  - Total: 8.34 km^{2} (3.22 sq mi)
- Elevation: 215 m (705 ft)

Population (31 December 2010)
  - Total: 9,701
  - Density: 1,163/km^{2} (3,010/sq mi)
- Time zone: UTC+1 (CET)
  - Summer (DST): UTC+2 (CEST)
- Postal code: 575 xx
- Area code: (+46) 38
- Climate: Dfb
- Website: Official website

Eksjö is a locality and the seat of Eksjö Municipality in Jönköping County, Sweden, with 9,701 inhabitants in 2010.

== History ==
The city of Eksjö most likely appeared sometime in the Middle Ages when it was the centre for the thing, a regional council. It is first mentioned on April 22, 1345, under the name "Ekesiö" in an estate sale court protocol. It was given its charter in 1403 by the King Erik av Pommern.

In the 16th century Eksjö was one of the six Swedish cities in the province of Småland. The others were Jönköping, Kalmar, Västervik, Växjö and Vimmerby.

After the crowning of King Gustav Vasa in 1524, the partisan leader Nils Dacke led a rebellion. Dacke took control of the area and was supported by the locals, also in Eksjö. After Dacke had been killed by the Royal army, his body parts were hung in public places, including in Eksjö, to quench any notions of new uprising.

This may also have contributed to the decision of Gustav Vasa to revoke the city charter of Eksjö in 1544. There are several monuments and folk museums honouring these times around the province and in Eksjö municipality, and in the dense Smålandian forests where Dacke lived.

In August 2015, a fire occurred in Old Eksjö.

=== Relocation ===
During the Northern Seven Years' War Rantzau's army that had been pillaging Östergötland reached Eksjö after successfully avoiding Swedish enclosure attempts by crossing lake Sommen that had recently frozen. As Rantzau arrived Eksjö was burnt to the ground in 1568 and subsequently rebuilt at a somewhat different location. The construction was led by the Dutchman Arendt de Roy.

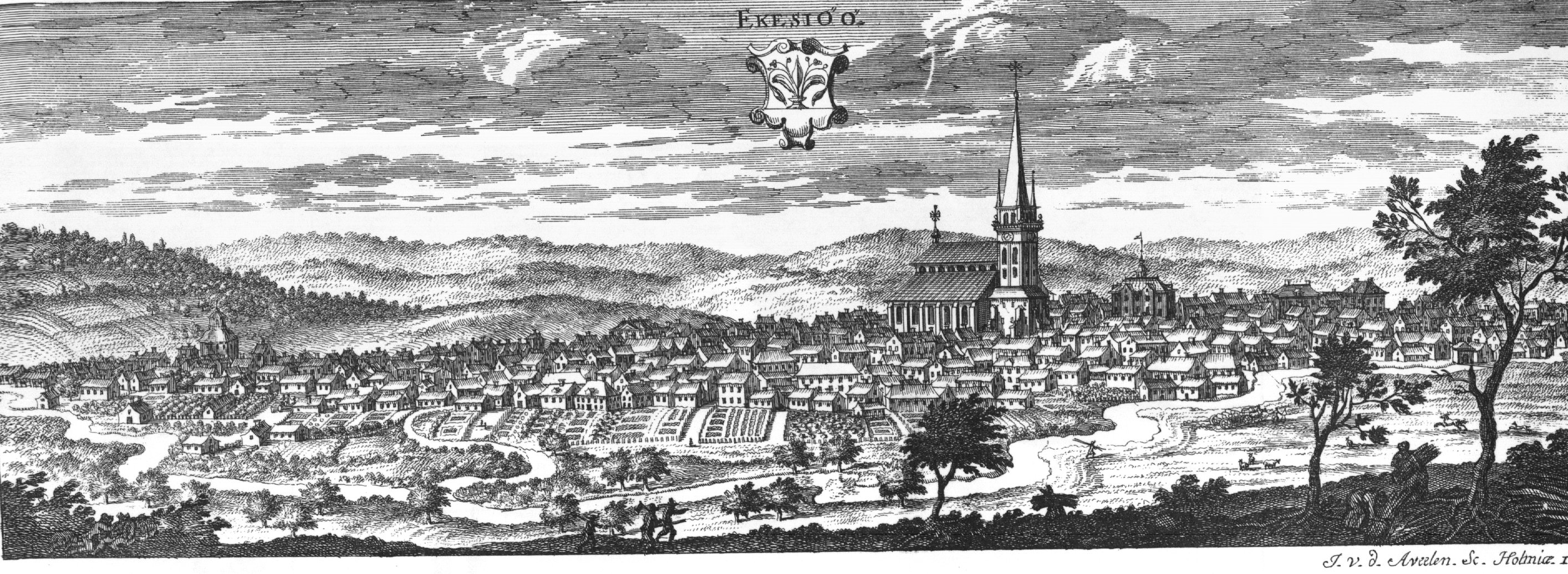
Eksjö, circa 1700, in Suecia Antiqua et Hodierna

== Development ==
The city emerged as a centre for the oxen trades but never really prospered and remained a small town until a heath outside the town became the point of assembly for the Småland Regiment. The city continued to be in the centre of military establishments, with the coming of the engineering battalion and the Husars of Småland, in southern Sweden, hence the lack of large industrial establishments.

== Notable People from Eksjö ==
- Erik Brännström, ice hockey player for the Ottawa Senators
- Niklas Hjalmarsson, former professional ice hockey defenceman for the Chicago Blackhawks, three-time Stanley Cup champion
- Richard Hansson, Fredrik Lennartsson, and Christopher Wallerstedt of the melodic death metal band Orbit Culture
- Reverend F. M. Johnson of the Swedish Mission Covenant Church in Chicago, Illinois
- Gunnar Lindstrom, Javelin thrower & agricultural consultant

== Sights ==
Like many other Swedish cities, Eksjö was struck by fire in the 19th century, with half of the city burning down in 1856. But the northern part of the original wooden city remained intact, with some buildings dating back to the reconstruction of the city in 1568. 56 buildings are registered historic landmarks. A fire in August 2015 that killed one person destroyed some 17th-century buildings.

== International relations ==
=== Twin towns — Sister cities ===
Eksjö is twinned with:

- Barlinek, Poland
- Schneverdingen, Germany
- Neusäß, Germany
- Ærøskøbing, Denmark
