= William Edmonds (colonel) =

Scottish Colonel in the Dutch States Army

William Edmonds (died 1606) was a Scottish-born army officer in the Dutch States Army.

Edmonds, born at Stirling, was the son of a baker. While still a boy he ran away from home for an unknown reason and found his way to the Low Countries, where he enlisted as a common soldier under Maurice, Prince of Orange. He was commissioned as a captain on 10 June 1589, and was promoted on 11 June 1599 as colonel commanding the first Scottish infantry regiment in the Netherlands. He returned briefly to Scotland from late July to October 1606 – it was probably about this time that he was knighted – before returning to the Low Countries with 800 new recruits. He died of head wounds received on 3 September 1606 during the defence of Rheinberg.

He was a friend of the Earl of Mar.

He was succeeded in the Dutch service by his son, Thomas Edmond. One of his daughters married Sir Thomas Livingstone; their eldest son was created Viscount Teviot by William III in 1698. On his death in 1711 the peerage became extinct.
