= David Drummond (soldier) =

Herr David Drummond
- David Drummond
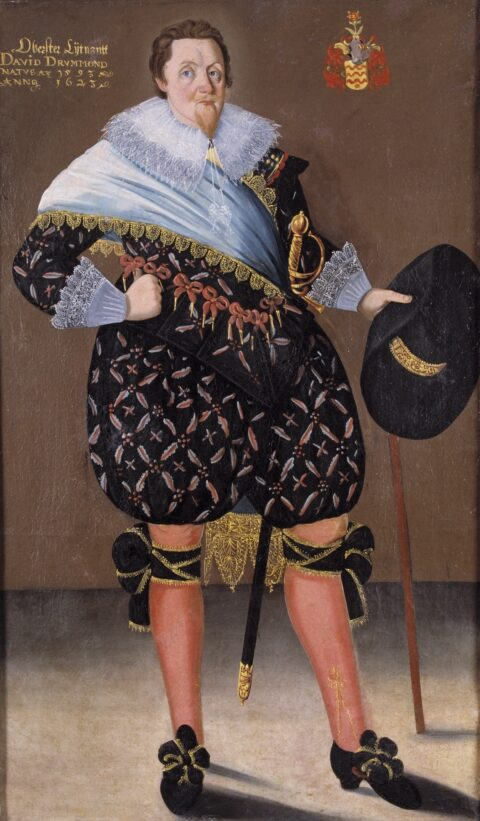
- David Drummond, portrait by Georg Günther Kräill von Bemeberg
- Born: 1593; Belliclone, Perthshire, Kingdom of Scotland
- Died: 1638 (aged 44–45); Spandau, Electorate of Brandenburg
- Burial place: Riddarholm Church, Stockholm, Sweden
- Military career
- Allegiance: Sweden
- Branch: Foot
- Service years: 1617–1638
- Rank: Colonel, Major-General
- Commands: Kalmar Regiment
- Conflicts: Polish–Swedish Wars 1621–1625 and 1626–1629: Siege of Riga, 1621; Thirty Years' War: Capture of Gartz, 1637
- Awards: Knighthood, enfeoffment

David Drummond (1593–1638), was a Scottish soldier who became a Swedish major-general, colonel and knight. He participated in the Polish–Swedish Wars 1621–1625 and 1625–1629 during which he rose from captain to colonel of Kalmar Regiment and was knighted in 1627. During the Thirty Years' War Drummond also became colonel of a German foot regiment in 1632 and major-general in 1634. He died of his wounds as a Prussian prisoner of war in 1638.

== Polish–Swedish War, 1621–1629 ==
Drummond, who was trained abroad, served as a lieutenant in the Swedish Life Guards in 1617. He participated in the siege of Riga in 1621, as a captain in the Östgöta field regiment, and in the fall campaign in Courland the same year. At the beginning of 1622 he was transferred to Johan Baner's newly formed field regiment, which was part of the army under Gustavus Adolphus which operated against Mitau. At the armistice shortly afterwards, the regiment returned to Östergötland. When Patrick Ruthven's field regiment was transferred to Livonia in 1625, Drummond became its lieutenant-colonel and commanded in Ruthven's absence. In the fall, Drummond's regiment was transferred to Gustaf Horn's army. In January 1626 the regiment was stationed in Kokenhusen. During the 1627 campaign, Drummond was commandant of Pillau. Infectious diseases ravaged the garrison, and before the end of the year Drummond was back in Kalmar to reestablish his regiment's combat capability. The drafting of new men took place under the auspices of Count John Casimir, and faced many difficulties; the Count had to transfer men drafted from Konga Hundred outside of Drummond's regimental area to his regiment. In the summer of 1628, Drummond's regiment was transported to Elbing; the regiment was then deployed with four companies in garrison at Marienburg and four at Dirschau.

== Swedish intervention in the Thirty Years' War ==
The Polish War ended with the truce of Altmark in 1629, and Drummond's regiment, which he now commanded as colonel, was eventually sent back to Sweden. Drummond became commandant of Kalmar and reorganized his regiment in connection with new discharges, whereby parts of Ruthven's former regiment were incorporated with his own. As commandant in Kalmar, Drummond was usually well informed and sometimes forwarded correspondence between the King and Count John Casimir. When Gustavus Adolphus entered the Thirty Years' War in 1630, Drummond and his regiment remained in Kalmar, due to King's mistrust of Danish intentions. At the beginning of the fall 1630 his men were sent home to their farmsteads. It was not until May 1631 that Kalmar Regiment was transferred to Pomerania. In a letter to the King of June 2, Drummond expressed his desire to accompany the main army during the mobile operations, but this did not happen. Instead, Drummond and his regiments was stationed in Stettin until the middle of 1634. He was said to be a stern but fair commander, and maintained strict discipline.

At the end of 1631, Drummond was ordered to raise a foot regiment through volunteer enlistment in Germany. It was an order which caused him great difficulties, but he seems to have had the regiment fully organized in the fall of 1632. When Johan Banér became field marshal in 1634, Drummond was commissioned major general of foot in his army, and participated during the end of the year with distinction in his campaigns. In June, Drummond forced the fortress of Krossen to surrender.

== Pomeranian War ==
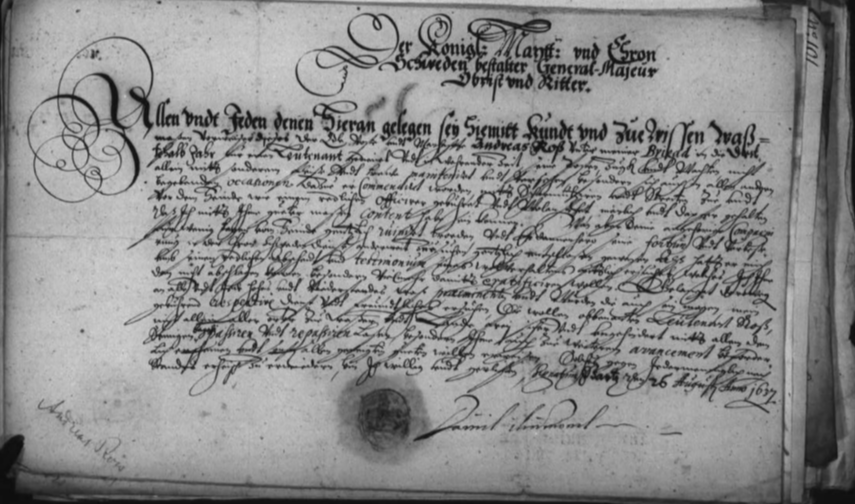
Letter in German, signed by David Drummond as Swedish major-general, colonel and knight.

During the troubling year of 1635, Drummond was for a time commander in Erfurt, where he had to suffer much from the attacks of the Saxons, and reported in Egeln personally to Banér about the actions of William, Duke of Saxe-Weimar. Towards the end of 1635, he seems to have been placed in Stettin again. Early in 1636, Drummond took part in Baner's and Herman Wrangel's defense of Pomerania against the Imperial Army of Matthias Gallas. Drummond complained in a letter to the Chancellor Axel Oxenstierna of his poor finances. Under Wrangel, Drummond participated with distinction in the conquest of Gartz in 1637, and subsequently became its commandant. When the city was taken by surprise by Brandenburg–Prussian troops in 1638, Drummond was wounded and captured. He was first taken to Kustrin. Drummond's last letter to Oxenstierna, dated Spandau 12 March 1638, is appended a report on the fall of Gartz. As a new colonel of the Kalmar regiment was appointed on 24 May, Drummond must have died before then.

== Personal life ==
Drummond was born in Scotland in 1593, the son of David Drummond of Belliclone and Margaret Graham of Arbenie. Drummond's grandfather was the second son of William, Master of Drummond, and the first of the house of Belliclone.

He was married to Baroness Cecilia Spens, daughter of James (Jacob) Spens, Swedish friherre Spens and Agnes Durie. The marriage had no issue. In 1627 he was knighted together with Patrick Ruthven and Alexander Leslie. Drummond was in 1631 enfeoffed with the manor of Slevringe in Åtvids Parish, that he had held as an official residence since 1619. After his death it was held by his widow through a letter patent of 1639. His widow managed to bring his body home in 1643, and had it buried in the Riddarholm Church. After her death in 1645 Slevringe was forfeited to the Crown.
