= Mesmes =

Mesmes may refer to:

- Mesmes language

== People ==
- Claude de Mesmes, comte d'Avaux
- Jean-Antoine de Mesmes (diplomat)
- Jean-Antoine de Mesmes (premier président)
- Jean-Jacques de Mesmes

== See also ==
- Mesme (disambiguation)
- Saint-Mesmes
