= Jean-Jacques de Mesmes =

French magistrate (1630–1688)

- Comte d'Avaux
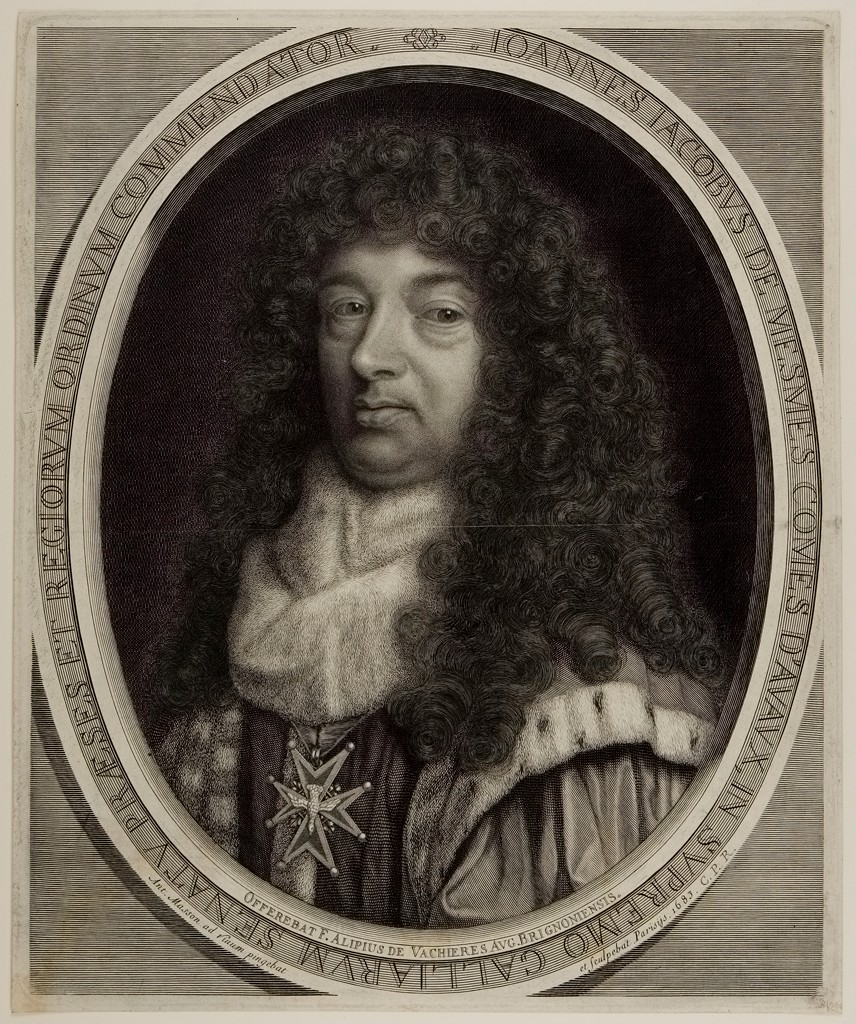
- Tenure: 1673–1688
- Predecessor: Jean-Antoine de Mesmes
- Successor: Jean-Antoine de Mesmes
- Born: c. 1630
- Died: 9 January 1688; Paris
- Spouse: Marguerite Bertrand de la Bazinière
- Issue Detail: Jean-Antoine, Henri, & others
- Occupation: Président à mortier

Jean-Jacques de Mesmes, comte d'Avaux, vicomte de Neufchâtel (1630–1688) was a French magistrate, intendant of Soissons, and Président à mortier of the Parlement of Paris. He developed the town of Avaux-la-Ville, which is now called Asfeld. He was a member of the Académie française. He was brother of Jean-Antoine de Mesmes, the diplomat, and father of Jean-Antoine de Mesmes, the premier president of the Parlement of Paris.

== Birth and origins ==
Family tree

Jean-Jacques de Mesmes with wife, parents, and other selected relatives. (Note: Also see the lists of siblings and children in the text.)

Jean- Jacques; 1560–1642	Antoinette de Grossaine
Henri; 1585–1650; President	Claude; 1595–1650; Diplomat	Jean- Antoine; 1598–1673; President	Anne; Courtin; 1610–1671
Jean- Jacques; 1630–1688; President	Marguerite; B de la Bazinière	Henri d. 1658; Cmd. Abbot	Claude d. 1671; Knt. of Malta	Jean- Antoine; 1640–1709; Diplomat
Jean- Antoine; 1661–1723; 1er President	Henri; 1666–1721; Cmd. Abbot	Marie- Thérèse b. 1668	Jean- Jacques; 1675–1741; Knt. of Malta
Guy; Nicholas de Durfort de Lorges; 1683–1758	Marie- Anne- Antoinette m. 1720	Henriette- Antoinette m. 1715

Legend

XXX	Subject of the article	XXX	Comtes d'Avaux

Jean-Jacques was born in 1630, or there about, probably in Paris. He was the eldest of the four sons of Jean-Antoine de Mesmes and his wife Anne Courtin. His birth year is sometimes given as 1640, (Note: This error is notably found in Dezobry & Bachelet) which cannot be as it is well established that his youngest brother was born that year.

His father was comte d'Avaux and a president at the Parlement of Paris. His mother was a daughter of Francois Courtin, seigneur de Brusselles and baron de Givry.

Jean-Jacques listed among his brothers
He heads the list of brothers as the eldest:
1. Jean-Jacques (1630–1688)
2. Henri (died 1658), became commendatory abbot of the abbeys of Valroy and Hambye (Note: Henri was the 36th abbot of Hambye)
3. Claude (died 1671), became a knight of St John (or Malta)
4. Jean-Antoine (1640–1709), became a famous diplomat like his uncle Claude

Jean-Jacques also had a sister, Antoinette, who became a Carmelite nun

Jean-Jacques de Mesmes, the president, the subject of this article, may easily be confused with other members of his family who share the same name, notably his grandfather Jean-Jacques de Mesmes, sieur de Roissy (died 1642) and his youngest son Jean-Jacques de Mesmes, knight of Malta (died 1741).

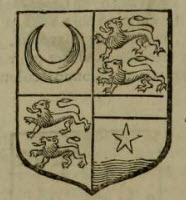
His coat of arms (Note: The arms precede the corresponding text.)

== Noble titles ==
On 23 February 1673 Jean-Jacques de Mesmes became the fourth comte d'Avaux at his father's death. (Note: As his eldest son was the fifth count and followed him directly, Jean-Jacques was the fourth.) The Latin inscription on the portrait by Antoine Masson in 1683 calls him 'Comes d'Avaux. (Note: The Latin inscription on the oval frame reads: JOHANNES JACOBUS DE MESMES COMES D'AVAUX IN SVPREMO GALLIARUM SENATU PRÆSES ET REGIORUM ORDINUM COMMENDATOR (Jean Jacques de Mesmes, comte d'Avaux, president in the parlement, and commander in the kings' order). On the inner oval frame we can read Offerebat F. Alipius Vachieres Aug Brignoniensis. On the outer rim of the oval frame at the bottom we can read Ant. Masson ad verum pingebat et sculpebat Parisis 1683 CPR [cum privilegio regis].) This is important because his youngest brother, Jean-Antoine, the diplomat, also claimed to be comte d'Avaux. Using a regnal number in the Parisian branch of the de Mesmes family, he is called Jean-Jacques III de Mesmes. (Note: Jean-Jacques II de Mesmes (1560–1642) was his paternal grand father. Jean-Jacques I de Mesmes (1490–1569) served King Francis I of France.)

He was also vicomte de Neufchâtel, and seigneur de Cramayel. The title of vicomte de Neufchâtel was used as a courtesy title by his eldest son, Jean-Antoine, while Jean-Jacques was still alive.

== Avaux-la-Ville ==
In 1671 Jean-Jacques de Mesmes enlarged his estate at Avaux en Champagne by buying the neighbouring fief of Écry. He then developed the village of Écry to a small town and renamed it Avaux-la-Ville, while Avaux became Avaux-le-Château. This new town is today known as Asfeld after Claude Francois Bidal d'Asfeld, who bought the county of Avaux in 1728.

With the village came the old castle of Écry or Escry, which he extended and transformed. In 1683 Jean-Jacques de Mesmes asked the architect François Romain to build a new church in Avaux-la-Ville. An Italian baroque style and an unusual design were adopted. The church's footprint is said to have the form of a viola da gamba. It has a pentagonal dome. The church is dedicated to Saint-Didier. Due to the change of name from Avaux-la-Ville to Asfeld, it is now known as Saint Didier's Church, Asfeld.

== Career ==
Jean-Jacques de Mesmes pursued a judicial and administrative career. He became conseiller au parlement, maître des requêtes, et conseiller d'état. In 1672 he was given his father's place as président à mortier at the parlement of Paris. He also became intendant of Soissons. It is often said that he participated in the signing of the Treaties of Nijmegen but this seems to be due to a confusion with his brother Jean-Antoine, the diplomat.

=== Order of the Holy Spirit ===
On 20 September 1671 Jean-Jacques de Mesmes became Provost and Master of Ceremonies of the Ordre des Chevaliers du Saint-Esprit. He obtained this office from Macé de Bertrand de la Bazinière (1632–1688), his father-in-law.

His portrait, painted and engraved by Antoine Masson in 1683, shows Jean-Jacques de Mesmes in the robes of a président à mortier with the cross of the Order of the Holy Spirit on its cordon bleu around his neck. On 17 February 1684 he resigned from this office and sold it to his younger brother Jean-Antoine, the diplomat.

=== Académie française ===
He was a learned man and had travelled to Italy. He owned a large library, for which he engaged Lucas Holstenius as librarian. In 1676 he was elected to the Académie française, becoming the second occupant of Seat 4. He was elected due to his reputation and the influence of his family. He was no famous writer of French literature. His inauguration speech was his only work ever to be printed. His son Jean-Antoine would also be an academician (elected in 1710).

== Marriage and children ==
On 8 March 1660 Jean-Jacques married Marguerite Bertrand de la Bazinière, daughter of Macé Bertrand de la Bazinière (1632–1688), trésorier de l'Épargne.

Jean-Jacques and Marguerite had five children: three sons and two daughters:

1. Jean-Antoine (1661–1723), succeeded him as comte d'Avaux and became first president of the Parlement of Paris
2. Henri (1666–1721), became commendatory abbot of the abbeys of Valroy and Hambye (Note: Henri was the 38th abbot of Hambye)
3. Marie-Thérèse (born 1668), married François de la Roche, marquis de Fontenille
4. Judith-Amasie (born 1672), became a nun
5. Jean-Jacques (1675–1741), became a Knight of St John

== Death, succession, and timeline ==
Jean-Jacques died in Paris on 9 January 1688 and was buried at the Grands Augustins.

At his death his heirs made a plan how to keep his office as président à mortier in the family. This particular post at the parlement de Paris had been in the de Mesmes family since his paternal uncle Henri had obtained it and had passed from Henri to his youngest paternal uncle Jean-Antoine and then to him. It would be best if it could be passed to his son Jean-Antoine, but this son had just been named conseiller au parlement and still needed to become maître de requêtes before he could become président à mortier. They then wondered whether his youngest brother Jean-Antoine, the diplomat, could hold this office until his son was ready for it. His son Jean-Antoine was nevertheless promoted to président à mortier without ever having been a maître de recherches.

At his death the heirs sold the townhouse built by Claude de Mesmes's in the Marais Quarter of Paris to Paul de Beauvilliers, Duke of Saint-Aignan. It thus became known as the Hôtel Beauvilliers and later the Hôtel de Saint-Aignan.

Timeline
As his birth date is uncertain, so are all his ages.
Age	Date	Event
0	1630, about	Born.
12–13	1643, 14 May	Death of Louis XIII; Regency until the majority of Louis XIV
20–21	1651, 3 Sep	Majority of Louis XIV, end of his mother’s regency.
29–30	1660, 8 Mar	Married Marguerite Bertrand de la Bazinière:
40–41	1671, 20 Sep	Became provost and master of ceremonies of the Order of the Holy Spirit.
41–42	1672	Became président à mortier.
42–43	1673, 23 Feb	Succeeded his father as comte d'Avaux.
45–46	1676, 23 Dec	Elected to the Académie française.
53–54	1684, 17 Feb	Sold his office as provost and master of ceremonies of the Order of the Holy Spirit to Jean-Antoine de Mesmes
57–58	1688, 9 Jan	Died, leaving 3 sons and 2 daughters.

== Notes and references ==
=== Sources ===
- Anselme, Père (1733). Histoire généalogique et chronologique de la maison royale de France (in French). Vol. Tome neuvième (Troisième édition ed.). Paris: Compagnie des libraires associez. OCLC 831196155. – Knights of the Order of the Holy Spirit and general index
- Boulliot, Jean Baptiste Joseph (1830). Biographie ardennaise (in French). Vol. Tome premier. Paris: Chez l'éditeur, rue de l'Arbre sec. OCLC 239338707.
- Dangeau, Philippe de Courcillon, marquis de (1854). Conches, Feuillet de (ed.). Journal du marquis de Dangeau (in French). Vol. Tome Deuxième. Paris: Firmin Didot Frères. OCLC 310446765. – 1687 to 1689
- Dezobry, Charles; Bachelet, Théodore (1869). Dictionnaire général de biographie et d'histoire de mythologie de géographie ancienne et moderne (in French). Vol. Deuxième partie (Cinquième edition revue ed.). Paris: Delagrave. OCLC 1040551952. – K to Z
- Goubert, Pierre (1984). Initiation à l'histoire de la France [Initiation to the History of France] (in French). Paris: Fayard-Tallandier. ISBN 978-2-235-01484-7. – (for timeline) – (for timeline)
- Le Conte, René (1891). Curiositez Normandes comparées. Études historiques et archéologiques sur les abbayes de bénédictins en général et sur celle de Hambye en particulier (in French). Bernay: Miaulle-Duval. OCLC 1028980788.
- Moréri, Louis (1759). Le grand dictionnaire historique ou le mélange curieux de l'histoire sacrée et profane (PDF) (in French). Vol. Tome septième. Paris: Pierre Augustin Le Mercier. OCLC 1070379896. – M to N
- Olivet, Pierre-Joseph Thoulier d' (1730). Histoire de l'Académie françoise depuis 1652 jusqu'à 1700 (in French). Paris: Jean-Baptiste Coignard. OCLC 634653169.
- Saint-Simon, Louis de Rouvroy, duc de (1895). Boislisle, Arthur de (ed.). Mémoires du duc de Saint-Simon (in French). Vol. Tome onzième. Paris: Hachette. OCLC 1068033585. – 1703
