= Claude de Mesmes, comte d'Avaux =

French diplomat (1595–1650)

Claude de Mesmes
- comte d'Avaux
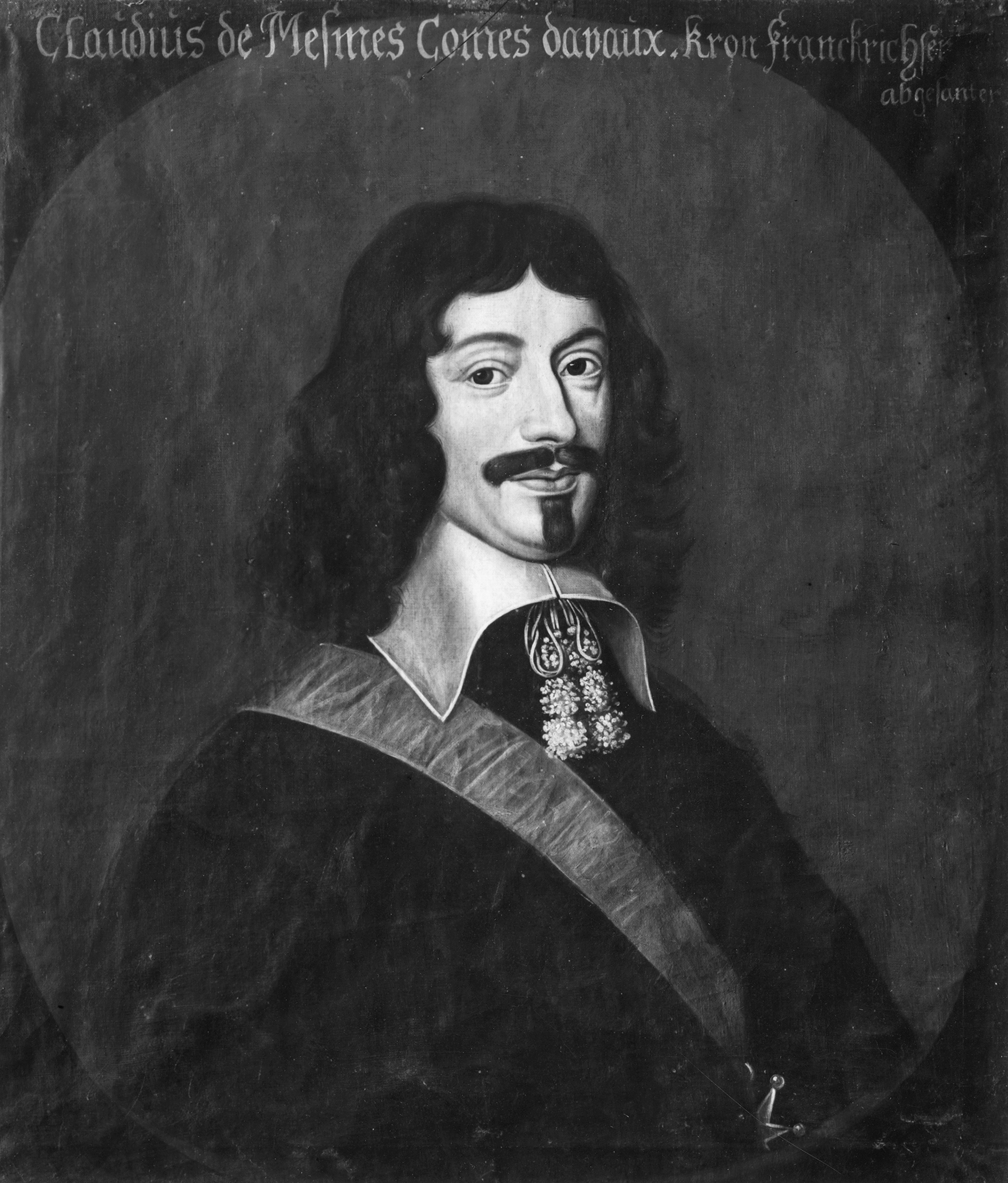
- Tenure: 1642–1650
- Predecessor: Jean-Jacques de Mesmes, comte d'Avaux
- Successor: Jean-Antoine de Mesmes, comte d'Avaux
- Born: 1595
- Died: 19 November 1650 (aged 54–55)
- Father: Jean-Jacques II de Mesmes
- Mother: Antoinette de Grossaine
- Occupation: Diplomat, Superintendent of Finances

Claude de Mesmes, comte d'Avaux (French pronunciation: [klod də mɛm kɔ̃t davo]; 1595–1650) was a 17th-century French diplomat and public administrator. He was sent in various missions to Venice, Rome, Germany, Sweden, Denmark, and Poland by Richelieu.

In 1635 he guided the negotiations of the Treaty of Stuhmsdorf, which extended the truce between Poland and Sweden. These two countries had fought each other in the Polish-Swedish war of 1626–1629, which had ended in a truce rather than a peace. France wanted peace between Poland and Sweden as the Swedes were fighting for France in Germany and the Poles would have menaced their flank.

In 1638 he negotiated a new alliance between France and Sweden in the Treaty of Hamburg. He also was plenipotentiary at the Peace of Westphalia and ended his career as Superintendent of Finances.

== Birth and origins ==
Claude was born in 1595 as one of five children, three sons and two daughters, of Jean-Jacques de Mesmes and his wife Antoinette de Grossaine. His father was knight and seigneur de Roissy, numbered Jean-Jacques II de Mesmes in the Paris branch of the family. His mother was a rich heiress, who had brought her husband the seigneuries of Avaux, Irval, Breuil, Besancourt, Bellefontaine, and Vandeuil.

Family tree

Claude de Mesmes with his parents and other selected relatives. He never married. (Note: Also see the list of siblings in the text.)

Henri; 1532–1590 | Jeanne; Hennequin
Jean- Jacques; 1560–1642 | Antoinette de Grossaine
Henri; 1585–1650; President | Claude; 1595–1650 | Jean- Antoine; 1598–1673; President | Anne; Courtin
Jean- Jacques; 1630–1688; President | Henri d. 1658 cmd. Abbot | Claude d. 1671; Knt. of Malta | Jean- Antoine; 1640–1709; Diplomat
Jean- Antoine; 1661–1723; 1er President | Henri; 1666–1721; Cmd. Abbot | Marie- Thérèse b. 1668 | Jean- Jacques; 1675–1741; Knt. of Malta

| Legend |

| XXX | Subject of the article | XXX | Comtes d'Avaux |

He appears below among his brothers as the second son:

1. Henri (1585–1650), who was numbered Henri II de Mesmes and became président à mortier at the parlement of Paris
2. Claude (1595–1650)
3. Jean-Antoine (1598–1673), who inherited Henri's office of président à mortier and was the only one of the brothers that fathered sons

His sisters were Jeanne and Judith:

1. Jeanne, who married François Lambert d'Herbigny
2. Judith, who married Antoine Maximilien de Belleforière

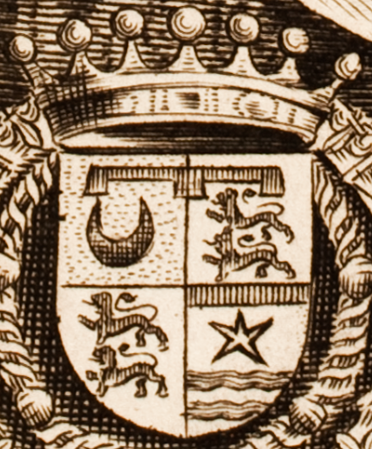
The coat of arms of the comtes d'Avaux, detail from the portrait by Anselm van Hulle (Note: The background of the fourth quarter should have been stippled, indicating Or, according to the heraldic convention.) (Note: The coat of arms has been "blazoned" (described) by Pattou, Lainé, and La Chesnaye des Bois. The blazonings by Lainé and La Chesnaye des Bois are both marred by a few obvious errors, which are corrected in the blazoning by Pattou.)

== Judicial and administrative career ==
He followed his elder brother Henri by starting a career at the parlement of Paris. He became maître des requêtes and then, in 1623, conseiller d'état.

== Comte d'Avaux ==
In January 1638 Louis XIII raised the seigneurie of Avaux to a comté for him and his father. However, the act was only registered in 1648. Strictly speaking, Claude de Mesmes therefore became comte d'Avaux only late in his life, in 1648, whereas his father never became count as he died in 1642, well before the registration date. However, Claude de Mesmes used the title immediately in 1638 for his negotiations in Hamburg. Surely that was what the king intended. In the French version of the Treaty of Hamburg, he writes Nous, Claude de Mesmes, Comte d'Avaux, Conseiller d'Etat, whereas in the Treaty of Stuhmdorf of 1635, he still was only Dominus de Avaux (Seigneur d'Avaux).

Claude de Mesmes was the second comte d'Avaux according to the numbering found in Boulliot, so his father seems to have been accepted and counted as the first comte d'Avaux.

His portrait by Anselm van Hulle is adorned with his coat of arms. The escutcheon is surmounted by the coronet of a French count. By error, as it seems, the coronet has seven rather than the usual nine balls. The escutcheon is quartered. First quarter: Or crescent sable (for Mesmes). Second and third quarter: argent two lions passant gules (for Bigorre). Fourth quarter: Or, chief gules, base azure waved, charge mullet sable (for Lassus in Guyenne). A red label with three pendants appears on the head of the escutcheon. This label would have been needed before his father's death, in 1642, to indicate that he was a cadet and his father was the count. However, the date on the engraving is 1648. This seems another error.

== Order of the Holy Spirit ==
On 5 April 1637 Claude de Mesmes became greffier (secretary) of the Order of the Holy Spirit. This office allowed him to wear the cordon bleu, which is the blue sash shown on his portraits. The offices of this order are often passed on in families, but Claude de Mesmes (now d'Avaux) sold his in 1643 to Noël de Bullion, sieur de Bonnelles.

== Father's death and partition ==
His father decided to share his possessions between his three sons. At the father's death, in 1642, Henri inherited Roissy, the traditional main seat of the family and the family's townhouse in Paris. Claude, our subject here, inherited Avaux and with it the title of comte d'Avaux. Jean-Antoine, the youngest brother, inherited Irval and probably Vandeuil, which is the village next to Irval Castle.

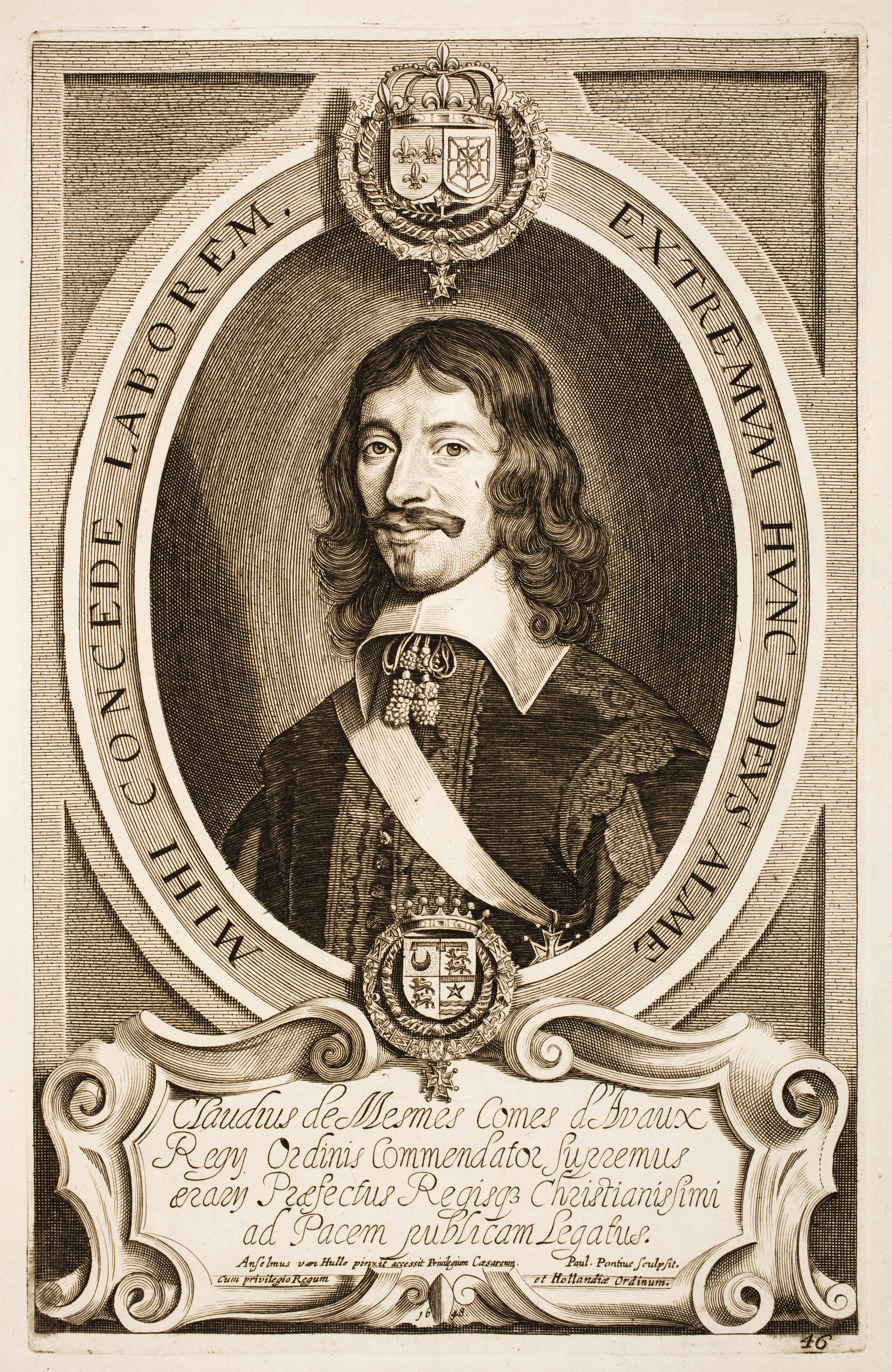
Claude de Mesmes painted by Anselm van Hulle and engraved by Paulus Pontius in 1648. Note the cordon bleu, worn as a sash over the right shoulder, and the cross of the Order of the Holy Spirit. (Note: The Latin motto running around the oval frame of the portrait reads: Extremum hunc deus alme mihi concede laborem (Kindly grant me, god, this last work). This is an adaptation of the first sentence of Virgil's 10th Eclogue, which reads Extremum hunc Arethusa mihi concede laborem. The text in the cartouche beneath the portrait reads Claudius de Mesmes Comes d'Avaux Regii Ordinis Commendator Supremus aerarii Praefectus Regisque Christianissimi ad Pacem publicam Legatus (Claude de Mesmes, comte d' Avaux, officer of the royal order, superintendent of finances, and ambassador of the most christian king to the public peace).)

== Diplomatic career ==
As diplomat Claude de Mesmes first served under Cardinal Richelieu, the first minister of Louis XIII, and then under Cardinal Mazarin, who took over as first minister from Richelieu in 1642. He was sent to Italy and then into northern Europe: Poland, Denmark and Sweden. Finally, he participated in the negotiations for the Peace of Westphalia.

=== Italy ===
Claude de Mesmes's first major post was French ambassador to Venice, where he arrived in 1627, just one year before the outbreak of the War of the Mantuan Succession (1628–1631), which was triggered by the death of Vincenzo II, the last male of the Mantuan Gonzaga line. Several candidates contended the succession. The emperor supported Charles Emmanuel I, Duke of Savoy, whereas France and Venice supported Charles Gonzaga, duc de Nevers. In 1629 an Imperial army beleaguered and took Mantua, but the troops were soon recalled to Germany to fight in the Thirty Years' War (1618–1648). France therefore prevailed and the duc de Nevers acceded to the ducal throne of Mantua.

Claude de Mesmes did not hesitate to spend money to enhance the prestige of France and his king: in October 1628 he celebrated the capture of La Rochelle by feasts and firework in Venice.

After Venice he was sent to Rome, Mantua, Florence and Turin.

=== Treaty of Stuhmsdorf ===
During the later phase of the Thirty Years' War, France was allied with Sweden. Richelieu feared that the Polish menace on their left flank would distract the Swedes from fighting the emperor in Germany. The Polish-Swedish war of 1626–1629 had ended with the truce signed at Altmark after the Swedish defeat at Honigfelde. This truce was to expire in July 1635 and the new Polish king, Władysław IV Vasa, seemed poised to resume the war.

To ensure a timely renewal of the truce, Richelieu sent Claude de Mesmes to Poland as a mediator. The French delegation left Paris on 11 July 1634. Claude de Mesmes was accompanied among others by his secretary Charles Ogier, who kept a diary. Avoiding war-torn Germany, the delegation travelled via Denmark and Sweden. On the way Claude de Mesmes stopped in Copenhagen in 1634 to represent France at the wedding of crown prince Christian with Magdalene Sibylle of Saxony. While in Copenhagen they received the news of the Swedish defeat at Nördlingen on 27 August (old style), which further weakened Sweden's position. From Denmark the delegation travelled to Sweden where they passed the winter and met officials in Stockholm. They arrived in Dantzig (now Gdańsk) on 17 May 1635 and proceeded to Marienburg (now Malbork) where they took up quarters in the castle.

The French delegation arrived late. The negotiations had started on 24 January in the church of the small town of Holland (now Pasłęk) in Ducal Prussia. (Note: The Duchy of Prussia was at that time ruled by George William, Elector of Brandenburg in personal union being Margrave of Brandenburg in the Empire and Duke of Prussia in Poland) The Brandenburger delegation, which was mediating, stayed in that town. The Polish delegation (in fact the one representing the Polish–Lithuanian Commonwealth) stayed at Mohrungen (now Morąg). Brandenburg was represented by Siegmund of Brandenburg, Andreas von Kreytzen, and Peter Bergmann. Siegmund of Brandenburg was a cousin of the ruling elector George William. The Polish delegation was led by the great chancellor of the crown Jakub Zadzik. The magnate Rafał Leszczyński also was part of the Polish delegation. He wanted peace but mainly for religious reasons as he was a Calvinist. The Swedish delegation stayed in Elbing (now Elbląg), 30 km to the north-west, which was the seat of the Swedish authorities in Prussia. It was led by Count Brahe. The English delegation arrived some weeks late and participated in the talks from the 5th of February on. It was led by Sir George Douglas of Mordington (died 1636), who was assisted by Francis Gordon (died 1643), the English agent at Dantzig. The negotiations at Holland soon stalled.

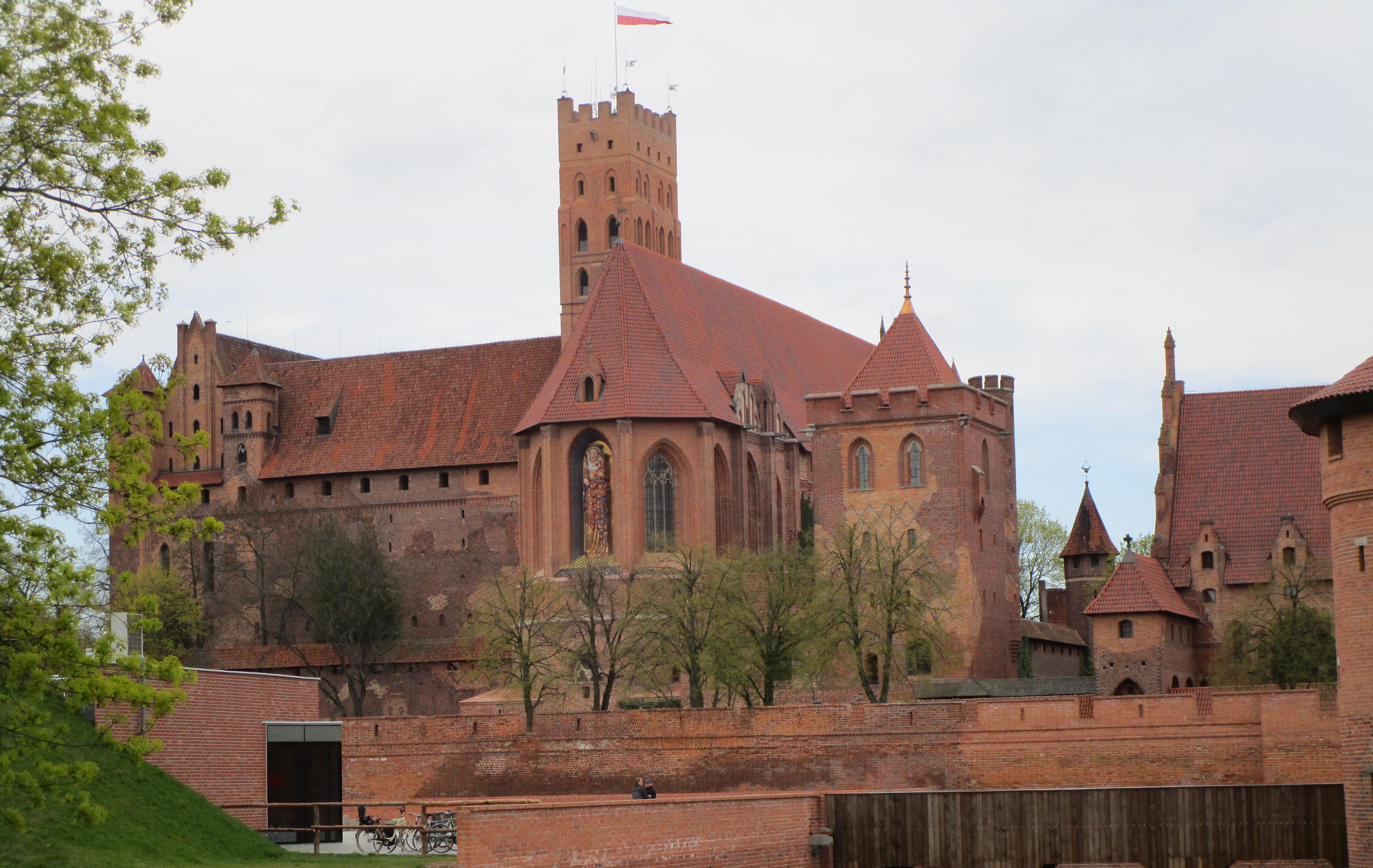
Marienburg Castle where d'Avaux stayed during the negotiations for the Treaty of Stuhmsdorf.

However, King Władysław asked Douglas and Bergmann to make another attempt in which the French delegation participated. The negotiations restarted on 28 May at Stuhmsdorf (now Sztumska Wieś). The delegations moved to new quarters. The Polish delegation moved to Marienwerder (now Kwidzyn), where they stayed in the castle. The Swedish delegation moved to Jonasdorf (also called Johannsdorf and now Janówka) to the north-east of Marienburg. The mediators stayed in Marienburg Castle. Stuhmsdorf was chosen as the meeting-place because it was about equidistant between Marienwerder and Jonasdorf. The negotiations led to the signing of the Treaty of Stuhmsdorf on 2 September 1635 (old style).

=== Renewals of the alliance with Sweden ===
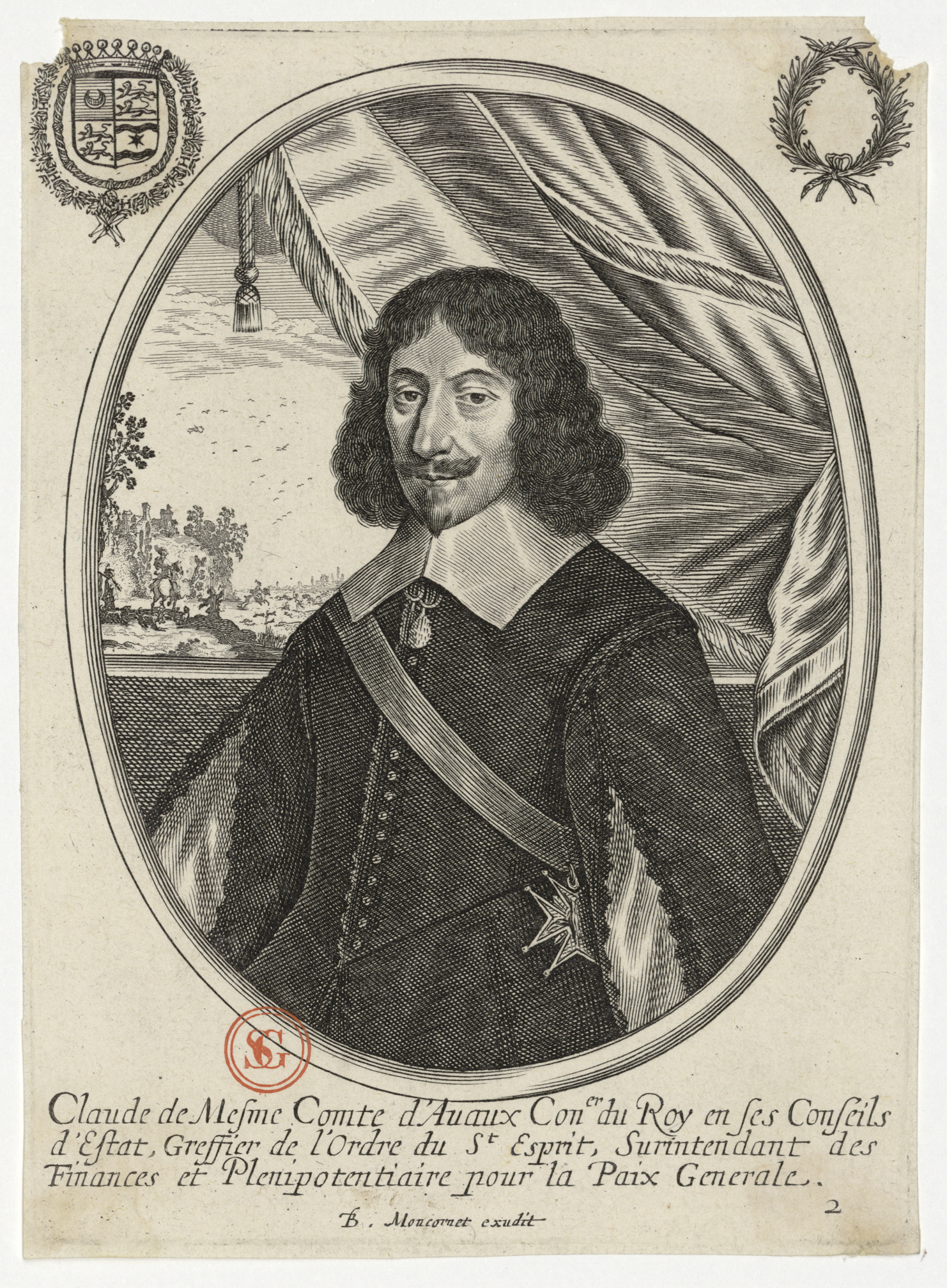
Portrait by Balthasar Moncornet

France supported Sweden almost right from the beginning of the Swedish intervention in the Thirty Years' War, which started in earnest with Gustavus Adolphus's invasion of Pomerania in 1630. In the Treaty of Bärwalde in 1631 France promised a subvention of 1,000,000 livres (400,000 Riksdaler) per year to the Swedish army.

Richelieu sent d'Avaux (as he was called now) to Hamburg in 1638 to negotiate a new alliance with Johan Adler Salvius, sent by Queen Christina. The negotiations led to the Treaty of Hamburg, signed on 15 March 1638, an extension of the alliance between France and Sweden for three year. This alliance was again renewed in 1641.

=== Peace of Westphalia ===
In 1642 Richelieu died and Mazarin took over as chief minister. D'Avaux's relationship with Mazarin was difficult as he was considered part of the previous administration. In 1643 he was sent to Germany to take part in the lengthy negotiations that eventually led to the Peace of Westphalia, which ended the Thirty Years' War. In 1644 the official negotiations started in Münster where the Catholic delegations resided. The French delegation was led by the duc de Longueville, and comprised Anne-Geneviève de Bourbon-Condé, the leader's wife, d'Avaux, and Abel Servien. D'Avaux, who was more conciliatory, repeatedly clashed with Abel Servien, who was more demanding and had been dubbed "l'ange exterminateur de la paix" (the peace-killing angel) by the negotiators. D'Avaux was finally excluded from the negotiations.

== Townhouse ==
Between 1644 and 1650 d'Avaux built himself a new stylish townhouse in the Marais quarter of Paris. It was designed by Pierre Le Muet. The present address is 71 rue du Temple, but in his time this plot was in rue Sainte-Avoye. This mansion stayed in the family until 1688, when it was sold to Paul de Beauvilliers, the future 2nd duc of St Aignan for 153,000 livres. It therefore became known as the Hôtel de Saint-Aignan. This house must not be confused with the Hôtel de Mesmes, which stood almost opposite to it on the other side of the same street. His elder brother Henri lived in the Hôtel de Mesmes.

== Later life, death, and timeline ==
Although the dispute with Servien damaged his reputation, d'Avaux ended his career as a member of the high Council of the Realm and superintendent of finances (1649–1650). His nephew Jean-Antoine (died 1709) was to follow in his footsteps and become the other famous diplomat of the family.

D'Avaux died on 19 November 1650. He had never married. At his death, the title and most of the lands passed to Jean-Antoine (Jean-Antoine I de Mesmes), his younger brother, because Henri, his elder brother, had died some months before him, also in 1650, and left no male heir. (Note: Indeed Henri's only son Jean-Jacques, born in 1643, had predeceased him at a young age.) Jean-Antoine also inherited his elder brother Henri's charge as président à mortier of the Parlement of Paris.

Timeline
| Age | Date | Event |
|---|---|---|
| 0 | 1595 | Born the second son of Jean-Jacques de Mesmes. |
| 27–28 | 1623, 7 Aug | Sworn in as Conseiller d'État. |
| 31–32 | 1627 | Appointed ambassador to Venice. |
| 32–33 | 1628, Oct | Celebrated the capture of La Rochelle in Venice. |
| 39–40 | 1635, 2 Sep | Signed the Treaty of Stuhmsdorf (old-style date). |
| 41–42 | 1637, 5 April | Became greffier of the Order of the Holy Spirit. |
| 42–43 | 1638, Jan | Father created comte d'Avaux by Louis XIII. |
| 42–43 | 1638, 15 Mar | Signed the Treaty of Hamburg. |
| 46–47 | 1642, Oct | Succeeded his father (Jean-Jacques II de Mesmes) as comte d'Avaux. |
| 46–47 | 1642, 4 Dec | Richelieu died. |
| 47–48 | 1643, 14 May | Death of Louis XIII; Regency until the majority of Louis XIV |
| 47–48 | 1643 | Sold his charge as greffier of the Order of the Holy Spirit. |
| 48–49 | 1644 | Started to build a townhouse in Paris, now called the Hôtel de Saint-Aignan. |
| 52–53 | 1648, 4 Aug | The erection of the seigneury of Avaux to a comté was finally registered. |
| 53–54 | 1649 | Appointed superintendent of finances. |
| 54–55 | 1650, summer | Elder brother (Henri II de Mesmes) died. |
| 54–55 | 1650, 19 Nov | Died having never married |

== Notes and references ==
=== Sources ===
- Anselme, Père (1733). Histoire généalogique et chronologique de la maison royale de France [Genealogical and Chronological History of the Royal House of France] (in French). Vol. Tome neuvième (Troisième édition ed.). Paris: Compagnie des libraires associez. OCLC 831196155. – Knights of the Order of the Holy Spirit and general index
- Bain, Robert Nisbet (1908). Slavonic Europe: a political history of Poland and Russia from 1447 to 1796. Cambridge: Cambridge University Press. OCLC 458587359.
- Bain, Robert Nisbet (1910). "Brahe, Per" . In Chisholm, Hugh (ed.). Encyclopædia Britannica. Vol. 4 (11th ed.). Cambridge University Press. p. 377.
- Boppe, Auguste (1887). Correspondance inédite du comte d'Avaux (Claude de Mesmes) avec son père [Unpublished Correspondence of the Count Avaux (Claude de Mesmes) with his Father] (in French). Paris: E Plon, Nourrit et Cie. OCLC 4456492.
- Boulliot, Jean Baptiste Joseph (1830). Biographie ardennaise [Biography of the Ardennes] (in French). Vol. Tome premier. Paris: Chez l'éditeur, rue de l'Arbre sec. OCLC 239338707.
- Dezobry, Charles; Bachelet, Théodore (1869). Dictionnaire général de biographie et d'histoire [General Dictionary of Biography and History] (in French). Vol. Première partie (Cinquième edition revue ed.). Paris: Delagrave. OCLC 1040554696. – A to J (for Avaux)
- Dumont, Jean (1728). Corps universel diplomatique du droit des gens, contenant un recueil des traités d'alliance, de paix, de trêve &c., faits en Europe, depuis le règne de l'empéreur Charlemagne jusqu'à présent (in French and Latin). Vol. VI Partie I. Amsterdam: P. Brunel. OCLC 1042473068. – 1631 to 1666
- Fowler, John (1656). "The History of the Troubles of Suethland and Poland which Occasioned the Expulsion of Sigismundus the Third, King of those Kingdomes with his Heirs forever from the Suethish Crown with a Continuation of those Troubles, untill [sic] the Truce, An. 1629. As also, a Particular Narration of the daily Passages at the last and great Treaty of Pacification between those two kingdomes, concluded at Stumbsdorff in Prussia, Anno 1635". Książnica Zamojska - Księgozbiór Rodziny Zamoyskich. London: Thomas Dring. OCLC 559253950.
- Geijer, Erik Gustaf (1832). Geschichte Schwedens [History of Sweden] (in German). Vol. Dritter Band. Hamburg: Friedrich Perthes. OCLC 495062389.
- Goubert, Pierre (1984). Initiation à l'histoire de la France [Initiation to the History of France] (in French). Paris: Fayard-Tallandier. ISBN 978-2-235-01484-7.
- La Chesnaye des Bois, François Alexandre Aubert de (1863). Dictionnaire de la noblesse [Dictionary of Nobility] (in French). Vol. Tome deuxième (3rd ed.). Paris: Schlesinger Frères. OCLC 797014713. – AUD to BER (for Avaux & Belleforière)
- La Chesnaye des Bois, François Alexandre Aubert de (1868). Dictionnaire de la noblesse [Dictionary of Nobility] (in French). Vol. Tpme treizième (3rd ed.). Paris: Schlesinger Frères. OCLC 797014713. – MAL to MON (for Mesmes)
- Lainé, Louis (1819). Dictionnaire véridique des origines des maisons nobles ou anoblis du royaume de France (in French). Vol. Tome second. Paris: Chez l'auteur, rue de la Vrillière. – F to Z
- Le Moel, Michel (1977). "L'Hôtel de Saint-Aignan à Paris". Cahiers de Saint-Simon (in French). 5 (5): 76. doi:10.3406/simon.
- Moréri, Louis (1759). Le grand dictionnaire historique ou le mélange curieux de l'histoire sacrée et profane (PDF) (in French). Vol. Tome septième. Paris: Pierre Augustin Le Mercier. OCLC 1070379896. – M to N
- Ogier, Charles (1656). Caroli Ogierii ephemeridae, sive iter danicum, svecicum, polonicum [The Diary of Charles Ogier: Or the Danish, Swedish and Polish Travels] (in Latin). Paris: Le Petit. OCLC 4172685.
- Pauli, Karl Friedrich (1763). Allgemeine Preußische Staatsgeschichte [General History of the Prussian State] (in German). Vol. Vierter Band. Halle: Christoph Peter Franckens. OCLC 697605462.
- Piganiol de La Force, Jean-Aymar (1765). Description historique de la Ville de Paris et de ses environs (in French). Vol. Tome quatrième (Nouvelle ed.). Paris: Librairies Associées. OCLC 832565452.
- Pulaski, François; Tomkiewicz, Ladislas (1937). La mission de Claude de Mesmes comte d'Avaux ambassadeur extraordinaire en Pologne 1634-1636 [The Mission of Claude de Mesmes, Extraordinary Ambassador to Poland 1634-1636] (in French). Paris: Bibliothèque Polonaise. OCLC 247489204.
- Richelieu, Jean Armand du Plessis (1823). Mémoires du cardinal de Richelieu [Memoirs of the Cardinal of Richelieu] (in French). Vol. X. Paris: Foucault. OCLC 15353519.
- Saint-Simon, Louis de Rouvroy, duc de (1895). Boislisle, Arthur de (ed.). Mémoires du duc de Saint-Simon [Memoirs of the Duke of Saint-Simon] (in French). Vol. Tome onzième. Paris: Hachette. OCLC 1068033585. – 1703
- Saint-Simon, Louis de Rouvroy, duc de (1910). Boislisle, Arthur de (ed.). Mémoires du duc de Saint-Simon [Memoirs of the Duke of Saint-Simon] (in French). Vol. Tome vingt et deuxième. Paris: Hachette. OCLC 1068033585. – 1711 to 1712
- Tellier, Luc-Normand (1987). Face aux Colbert : les le Tellier, Vauban, Turgot ... et l'avènement du libéralisme [Facing the Colberts : The Telliers, Vaubans, Turgots ... and the advent of liberalism] (in French). Sillery: Presses de l'Université du Québec. ISBN 2-7605-0461-1.
- Wicquefort, Abraham de (1745). Histoire des Provinces Unies [History of the United Provinces] (in French). Vol. Tome second. La Haye: T Johnson. OCLC 1048301463.
