= Jean-Antoine de Mesmes (diplomat) =

French diplomat (1640–1709)

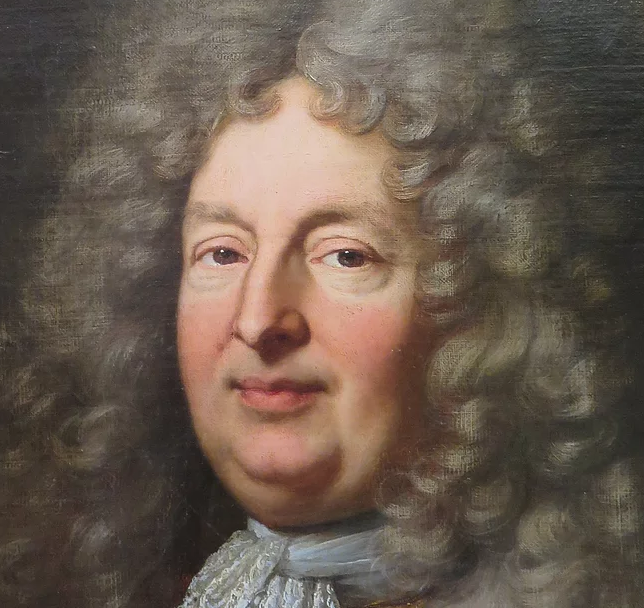
- Portrait by Hyacinthe Rigaud (detail). (Note: This portrait has been identified and documented at the occasion of its sale at Galartis in Lausanne in 2016 by Ariane James-Sarazin and Stéphan Perreau.)
- Born: 1640
- Died: 10/11 February 1709; Paris
- Other names: D'Avaux, pretending he was count
- Occupation: Diplomat

Jean-Antoine de Mesmes, called d'Avaux (1640–1709), was a French diplomat in the service of Louis XIV. He is probably best known for accompanying King James II of England in his Irish expedition. He also negotiated for France the Peace of Nijmegen, which ended the Franco-Dutch War (1672–1678). He was French ambassador in Venice, The Hague, Stockholm and finally The Hague again.

== Birth and origins ==
Jean-Antoine was born in 1639 or 1640 (Note: D'Avaux's birth year (i.e. 1640) is based on his obituary, which states that he died on 10 February 1709 at the age of 69 years. He could of course have been born any time between 10 February 1639 and 9 February 1640.) He was the youngest of the four sons of Jean-Antoine de Mesmes and his wife Anne Courtin. His father was Comte d'Avaux and a president at the Parlement of Paris. His paternal uncle Claude was a well known diplomat. Jean-Antoine's mother was the daughter of François Courtin, seigneur de Brusselles and baron de Givry.

Jean-Antoine listed among his brothers
He appears at the bottom of the list of brothers below as the youngest:
1. Jean-Jacques de Mesmes (1630–1688), became president at the Paris Parlement and succeeded his father as comte d'Avaux
2. Henri (died 1658), became commendatory abbot of the abbeys of Valroy and Hambye (Note: Henri was the 36th abbot of Hambiye)
3. Claude (died 1671), became a knight of St John (or Malta)
4. Jean-Antoine (1640–1709)

Jean-Antoine's sisters
He also had a sister:
- Antoinette, who became a Carmelite nun

Jean-Antoine de Mesmes, the diplomat, the subject of this article, may easily be confused with other members of his family who shared the same name, notably his father Jean-Antoine de Mesmes, comte d'Avaux (died 1673) and his nephew Jean-Antoine de Mesmes (premier président), premier president of the Paris Parlement and comte d'Avaux (died 1723).

Family tree

Jean-Antoine de Mesmes with parents and other selected relatives. (Note: Also see the list of siblings in the text.) He never married.

Jean- Jacques; 1560–1642	Antoinette de Grossaine
Henri; 1585–1650; President	Claude; 1595–1650; Diplomat	Jean- Antoine; 1598–1673; President	Anne; Courtin; 1610–1671
Jean- Jacques; 1630–1688; President	Henri d. 1658 cmd. Abbot	Claude d. 1671; Knight of Malta	Jean- Antoine; 1640–1709
Jean- Antoine; 1661–1723; 1er President	Henri; 1666–1721 cmd. Abbot	Marie- Thérèse b. 1668	Jean- Jacques; 1675–1741; Knight of Malta

Legend

XXX	Subject of the article	XXX	Comtes d'Avaux

== Comte d'Avaux ==
Jean-Antoine de Mesmes, the diplomat, was never a count. That title passed from his father (died 1673) to his eldest brother, Jean-Jacques, who died in 1688, and then to Jean-Jacques's eldest son, who died in 1723 and outlived the diplomat (see family tree). However, he liked to pass himself off as "comte d'Avaux" when abroad on his embassies to better his precedence. Saint Simon remarks upon this habit in his memoirs. He appears as "comte d'Avaux" in many texts, among others his obituary in the Gazette de France, Louis Moréri's historical dictionary, and, besides, a modern academic study. He signed "De avaux". His eldest brother did not approve but may not have cared that much because he preferred his title of president over that of count.

== Order of the Holy Spirit ==
In 1684 he became Provost and Master of Ceremonies of the Order of the Holy Spirit, which is the highest order of chivalry in France. However, membership and offices could be inherited and bought. He obtained his office from his eldest brother, Jean-Jacques, probably against payment. In 1703, he sold the office to his nephew, also called Jean-Antoine, but kept the right to wear the cordon bleu.

His office at the Order of the Holy Spirit allowed him to wear the attributes of the order: the cordon bleu (blue ribbon), the "plaque" (cross to be worn on the breast) and the smaller cross attached to the cordon bleu. The broad blue ribbon and the breast cross are clearly visible on his portrait by Hyacinthe Rigaud.

== Judicial career ==
Jean-Antoine followed in the steps of his father by starting a career in the judiciary. In 1661, he became Conseiller au Parlement; in 1667, Maître des requêtes; and finally, much later, in 1695, Conseiller d'État ordinaire.

== Diplomatic career ==
His diplomatic career fell entirely into the reign of Louis XIV, who ruled France from the death of Cardinal Mazarin in 1661 to 1715. He served under three secretaries of state for foreign affairs: first under Simon Arnauld, marquis de Pomponne until 1679, then under Charles Colbert, Marquis de Croissy until 1696, and finally under Charles's son Jean Baptiste Colbert, Marquis of Torcy, until the end of Louis XIV's reign. Croissy was a younger brother of the great Colbert.

=== Ambassador in Venice (1672–1674) ===
In 1672 Louis XIV appointed him as his ambassador to the Republic of Venice. From the 15th to the 18th centuries, Venice repeatedly clashed with the Ottoman Empire in seven Ottoman-Venetian Wars, but his embassy fell into a period of peace between the end of the Cretan War (1669) and the beginning of the Morean War (1684). The French had intervened in the Cretan War during the Siege of Candia to gain favour with the pope for the Most Christian King, but the French expeditions ended in disaster, and France pulled out of the war, leading to the fall of Candia. The Venetians felt betrayed, and he needed to rebuild trust and understanding. He engaged in industrial espionage and facilitated the purchase of Italian works of art for the royal collections. He stayed at the post until 1674.

=== Peace of Nijmegen ===
From 1675 to 1678, he negotiated the treaty that ended the Franco-Dutch War (1672–1678). During the negotiations, he befriended Charles Colbert, Marquis de Croissy, a senior French diplomat and brother of Jean-Baptiste Colbert, Minister of Finance from 1661 to 1683. Colbert de Croissy was to become his superior as secretary of state for foreign affairs after the conclusion of the treaties in 1679.

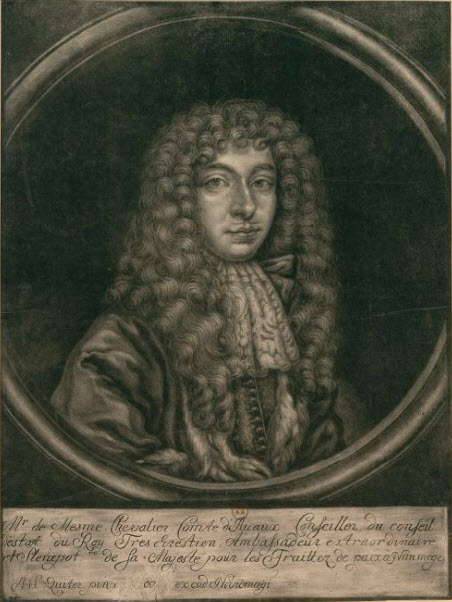
Portrait by Hardouin Quitter. The text reads: "Mr de Mesmes Chevalier Comte d'Avaux Conseiller du conseil d'estat du Roy Tres Chrestien, Ambassadeur extraordinaire et Plenepotre de Sa Majesté pour les Traittez de paix à Nimmegue"

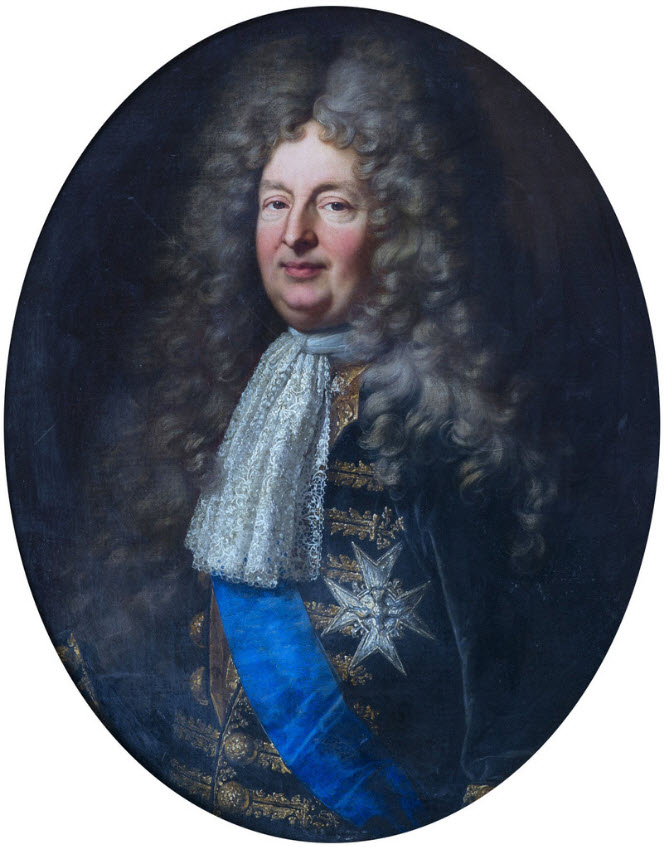
Portrait by Hyacinthe Rigaud. Note the cordon bleu and the breast cross of the Order of the Holy Spirit.

=== Ambassador at The Hague (1678–1689) ===
With the Peace of Nijmegen in 1678, France resumed diplomatic relations with the Dutch Republic, and Jean-Antoine de Mesmes was appointed ambassador at The Hague. He had been preceded by Pomponne before the interruption caused by the Franco-Dutch War. However, in 1683 and 1684, war came again near the Dutch Republic, as France besieged and took fortresses in the neighbouring Spanish Netherlands during the War of the Reunions. The Dutch did not intervene but felt menaced by the inroads made by the French towards their borders. The war ended with the Truce of Ratisbon, which consisted of several bilateral treaties including a treaty between France and the Dutch Republic as a preparation for the treaty between France and Spain. The French felt that appeasing the Dutch was as important as talking to the Spanish. Jean-Antoine de Mesmes, being ambassador at The Hague, was asked to negotiate the treaty between France and the Dutch Republic. In the treaty, France abandoned Dixmude (Diksmuide) and Courtrai (Kortrijk) but kept Luxembourg. Jean-Antoine de Mesmes signed it "de Mesmes, comte d'Avaux" on 29 June. The treaty between Louis XIV and Charles II of Spain was signed about 1½ months later on 15 August 1685 in Ratisbon (Regensburg), the seat of the German diet, by Louis de Verjus, comte de Crécy, the French ambassador to the diet.

In 1685, Louis XIV revoked the Edict of Nantes, which had guaranteed freedom of religion to French Protestants. The ensuing persecution sent waves of refugees, called the Huguenots, all over Northern Europe. The ambassador in 1686 reported the presence of 75,000 Huguenots in the Netherlands.

Jean-Antoine de Mesmes soon found out about William of Orange's plans to invade England and warned Louis XIV. On 9 September 1688, he handed over a letter from Louis XIV that threatened the Dutch Republic with war. On 5/15 November 1688 (Note: During the period covered in this article, England, Scotland and Ireland still used the Julian Calendar (i.e. Old Style), whereas France and the Netherlands had already adopted the Gregorian calendar (i.e. New Style). The difference was 10 days at the given time.) William landed in Brixham. France responded by declaring war on the Dutch Republic on 26 November, thereby breaking the Truce of Ratisbon and starting the Nine Years' War. Diplomatic relations between France and the Dutch Republic again were severed. Jean-Antoine de Mesmes was forced to leave his post in The Hague in 1689, after a stay of more than ten years.

=== Irish expedition (1689–1690) ===
In 1689 he was appointed ambassador extraordinary to James II for the Irish expedition. On 12/22 March 1689 he arrived with James II at Kinsale, on Ireland's southern coast, sailing with the King on the flagship, the Saint Michel. He reported to Louvois, with regard to military aspects but to Colbert de Croissy with regard to foreign affairs. He had been given 300,000 livres for James and a secret fund of 200,000 to spend as he wanted. He sat on James II's council, together with Tyrconnell and Melfort, James's secretary of state. For James and Melfort, Ireland was only a springboard to Scotland and England. Jean-Antoine de Mesmes, in contrary, insisted on the importance of consolidating their grip on Ireland. Whereas James and Melfort wanted to protect the Irish Protestants to keep possible support in Scotland and England, Tyrconnell and Jean-Antoine de Mesmes mistrusted the Protestants and wanted to satisfy the demands of the Irish Catholics for land and rights.

Jean-Antoine de Mesmes was finally dismissed and replaced with the comte Lauzun, who was favoured by James and his queen, Mary of Modena. At the very end of his mission, before embarking to return to France in April 1690, Jean-Antoine de Mesmes explained to his successor that "you are come to be a sacrifice for a poor, spirited and cowardly people whose soldiers will never fight and whose officiers will never obey orders, and therefore they would meet the same fate his Master's [i.e. Louis XIV's] army met with at the Siege of Candia, that is to be wasted and destroyed." He was referring to the disastrous French intervention in favour of the Venetian Republic at the Siege of Candia in 1669.

=== Ambassador in Stockholm (1692–1699) ===
In 1692, the French ambassador to Sweden, Maximilien Alpin de Béthune, died suddenly while he was posted in Stockholm. On 30 November 1692, Louis XIV appointed Jean-Antoine de Mesmes in his place. Sweden enjoyed a period of peace after the Scanian War (1675–1679), which had been mainly fought in southern Sweden. France was allied with Sweden while the Netherlands were allied with Denmark, which made the war a collateral of the Franco-Dutch War of 1672–1678.

When he became ambassador in Sweden, France was fighting England, the Dutch Republic, Spain and the Holy Roman Empire in the Nine Years' War, which was exhausting its finances. King Charles XI of Sweden (ruled 1675–1697) had wisely stayed neutral. France wanted to use Sweden, its former ally, to mediate between France and the Empire in the peace talks. The war eventually ended with the Treaty of Ryswick, concluded in September and November 1697 in the Netherlands. The Swedish diplomat Niels Baron of Lilliënrot mediated in the negotiations, and France was represented by Marshal Boufflers.

Colbert de Croissy died in 1696 and was replaced by his son Colbert de Torcy. Charles XI died in April 1697 and was succeeded by the young Charles XII.

Jean-Antoine de Mesmes recruited Beata Elisabet von Königsmarck as an agent for France to create an alliance between Sweden and Denmark through a marriage of Charles XII to Princess Sophia Hedwig of Denmark. The purpose was to prevent a repetition of the alliances in the Franco-Dutch and the Scanian Wars in which Denmark was allied with the Dutch Republic against France and Sweden. However, Charles XII never married. Jean-Antoine de Mesmes stayed in Sweden until summer 1699. In 1700, the Great Northern War broke out in which Denmark, Poland and Russia attacked Sweden.

According to Saint-Simon, the Swedes were disappointed when they discovered that the new French ambassador was only a nobleman of the robe, not of the sword.

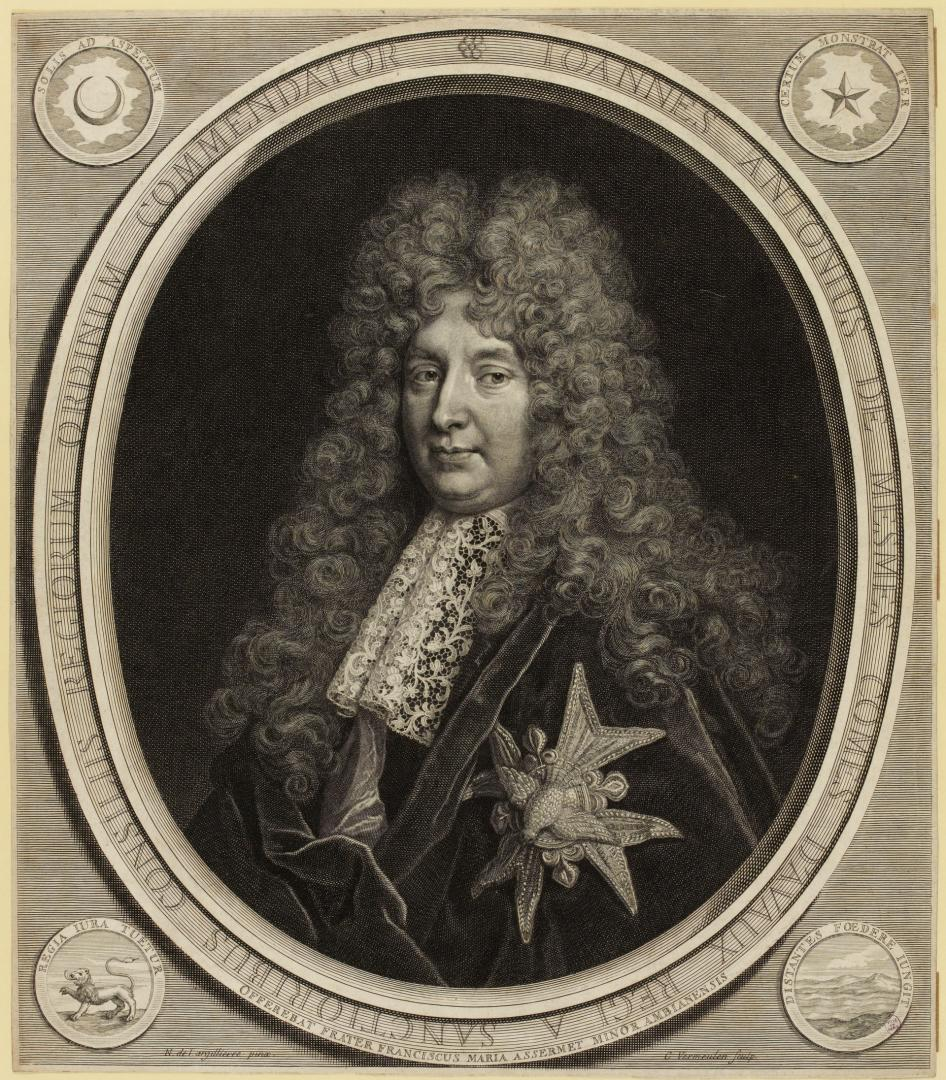
Portrait as member of the order of the Holy Spirit, painted by Nicolas de Largillière, engraved by Cornelis Vermeulen 1691

=== Standing in for Briord in the Hague (1701) ===
In 1701, Louis XIV sent Jean-Antoine de Mesmes to the Dutch Republic for the second time, to stand in for Ambassador Gabriel de Briord, who had fallen ill. Maréchal Boufflers occupied the Barrier Fortresses in the night of 5 to 6 February while Jean-Antoine de Mesmes was travelling from Paris to The Hague, where he arrived on 12 February. In April, Briord had recovered and returned to Paris. On 17 April, William recognised Philip V as King of Spain. Jean-Antoine de Mesmes rested until in August. Shortly afterwards, diplomatic relations are broken by the War of the Spanish Succession.

== Later years ==
In 1688, at his eldest brother's death, Jean-Antoine de Mesmes inherited the seigneury of Roissy. In 1704, at the age of 64, he decided to build himself a country residence at Roissy. He demolished the old manor and began a new chateau, consisting of a central mansion and two lateral pavilions around a courtyard. The château was near completion at his death.

He died in Paris on 10 February 1709 at the age of 69 years. He had never married. He bequeathed the chateau de Roissy to his niece Marie-Thérèse, marquise de Fontenilles, daughter of his eldest brother, Jean-Jacques. The castle was then bought by the marquise de la Carte in 1713 and by John Law in 1719. Later, it came into the possession of the Riquet de Caraman family after which it was called the Château des Caramans. It was demolished after a fire in 1794. Plans and elevations have been drawn and published by Georges-Louis Le Rouge. Archaeological excavations have been conducted in 2000.

Timeline
As the birth date is uncertain, so are the ages.
Age	Date	Event
0	1639 or 1640	Born.
20–21	1661	Conseiller au Parlement
26–27	1667	Maître des Requêtes
31–32	1672	Appointed French Ambassador in Venice
43–44	1684	Bought the office of Provost and Master of Ceremonies of the Order of the Holy Spirit
47–48	1688, 29 Jun	Signed the Truce of Ratisbon
48–49	1689, 12 Mar	Landed in Ireland with James II
49–50	1690, Apr	Replaced by comte Lauzun and returns to France
51–52	1692, Nov	Ambassador in Stockholm
54–55	1695, Aug	Conseiller d'État ordinaire
60–61	1701	Stood in for Briord, the Ambassador at the Hague
62–63	1703	Sold his office of Provost and Master of Ceremonies of the Order of the Holy Spirit
63–64	1704	Started building the Château de Roissy
68–69	1709, 10 Feb	Died

== Notes and references ==
=== Sources ===
- Anselme, Père (1733). Histoire généalogique et chronologique de la maison royale de France (in French). Vol. Tome neuvième (Troisième édition ed.). Paris: Compagnie des libraires associez. OCLC 831196155. – Knights of the Order of the Holy Spirit and general index
- Boulger, Demetrius Charles (1911). The Battle of the Boyne. London: Martin Secker. OCLC 1041056932.
- Childs, John (2007). The Williamite Wars in Ireland 1688–1691. London: Hambledon Continuum Press. ISBN 978-1-85285-573-4. – (Preview)
- Clément, Pierre (1867). "II". Lettres, instructions et mémoires de Colbert (in French). Vol. II. Paris: Imprimerie Impériale. OCLC 858730545. – This part of Volume 2 concerns industry and commerce.
- Depping, Georges Bernard (1855). Correspondance administrative sous le règne de Louis XIV (in French). Vol. 4. Paris: Imprimerie Nationale. OCLC 1042529784.
- Dangeau, Philippe de Courcillon, marquis de (1855). Conches, Feuillet de (ed.). Journal du marquis de Dangeau (in French). Vol. Tome Quatrième. Paris: Firmin Didot Frères. OCLC 310446765. – 1692 to 1694
- Dufour, Jean-Yves (November 2000). "Le château de Roissy: une enquête à mener". Archeopage (in French) (2): 16–21.
- Dufour, Jean-Yves (2014). Le château de Roissy-en-France, Val d'Oise: origine et développement d'une résidence seigneurale du pays de France, XII-XIXe siècle (in French). Vol. 2 supplement. Paris: Revue archéologique de l'Île de France. ISBN 978-2-7466-7171-3.
- Dumont, Jean (1731). Corps universel diplomatique du droit des gens, contenant un recueil des traités d'alliance, de paix, de trêve &c., faits en Europe, depuis le règne de l'empéreur Charlemagne jusqu'à présent (in French and Latin). Vol. VII Partie II. Amsterdam: P. Brunel. OCLC 1042473068. – 1680 to 1700
- Hogan, James (1934). Négociations de M. le comte d'Avaux en Irlande, 1689–90. Dublin: Stationery Office. OCLC 614257995.
- Jardine, Lisa (2008). Going Dutch: How England Plundered Holland's Glory. London: Harper Perennial. ISBN 978-0-00-719734-7.
- Joannon, Pierre (1993). "Jacques II et l'expédition d'Irlande d'après les dépêches du Comte d'Avaux, ambassadeur extraordinaire de Louis XIV". Études irlandaises (in French). 18 (2): 93–108. doi:10.3406/irlan.1993.2920.
- La Chesnaye des Bois, François Alexandre Aubert de (1770). Dictionnaire de la noblesse (in French). Vol. I (2nd ed.). Paris: Duchesne. OCLC 491609675. – ABA to BAR (for Avaux, cited in the older edition where the succession is clearer)
- Lavisse, Ernest (1911). "I". Histoire de la France illustrée depuis les origines jusqu'à la révolution (in French). Vol. VIII. Paris: Hachette. OCLC 1917029.
- Lebeuf, Jean (1883) [1st pub. 1754]. Histoire de la ville et de tout le diocèse de Paris (in French). Vol. Tome deuxième. Paris: Féchoz et Letouzey. OCLC 7074049.
- Legrelle, Arsène (1892). La diplomatie française et la succession d'Espagne (in French). Vol. IV. Gand: F-L. Dullé-Plus. OCLC 1181684565.
- Le Conte, René (1891). Curiositez Normandes comparées. Études historiques et archéologiques sur les abbayes de bénédictins en général et sur celle de Hambye en particulier (in French). Bernay: Miaulle-Duval. OCLC 1028980788.
- Le Rouge, Georges-Louis (1776). "Jardins Anglo-Chinois 3e Cahier". Traité des édifices, meubles, habits, machines et ustensiles des Chinois (in French). Paris: Le Rouge. OCLC 7002766.
- Moréri, Louis (1759). Le grand dictionnaire historique ou le mélange curieux de l'histoire sacrée et profane (PDF) (in French). Vol. Tome septième. Paris: Pierre Augustin Le Mercier. OCLC 1070379896. – M to N
- Piganiol de La Force, Jean-Aymar (1765). Description historique de la Ville de Paris et de ses environs (in French). Vol. Tome neuvième (Nouvelle ed.). Paris: Librairies Associées. OCLC 1121283745.
- Saint-Simon, Louis de Rouvroy, duc de (1891). Boislisle, Arthur de (ed.). Mémoires du duc de Saint-Simon (in French). Vol. Tome huitième. Paris: Hachette. OCLC 1068033585. – 1701
- Saint-Simon, Louis de Rouvroy, duc de (1895). Boislisle, Arthur de (ed.). Mémoires du duc de Saint-Simon (in French). Vol. Tome onzième. Paris: Hachette. OCLC 1068033585. – 1703
- Saint-Simon, Louis de Rouvroy, duc de (1903). Boislisle, Arthur de (ed.). Mémoires du duc de Saint-Simon (in French). Vol. Tome dix-septième. Paris: Hachette. OCLC 1068033585. – 1709
- Saint-Simon, Louis de Rouvroy, duc de (1857). The Memoirs of the Duke of Saint Simon of the Reign of Louis XIV, and the Regency. from the French Abridged. Vol. II. Translated by St. John, Bayle. London: Chapman & Hall. OCLC 503829696. – First series in two volumes
- Wauchope, Piers (2004). "Mesmes, Jean-Antoine de, Count Avaux in the French nobility (1640–1709)". In Matthew, Colin; Harrison, Brian (eds.). Oxford Dictionary of National Biography. Vol. 37. New York: Oxford University Press. pp. 938–939. ISBN 0-19-861387-3.
- Wijnne, J. A. (1882). Négociations de monsieur le comte d'Avaux ambassadeur extraordinaire à la cour de Suède (in French). Vol. Tome premier. Utrecht: Kemink & fils.

Diplomatic posts
Preceded by François de Neufville, duc de Villeroy	French ambassador in Venice; 1672–1674	Succeeded by Jean-François d'Estrades
Preceded by Simon Arnauld, marquis de Pomponne	French ambassador in the Netherlands; 1678–1689	Succeeded by François d'Usson de Bonrepaus
Preceded by Jean-Paul de Barillon	French ambassador to England; 1689–1690	Succeeded by Antoine Nompar de Caumont
Preceded by Maximilien Alpin de Béthune	French ambassador in Sweden; 1692–1699	Succeeded by Louis de Guiscard
Preceded by Gabriel de Briord	French ambassador in the Netherlands; 1701	Succeeded by Pierre-Antoine de Châteauneuf
