= Jean-Antoine de Mesmes =

Jean-Antoine de Mesmes may refer to:

- Jean-Antoine de Mesmes (diplomat) (1640–1709), French diplomat, also known as comte d'Avaux;
- Jean-Antoine de Mesmes (premier président) (1661–1723), premier président of the Paris parlement.
