= Misme =

Misme may refer to:

- Misme (mythology), mother of Ascalabus
- Jane Misme (1865–1935), French journalist and feminist
- Ronald Rey Quispe Misme, a Bolivian race-walker
- Whitney Misme, a competitor in El Gran Show (season 3)
- Mis-me', a historic village of the Chilula tribe

== See also ==
- Clotilde Brière-Misme
- Mesme
- MISME Syndrome
