= Avaux =

- Commune
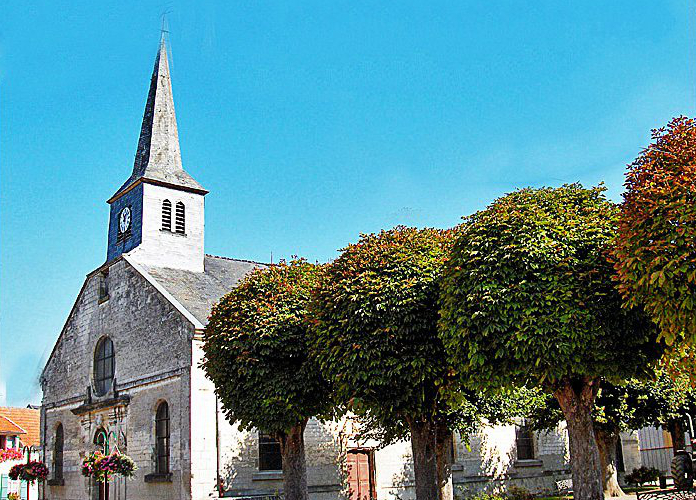
- the Church of Notre-Dame

- Coat of arms
- Location of Avaux
- Location within France Location within Grand Est
- Coordinates: 49°27′24″N 4°05′03″E
- Country: France
- Region: Grand Est
- Department: Ardennes
- Arrondissement: Rethel
- Canton: Château-Porcien
- Intercommunality: CC Pays Rethélois

Government
  - Mayor (2020–2026): Didier Marby
- Area^{1}: 13.19 km^{2} (5.09 sq mi)
- Elevation: 60 m (200 ft)
- Highest elevation: 130 m (430 ft)
- Lowest elevation: 57 m (187 ft)
- Population (2023): 520
  - Density: 39/km^{2} (100/sq mi)
- Time zone: UTC+01:00 (CET)
  - Summer (DST): UTC+02:00 (CEST)
- INSEE/Postal code: 08039 /08190
- ^{1} French Land Register data, which excludes lakes, ponds, glaciers > 1 km^{2} (0.386 sq mi or 247 acres) and river estuaries.

Avaux (French pronunciation: [avo]) is a commune in the Ardennes department and Grand Est region of north-eastern France.

The commune has been awarded two flowers by the National Council of Towns and Villages in Bloom in the Competition of cities and villages in Bloom.

== Geography ==
Avaux is located some 22 km west by south-west of Rethel and 38 km south-east of Laon. Access to the commune is by the D523 from Évergnicourt in the south-west which changes to the D137 at the border then continues to the village and north-east to join the D18 south-west of Saint-Germainmont. The D966 forms the western border of the commune as it goes south from Lor to Evergnicourt. Apart from thin strips of forest along the eastern and southern borders the commune is entirely farmland.

The Canal latéral à l'Aisne forms the southern border of the commune and the Aisne river forms the eastern border then runs through the south of the commune parallel to the canal as it flows west to eventually join the Seine at Conflans-Sainte-Honorine.

=== Heraldry ===
Arms of Avaux	The official status of the blazon remains to be determined. Blazon: Azure, a lion crowned Argent issuant, in chief Or a crescent of Sable between two mullets the same.

== Administration ==
List of Successive Mayors

From	To	Name
2001	2008	Pascal Beguin
2008	current	Didier Marby

== Demography ==
The inhabitants of the commune are known as Avalois or Avaloises in French.

Historical population

Year	Pop.	±% p.a.
1793	506	—
1821	644	+0.87%
1846	682	+0.23%
1872	710	+0.15%
1901	602	−0.57%
1926	431	−1.33%
1946	359	−0.91%
1962	355	−0.07%
1968	327	−1.36%

Year	Pop.	±% p.a.
1975	317	−0.44%
1982	293	−1.12%
1990	404	+4.10%
1999	454	+1.30%
2007	462	+0.22%
2012	455	−0.30%
2017	466	+0.48%
2023	520	+1.84%

Source: EHESS and INSEE

== Sites and monuments ==
Avaux was once called Asfeld-le-Château as it was the seat of a fortified house of the Counts of Avaux. The chateau has disappeared.

The Church of Notre-Dame contains a Painting: the Nativity of the Virgin (18th century), which is registered as an historical object.

== Notable people linked to the commune ==
- Claude de Mesmes, Count of Avaux (1595-1650), diplomat and man of letters.
- Jean-Jacques de Mesmes, Count of Avaux: best known for developing the town of Asfeld.
- Yves Gibeau, his family came from Avaux and he lived in the commune during part of his youth.

== See also ==
- Communes of the Ardennes department
