= Antoine Masson =

French painter and engraver

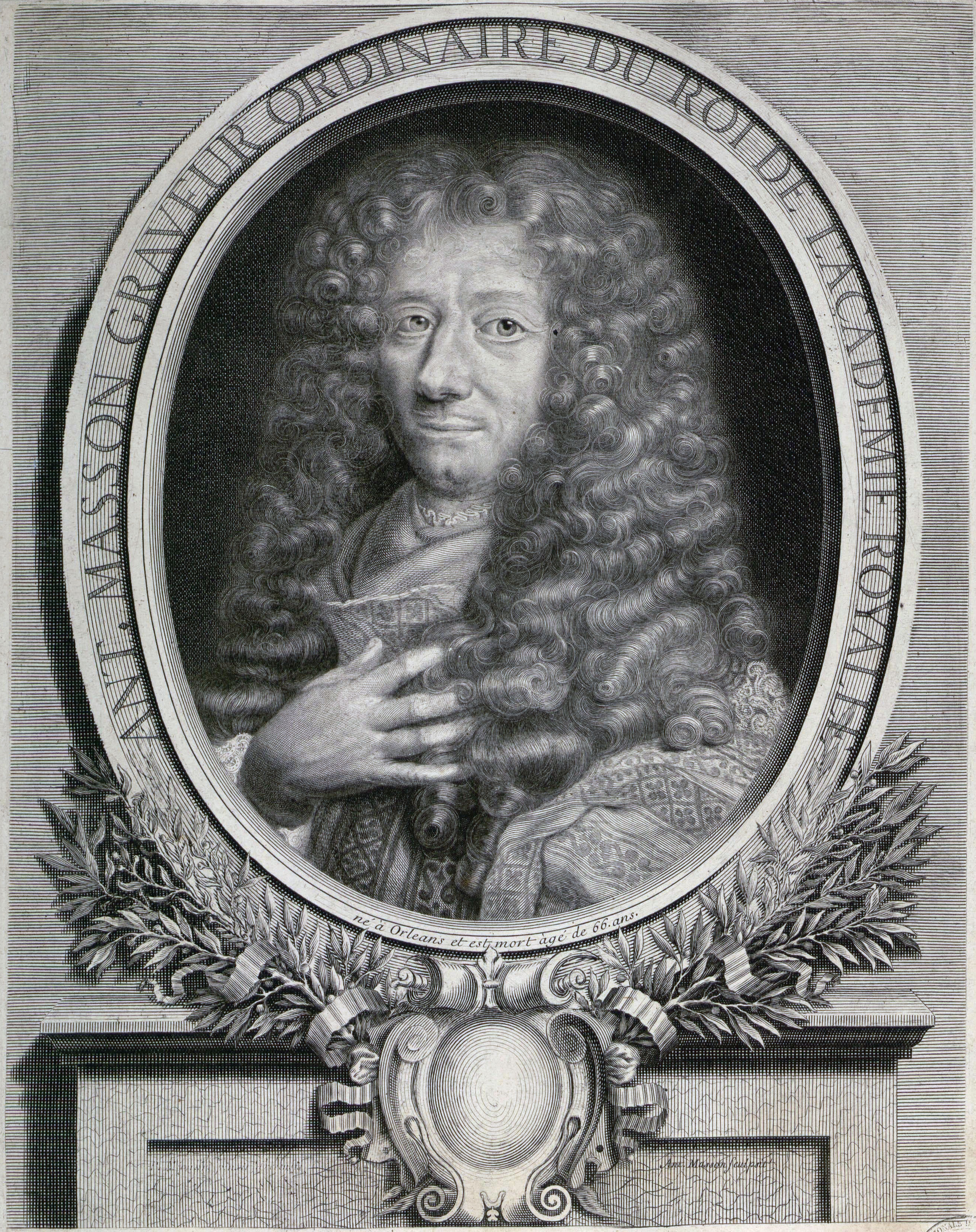
Antoine Masson, engraved by Masson after a painting by Pierre Mignard.

Antoine Masson (1636 – 30 May 1700, in Paris) was a French painter, but above all a line engraver, born at Loury, near Orléans.

He learned engraving as an armorer's apprentice and had no other teaching. He was received (reçu) by the Académie Royale de Peinture et de Sculpture in 1679 and exhibited at the Paris Salon of 1699.

He engraved 68 plates, mostly portraits, of which the most celebrated are those of Henri de Lorraine, count of Harcourt, known as the "Cadet à la Perle," Gaspard Charrier, and Olivier d'Ormesson. His most famous subject is "The Pilgrims of Emmaus," after Titian, known as "The Tablecloth", because of the extreme care with which Masson has rendered the texture of linen.

Among his few surviving drawings are pastels of Charles II, King of England (Musée Magnin) and Pierre Dupuis (Louvre). His work shows extraordinary facility and great talent for color, but it is often marred by mannerisms, such as in his engraved portrait of Guy Patin, in which the nose was formed from one spiral cut.

His daughter, Madeleine Masson (1666–1713), married the engraver Nicolas Habert. Antoine Masson died in Paris.

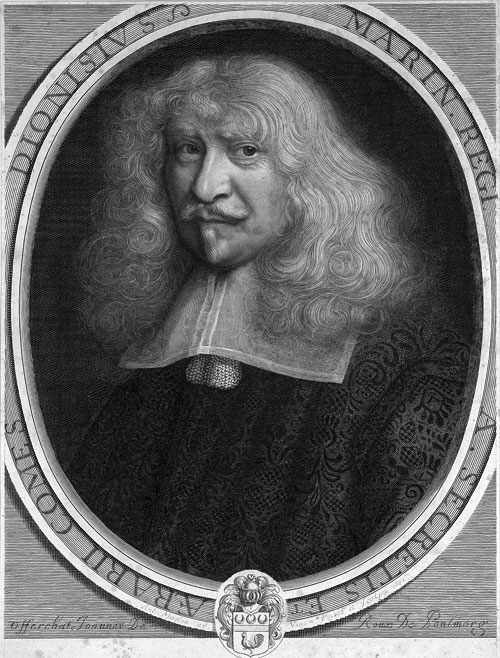
Portrait of Denis Marin, 1672

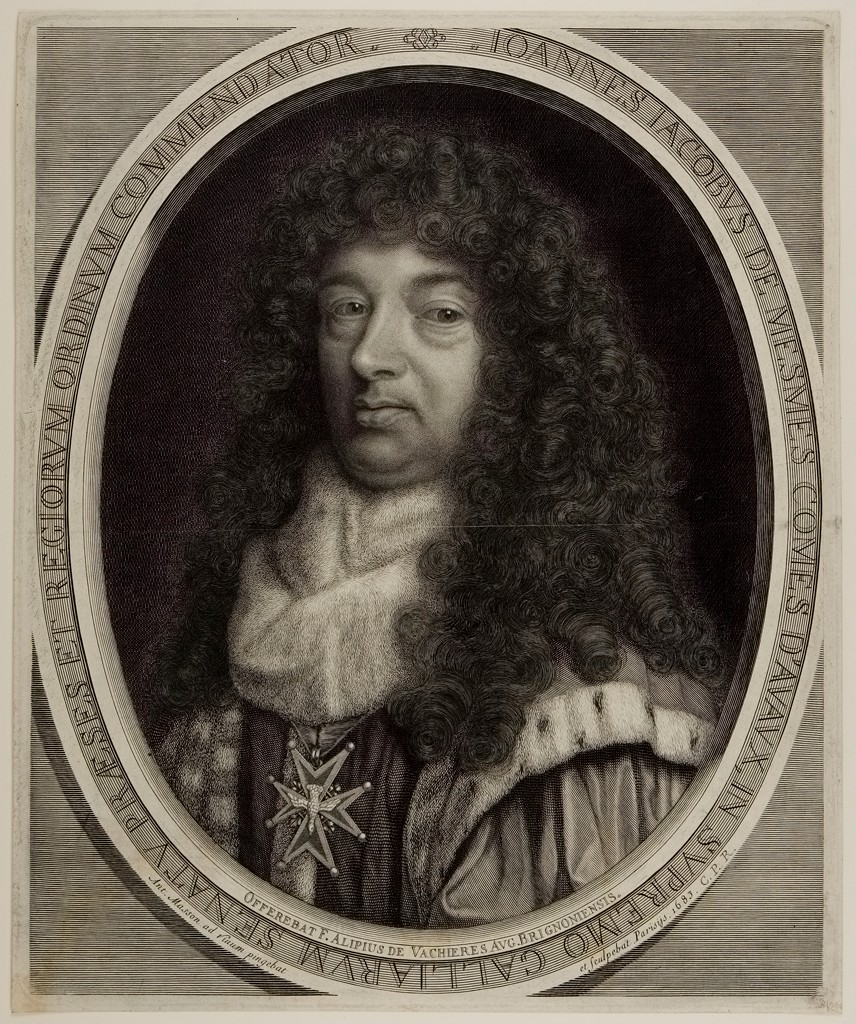
Portrait of Jean-Jacques de Mesmes, 1683

== Bibliography ==
- Bryan, Michael (1816). "Masson, Anthony" in A Biographical and Critical Dictionary of Painters and Engravers, 2 volumes. London: Carpenter; J. Booker; Whittingham and Arliss. Volumes 1 and 2 at Google Books.
- Gilman et al., editors (1905). "Masson, Antoine" in New International Encyclopedia, volume 13 at the Internet Archive.
- Herluison, Henri (1863). Masson (Antoine), pp. 38–39 in Artistes orléanais. Orléans: H. Herluison.
- Meyer, Véronique. "Masson, Antoine". Grove Art Online. Oxford Art Online. Oxford University Press, accessed 11 January 2015, subscription required.
- Robert-Dumesnil, A. P. F. (1836). "Antoine Masson", vol. 2, pp. 98–139, in Le Peintre-graveur français. Paris: Warée; Huzard. Copy at Google Books.
