= Jean-Antoine de Mesmes (premier président) =

French magistrate (1661–1723)

- comte d'Avaux
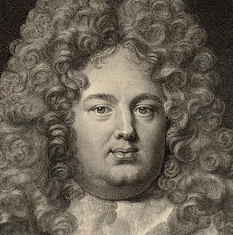
- Detail from the portrait below
- Tenure: 1688–1723
- Predecessor: Jean-Jacques de Mesmes
- Successor: Jean Jacques de Mesmes
- Born: 18 November 1661
- Died: 23 August 1723 (aged 61)
- Spouse: Marie-Therèse Feydeau
- Issue Detail: Marie-Anne-Antoinette & others
- Father: Jean-Jacques de Mesmes
- Mother: Marguerite Bertrand de la Bazinière
- Occupation: Premier Président

Jean-Antoine de Mesmes, comte d'Avaux (1661–1723) was a premier president of the Parlement of Paris and member of the Académie française. As premier president he presided at the rescinding of the will of Louis XIV and in 1720 at the remonstrance against the regent, Philippe of Orléans, for allowing John Law's disastrous financial scheme and appointing Guillaume Dubois as archbishop of Cambrai.

== Birth and origins ==
Jean-Antoine de Mesmes was born on 18 November 1661 as the eldest of the five children of Jean-Jacques de Mesmes and his wife Marguerite Bertrand de la Bazinière. His father and his grandfather had both been comtes d'Avaux and presidents at the Parlement of Paris. His mother was the daughter of Macé Bertrand de la Bazinière (1632–1688), trésorier de l'Épargne.

The subject of this article, Jean-Antoine de Mesmes (died 1723), may be easily confused with other members of his family who had the same first name, notably his grandfather Jean-Antoine de Mesmes, comte d'Avaux (died 1673) and his uncle Jean-Antoine de Mesmes, called d'Avaux (died 1709), the diplomat. Jean-Antoine had two brothers and two sisters, who are listed in his father's article.

Family tree

Jean-Antoine de Mesmes with wife, parents, and other selected relatives. (Note: Also see the lists of siblings and children in the text.)

Jean- Antoine; 1598–1673; President	Anne; Courtin
Marguerite; B de la Bazinière	Jean- Jacques; 1630–1688; President	Jean- Antoine; 1640–1709; Diplomat
Jean- Antoine; 1661–1723	Marie- Therèse; Feydeau; 1674–1705	Jean- Jacques; 1675–1741; Knt. of Malta
Guy; Nicholas de Durfort de Lorges; 1683–1758	Marie- Anne- Antoinette; 1696–1757	Henriette- Antoinette m. 1715

Legend

XXX	Subject of the article	XXX	Comtes d'Avaux

== Paris parlement ==
In 1679 Jean-Antoine de Mesmes became procureur-général at the Parlement of Paris; conseiller in 1687. In 1688, at this father's death, he inherited his father's place as président à mortier, even though he had never been maître des recherches.

In 1712, d'Avaux was appointed Premier President of the Parlement of Paris when his predecessor Pelletier resigned. He moved to the apartment reserved for the premier president in the Palais de la Cité and rented the Hôtel de Mesmes to John Law, who made it the seat of his Banque Générale.

When Louis XIV died in 1715, the future Louis XV, his great-great-grandson, was five years old. According to custom Philippe of Orléans, the closest relative, would govern France as regent. However, Louis XIV made a will in which he appointed a regency council dominated by his favourite but illegitimate son Louis-Auguste, Duke of Maine. The king gave this will to d'Avaux, the premier président for safe-keeping in August 1714. The will was opened after the king's death in September 1715. D'Orléans asked the Parlement of Paris to overrule the will. The parlement agreed and declared d'Orléans regent. In exchange Orléans gave the parlement back its Right of Remonstrance. Jean-Antoine de Mesmes used this right later to admonish the regent in 1720 for the Law affair and for the appointment of Guillaume Dubois as Archbishop of Cambrai. This action earned the Parlement of Paris an exile to Pontoise.

== Noble titles ==
While his father was alive, Jean-Antoine de Mesmes's title was vicomte de Neufchâtel. He became the fifth comte d'Avaux at his father's death in 1688. He was also seigneur de Cramayel, et de Brie-Comte-Robert, marquis de Saint-Etienne, and vicomte de Neufchâtel.

== Order of the Holy Spirit ==
On 22 September 1703 Jean-Antoine de Mesmes became Provost and Master of Ceremonies of the Order of the Holy Spirit. The order of the Holy Spirit is the highest order of chivalry in France, but membership and offices could be inherited and bought. Jean-Antoine de Mesmes bought this office from his paternal uncle and homonym Jean-Antoine de Mesmes (diplomat), the diplomat for 160,000 livres.

== Academie française ==
Portrait by Hyacinthe Rigaud engraved by Pierre Drevet. Note his attire as président à mortier: robe and striped ermine epitoge.

Jean-Antoine de Mesmes was elected to the twenty-second seat of the Académie française on 18 January 1710, replacing (and thus eulogizing) Louis de Verjus, comte de Crécy, and was received by François de Callières on 20 March 1710. Pierre-Joseph Alary followed him as the next occupant of the seat. His father had also been a member of the Académie from 1676 to 1688.

== Great Nights of Sceaux ==
Jean-Antoine de Mesmes was a familiar of the court of the duchesse du Maine in her Château de Sceaux. In 1714 he played the king of the night in the second, third, and fifth great night at Sceaux.

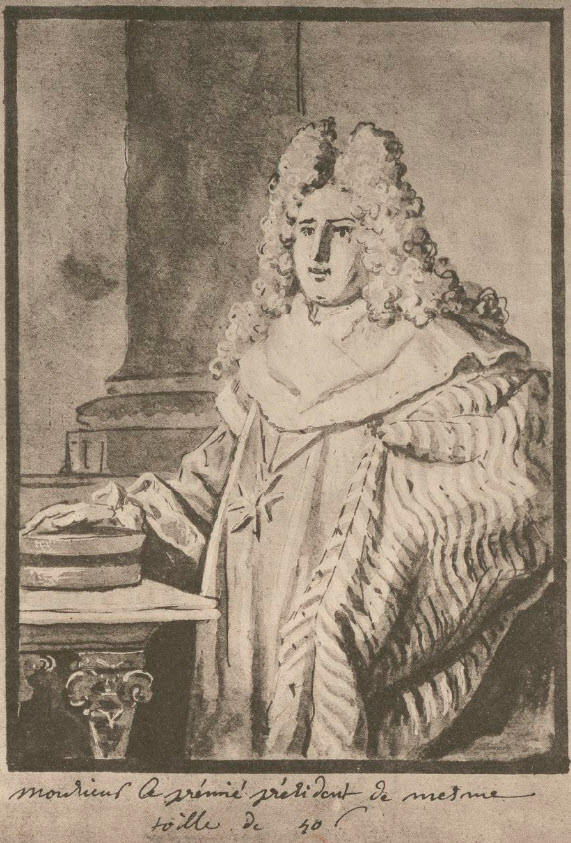
The text reads: Monsieur le premier président de Mesmes. He is shown dressed as président à mortier. He wears the cross of the Order of the Holy Spirit on his breast on the cordon bleu. The disk-like object on the table under his right hand is the mortier, a mortarboard-like hat.

== Marriage and children ==
Jean-Antoine de Mesmes married Marie-Therèse Feydeau in 1695. Her dowry was 350,000 francs in cash and 50,000 francs in other effects. She was the daughter of Denys Feydeau, seigneur de Brou.

Jean-Antoine and Marie-Therèse had two daughters:

1. Marie-Anne-Antoinette (1696–1757), married in 1720 Guy Nicolas de Durfort, duc de Lorges as his 2nd wife;
2. Henriette-Antoinette, married in 1715 Louis de Gélas de Leberon, marquis de Lautrec, the son of d'Ambres.

As there were no sons they were rich heiresses. His elder daughter's husband was the eldest son and heir of Guy Aldonce de Durfort, duc de Lorges, the father-in-law of Louis de Rouvroy, duc de Saint-Simon. Jean-Antoine de Mesmes is therefore often mentioned in the memoirs of Saint-Simon where he is distinguished from his homonyms by his title of premier president.

== Death, succession, and timeline ==
Jean-Antoine de Mesmes died suddenly on 23 August 1723 at the age of 61. As he had no son, his youngest and only surviving brother Jean-Jacques, numbered Jean-Jacques IV de Mesmes, the Maltese knight, succeeded him as the sixth and last comte d'Avaux. His younger daughter Henriette-Antoinette inherited Cramayel.

At his death, his family neglected to advertise his membership of the academy in his obituary; when the academy expressed a certain astonishment, his brother Jean-Jacques sent a letter of apology and regret.

Timeline
Age	Date	Event
0	1661, 18 Nov	Born first son of Jean-Jacques de Mesmes.
26	1688, 9 Jan	Father died and he became comte d'Avaux and président à mortier.
33	1695, 23 May	Married Marie Therèse Feydeau.
41	1703, 22 Sep	Bought the office of prevost and master of ceremonies of the Order of the Holy Spirit.
48	1710, 20 Mar	Elected to Seat 22 of the Académie française.
50	1712, 5 Jan	Became premier president of the Parlement of Paris.
59	1720, 14 Dec	Elder daughter marries Guy Nicolas de Durfort, Duc de Lorges.
61	1723, 23 Aug	Died, leaving two daughters and no son.

== Notes and references ==
=== Sources ===
- Alembert, Jean Le Rond d' (1786). Histoire des membres de l'Académie françoise (in French). Vol. Tome quatrième. Paris: Moutard. OCLC 313742773.
- Anselme, Père (1733). Histoire généalogique et chronologique de la maison royale de France (in French). Vol. Tome neuvième (Troisième édition ed.). Paris: Compagnie des libraires associez. OCLC 831196155. – Knights of the Order of the Holy Spirit and general index
- Boulliot, Jean Baptiste Joseph (1830). Biographie ardennaise (in French). Vol. Tome premier. Paris: Chez l'éditeur, rue de l'Arbre sec. OCLC 239338707.
- Dangeau, Philippe de Courcillon, marquis de (1854). Conches, Feuillet de (ed.). Journal du marquis de Dangeau (in French). Vol. Tome Deuxième. Paris: Firmin Didot Frères. OCLC 310446765. – 1687 to 1689
- Dangeau, Philippe de Courcillon, marquis de (1855). Conches, Feuillet de (ed.). Journal du marquis de Dangeau (in French). Vol. Tome Cinquième. Paris: Firmin Didot Frères. OCLC 310446765. – 1694 to 1695–1696
- Dangeau, Philippe de Courcillon, marquis de (1857). Conches, Feuillet de (ed.). Journal du marquis de Dangeau (in French). Vol. Tome Neuvième. Paris: Firmin Didot Frères. OCLC 310446765. – 1702 to 1704
- Dangeau, Philippe de Courcillon, marquis de (1858). Conches, Feuillet de (ed.). Journal du marquis de Dangeau (in French). Vol. Tome Quatorzième. Paris: Firmin Didot Frères. OCLC 310446765. – 1711 to 1713
- Jullien, Adolphe (1885). La comédie à la cour - Les théatres de société royale pendant les siècle dernier (in French). Paris: Firmin-Didot. OCLC 1047497240.
- La Chesnaye des Bois, François Alexandre Aubert de (1770). Dictionnaire de la noblesse (in French). Vol. I (2nd ed.). Paris: Duchesne. OCLC 491609675. – ABA to BAR (here preferred over Schlesinger's edition as it has more detail)
- Moréri, Louis (1759a). Le grand dictionnaire historique ou le mélange curieux de l'histoire sacrée et profane (PDF) (in French). Vol. Tome quatrième. Paris: Pierre Augustin Le Mercier. OCLC 1070379896. – Con to E (for Durfort)
- Moréri, Louis (1759b). Le grand dictionnaire historique ou le mélange curieux de l'histoire sacrée et profane (PDF) (in French). Vol. Tome septième. Paris: Pierre Augustin Le Mercier. OCLC 1070379896. – M to N (for Mesmes)
- Saint-Simon, Louis de Rouvroy, duc de (1895). Boislisle, Arthur de (ed.). Mémoires du duc de Saint-Simon (in French). Vol. Tome onzième. Paris: Hachette. OCLC 1068033585. – 1703
- Saint-Simon, Louis de Rouvroy, duc de (1910). Boislisle, Arthur de (ed.). Mémoires du duc de Saint-Simon (in French). Vol. Tome vingt et deuxième. Paris: Hachette. OCLC 1068033585. – 1711 to 1712
- Saint-Simon, Louis de Rouvroy, duc de (1925). Boislisle, Arthur de (ed.). Mémoires du duc de Saint-Simon (in French). Vol. Tome trente et septième. Paris: Hachette. OCLC 1068033585. – 1719 to 1720
