= Pierre Dupuis =

French painter (1610–1682)

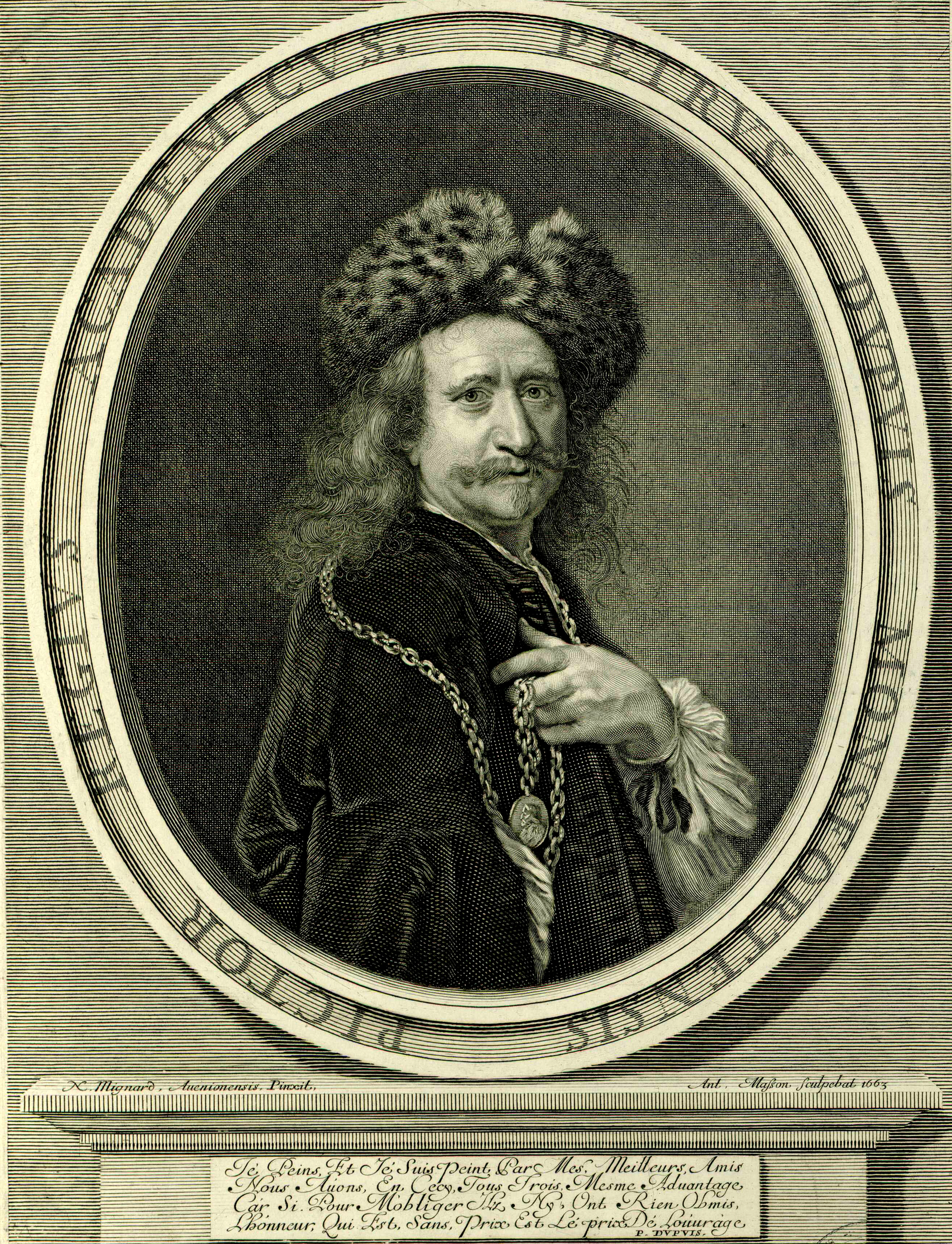
Portrait of Pierre Dupuis, engraving by Antoine Masson after Nicolas Mignard, 1663

Pierre Dupuis or Pierre Dupuys (3 March 1610 – 18 February 1682) was a French painter born in Montfort-l'Amaury. Dupuis was successful during his life and in 1646 he was appointed Peintre Ordinaire des Ecuries du Roi by his patron Henri de Lorraine, comte d'Harcourt, with the consent of Anne of Austria. In 1664 he was accepted into the Académie Royale de Peinture.

He lived in Italy, where he met Pierre Mignard (1612–1695) in 1637. He was a specialist of still lifes and his style was influenced by Northern Europe painting and Protestant religion. His paintings of bouquets, which show the influence of Jacques Linard (1600–1645) and Louise Moillon (1610–1696), were very appreciated in his time. Dupuis died in Paris in 1682.

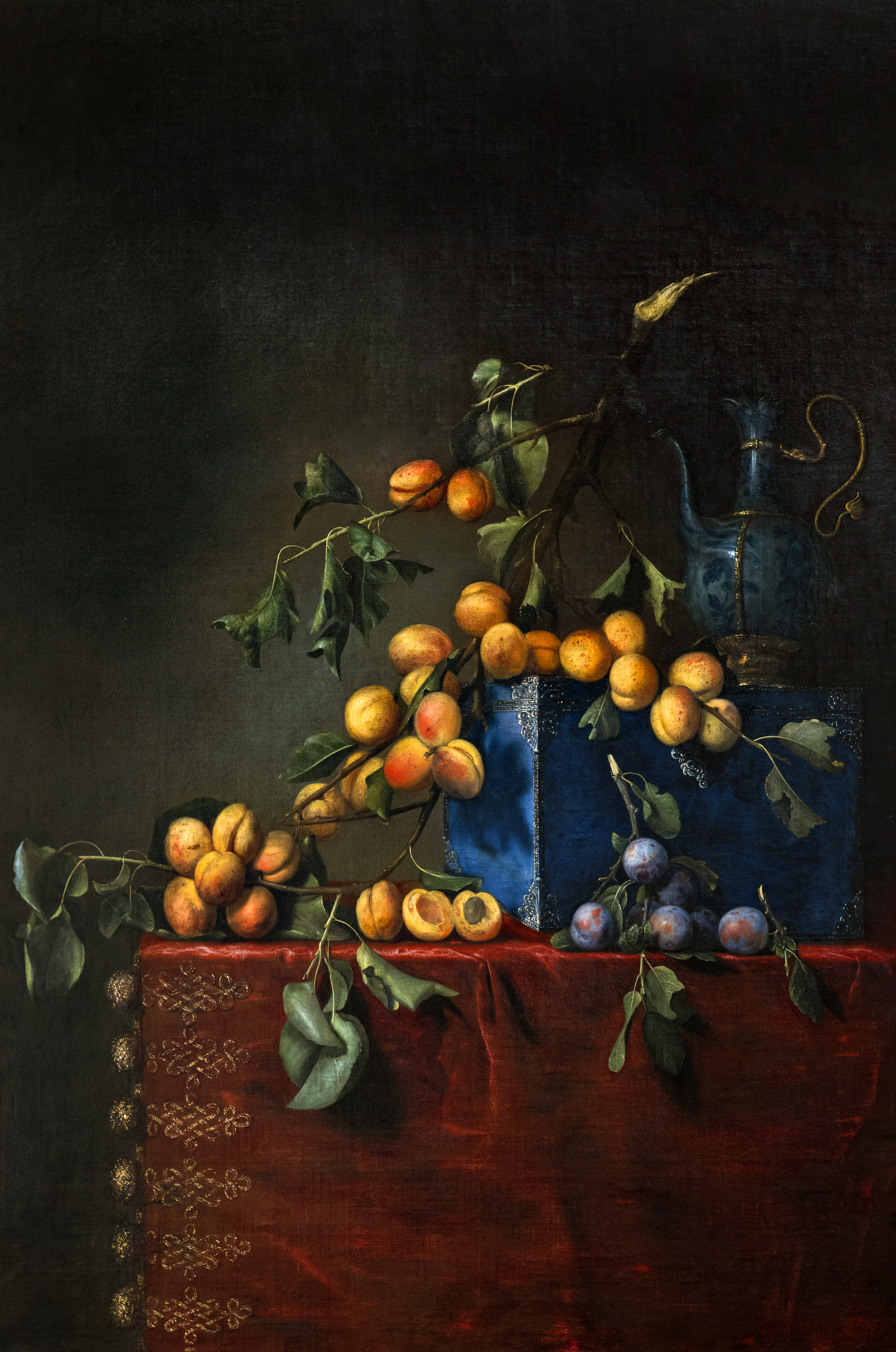
Still life with apricot and plum branches

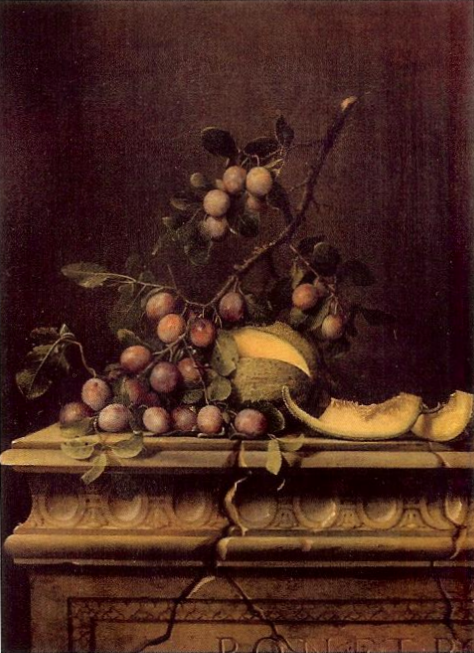
Title unknown; still life, melons and plums
