= Lor, Aisne =

Lor
- Commune
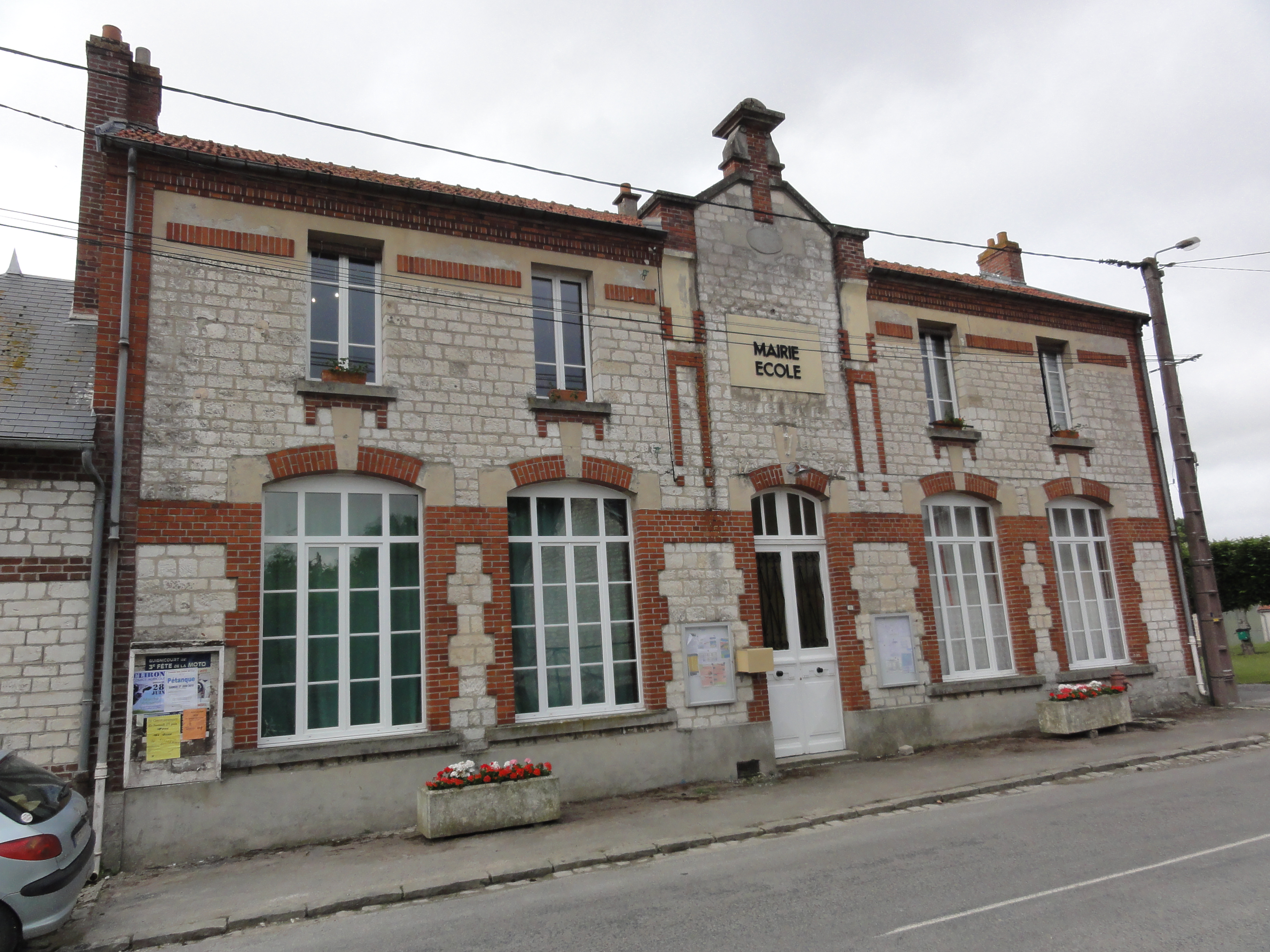
- The town hall and school of Lor

- Coat of arms
- Location of Lor
- Location within France Location within Hauts-de-France
- Coordinates: 49°31′53″N 4°03′01″E
- Country: France
- Region: Hauts-de-France
- Department: Aisne
- Arrondissement: Laon
- Canton: Villeneuve-sur-Aisne
- Intercommunality: Champagne Picarde

Government
  - Mayor (2026–32): Didier Feron
- Area^{1}: 8.87 km^{2} (3.42 sq mi)
- Elevation: 86 m (282 ft)
- Highest elevation: 130 m (430 ft)
- Lowest elevation: 72 m (236 ft)
- Population (2023): 141
  - Density: 15.9/km^{2} (41.2/sq mi)
- Time zone: UTC+01:00 (CET)
  - Summer (DST): UTC+02:00 (CEST)
- INSEE/Postal code: 02440 /02190
- ^{1} French Land Register data, which excludes lakes, ponds, glaciers > 1 km^{2} (0.386 sq mi or 247 acres) and river estuaries.

Lor (French pronunciation: [lɔʁ]) is a commune in the Aisne department in Hauts-de-France in northern France. It is around 30 km north of Reims.

== Population ==
Historical population
Year	Pop.	±% p.a.
1968	143	—
1975	135	−0.82%
1982	113	−2.51%
1990	111	−0.22%
1999	122	+1.06%
2007	140	+1.74%
2012	147	+0.98%
2017	142	−0.69%
2023	141	−0.12%
Source: INSEE

== See also ==
- Communes of the Aisne department
