= Hôtel de Saint-Aignan =

Townhouse in Paris, France

Coordinates: 48.86114°N 2.35542°E

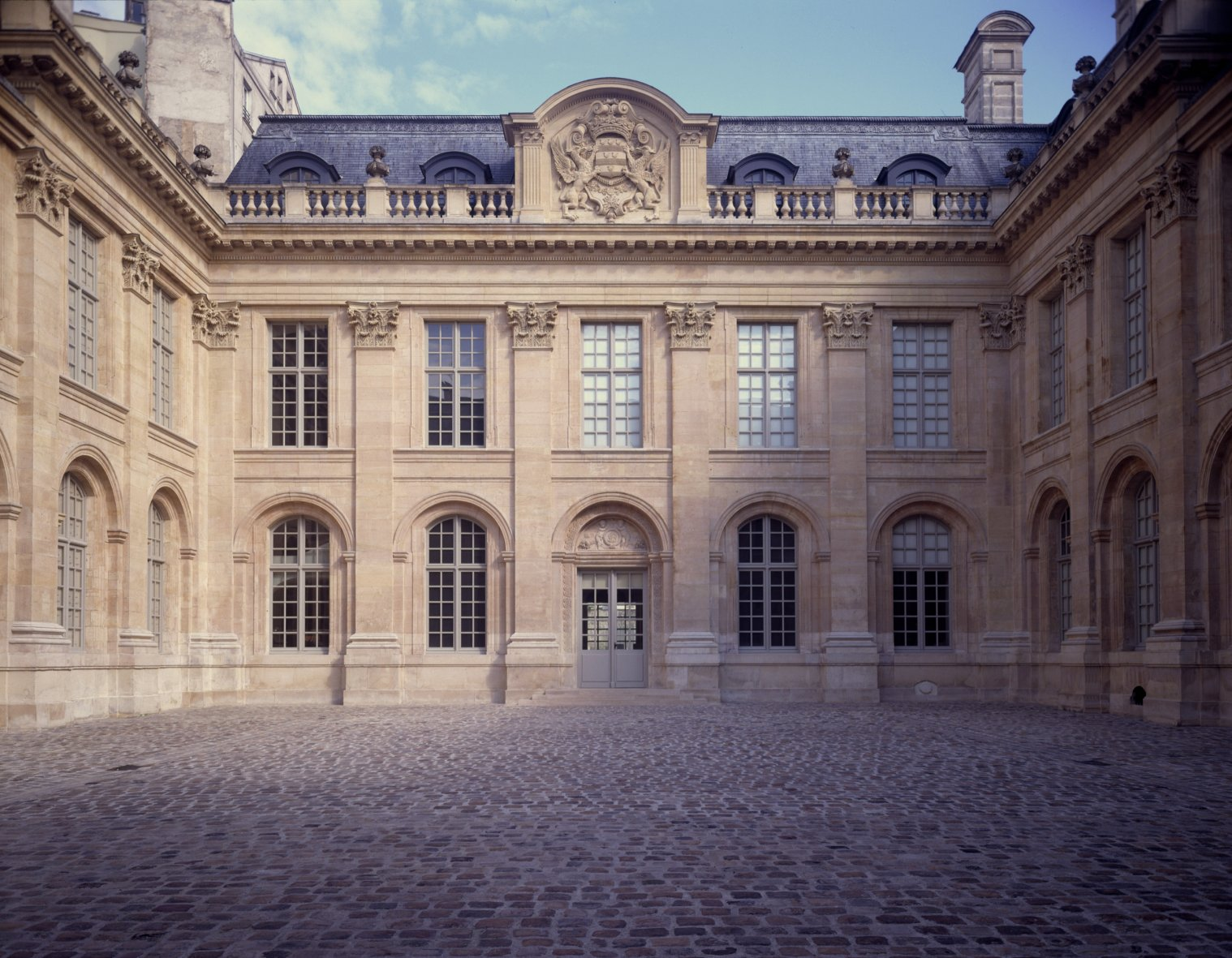
The courtyard of the Hôtel de Saint-Aignan

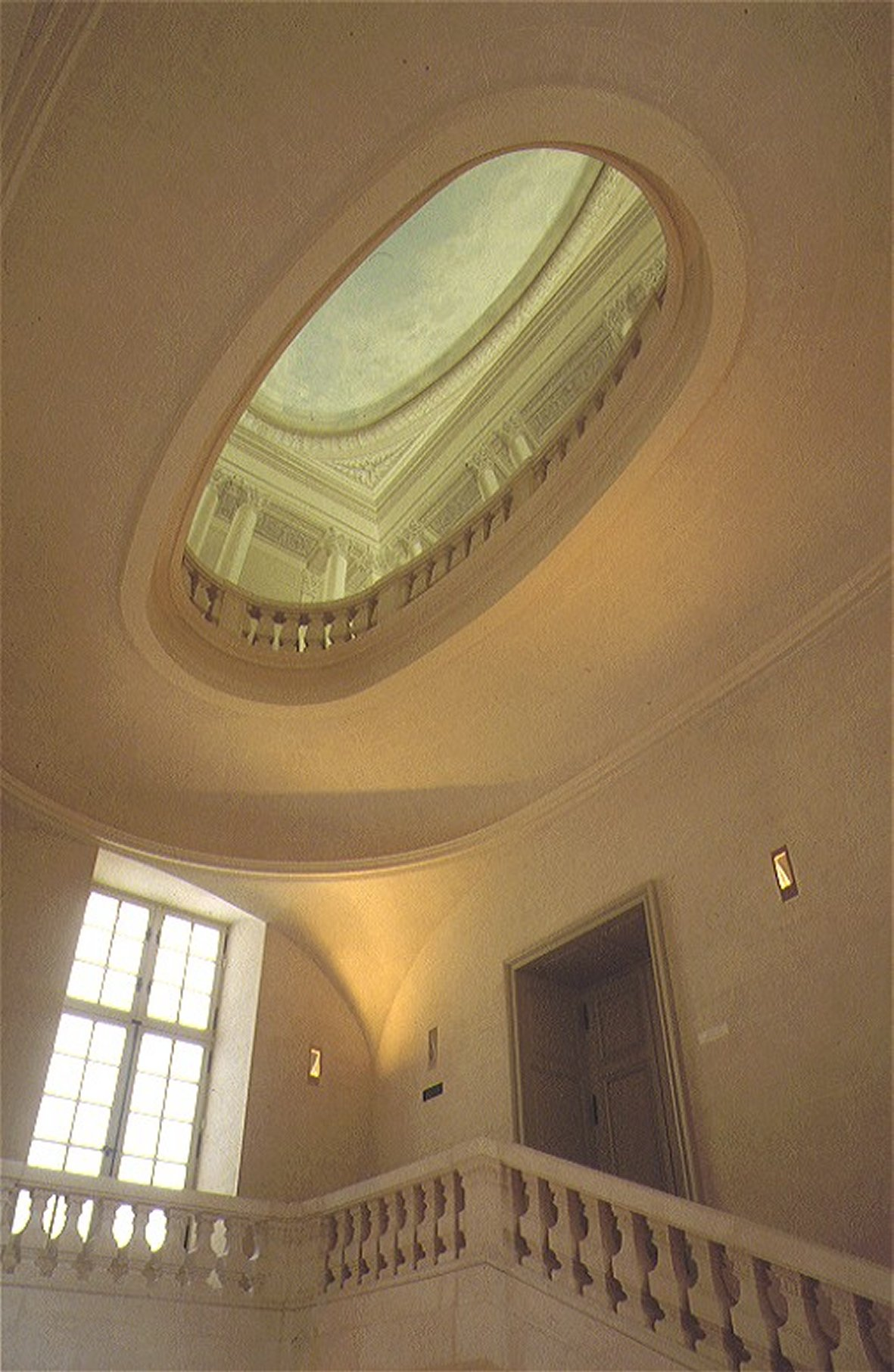
Grand staircase

The Hôtel de Saint-Aignan (French pronunciation: [otɛl də sɛ̃t‿ɛɲɑ̃]), originally the Hôtel d'Avaux ([otɛl davo]), is a 17th-century hôtel particulier, located at 71 Rue de Temple, in the 3rd arrondissement and the Marais district of Paris. It was constructed 1644–1650 to the designs of the architect Pierre Le Muet for Cardinal Mazarin's Superintendent of Finances, Claude de Mesmes, Comte d'Avaux, and later purchased by Paul de Beauvilliers, Duc de Saint-Aignan, who added the grand staircase. It is now the home of the Musée d'Art et d'Histoire du Judaïsme.

== History ==
The hôtel was bought by Paul de Beauvilliers, second Duke of Saint-Aignan, in 1688. He began a campaign to refurbish and modernize the mansion. The second floor was turned into apartments and the gardener André Le Nôtre redesigned the garden as a French formal garden.

The Hôtel de Saint-Aignan was confiscated by the French state in 1792 following the French Revolution. It became the headquarters of the seventh municipality of Paris in 1795, then of the seventh arrondissement until 1823. It was then divided into various commercial premises. Pictures from the early 20th century, especially those taken by Eugène Atget and the Frères Seeberger, show the life of Jewish artisans from Russia, Poland, Romania, and Ukraine who lived in the building.

During the roundups of Jews of 1942 by the French Vichy government, several inhabitants of the building were arrested and deported. Thirteen Jewish inhabitants of the Hotel were murdered in the Nazi death camps.

The Hôtel de Saint-Aignan was bought by the City of Paris in 1962 and was classified as a historical monument in 1963.

A first restoration campaign began in 1978 directed by Jean-Pierre Jouve, Chief Architect of the National Office of Historic Monuments and Sites. The second restoration campaign opened in 1991, directed by Bernard Fonquernie, also Chief Architect of the National Office of Historic Monuments and Sites.

At the initiative of the mayor of Paris, Jacques Chirac, the hôtel was chosen in 1986 for the installation of a museum dedicated to Jewish civilization: the Museum of Jewish Art and History.

== Architecture ==
The mansion was built on a large irregular plot of land occupied by the townhouse Claude d’Avaux inherited in 1642. Pierre Le Muet demolished the old building and followed the usual ground plan for large aristocratic mansions: the residence itself set back from the street with a large rectangular courtyard at the rear. The right wing's ground floor housed the kitchen, the servants’ rooms, and the dining room. This area is now the museum's bookshop, where the public can admire a number of exceptional frescos discovered when the building was being restored. An archway led through to a second, smaller courtyard, where the outhouses and stables had their own street entrance. To create a sense of symmetry, Le Muet decorated the blank wall of the adjoining property on the left with pilasters and false windows imitating the right wing. This wall was a remain from a wall built under Philippe-Auguste at the end of the 12th century.

Paul de Beauvilliers, Duke of Saint-Aignan, bought the mansion in 1688. He undertook a campaign to refurbish and modernize the building, extending the right wing with rooms on the garden side. He built a grand staircase and set up apartments in the old gallery on the second floor. The restorations made in the 20th century used the end of the 17th century as a reference period.

== Bibliography ==
- Ayers, Andrew (2004). The Architecture of Paris. Stuttgart; London: Edition Axel Menges. ISBN 9783930698967.
- Gady, Alexandre (2008). Les Hôtels particuliers de Paris du Moyen Âge à la Belle Époque. Paris: Parigramme. ISBN 9782840962137.
- Mignot, Claude (1996). "Le Muet, Pierre", vol. 19, pp. 144–146, in The Dictionary of Art, 34 volumes, edited by Jane Turner, reprinted with minor corrections in 1998. New York: Grove. ISBN 9781884446009.
