= Mesme =

Mesme may be,

- Mesme language
- Mesme Taşbağ

== See also ==
- Ruby Butler DeMesme
- Sainte-Mesme
- Mesmes (disambiguation)
