= Jean-Aymar Piganiol de La Force =

French Geographical Writer

Jean-Aymar Piganiol de la Force (Aurillac, Auvergne (province) 1673 – Paris, 1753), son of Pierre and of Marguerite Parisot, dame de La Force, was a French man of letters known above all for works of a descriptive geographical character, for which he travelled extensively in France. He held an appointment as historiographer royal, resulting in his Description de la France.

He spent his youth at his mother's family château de La Force at Saint-Simon, Cantal on the little River Jordanne, near Aurillac, where he studied.

Piganiol de la Force for four decades was the tutor to the young pages of the comte de Toulouse, and as a young man wrote a set of Mémoires des intendants pour l’instruction du duc de Bourgogne (1698)

== Selected works ==
- Nouvelle description des châteaux et parcs de Versailles et de Marly (1702)
- Nouvelles descriptions historiques et géographiques de la France, 1715, in 5 volumes, and 1751-1753, in 15 volumes
- Nouveau voyage en France, 1724, 2 volumes
- Description de la ville de Paris et de ses environs, 1742, 10 volumes.
