= Hambye Abbey =

Benedictine abbey in Hambye, France

Notre Dame d'Hambye
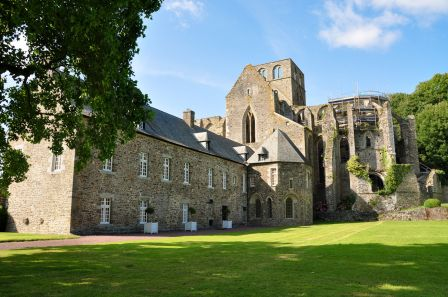

- Location within France

Religion
- Affiliation: Catholic Church
- Region: Normandy

Location
- Location: Normandy, France
- Municipality: Hambye
- State: Manche
- Interactive map of Notre Dame d'Hambye
- Coordinates: 48.9217°N 1.2647°W

Hambye abbey is a Benedictine medieval monastery located in the countryside of Normandy. It lies in the valley of Sienne in a rural preserved environment. Today, it is on the territory of the municipality of Hambye.

== History ==
Located in the Normandy countryside, near to Mont Saint-Michel, the Abbey of Notre Dame of Hambye was founded around 1145 by William Painel, Lord of Hambye, and Algare, bishop of Coutances (the Diocese of place). The monastery was established by a group of Benedictine monks from Tiron (Perche region in south-east of Basse-Normandie). Fueled by an ideal of rigor and austerity close to that of Cistercians, these Benedictine monks built a sober and elegant abbey, typical of the early Gothic period. The construction took place in the late 12th and early 13th centuries. The religious community reached its apogee in the 13th century and then, after a long decline over the following centuries, disappeared in the 1780s.

Like all French abbeys, it became national property at the beginning of the Revolution. Eventually, the abbey was sold in 1790. The owners transformed or destroyed buildings and scattered the furnishings. Having belonged to the abbey for three centuries (16th-18th centuries), the altarpiece was also sold. The convent buildings became farm buildings. The abbey church was used as a quarry from 1810, and was gradually dismantled.

== Bibliography ==
- Le Conte, René (1891). Curiositez Normandes comparées. Études historiques et archéologiques sur les abbayes de bénédictins en général et sur celle de Hambye en particulier. Bernay.
- Joyeux, Guylaine (2003). L'Abbaye de Hambye. OREP. ISBN 2-912925-39-8.
- Musset, Lucien; Bernard Beck; Élisabeth Beck (1968). L'Abbaye Notre-Dame de Hambye. Art de Basse-Normandie.
