= Neufchâtel-sur-Aisne =

- Commune
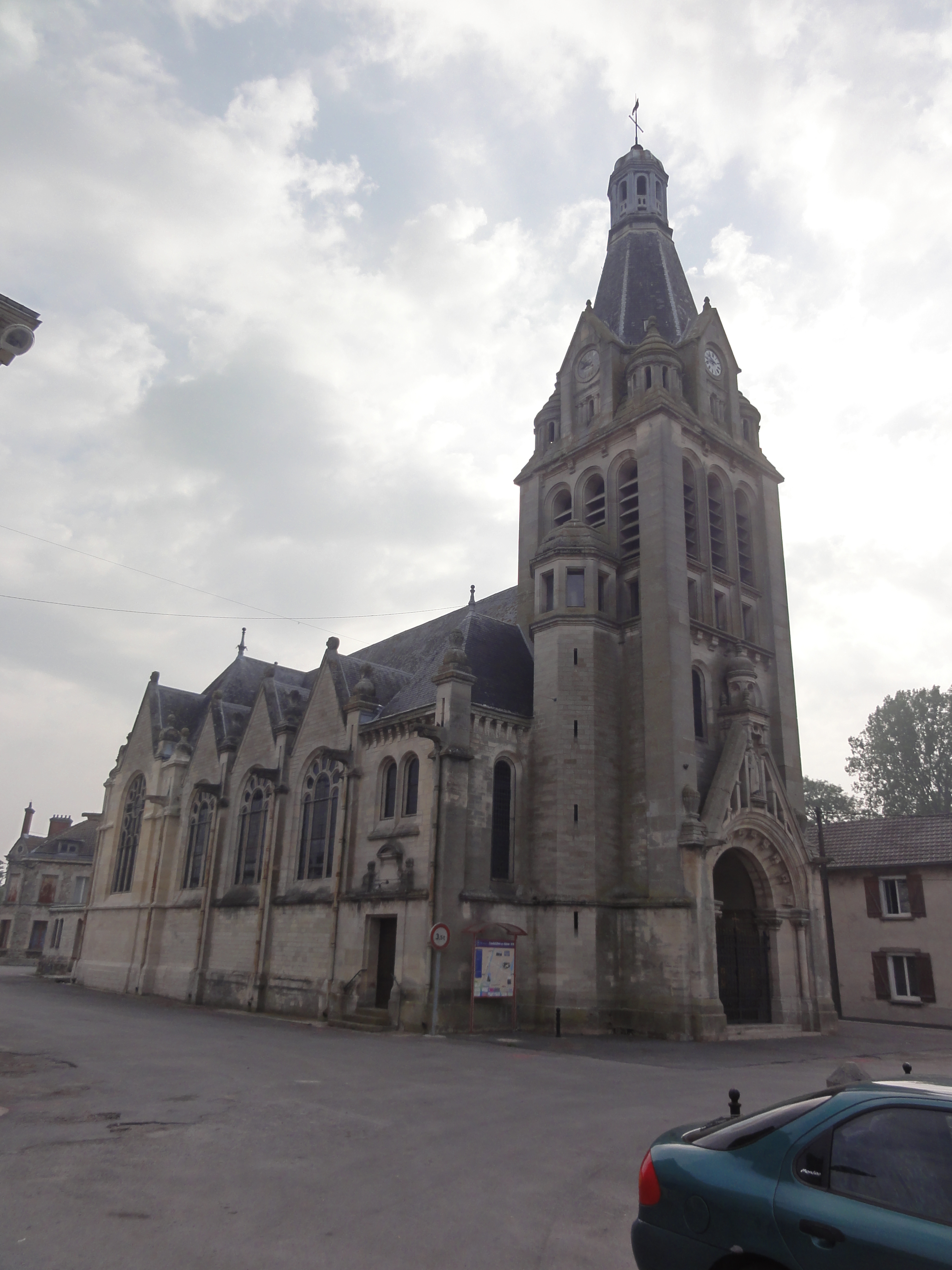
- The church of Neufchâtel-sur-Aisne
- Location of Neufchâtel-sur-Aisne
- Location within France Location within Hauts-de-France
- Coordinates: 49°26′N 4°02′E
- Country: France
- Region: Hauts-de-France
- Department: Aisne
- Arrondissement: Laon
- Canton: Villeneuve-sur-Aisne
- Intercommunality: Champagne Picarde

Government
  - Mayor (2026–32): Lionel Pierrot
- Area^{1}: 2.86 km^{2} (1.10 sq mi)
- Elevation: 59 m (194 ft)
- Highest elevation: 119 m (390 ft)
- Lowest elevation: 56 m (184 ft)
- Population (2023): 424
  - Density: 148/km^{2} (384/sq mi)
- Time zone: UTC+01:00 (CET)
  - Summer (DST): UTC+02:00 (CEST)
- INSEE/Postal code: 02541 /02190
- ^{1} French Land Register data, which excludes lakes, ponds, glaciers > 1 km^{2} (0.386 sq mi or 247 acres) and river estuaries.

Neufchâtel-sur-Aisne (French pronunciation: [nøʃɑtɛl syʁ ɛːn]) is a commune in the Aisne department in Hauts-de-France in northern France.

== Population ==
Historical population
Year	Pop.	±% p.a.
1968	455	—
1975	427	−0.90%
1982	403	−0.82%
1990	483	+2.29%
1999	492	+0.21%
2007	449	−1.14%
2012	402	−2.19%
2017	423	+1.02%
2023	424	+0.04%
Source: INSEE

== See also ==
- Communes of the Aisne department
