= Commendatory abbot =

Catholic ecclesiastical title

A commendatory abbot (Latin: abbas commendatarius) is an ecclesiastic, or sometimes a layman, who holds an abbey in commendam, drawing its revenues but not exercising any authority over its inner monastic discipline. If a commendatory abbot is an ecclesiastic, however, he may have limited jurisdiction.

Originally only vacant abbeys, or those that were temporarily without an actual superior, were given in commendam, in the latter case only until an actual superior was elected or appointed. An abbey is held in commendam, i.e. provisorily, in distinction to one held in titulum, which is a permanent benefice.

== History ==
Originally only vacant abbeys, or such as were temporarily without an actual superior, were given in commendam, in the latter case only until an actual superior was elected or appointed. Pope Gregory the Great (590–604) on various occasions gave vacant abbeys in commendam to bishops who had been driven from their episcopal sees by invading barbarians or whose own churches were too poor to furnish them a decent livelihood.

The practice began to be seriously abused in the eighth century when the Anglo-Saxon and Frankish kings assumed the right to set commendatory abbots over monasteries that were occupied by religious communities. Often these commendatory abbots were laymen, vassals of the kings, or others who were authorized to draw the revenues and manage the temporal affairs of the monasteries in reward for military services. The practice was especially widespread during the reigns of Henry IV, Holy Roman Emperor, Philip I of France, William the Conqueror, William Rufus, Henry I and Henry II of England. Such a system often proved disastrous for monastic discipline, as the commendatory “abbot” of the community was rarely a monk, nor was he often even present in the monastery.

Such a system divided the revenues of the monastery between the mensa abbatialis (the “abbot’s table”) and the mensa conventualis (the “monk’s table”) The commendatory abbot would take his portion, thereby reducing the resources of the monks. It was a common arrangement that the commendatory abbot would retain two thirds of the revenue for his own use and leave the remaining third for the support of the abbey. The commendatory bishop was bound to defray the expenses of the community, to keep the buildings in repair, to furnish the ornaments for divine service, and to give suitable alms. Nonetheless, many did not and buildings fell into disrepair and new members could even be turned away on account of a simple lack of funds.

After the eighth century various attempts were made by popes and councils to regulate the appointment of commendatory abbots. At the Concordat of Worms in 1122, when the Investiture Controversy was settled in favour of the church, the appointment of laymen as commendatory abbots was abolished. The practice again increased during the Avignon Papacy (1309–1377) and especially during the Papal Schism (1378–1417), when the papal claimants gave numerous abbeys in commendam in order to increase the number of their adherents.

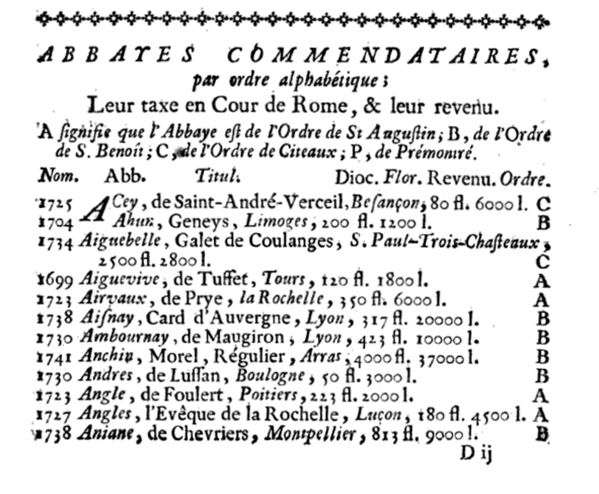
Partial list of the French commendatory abbeys in 1742

Boniface VIII (1294–1303) decreed that a benefice with the cure of souls attached should be granted in commendam only in great necessity or when evident advantage would accrue to the Church, but never for more than six months. Clement V (1305–1314) revoked benefices which had been granted by him in commendam earlier. The Council of Trent determined that vacant monasteries should be bestowed only on pious and virtuous regulars, and that the motherhouse of an order, and the abbeys and priories founded immediately from it, should no longer be granted in commendam. The succeeding bull "Superna" of Gregory XIII and the constitution "Pastoralis" of Innocent X greatly checked in commendam appointments but did not abolish them entirely. In spite of various efforts to reform such a system, it continued to plague the monastic orders throughout the centuries.

Especially in France, they continued to flourish to the detriment of the monasteries; for example Cluny Abbey. On the eve of the French Revolution of 1789, of the two-hundred-thirty-seven Cistercian institutions in France, only thirty-five were governed by regular Cistercian abbots. Some commendatory abbots led a very free and opulent life in the court of the sovereign.

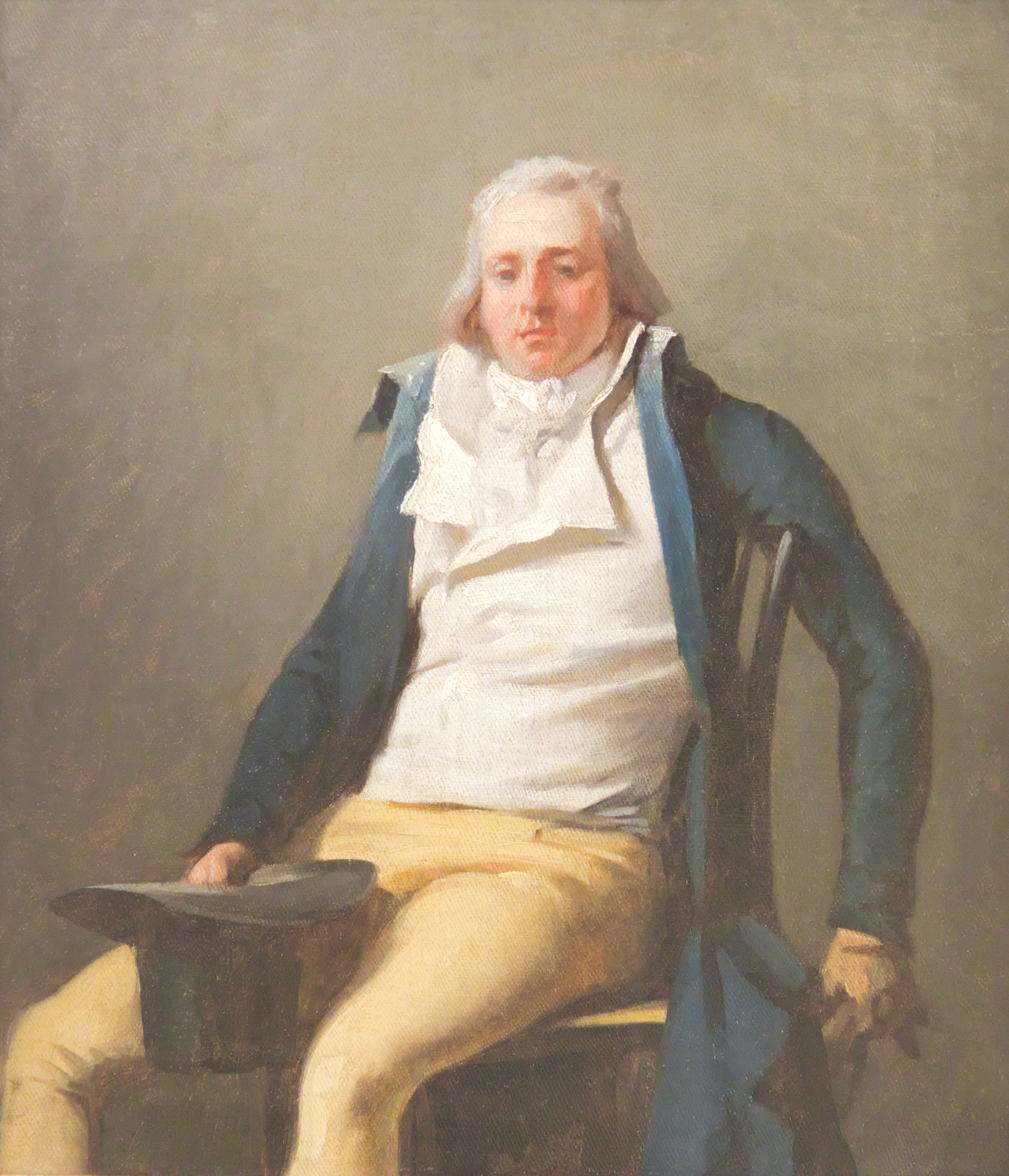
The count of Saint-Farre, like his brother the count of Saint-Albin, was commendatory abbot prior to the French Revolution. They were the illegitimate sons of Louis Philippe I, Duke of Orléans. Both led opulent lives.

Finally the French Revolution and the general secularization of monasteries in the beginning of the eighteenth century reduced the significance of commendatory abbots along with the significance of monasteries in general. Since that time commendatory abbots have become very rare, and the former abuses have been abolished by careful regulations. There are still a few commendatory abbots among the cardinals; Pope Pius X himself was Commendatory Abbot of the Benedictine monastery at Subiaco near Rome.

== Authority ==
If the monastery is occupied by a religious community where there is a separate mensa abbatialis, i.e. where the abbot and the convent have each a separate income, the commendatory abbot, who must then be an ecclesiastic, has jurisdiction in foro externo over the members of the community and enjoys all the rights and privileges of an actual abbot.

Under the title of Claustral Prior a regular superior was appointed to supervise the internal discipline of the house. If there is no separate mensa abbatialis, the power of the commendatory abbot extends only over the temporal affairs of the monastery. In case of vacant monasteries the commendatory abbot generally has all the rights and privileges of an actual abbot.

== See also ==
- Lay abbot
