= François-Alexandre Aubert de La Chesnaye Des Bois =

French writer, genealogist and compiler

- Writing career
- Notable work: Dictionary of Nobility

François Alexandre Aubert de La Chenaye-Desbois (17 June 1699 – 29 February 1783) was a French writer, genealogist and compiler.

== Life ==
Chenaye-Desbois was born in Ernée and died in Paris.

== Works ==
He is mainly known for his genealogical dictionaries of the French nobility. The first edition with the title Dictionnaire généalogique, héraldique, chronologique et historique was published by Duchesne in seven volumes (1757–1765). The second edition with the title Dictionnaire de la noblesse... ("Dictionary of Nobility...") was published by Duchesne in 15 volumes (1770–1786). The final three volumes were edited and continued by Jacques Badier. In the 19th century, a third edition was published by Schlesinger in 19 volumes (1863–1876). The third edition was reprinted in facsimile by Kraus in 1969.

The dictionary's full name is Dictionnaire de la noblesse, contenant les généalogies, l'histoire & la chronologie des familles nobles de la France, l'explication de leurs armes et l'état des grandes terres du royaume, possédées à titre de Principautés, Duchés, Marquisats, Comtés, Vicomtés, Baronnies, etc., par création, héritages, alliances, donations, substitutions, mutations, achats ou autrement.

In English, this translates roughly to Dictionary of the nobles; containing the genealogies, history, and timeline of noble families of France; the explanation of their coats of arms, and the state of the domains; those having the titles of Prince, Duke, Marquis, Count, Viscount, Baron, etc., by creation, heritage, alliance, donation, substitution, transfer, sale, or other.

== Bibliography ==
- Estrée, Paul (1897). "Un autre abbé Prévost", pp. 395-404, 465-471, 512-524, in Bulletin du bibliophile et du bibliothécaire.
