= Guignicourt–Rethel railway =

Railway line in France

Coordinates: 49.435833°N 3.966667°E

Guignicourt–Rethel
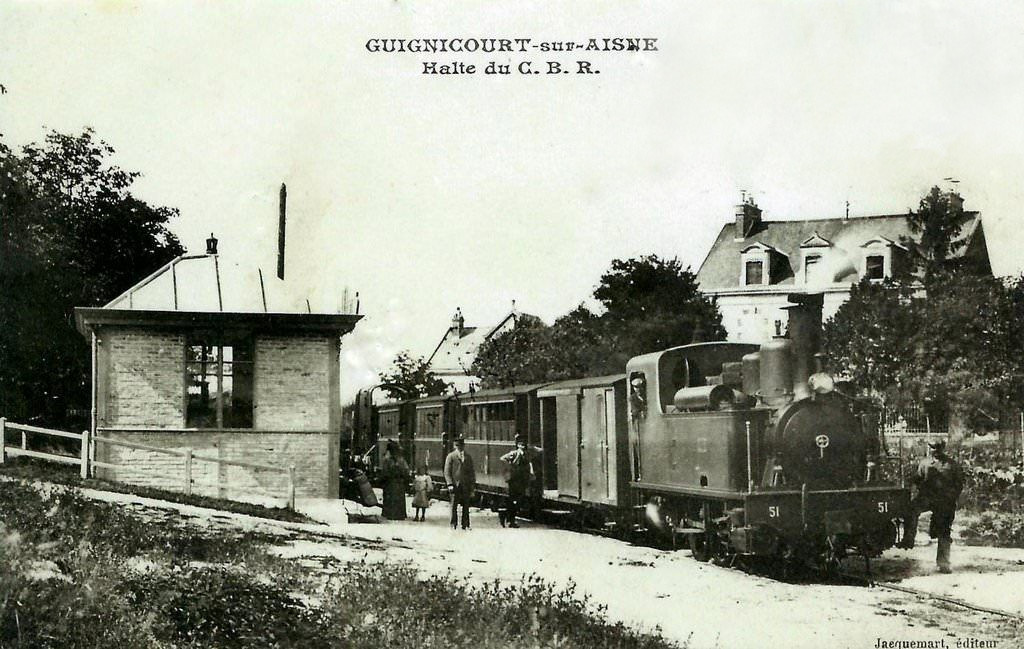
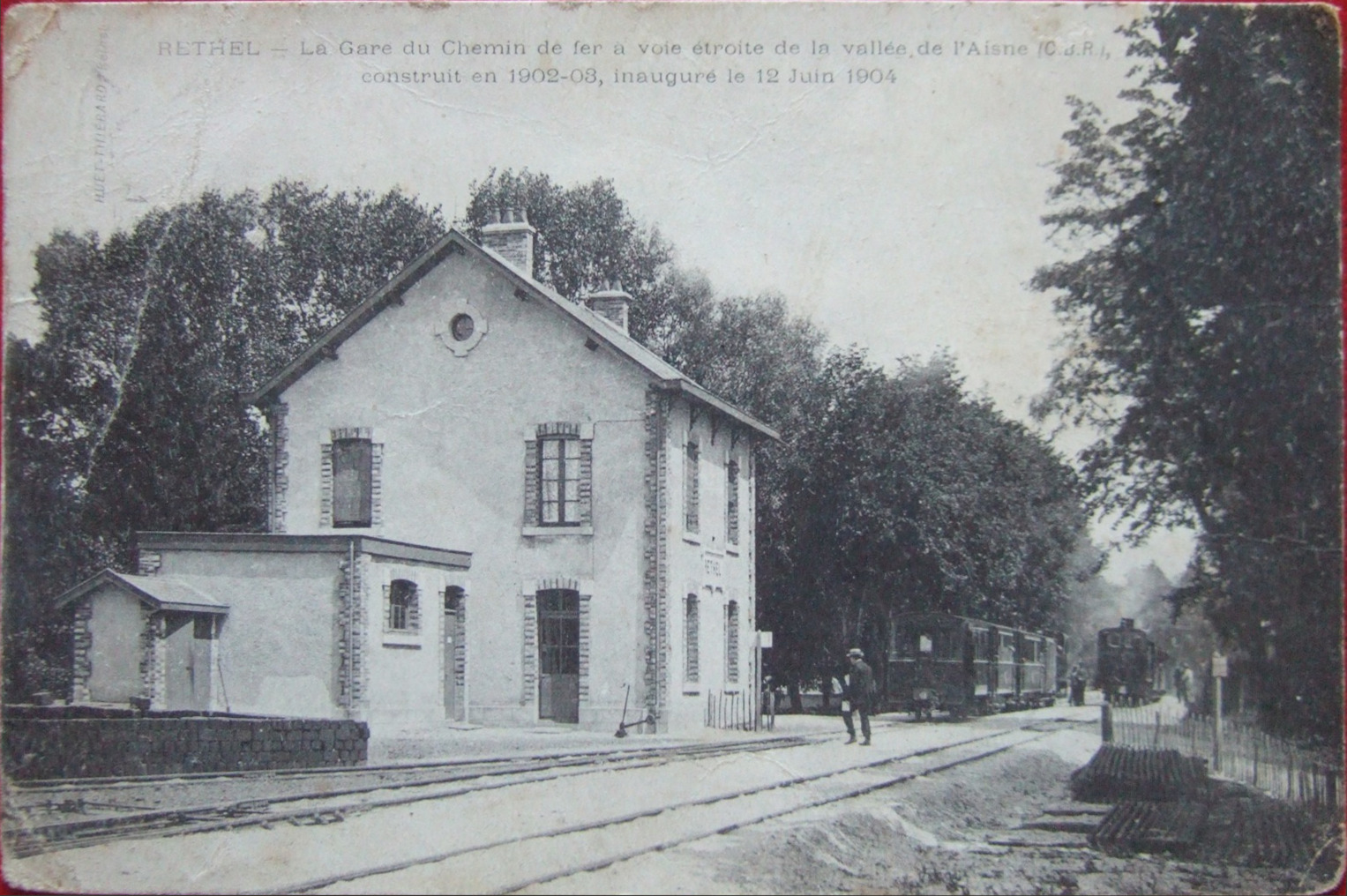
- Guignicourt-sur-Aisne Rethel

Technical
- Line length: 35 km (22 mi)
- Track gauge: 1,000 mm (3 ft 3 3/8 in)

The Guignicourt–Rethel railway was a 35 kilometres (22 miles) long narrow gauge and metre gauge railway in the north of France, commissioned in 1904/05. Three sections were closed in 1940, 1947 and 1961, while the remainder was re-gauged in 1971 and operated as a standard gauge railway until 1987.

== History ==
The Guignicourt–Neufchâtel section of the secondary railway line of the Chemins de fer de la banlieue de Reims with a track gauge of 1000 mm was opened in 1904 and extended to Rethel in 1905.

The Évergnicourt-Vieux-lès-Asfeld section was closed in 1940, the Vieux-lès-Asfeld-Asfeld section in 1947 and the Asfeld-Rethel section finally in 1961. Only the remaining Guignicourt-Evergnicourt section was converted to standard gauge in 1917 and operated until 1987.

== Rail track ==
Vignol rails with a weight per metre of 25 kg/m on wooden sleepers were used for the superstructure of the Rethel-Asfeld line, while Vignol rails with a weight per metre of 22 kg/m on wooden sleepers were used for the neighbouring Asfeld-Dizy metre-gauge line of the Chemins de fer départementaux des Ardennes, which opened in 1909.

== Rolling stock ==
In 1958, the following rolling stock was used on the line by the sugar factory at Acy-Romance:

- Six Corpet-Louvet 1'C 19.5 tonne steam locomotives from the CA (Nos. 61, 71, 77, 79, 81).
- Two Corpet-Louvet steam locomotives C with 18 t from the CBR
- One Corpet-Louvet steam locomotive 1'C with 19.5 t from the CBR
- Two three-axle diesel locomotives with 180 hp Willème engines and Minerva six-speed transmission 0-3-0 with 16 t (no. 651 and 652) and one 0-3-0 with 18 t (no. 301), all formerly Compagnie Générale des Voies Ferrées d'Intérêt Local (VFIL) in Pas-de-Calais
- A light HAWA railcar (Hannoversche Waggonfabrik in Hannover) of the CA.
- Approximately 150 open freight wagons and about 30 closed wagons with an empty weight of 5 to 6 t for 10 t to 15 t load capacity

Some German bogie wagons with an empty weight of 12 t and a carrying capacity of 20 t

== Train stations ==
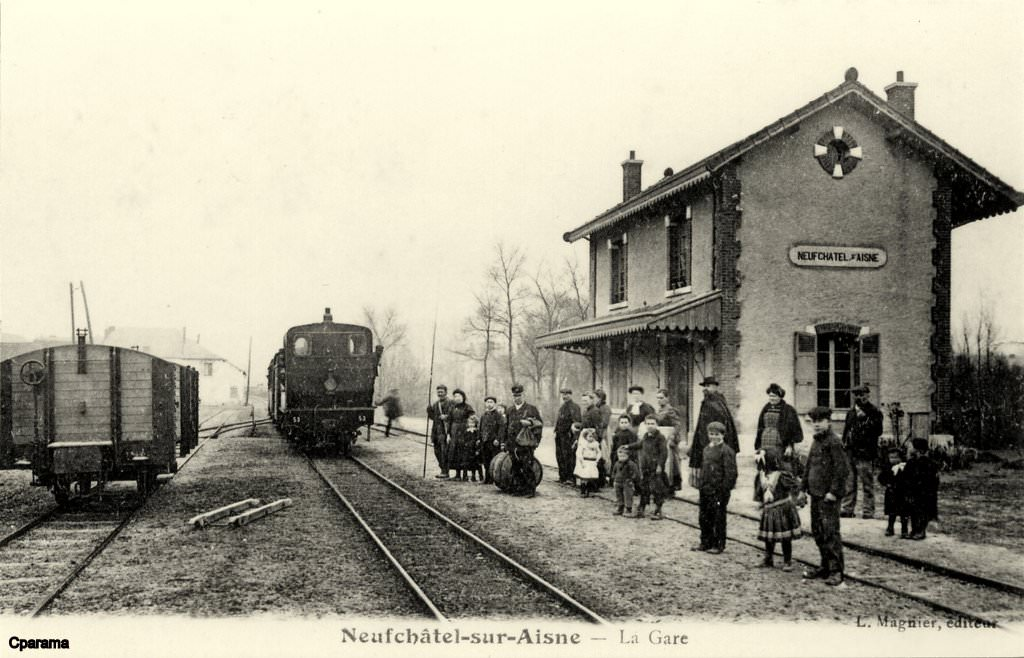
Neufchatel-sur-Aisne

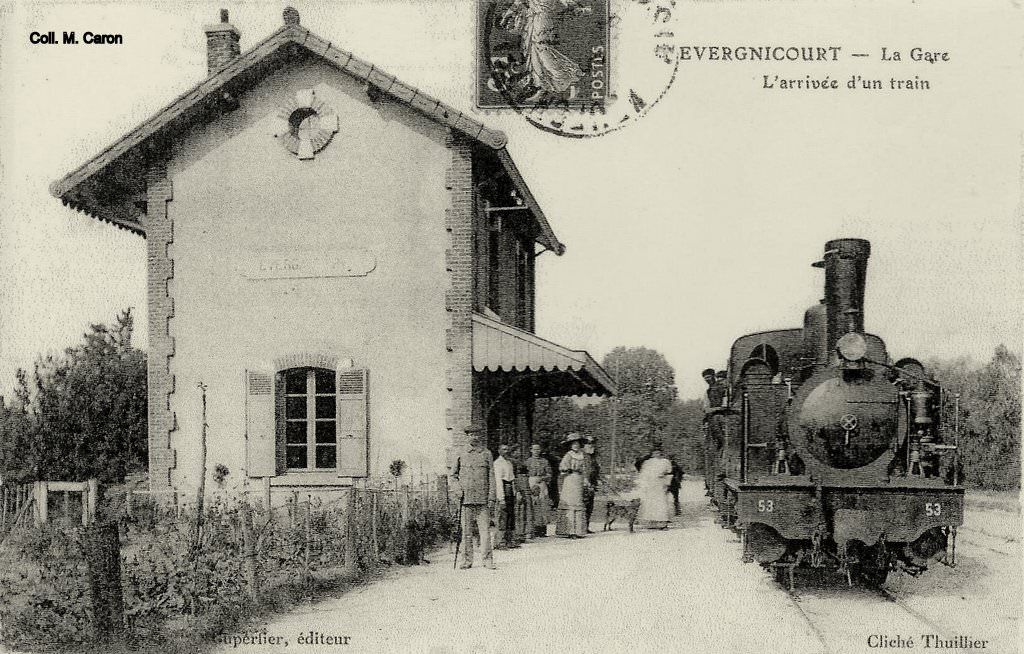
Évergnicourt

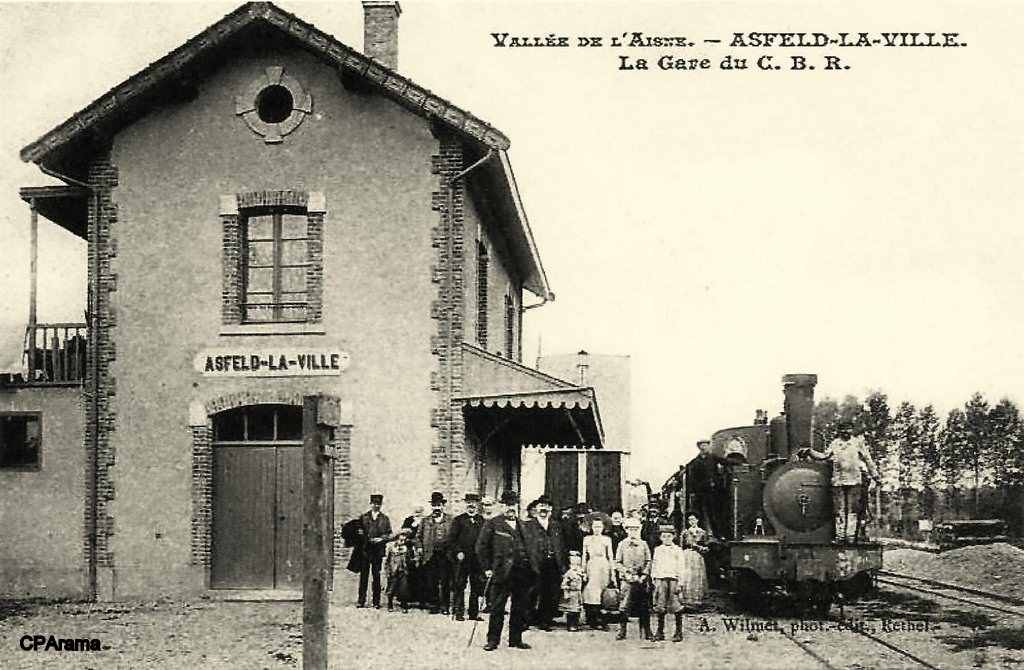
Asfeld-la-Ville
