= Balham, Ardennes =

Balham
- Commune
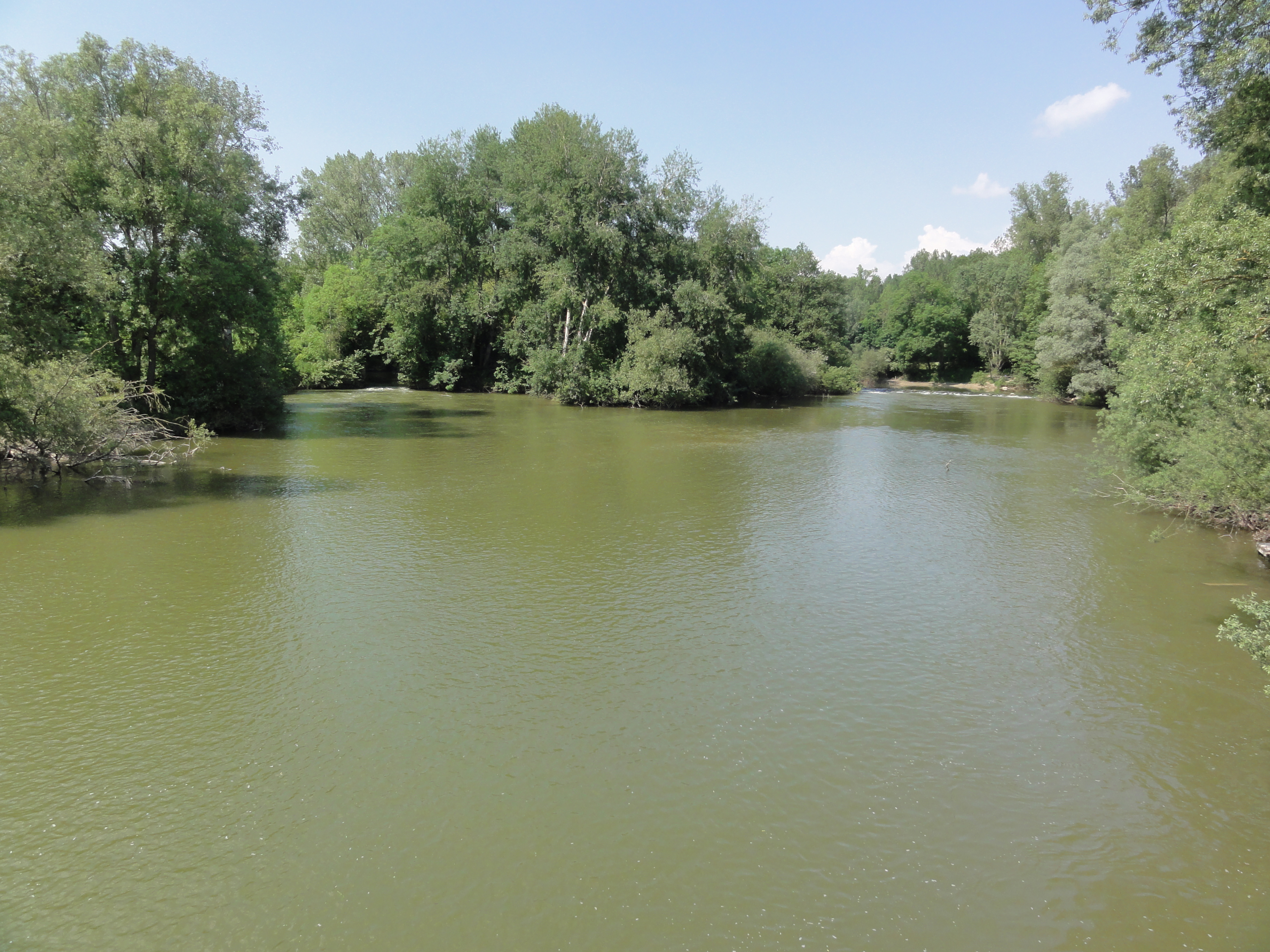
- The Aisne at Balham

- Coat of arms
- Location of Balham
- Location within France Location within Grand Est
- Coordinates: 49°29′34″N 4°09′40″E
- Country: France
- Region: Grand Est
- Department: Ardennes
- Arrondissement: Rethel
- Canton: Château-Porcien
- Intercommunality: Pays Rethélois

Government
  - Mayor (2020–2026): Jean Durand
- Area^{1}: 1.77 km^{2} (0.68 sq mi)
- Elevation: 71 m (233 ft)
- Population (2023): 140
  - Density: 79/km^{2} (200/sq mi)
- Time zone: UTC+01:00 (CET)
  - Summer (DST): UTC+02:00 (CEST)
- INSEE/Postal code: 08044 /08190
- ^{1} French Land Register data, which excludes lakes, ponds, glaciers > 1 km^{2} (0.386 sq mi or 247 acres) and river estuaries.

Balham is a commune in the Ardennes department in the Grand Est region of northern France.

The commune has been awarded one flower by the National Council of Towns and Villages in Bloom in the Competition of cities and villages in Bloom.

== Geography ==
Balham is located some 12 km (7.5 mi) west by south-west of Rethel and 3 km (1.9 mi) north-east of Asfeld. Access to the commune is by the D926 road from Gomont in the north-east which passes through the village and continues south-west to Asfeld. The commune is mixed forest and farmland.

The Aisne river passes through the centre of the commune flowing from north-east to south-west on its way to join the Oise at Compiègne. The parallel Canal des Ardennes passes through the southern tip of the commune.

== Toponymy ==
The name Balham comes from the name of a person Ballo + Heim. It was Balaan around 1172 and Balehan in 1211–1212.

=== Heraldry ===
Arms of Balham	Blazon: Azure, a chevron of Or between three acorns the same, in chief also Or charged with two mullets of Gules.

== Administration ==
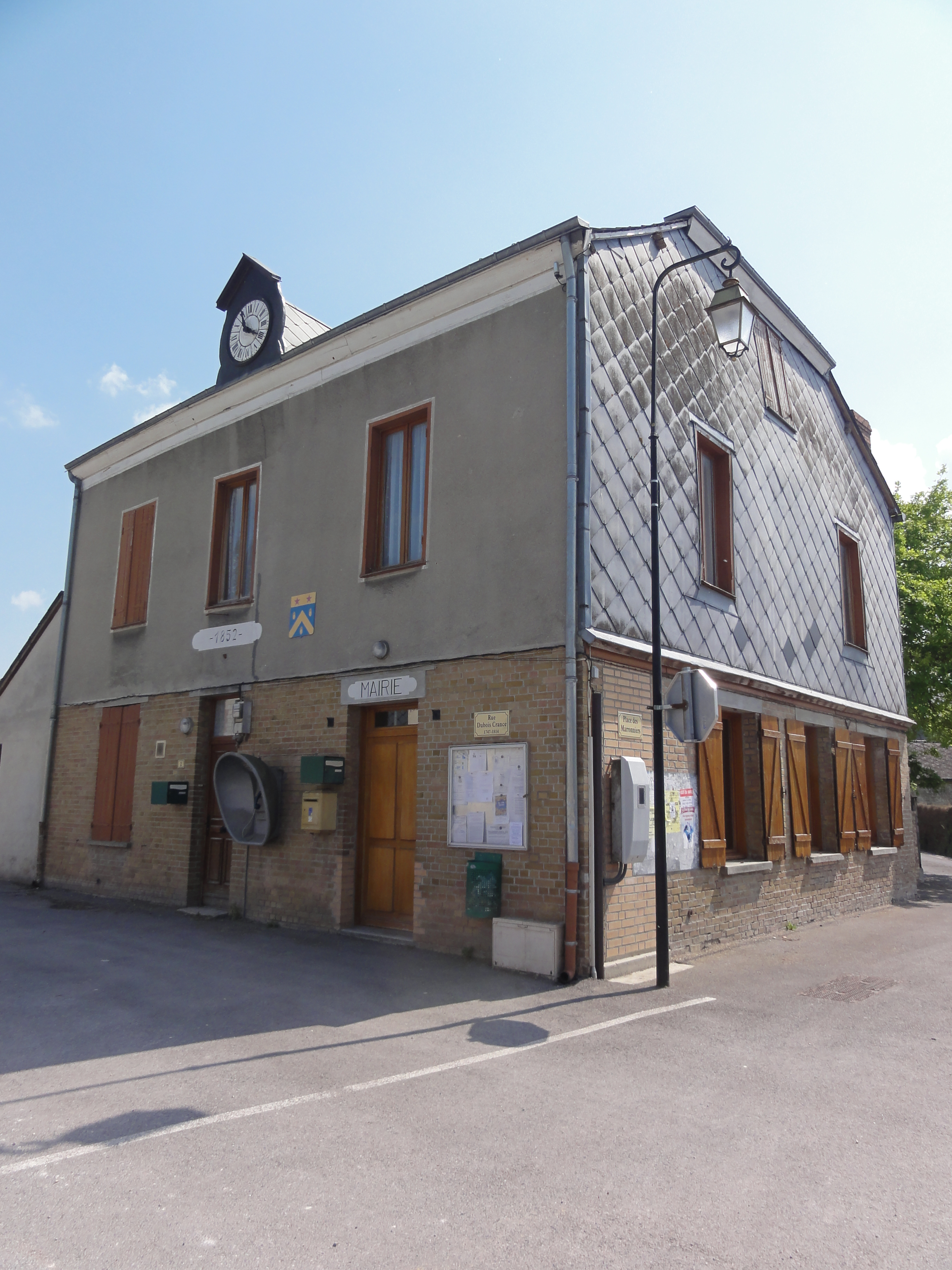
The Town Hall

List of Successive Mayors

From	To	Name
1995	2008	Jean-Pierre Moraux
2008	2020	Vincent Roland
2020	current	Jean Durand

== Demography ==
The inhabitants of the commune are known as Balhamais or Balhamaises in French.

Historical population

Year	Pop.	±% p.a.
1793	259	—
1821	314	+0.69%
1846	317	+0.04%
1872	292	−0.32%
1901	205	−1.21%
1926	193	−0.24%
1946	132	−1.88%
1962	131	−0.05%
1968	114	−2.29%

Year	Pop.	±% p.a.
1975	115	+0.12%
1982	95	−2.69%
1990	103	+1.02%
1999	125	+2.17%
2007	136	+1.06%
2012	121	−2.31%
2017	152	+4.67%
2023	140	−1.36%

Source: EHESS and INSEE

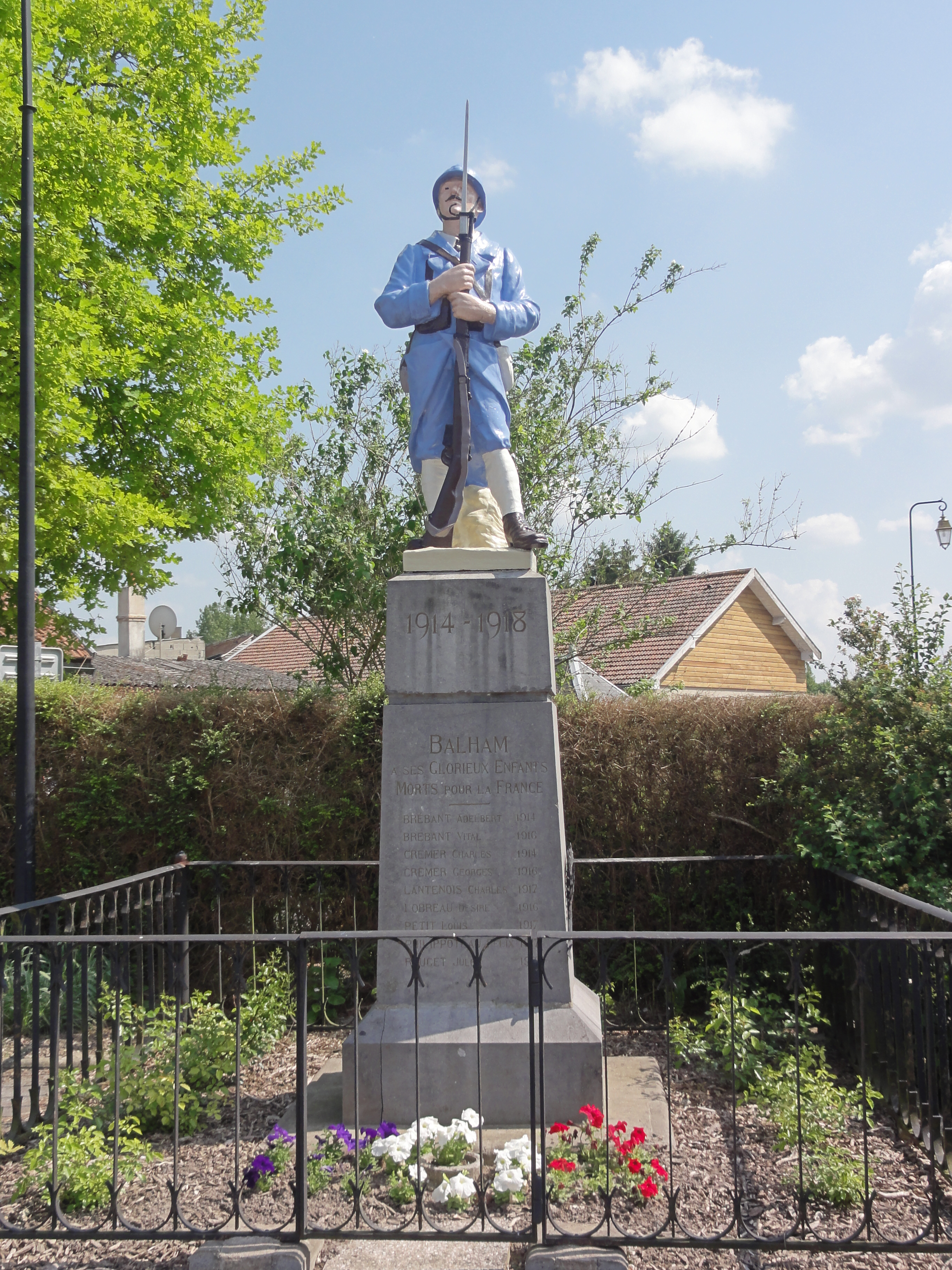
The War Memorial

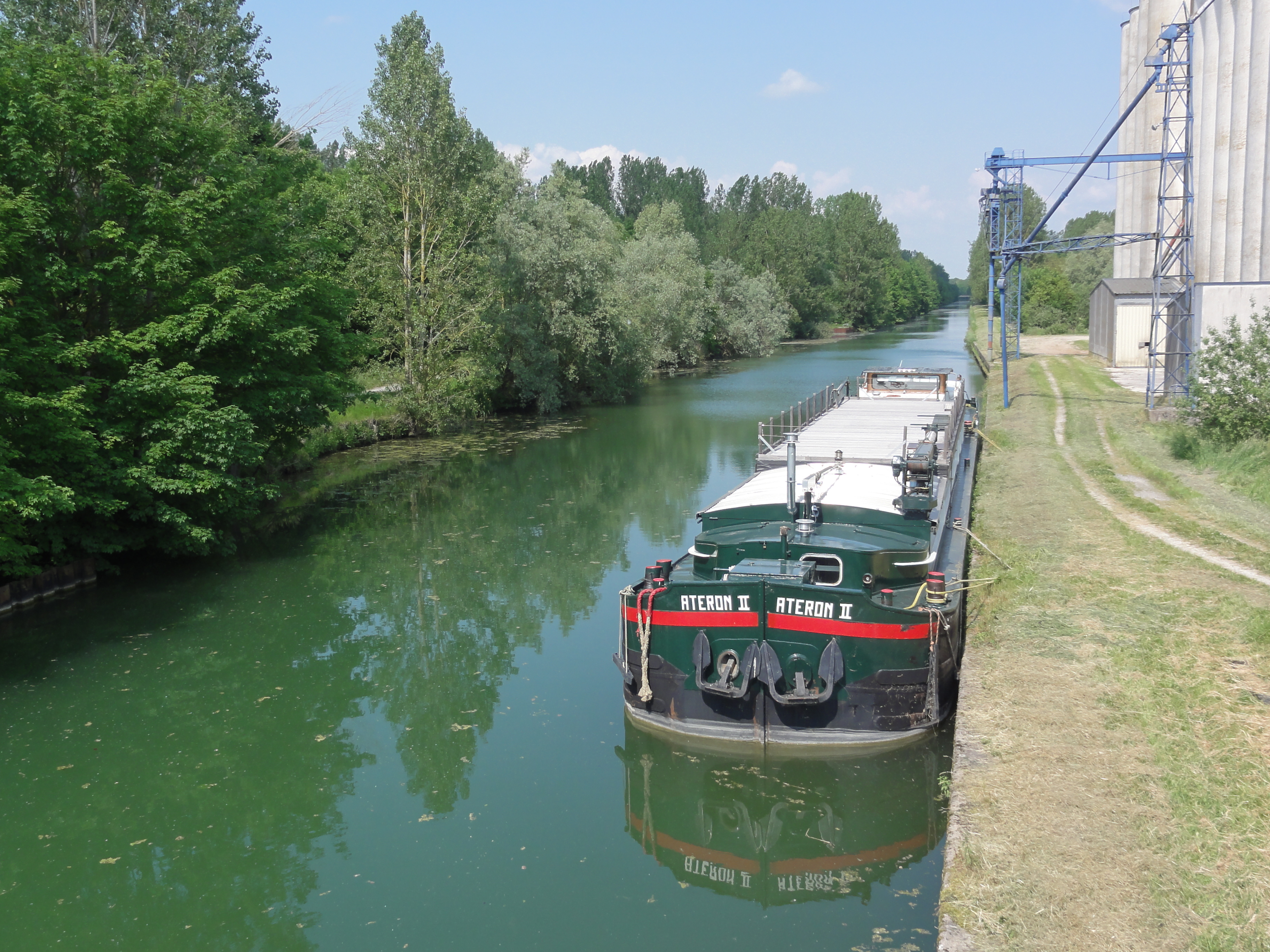
The Canal des Ardennes at Balham

== Sites and monuments ==
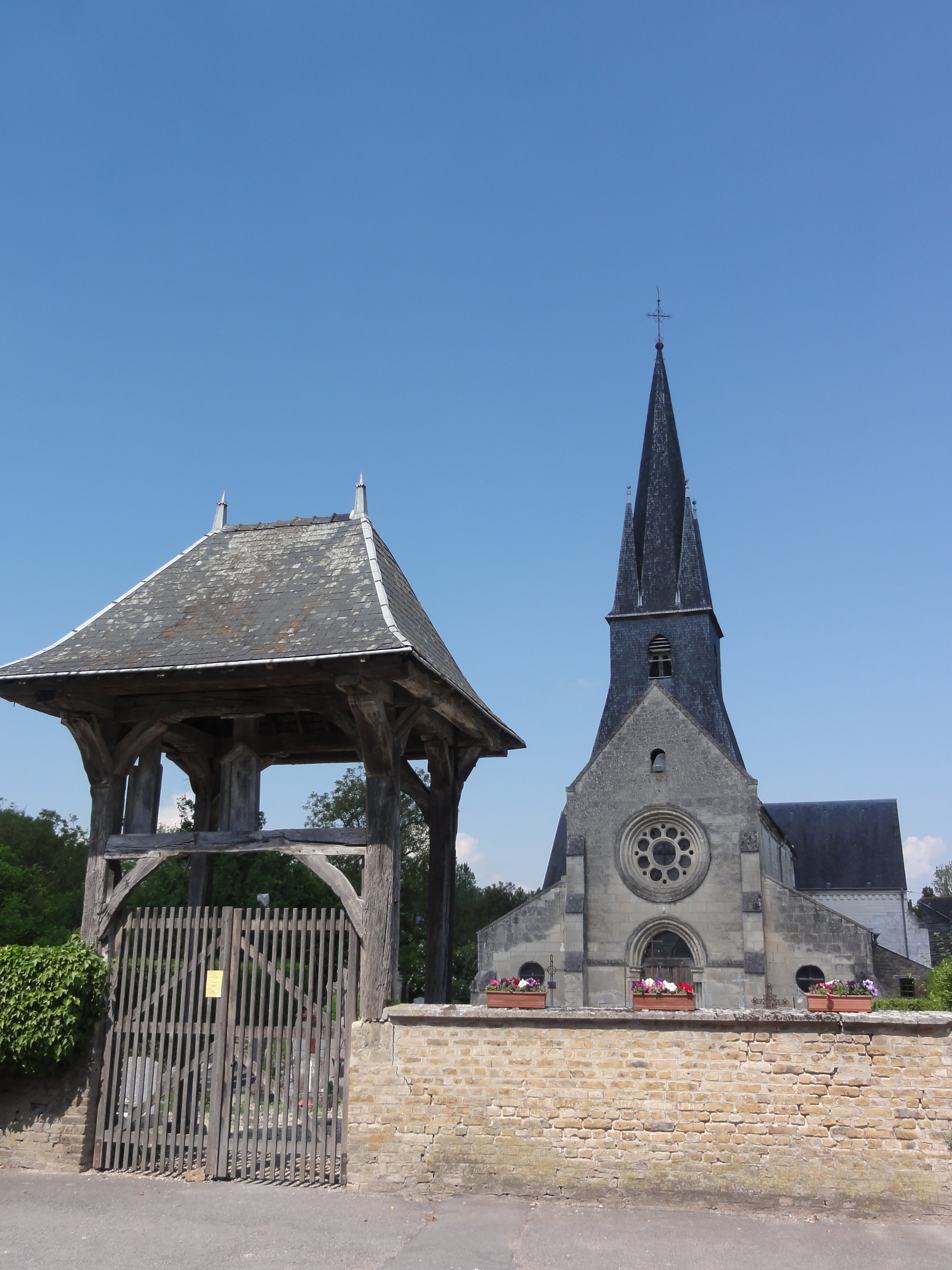
The Church with the door to the Cemetery

- The Cemetery (15th century) is registered as an historical monument.
- The Church of Saint John the Baptist contains several items that are registered as historical objects:
  - A Stained glass window (1536)
  - A Statue: Saint Barbe (15th century)
  - A Statue: Saint Catherine (15th century)

== Notable people linked to the commune ==
- Edmond Louis Alexis Dubois-Crancé (1747-1814), Revolutionary politician, member of the Committee of Public Order, General of the Republic, Commissioner of the Army and Minister of War (September–November 1799), became Mayor of Balham after 1800.

== See also ==
- Communes of the Ardennes department
