= Juzancourt =

Coordinates: 49.4894°N 4.1133°E

Juzancourt (French pronunciation: [ʒyzɑ̃kuʁ]) is an old municipality in the French departement of Ardennes, absorbed since le 1 January 1971, by the municipality of Asfeld.
