= Asfeld-Montcornet railway =

Railway line in France

Coordinates: 49.46848°N 4.11163°E

Asfeld–Montcornet
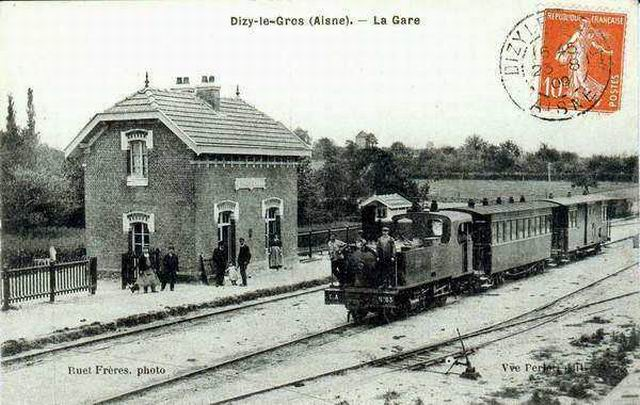
- Dizy-le-Gros train station

Technical
- Line length: 44 km (27 mi)
- Track gauge: 1,000 mm (3 ft 3 3/8 in)

The Asfeld-Montcornet railway was a 44 kilometres (27 miles) long, metre gauge railway in northeastern France, commissioned in 1909 and operated until 1957.

== Route of the line ==
22 km of the line ran in the département of Ardennes and 22 km in the département of Aisne.

== History ==
The Asfeld-Montcornet metre-gauge railway was built by the Chemins de fer départementaux des Ardennes in 1909 and operated until 1957. During the harvest season in the summer of 1914, eight regular trains ran daily on the Asfeld-Montcornet line for the transport of sugar beet.[3] The line was used for the transport of sugar beet.

== Stations ==
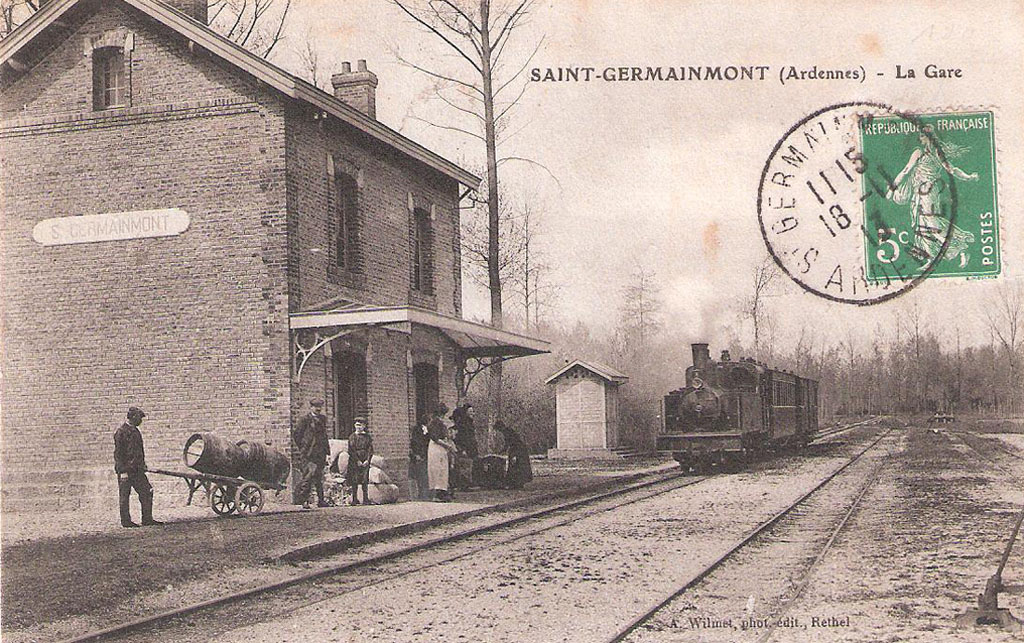
Saint-Germainmont

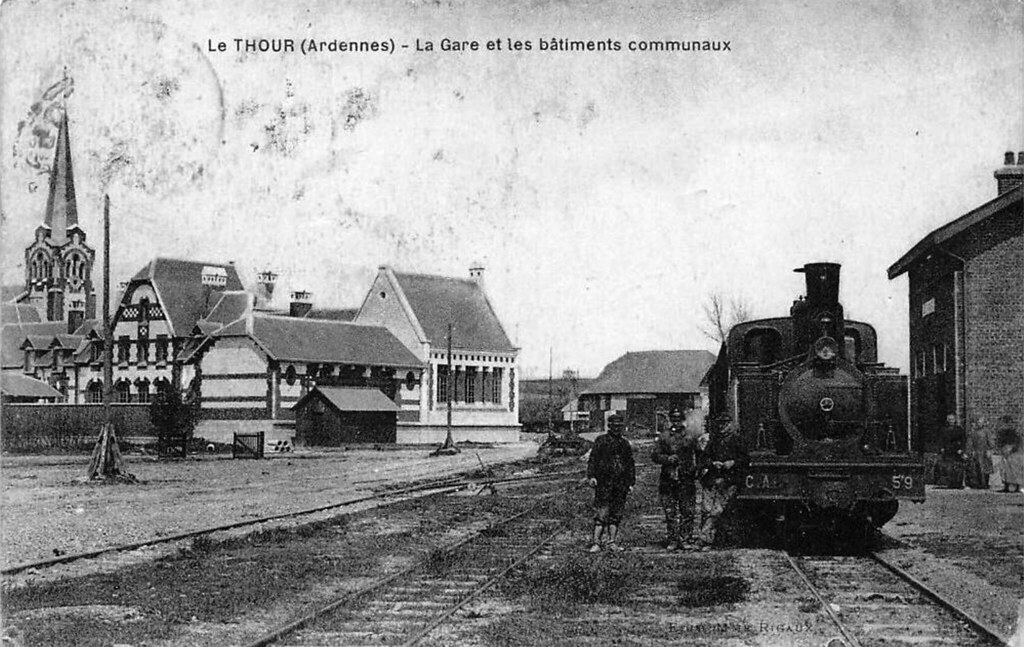
Le Thour

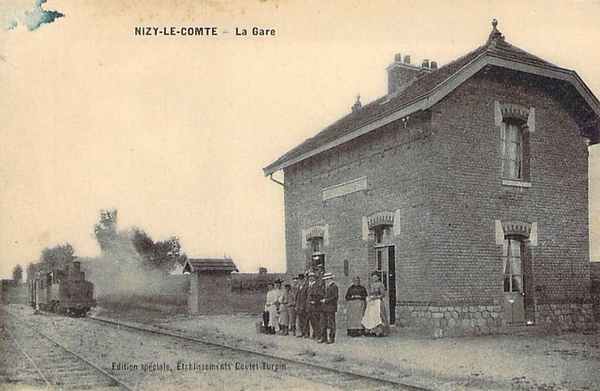
Nizy-le-Comte

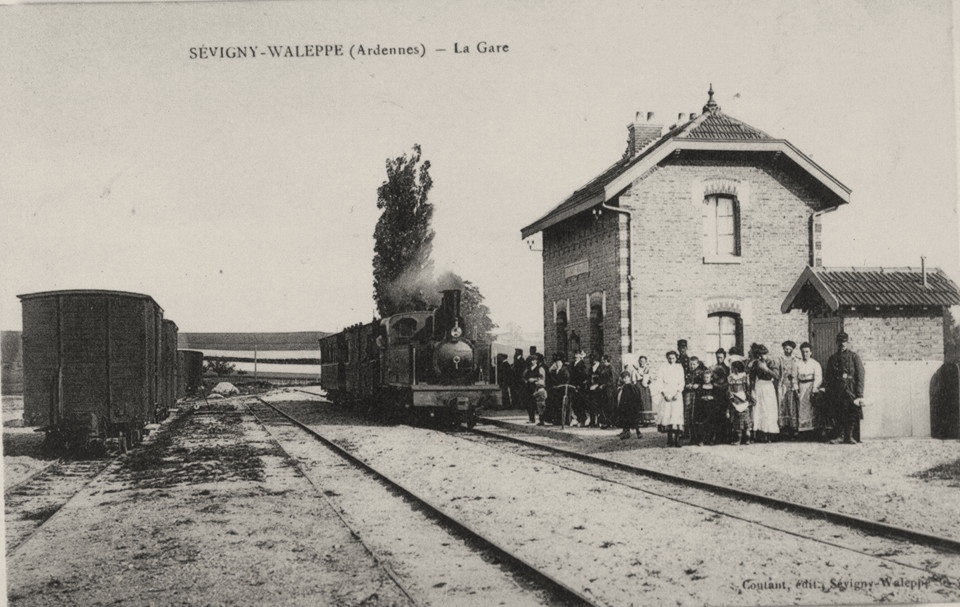
Sévigny-Waleppe

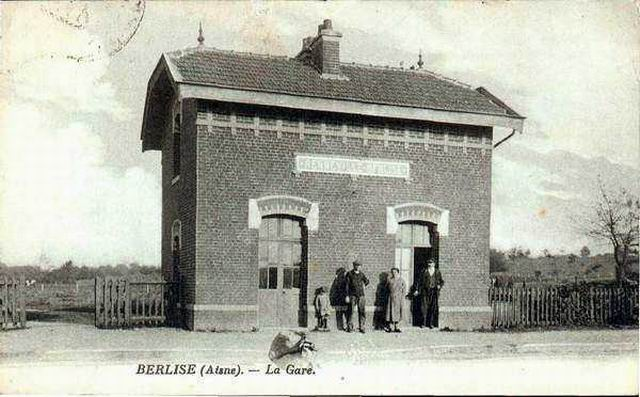
Berlise

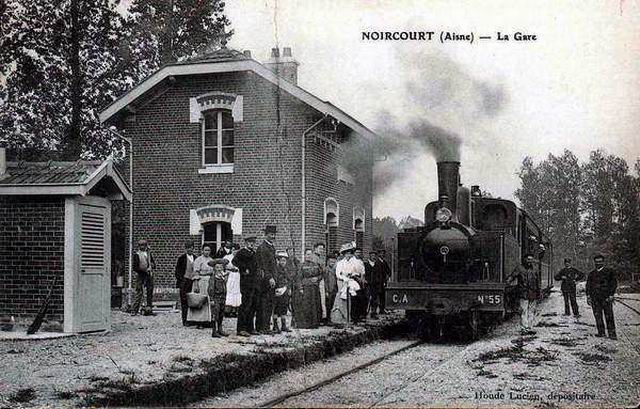
Noircourt

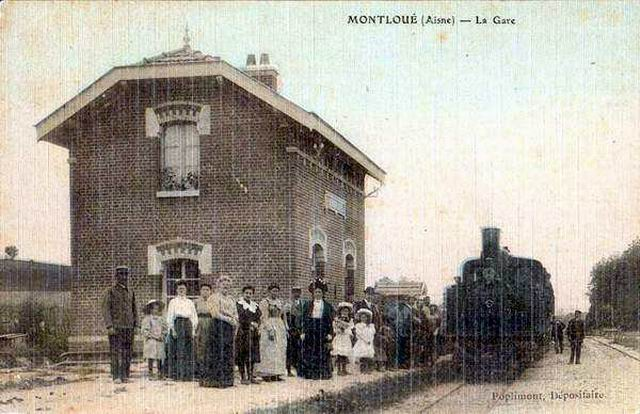
Montloué

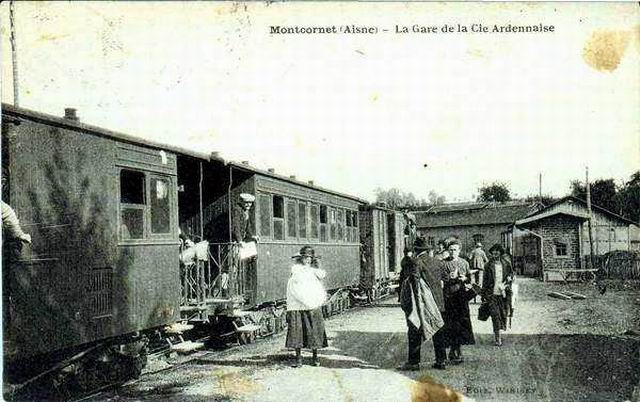
Montcornet
