= Villers-devant-le-Thour =

- Commune
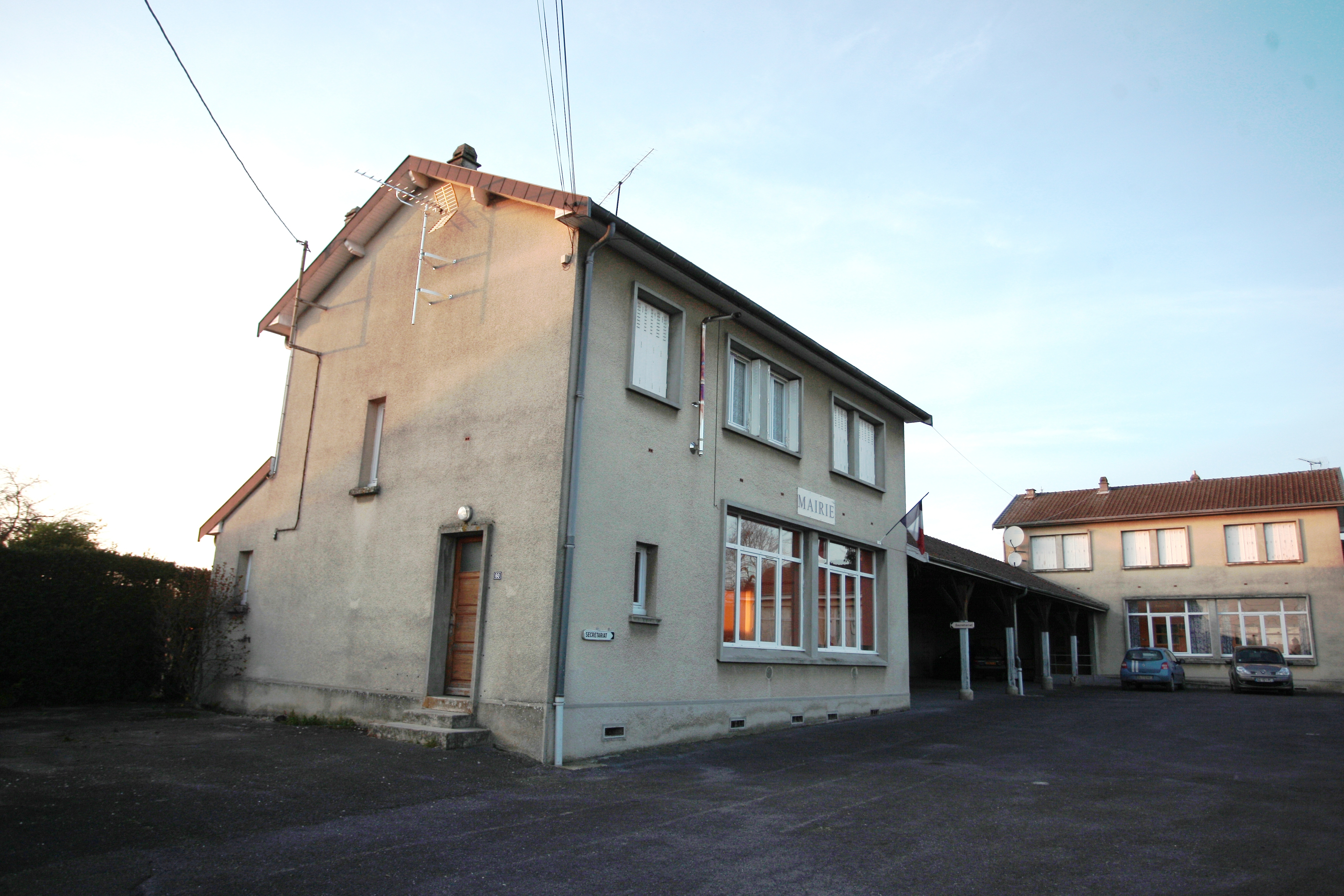
- Town hall
- Location of Villers-devant-le-Thour
- Location within France Location within Grand Est
- Coordinates: 49°30′29″N 4°05′13″E
- Country: France
- Region: Grand Est
- Department: Ardennes
- Arrondissement: Rethel
- Canton: Château-Porcien

Government
  - Mayor (2021–2026): Amandine Charles
- Area^{1}: 16.41 km^{2} (6.34 sq mi)
- Elevation: 90 m (300 ft)
- Population (2023): 414
  - Density: 25.2/km^{2} (65.3/sq mi)
- Time zone: UTC+01:00 (CET)
  - Summer (DST): UTC+02:00 (CEST)
- INSEE/Postal code: 08476 /08190
- ^{1} French Land Register data, which excludes lakes, ponds, glaciers > 1 km^{2} (0.386 sq mi or 247 acres) and river estuaries.

Villers-devant-le-Thour is a commune in the Ardennes department in northern France.

== Population ==
Historical population
Year	Pop.	±% p.a.
1968	369	—
1975	323	−1.88%
1982	351	+1.19%
1990	325	−0.96%
1999	301	−0.85%
2007	329	+1.12%
2012	402	+4.09%
2017	419	+0.83%
2023	414	−0.20%
Source: INSEE

== See also ==
- Communes of the Ardennes department
