= Gomont =

- Commune
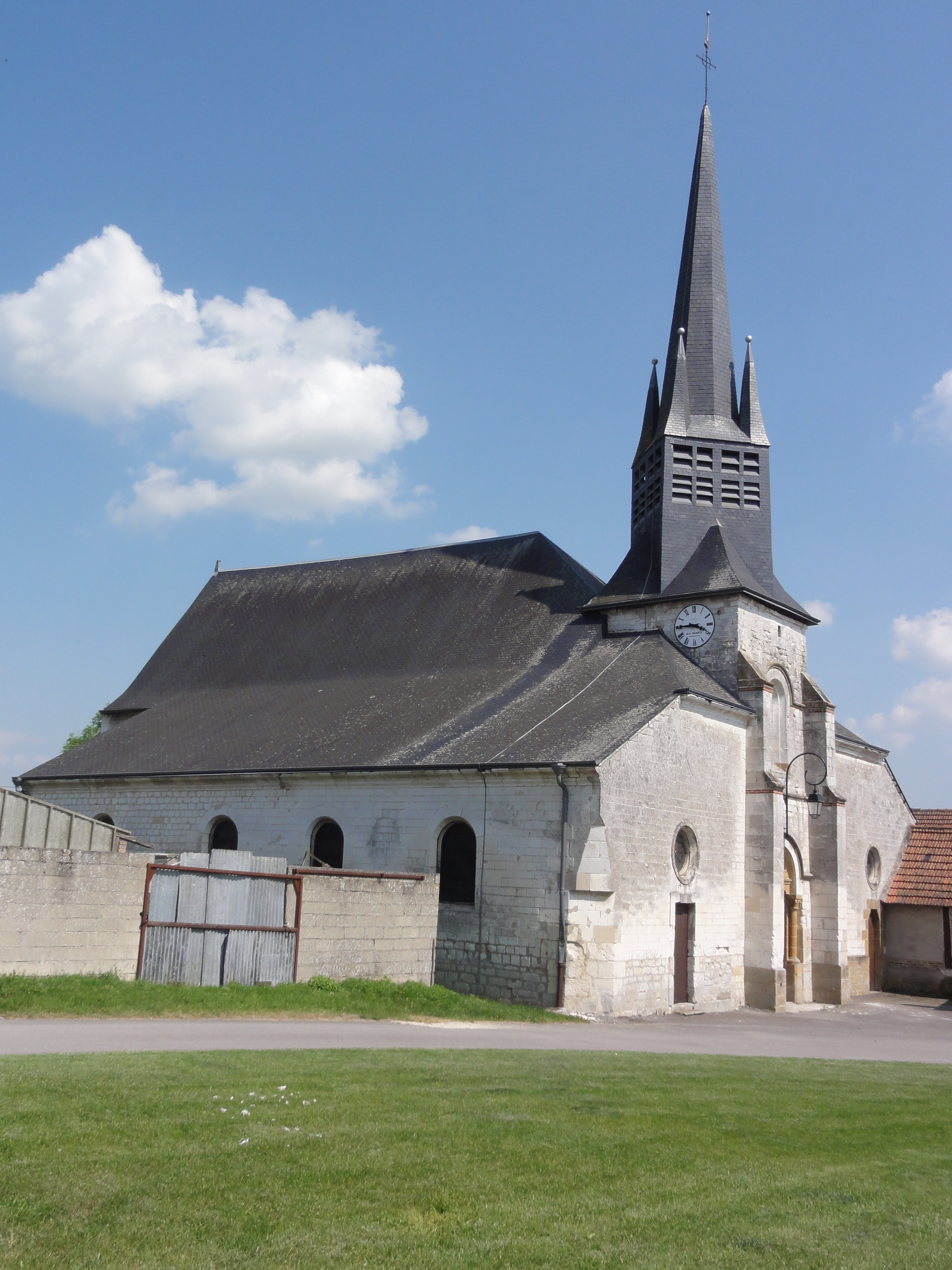
- The church in Gomont

- Coat of arms
- Location of Gomont
- Location within France Location within Grand Est
- Coordinates: 49°30′04″N 4°09′45″E
- Country: France
- Region: Grand Est
- Department: Ardennes
- Arrondissement: Rethel
- Canton: Château-Porcien

Government
  - Mayor (2020–2026): Jean Luc Rousseau
- Area^{1}: 7.23 km^{2} (2.79 sq mi)
- Elevation: 93 m (305 ft)
- Population (2023): 317
  - Density: 43.8/km^{2} (114/sq mi)
- Time zone: UTC+01:00 (CET)
  - Summer (DST): UTC+02:00 (CEST)
- INSEE/Postal code: 08195 /08190
- ^{1} French Land Register data, which excludes lakes, ponds, glaciers > 1 km^{2} (0.386 sq mi or 247 acres) and river estuaries.

Gomont (French pronunciation: [ɡɔmɔ̃]) is a commune in the Ardennes department in northern France.

== Population ==
Historical population
Year	Pop.	±% p.a.
1968	394	—
1975	342	−2.00%
1982	309	−1.44%
1990	292	−0.70%
1999	320	+1.02%
2007	314	−0.24%
2012	357	+2.60%
2017	326	−1.80%
2023	317	−0.47%
Source: INSEE

== See also ==
- Communes of the Ardennes department
