= Asfeld =

- Commune
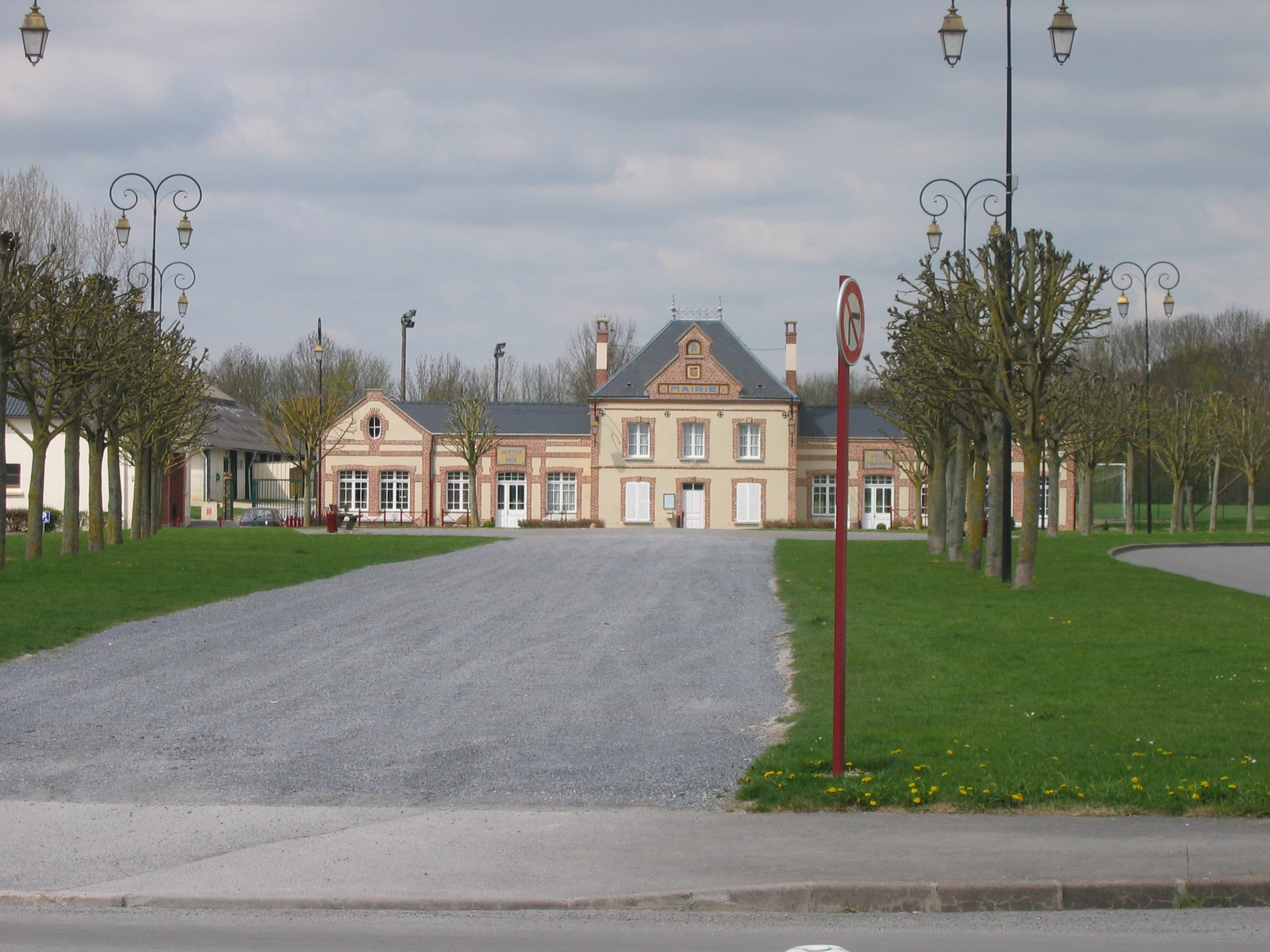
- Town hall and square

- Coat of arms
- Location of Asfeld
- Location within France Location within Grand Est
- Coordinates: 49°28′11″N 4°07′09″E
- Country: France
- Region: Grand Est
- Department: Ardennes
- Arrondissement: Rethel
- Canton: Château-Porcien
- Intercommunality: CC Pays Rethélois

Government
  - Mayor (2020–2026): Aline Beaujard
- Area^{1}: 22.191 km^{2} (8.568 sq mi)
- Highest elevation: 118 m (387 ft)
- Lowest elevation: 60 m (200 ft)
- Population (2023): 1,082
  - Density: 48.76/km^{2} (126.3/sq mi)
- Time zone: UTC+01:00 (CET)
  - Summer (DST): UTC+02:00 (CEST)
- INSEE/Postal code: 08024 /08190
- ^{1} French Land Register data, which excludes lakes, ponds, glaciers > 1 km^{2} (0.386 sq mi or 247 acres) and river estuaries.

Asfeld (French pronunciation: [asfɛld]) is a commune in the Ardennes department in the Grand Est region of north-eastern France, formerly named Ecry or Ecri.

The commune has been awarded one flower by the National Council of Towns and Villages in Bloom in the Competition of cities and villages in Bloom.

== Geography ==
Asfeld is located some 35 km east by south-east of Laon and 8 km north-east of Neufchâtel-sur-Aisne. Access to the commune is by road D 926 from Vieux-lès-Asfeld in the south-west passing through the town and continuing north-east to Aire. The D 37 also goes from the town north-west to Villers-devant-le-Thour. The D 18 from Villers-devant-le-Thour to the D 926 north of Balham passes through the north-east corner of the commune. The D 137 road branches off the D 18 in the commune and goes south-west to Avaux. The D 237 goes from the town south-east to Roizy. Apart from the town there is also the village of Juzancourt in the north of the commune. The commune is mainly farmland with some forested areas near the river and in the north.

The river Aisne passes through the commune from east to west forming a part of the eastern border and continuing south-west to eventually join the Oise at Compiègne. The Canal des Ardennes also passes through the commune parallel to the Aisne. The Ruisseau des Barres forms the eastern border of the commune as it flows south to join the Aisne.

== History ==
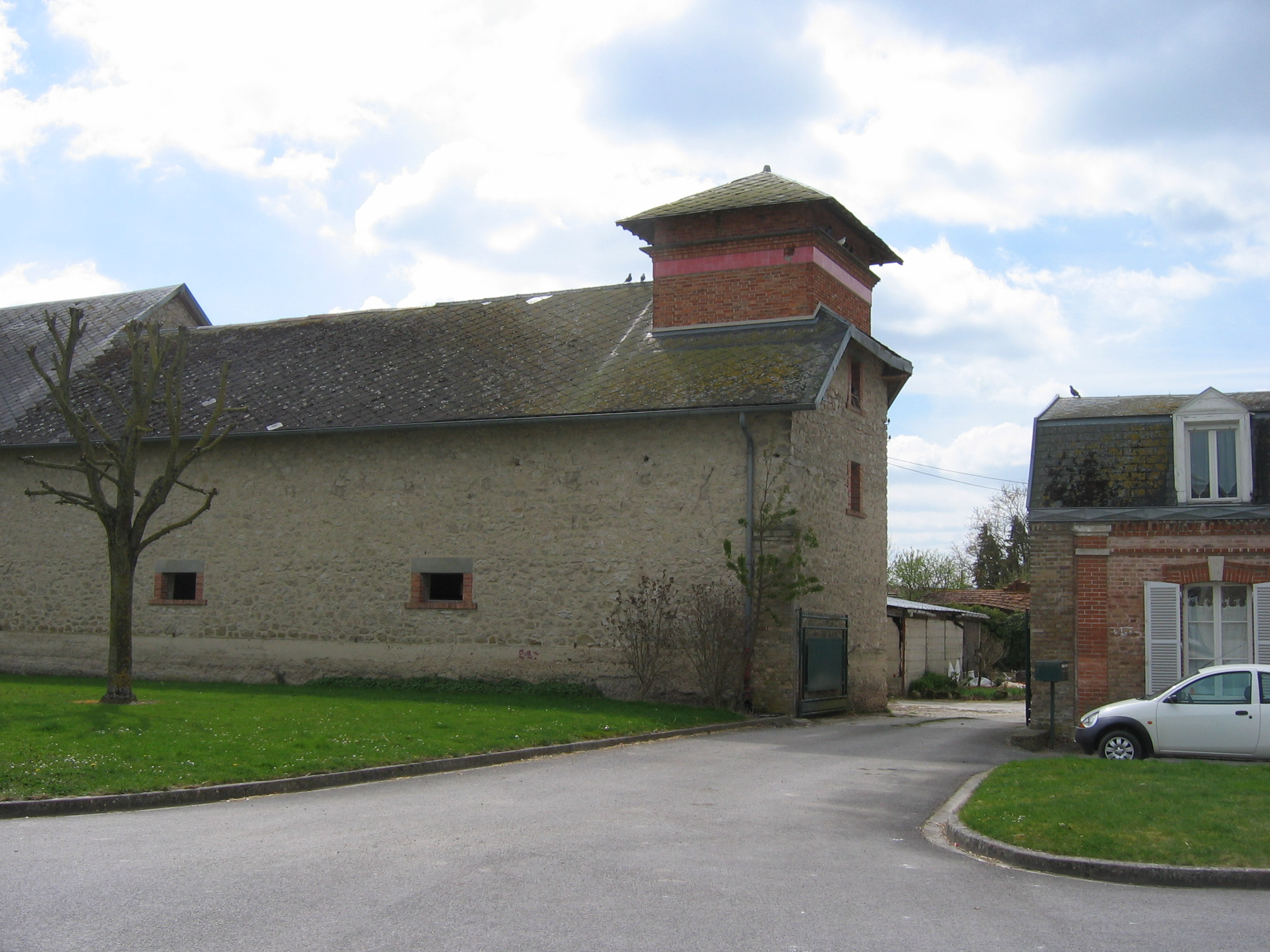
Farm in the centre of the commune

=== A fortified point beside the Aisne ===
Asfeld was a village formerly called Ecry where the Vikings were defeated in 883.

On 28 November 1199 a tournament was held in Ecry, in which several of Pope Innocent III's papal legates recruited Theobald III, Count of Champagne, the tournament host, Louis of Blois, Simon de Montfort, 5th Earl of Leicester and Reynald of Montmirail for the Fourth Crusade. Historians have debated whether one of the Pope's most controversial papal legates Fulk of Neuilly was one of the aforementioned recruiters.

In the Middle Ages, the Lords of Escry built a fortified residence. It was passed to the Grandpré family then to the Bossut. The chateau suffered numerous assaults: in 1359 it was sacked by the troops of Edward III riding from Calais to Reims then again by the Burgundians around 1425.

In 1625 it was again attacked by Charles IV, Duke of Lorraine, profiting from the Fronde to plunder Champagne and threaten Île-de-France.

In 1671, Jean-Jacques de Mesmes, Count of Avaux bought the fief of Ecry after it had been devastated by these successive invasions to complete his territory. The main town of Ecry was then renamed Avaux-la-ville.

=== From Avaux-la-Ville to Asfeld ===
Jean-Jacques de Mesmes stimulated the local economy by establishing a weekly market and two annual fairs. He strengthened and enlarged the chateau and its approaches.

In 1680 he decided to build a new church as the existing church was in a particularly bad state. This construction was part of an overall plan for the surroundings of the château. The new church building was blessed on 15 June 1685.

On 20 March 1728 Claude François Bidal d'Asfeld bought the County of Avaux which was created from Avaux-le-Château, Avaux-la-Ville, Aire, Vieux, and Vauboison. In 1730 this lordship was raised to a marquisate. Avaux-la-Ville, which had been called Ecry until 1671, again changed its name and took the current name of Asfeld.

Claude François Bidal Asfeld was Lieutenant-General of the armies (equivalent to General of division of the King and Director-general of fortifications, succeeding to this function from Vauban.

At the same time, Nicolas Bidet from Reims, a winemaker and author of a botanical treatise on the nature and the culture of grapevines, became Lord of Juzancourt, now a hamlet in Asfeld commune.

=== Revolutions and political upheavals ===
The son of Claude François Bidal d'Asfeld, Claude Étienne, the second Marquis of Asfeld lived mainly in Paris but had strong relationships with the inhabitants of Asfeld. The French Revolution of 1789 accentuated the conflicts.

The gates of the château were forced open on 13 June 1790. The Marquis of Asfeld condemned the leaders but on 25 August 1792, hearing of the fall of the monarchy, mobs again entered the property of the Marquis and symbolically burned his Charter. The Marquis preferred to emigrate to Aachen following the French Revolution. His assets were seized and sold as Biens nationaux (national property). The castle was demolished the following year. The church was spared.

During the Revolution the commune took the name of Écry-le-Franc or Escry-le-Franc.

In 1814, during the Battle for France, the region of Berry-au-Bac in Asfeld was the scene of fighting between Field Marshal Blücher, the Duke of Ragusa, and General Ricard.

In February 1848 a native of Asfeld, the botanist Jean-Baptiste Payer, participated in the revolutionary events in Paris, became Chief of staff for Lamartine then enjoyed a burgeoning popularity in his native region and was elected MP for Ardennes in the French Second Republic although it was ephemeral.

At the end of the 19th century and beginning of the 20th century the construction of railways was encouraged by freight traffic from the sugar beet industry. Spurred by the brothers Jules and Désiré Linard, the railway was quickly built and created potential for further diversification for farmers.

=== Conflicts of the 20th century ===
Throughout the 1914-1918 war the area was close to combat zones until the final days and suffered extensive damage. In 1940 after the breakthrough at Sedan in May, it was along the Aisne and in particular at Asfeld that a line of defence against the German invasion was attempted to be organized in early June without much success. In the years that followed, resistance movements emerge, such as the FTP.

=== Heraldry ===
Arms of Asfeld	The official status of the blazon remains to be determined Blazon: Quarterly, at 1 and 4 Gules, with a bend of Azure charged with three antique crowns of 3 points of Or between two palm branches the same; at 2 and 3 a lion issuant of Argent crowned the same, that at 3 counter-rampant; over all an inescutcheon of Or with four pales of Gules, the inescutcheon crowned with a Ducal crown of Or with a crest of a griffin issuant the same.

The Croix de guerre 1914-1918 was awarded to the commune on 17 September 1921.

== Administration ==
List of Successive Mayors

From	To	Name
2001	2020	Jean-Marc Briois
2020	current	Aline Beaujard

== Demography ==
The inhabitants of the commune are known as Asfeldois in French.

Historical population

Year	Pop.	±% p.a.
1793	947	—
1800	1,056	+1.57%
1806	1,084	+0.44%
1821	1,121	+0.22%
1831	1,248	+1.08%
1836	1,284	+0.57%
1841	1,221	−1.00%
1846	1,220	−0.02%
1851	1,238	+0.29%
1866	1,151	−0.48%
1872	1,102	−0.72%
1876	1,057	−1.04%
1881	1,078	+0.39%
1886	961	−2.27%
1891	965	+0.08%
1896	950	−0.31%
1901	913	−0.79%
1906	932	+0.41%

Year	Pop.	±% p.a.
1911	907	−0.54%
1921	1,020	+1.18%
1926	849	−3.60%
1931	840	−0.21%
1936	812	−0.68%
1946	772	−0.50%
1954	812	+0.63%
1962	843	+0.47%
1968	803	−0.81%
1975	926	+2.06%
1982	1,015	+1.32%
1990	1,061	+0.56%
1999	976	−0.92%
2007	999	+0.29%
2012	1,104	+2.02%
2017	1,116	+0.22%
2023	1,082	−0.51%

Source: EHESS and INSEE

== Culture and heritage ==
Asfeld is a stage on the Route de Porcien, a tourist route promoted by the Tourism Office of Ardennes

== Civil heritage ==
- The former Arlot Flour Mill (17th century)
- The German War cemetery
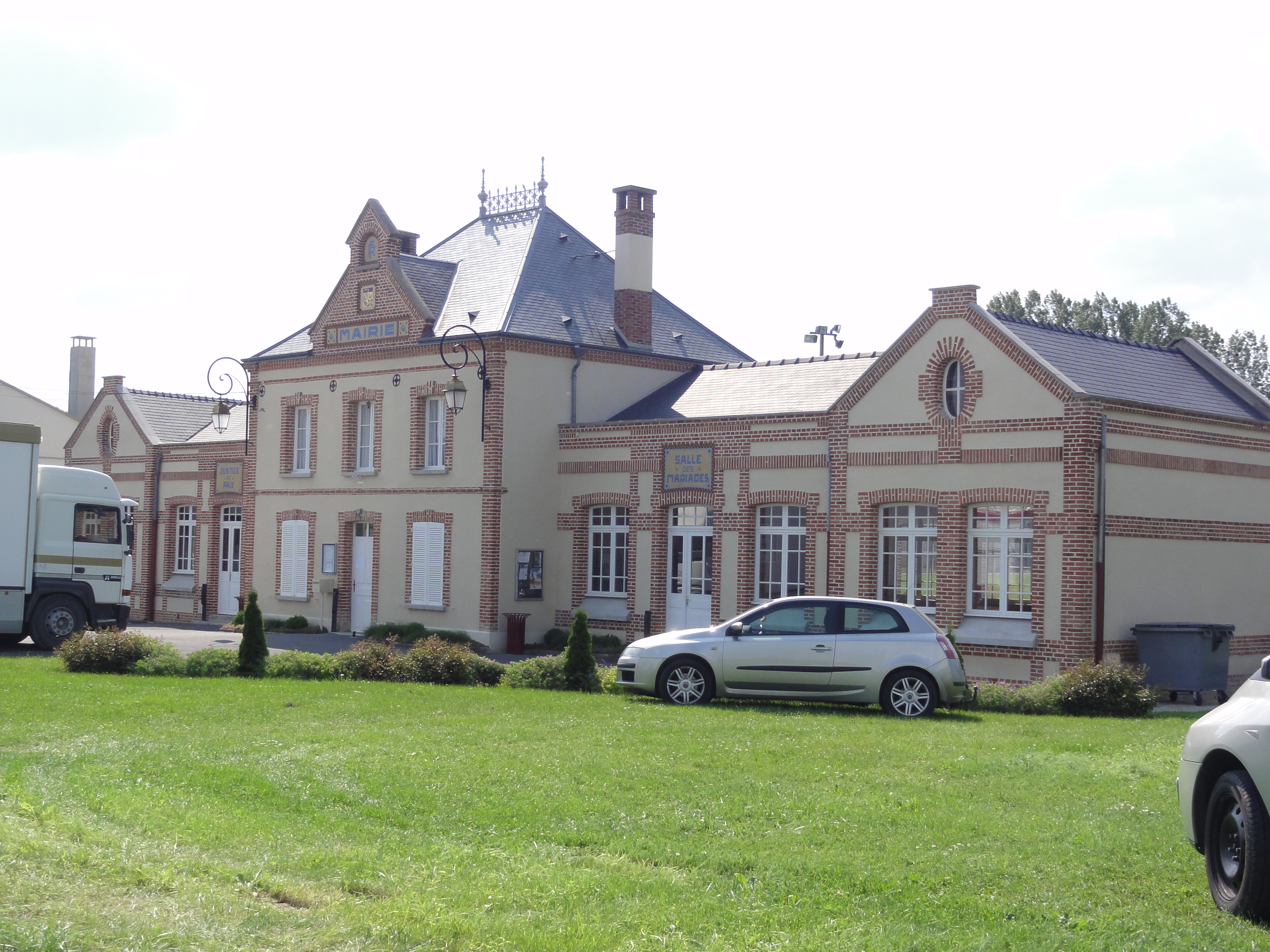
Asfeld Town Hall

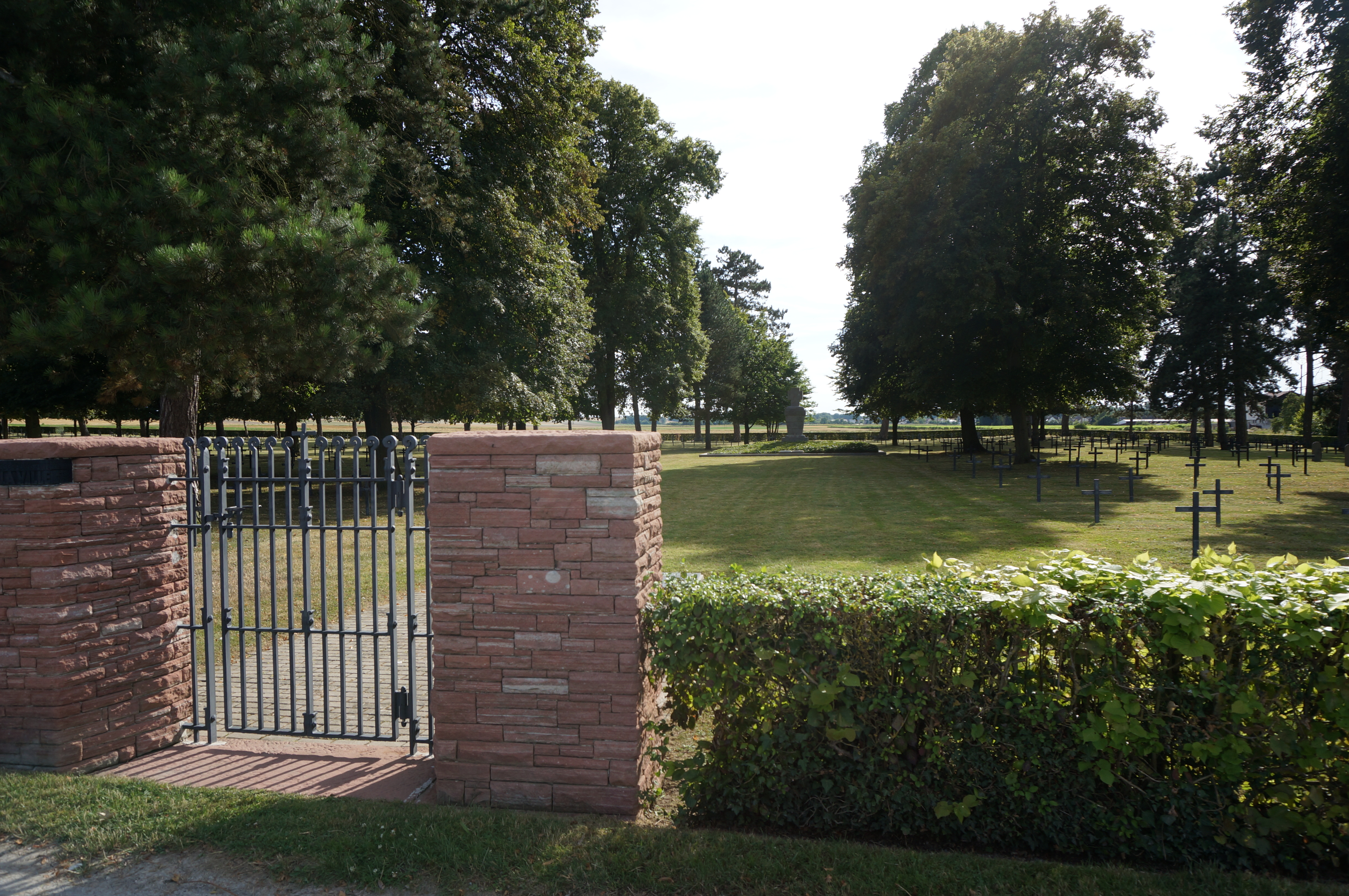
Entrance to the German War cemetery

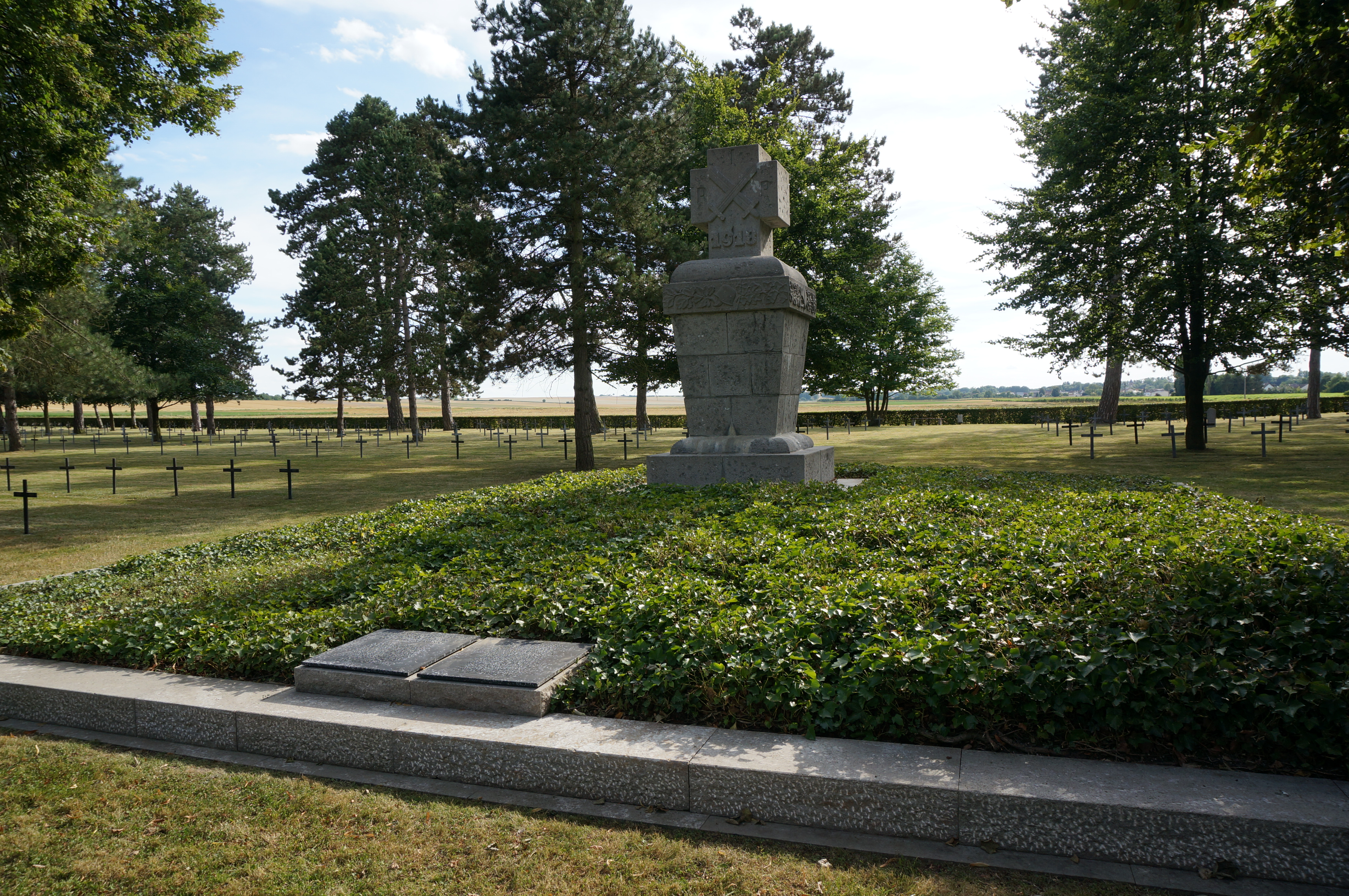
The German War cemetery

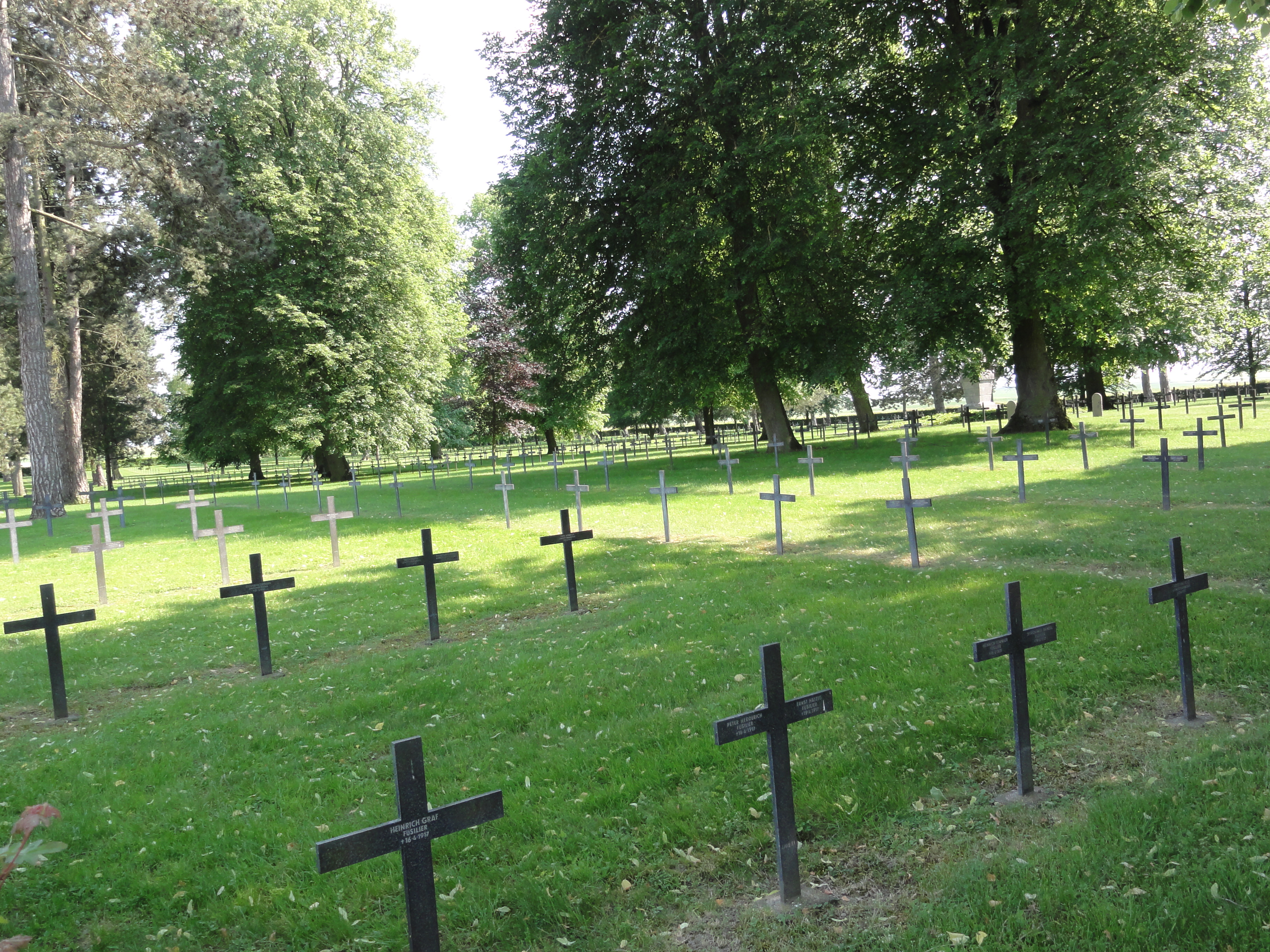
Inside the German War cemetery

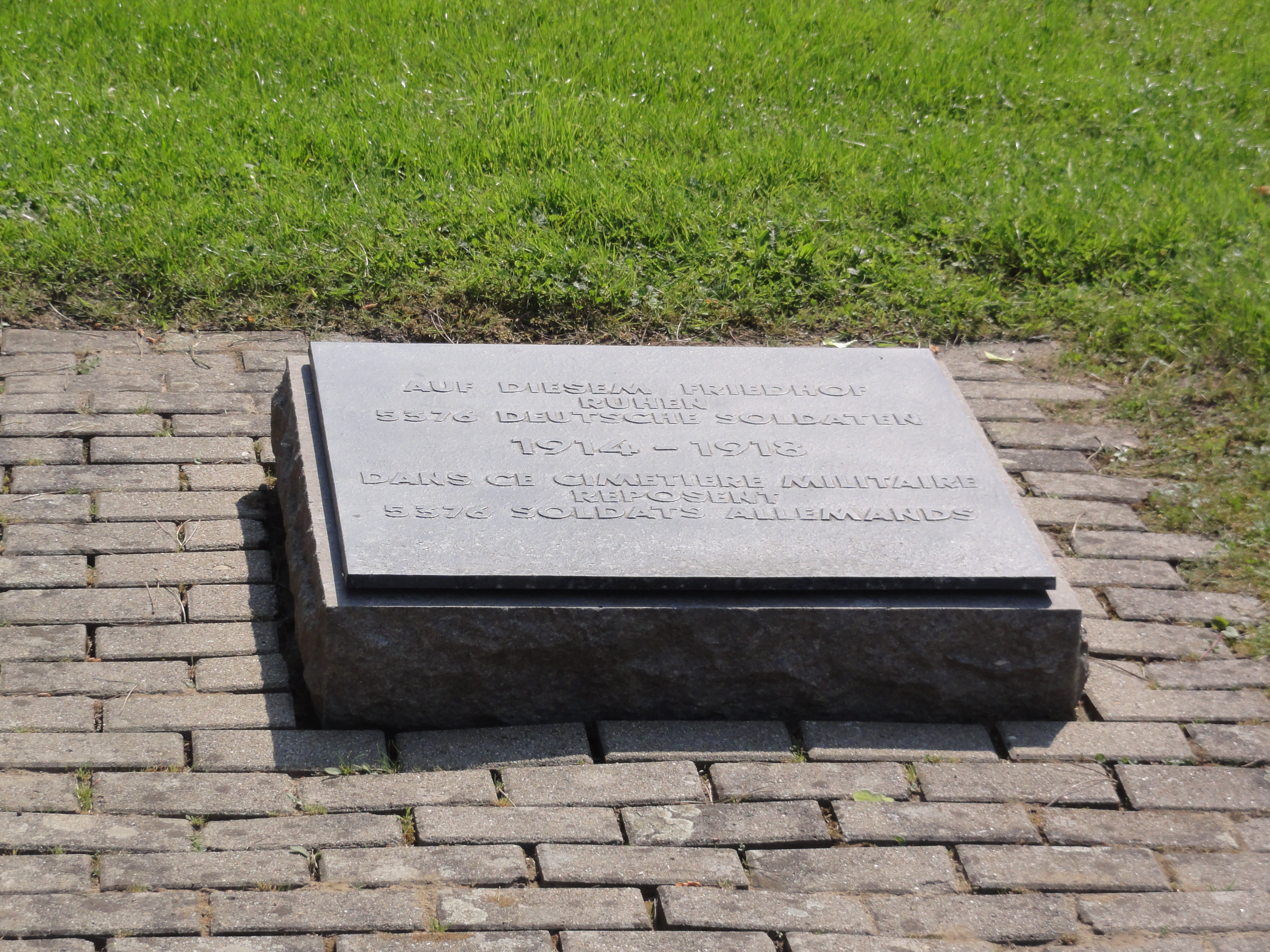
Commemorative Plaque at the German cemetery

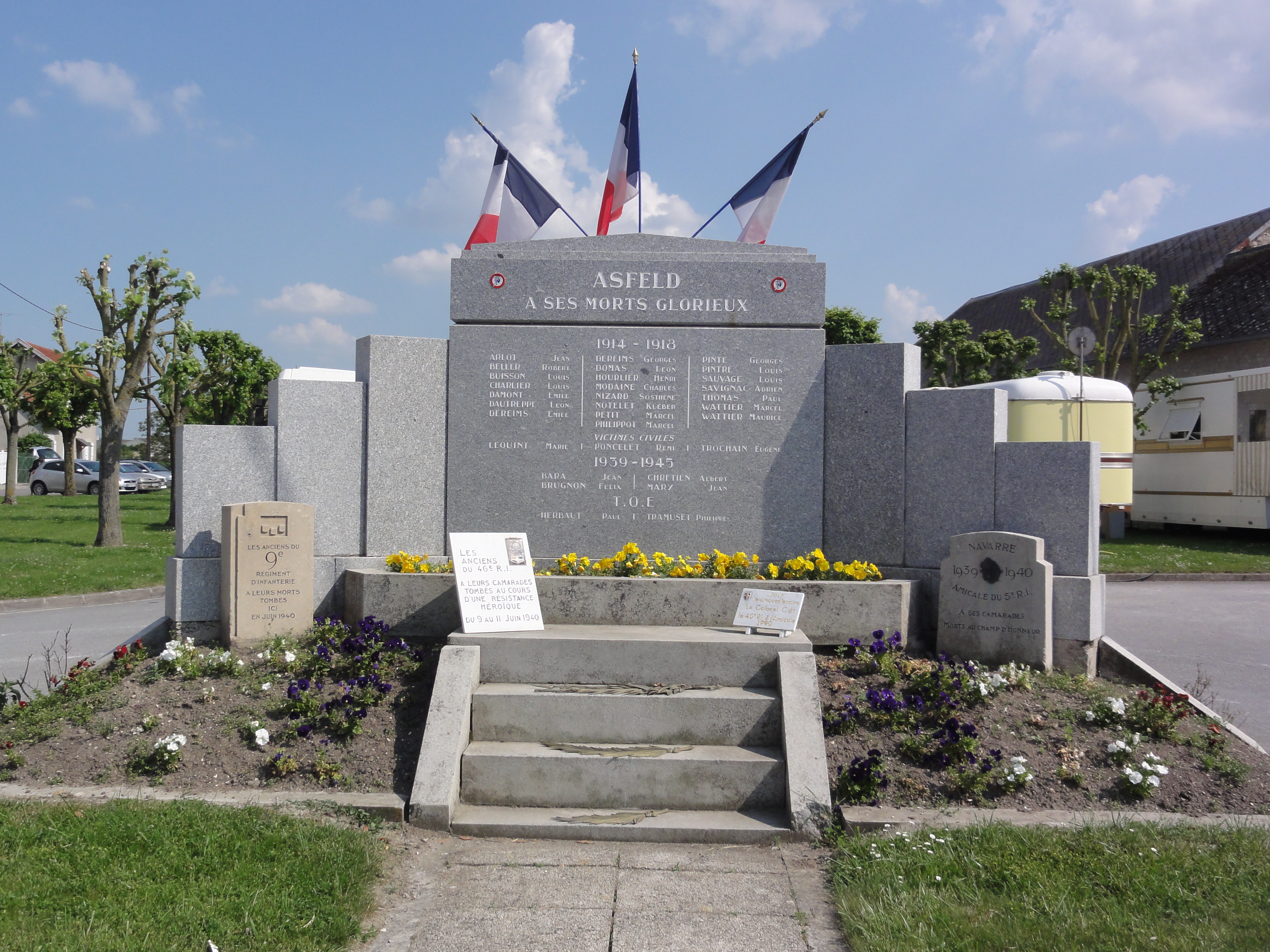
The War Memorial

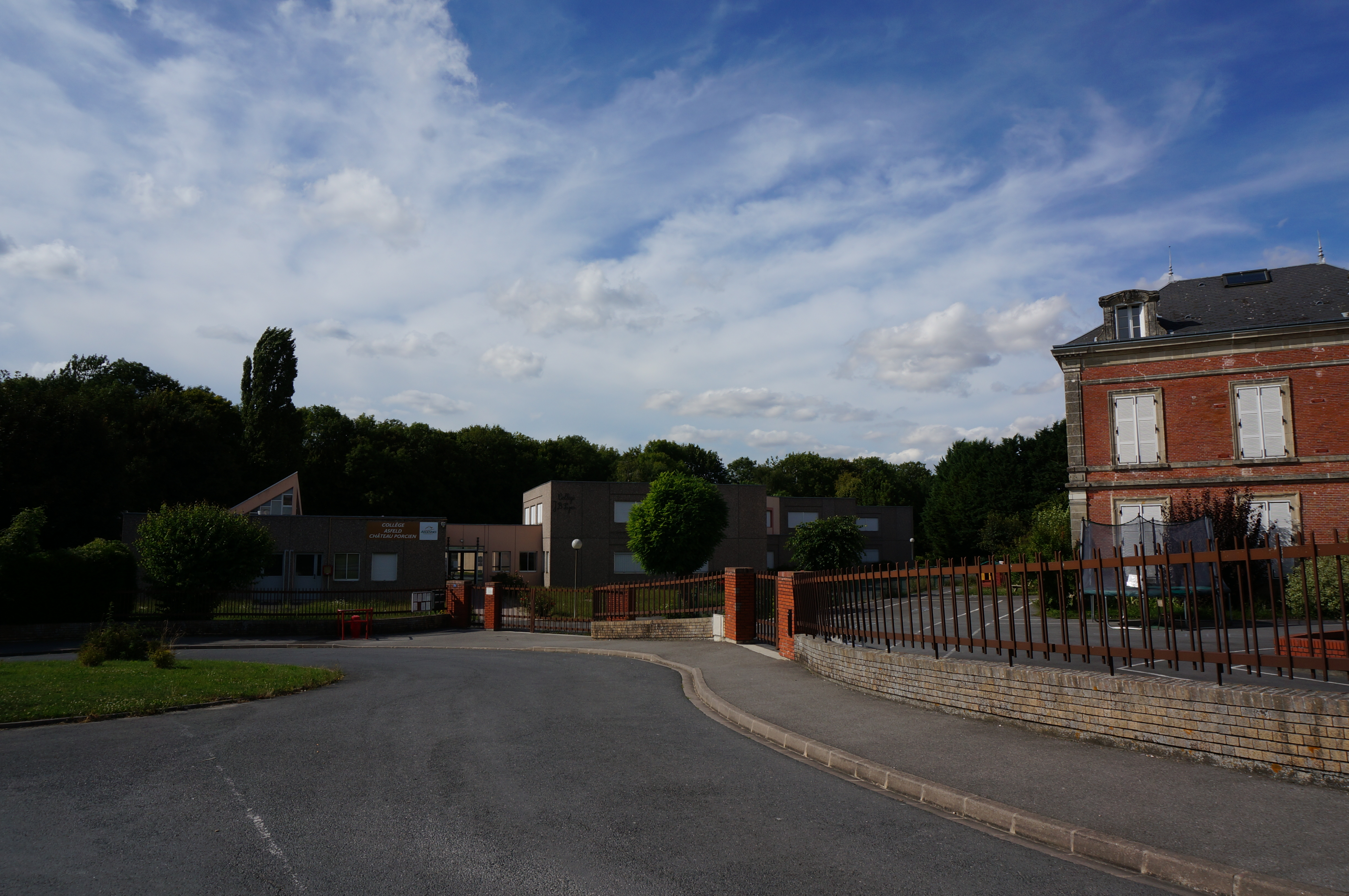
Asfeld college

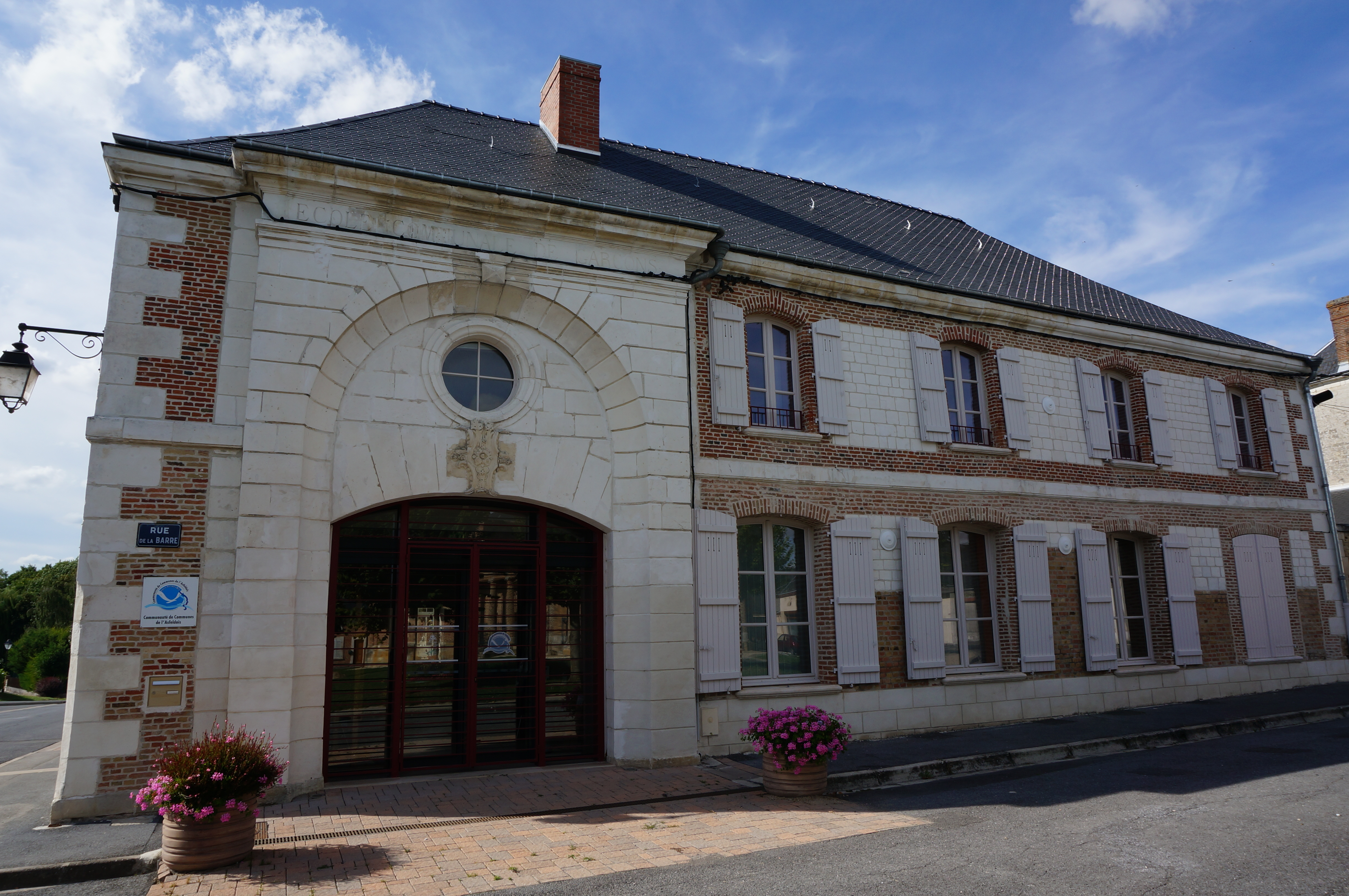
Community of communes office

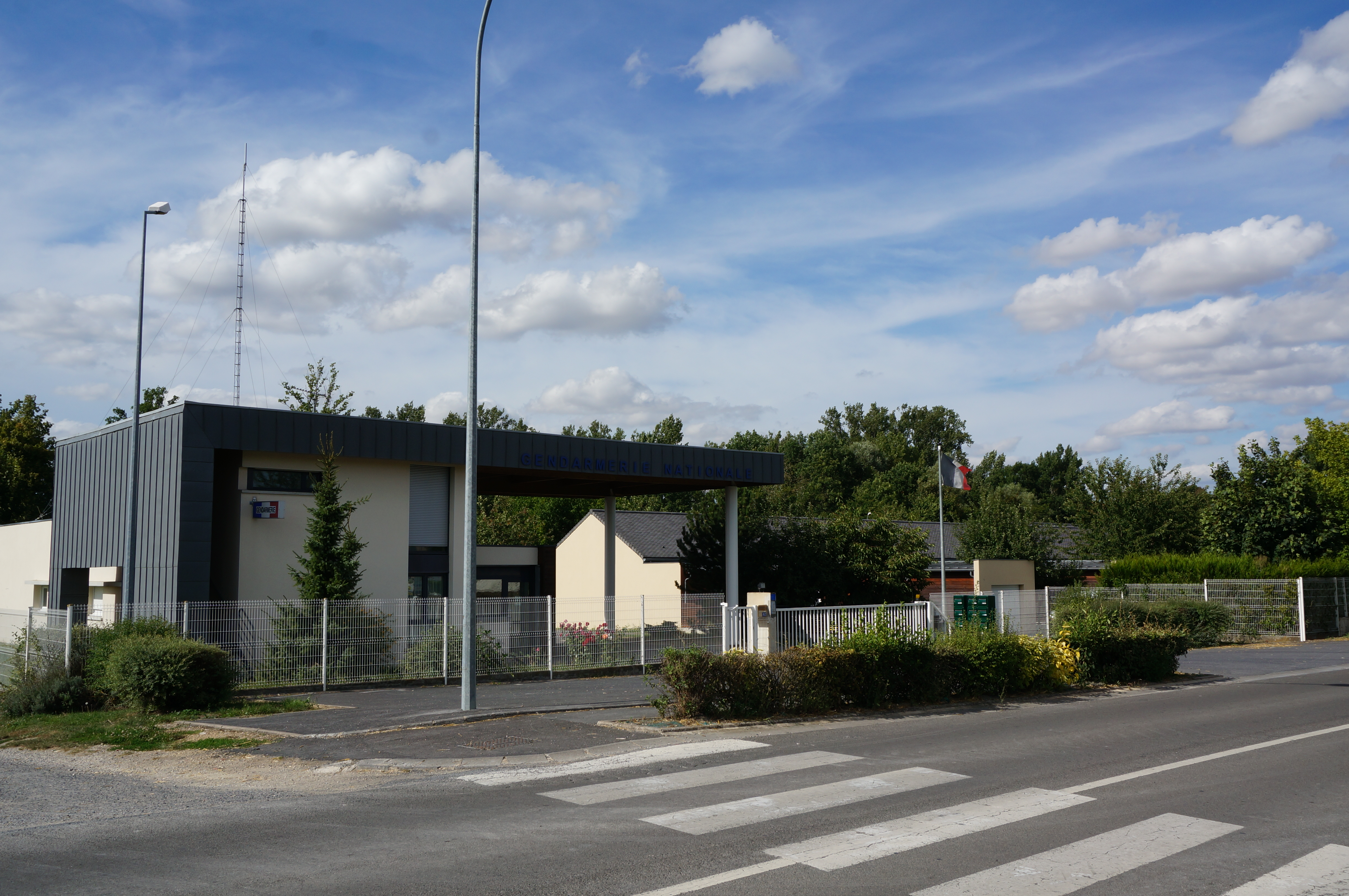
Police Station

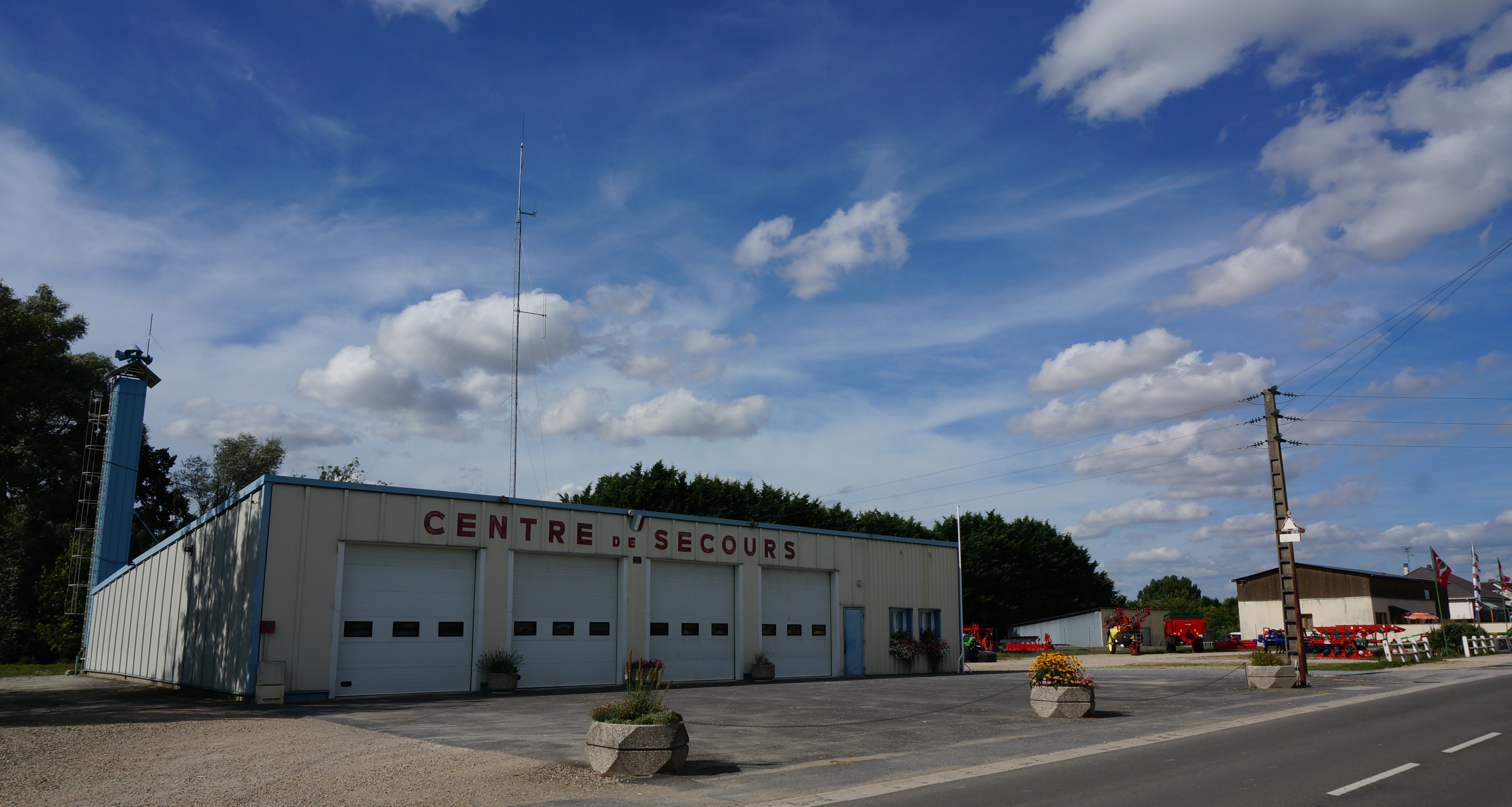
Fire Station

=== Religious heritage ===
- The Church of Saint-Didier (17th century) contains a:
  - Painting: The Martyrdom of Saint-Sebastian
- The Chapel of Notre-Dame-de-Pitié contains a Sculpture of the Virgin of Pity
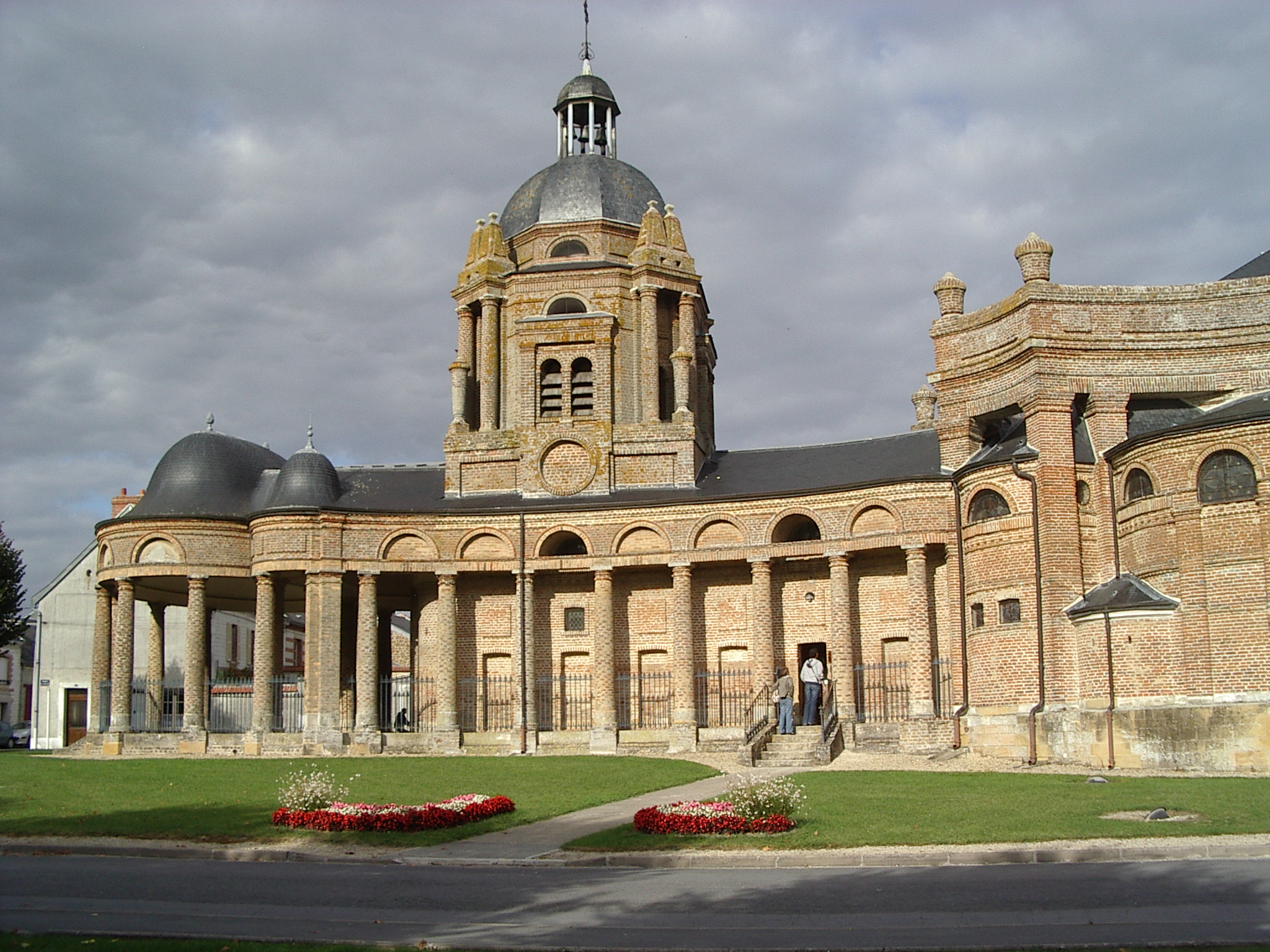
Church of Saint-Didier

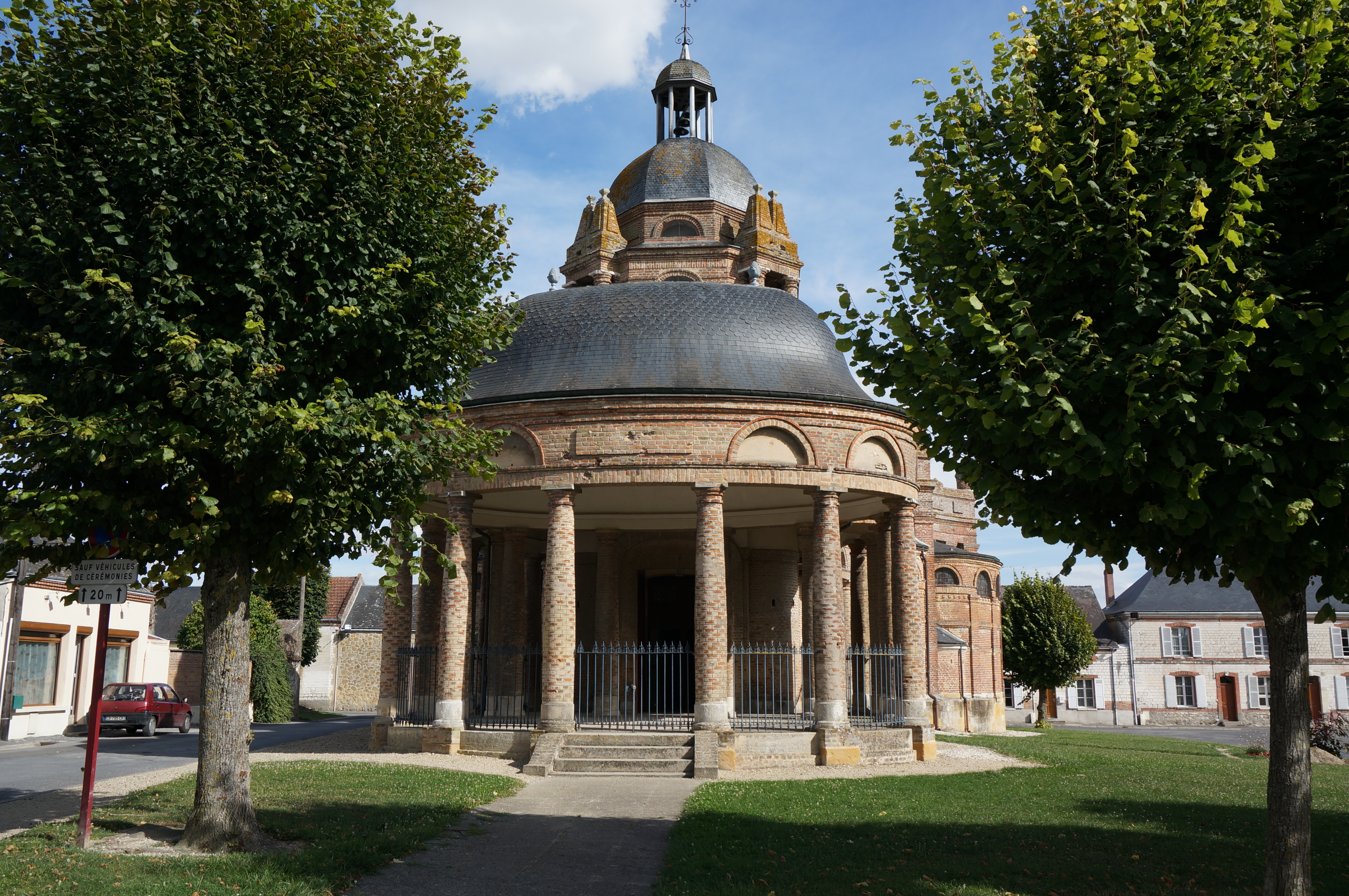
Entrance to the Church of Saint-Didier

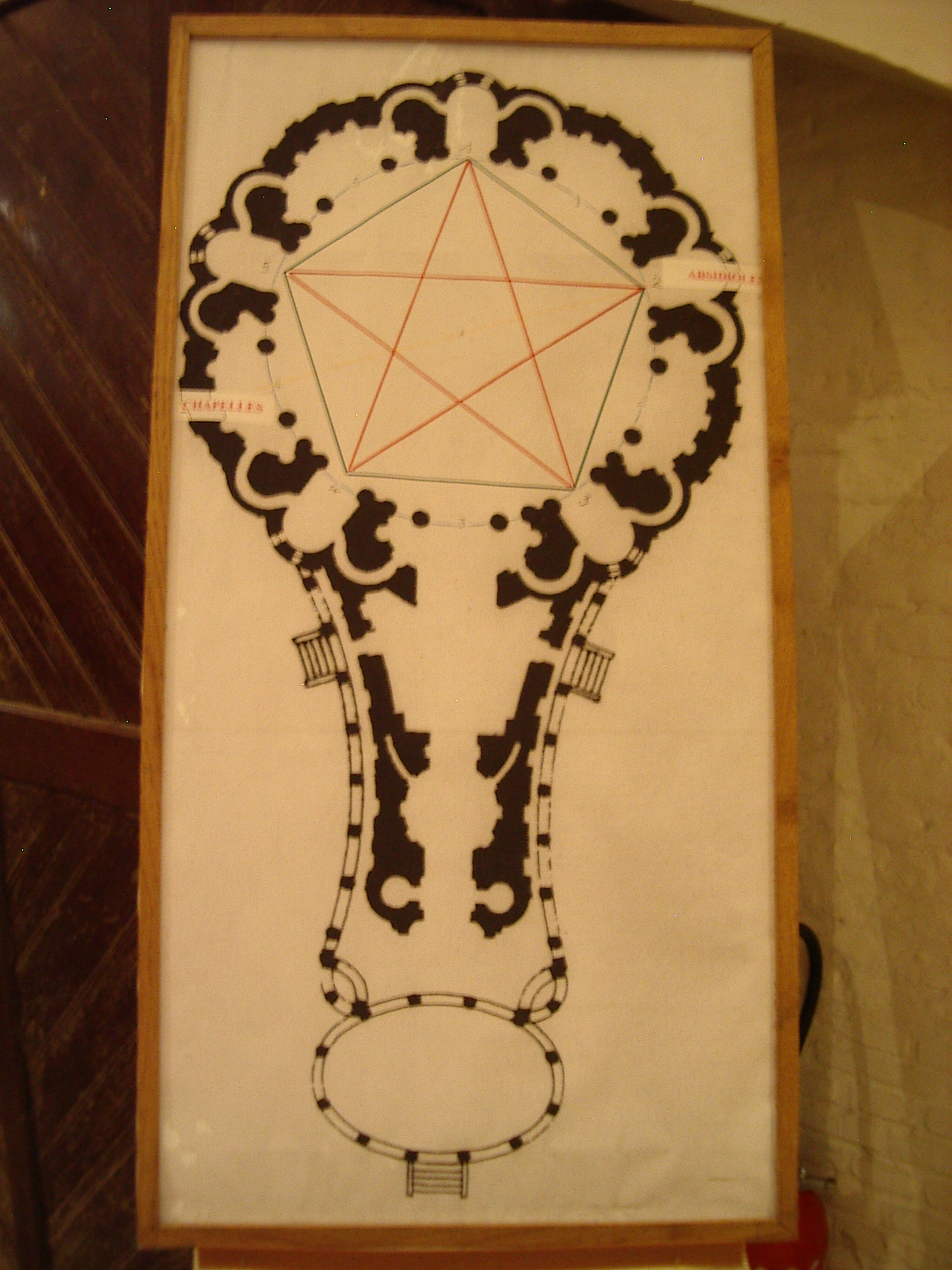
Plan of the church

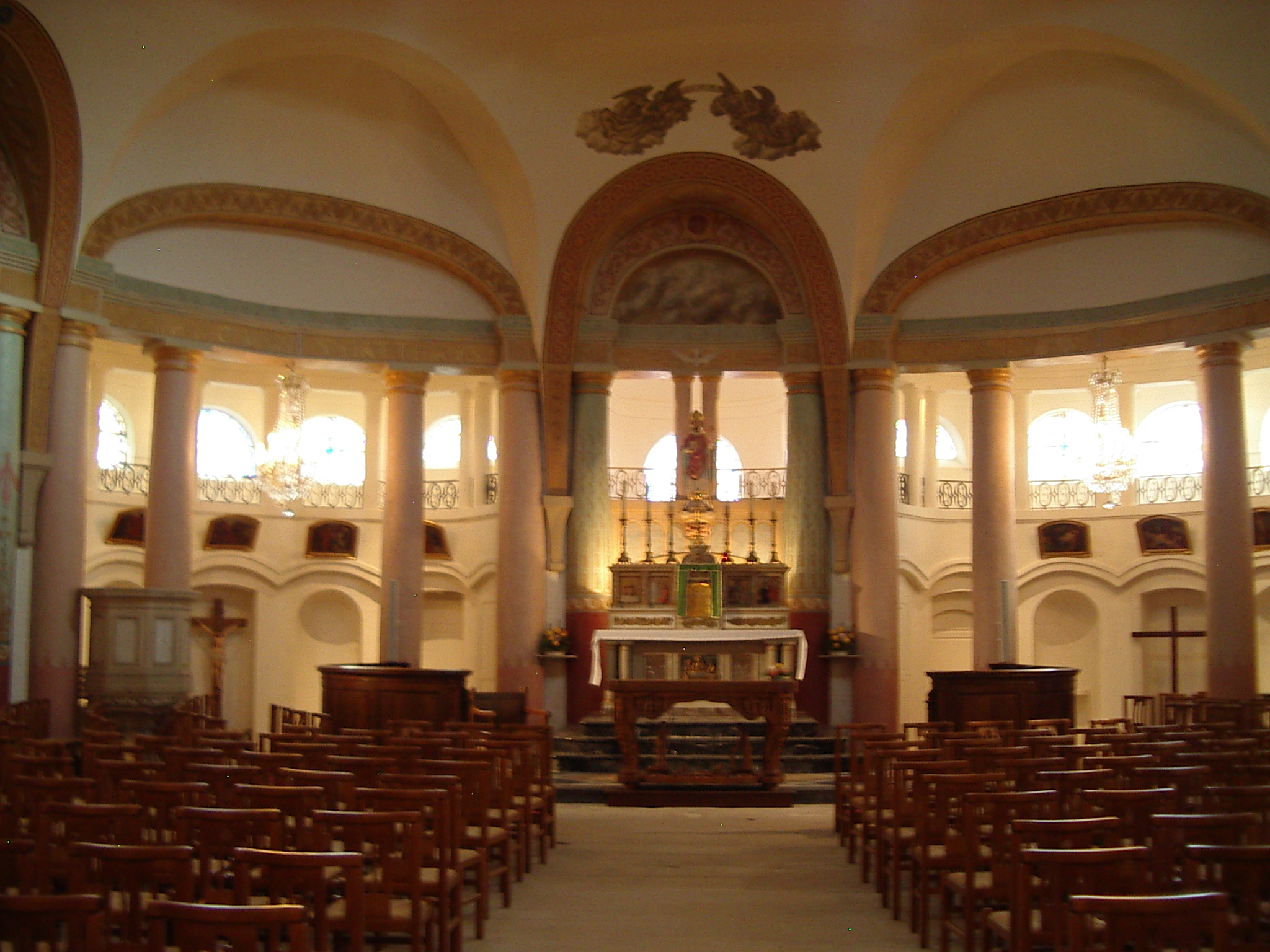
Choir of the church

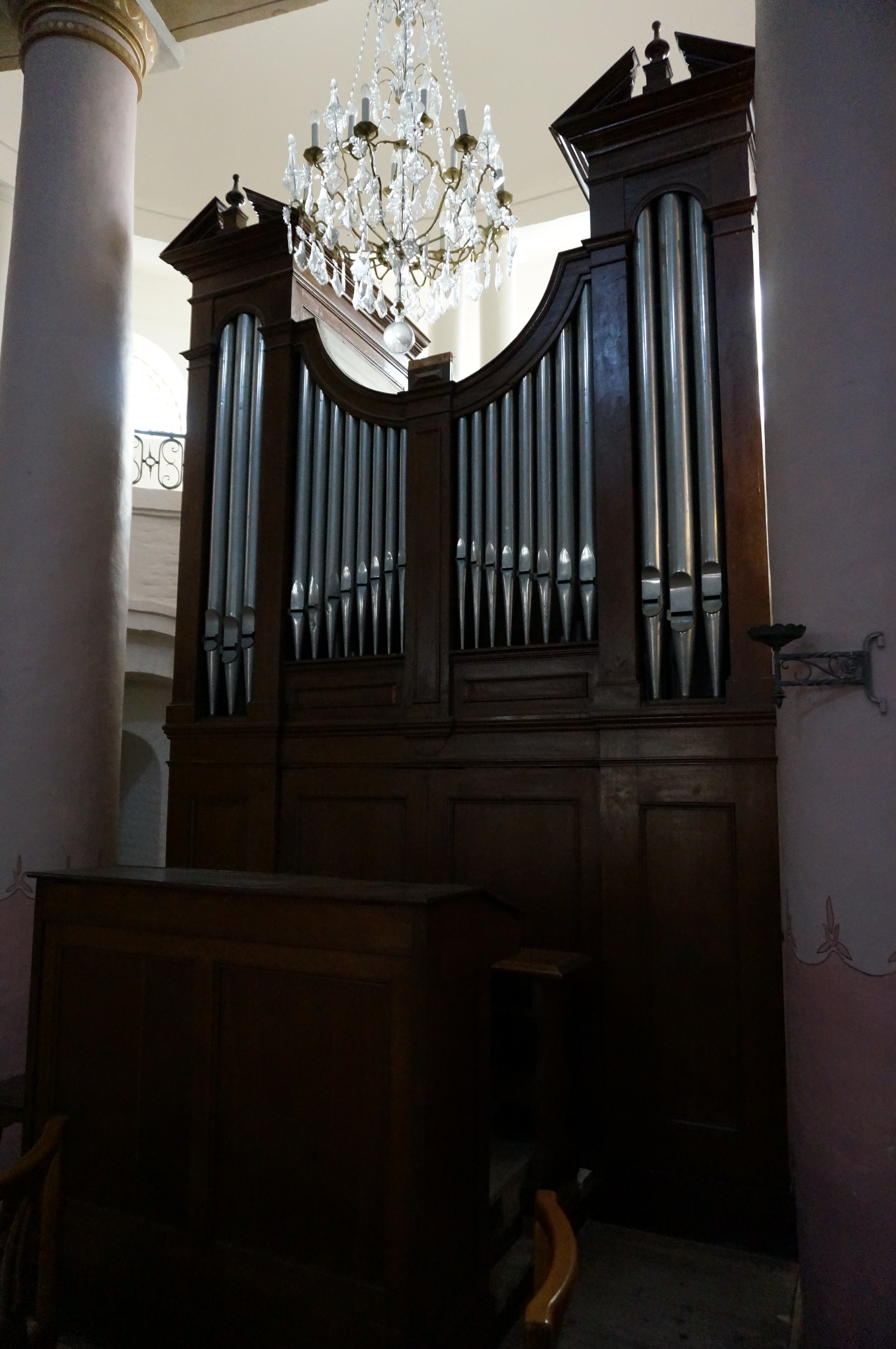
The church organ

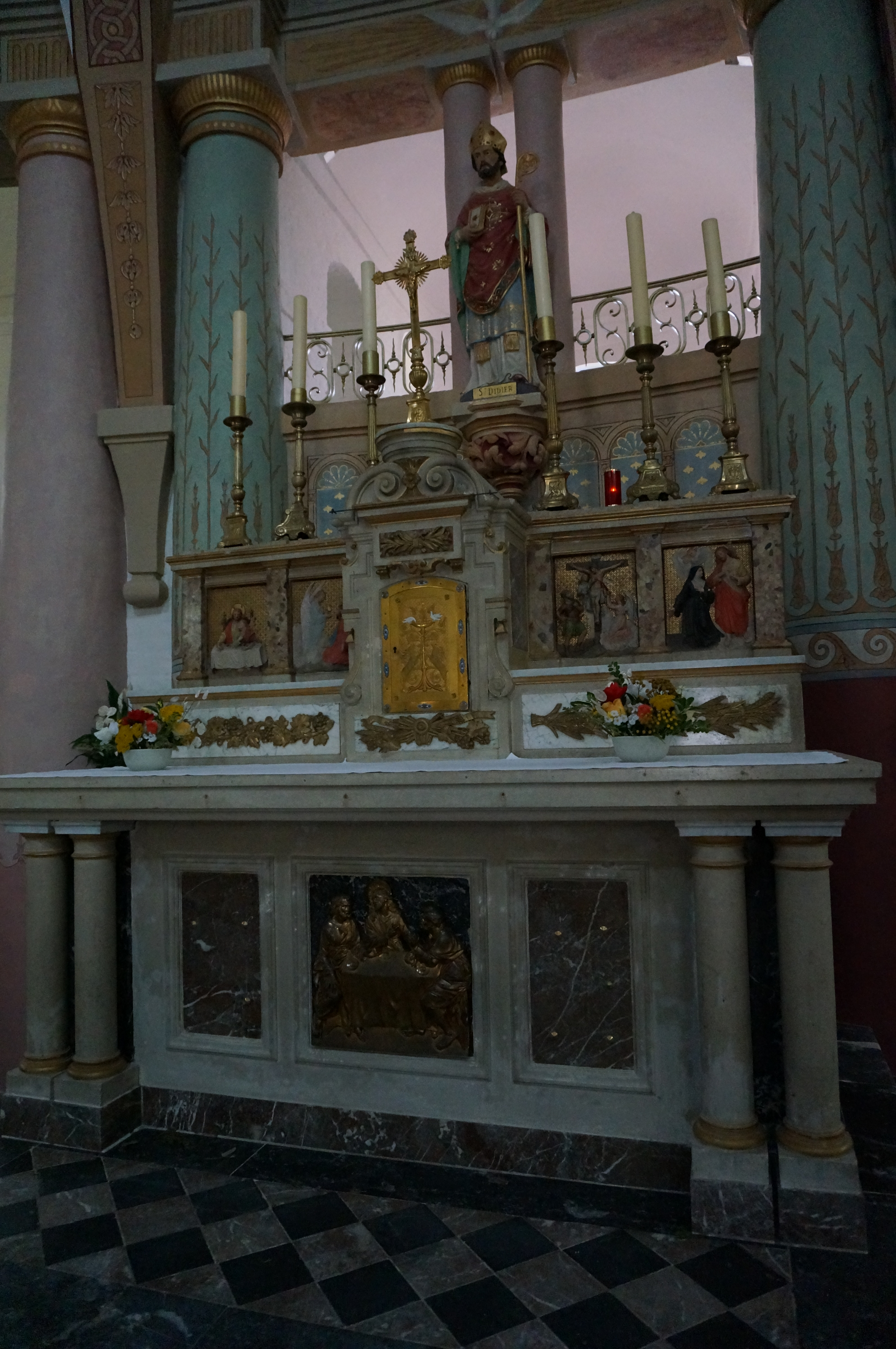
The main Altar

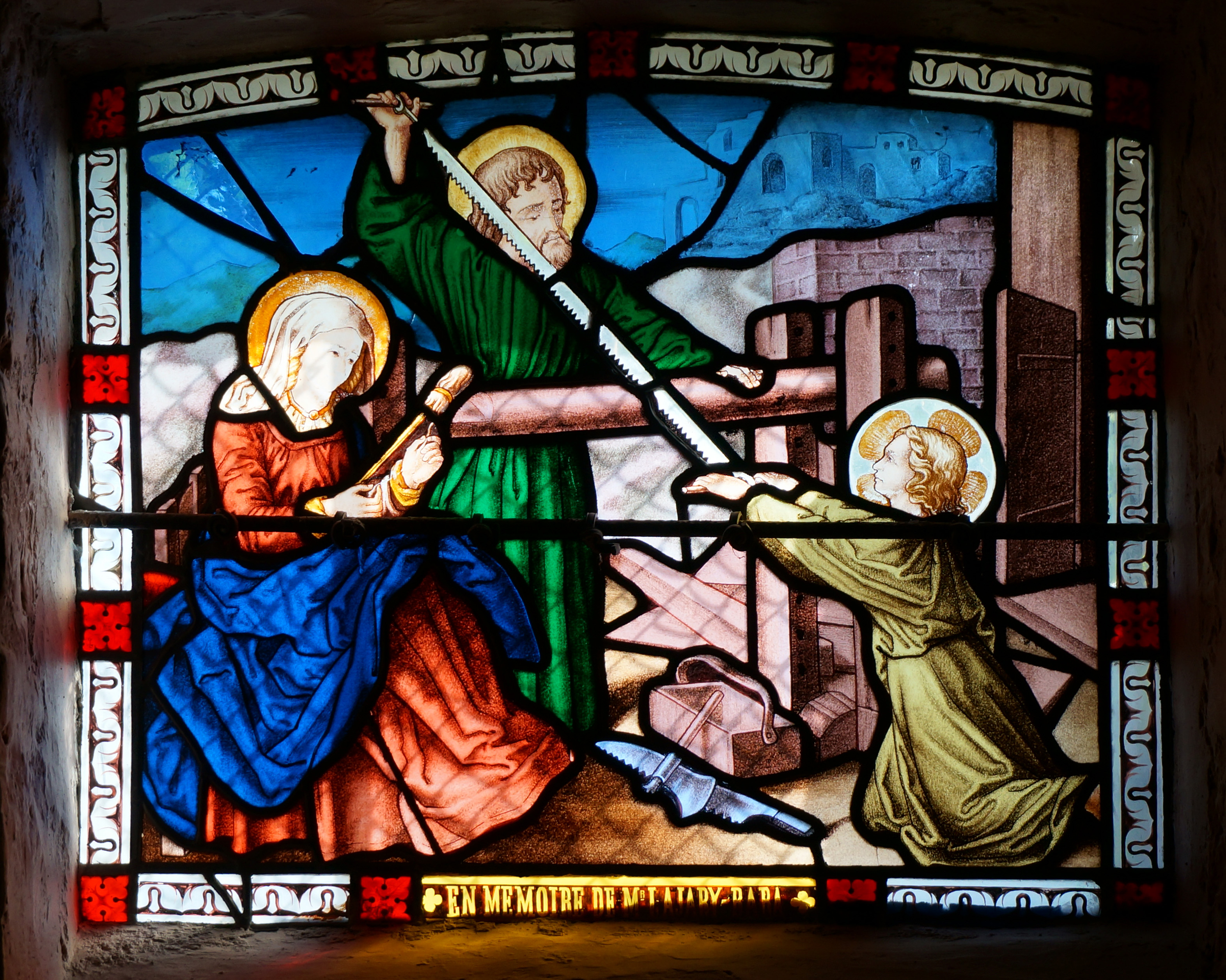
Stained glass in the church

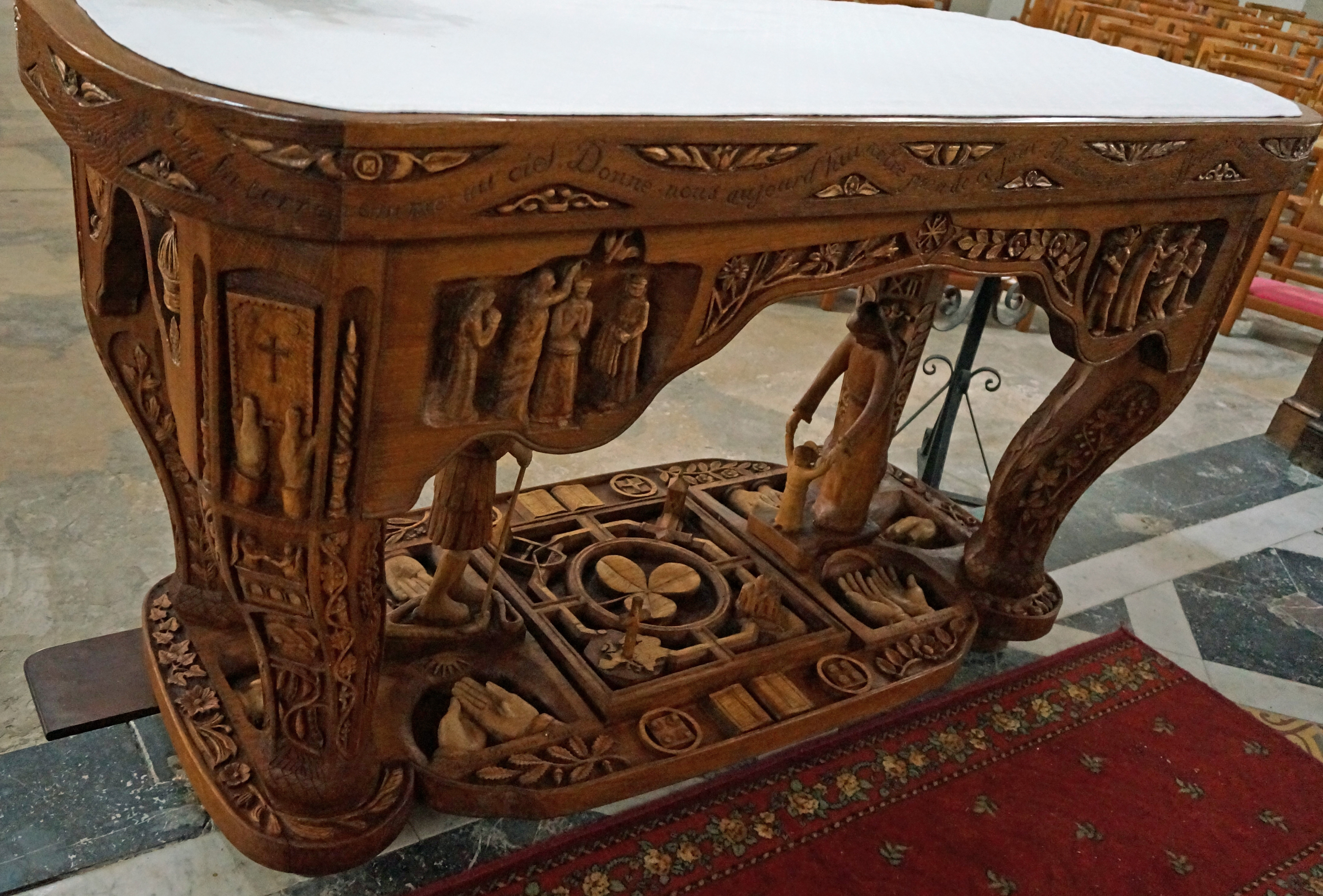
Table in the church

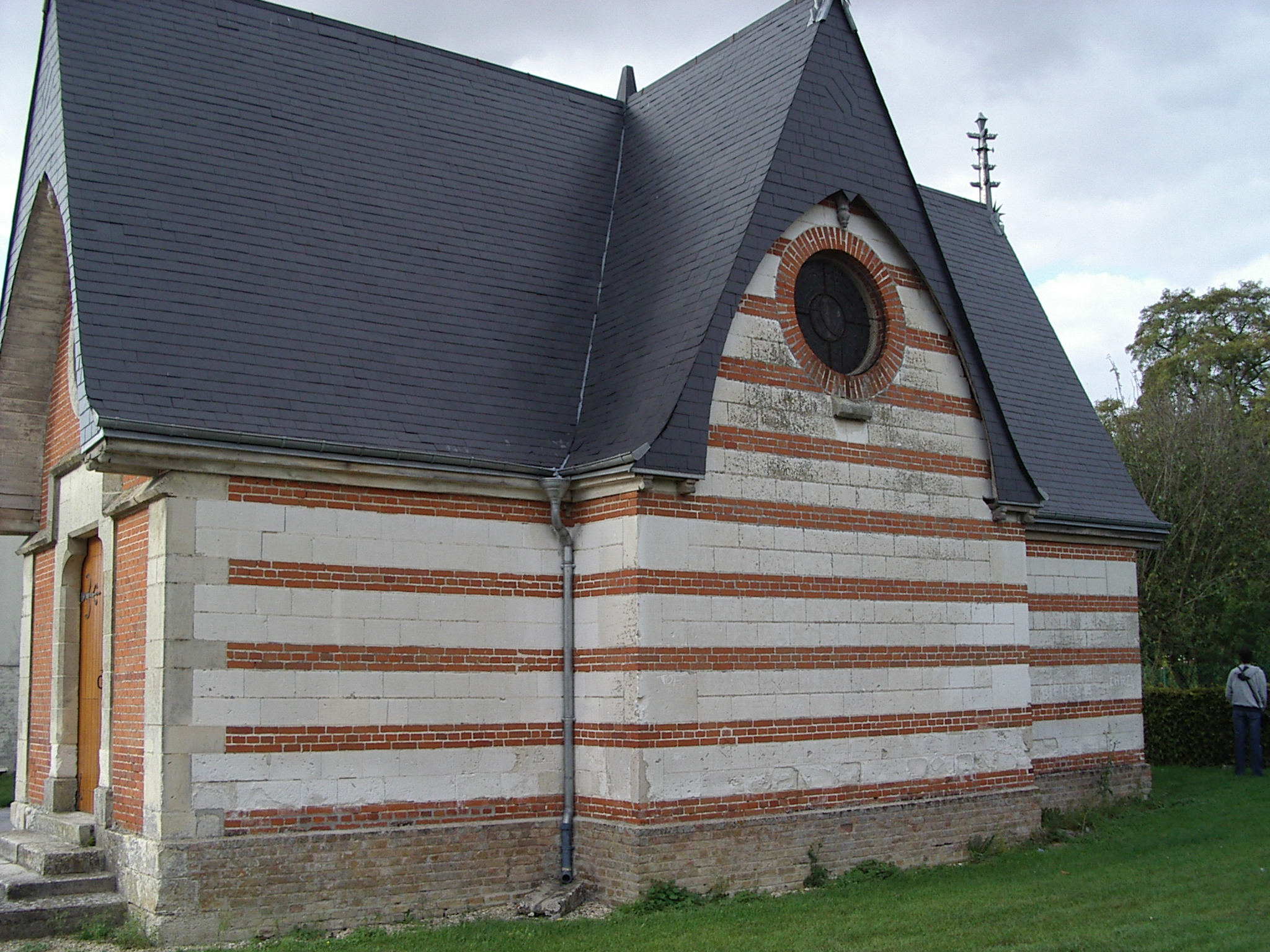
Chapel of Notre-Dame de la Pitié

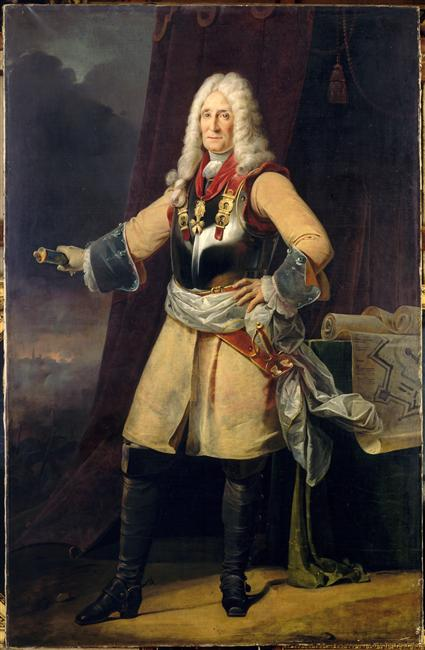
Claude François Bidal d'Asfeld

== Notable people linked to the commune ==
- Jean-Jacques de Mesmes, Count of Avaux
- Claude François Bidal d'Asfeld
- Nicolas Bidet of Juzancourt
- Jean-Baptiste Payer
- Désiré Linard

== See also ==
- Communes of the Ardennes department
