= Antoine Hamilton =

Irish soldier and writer (died 1719)

Anthony Hamilton
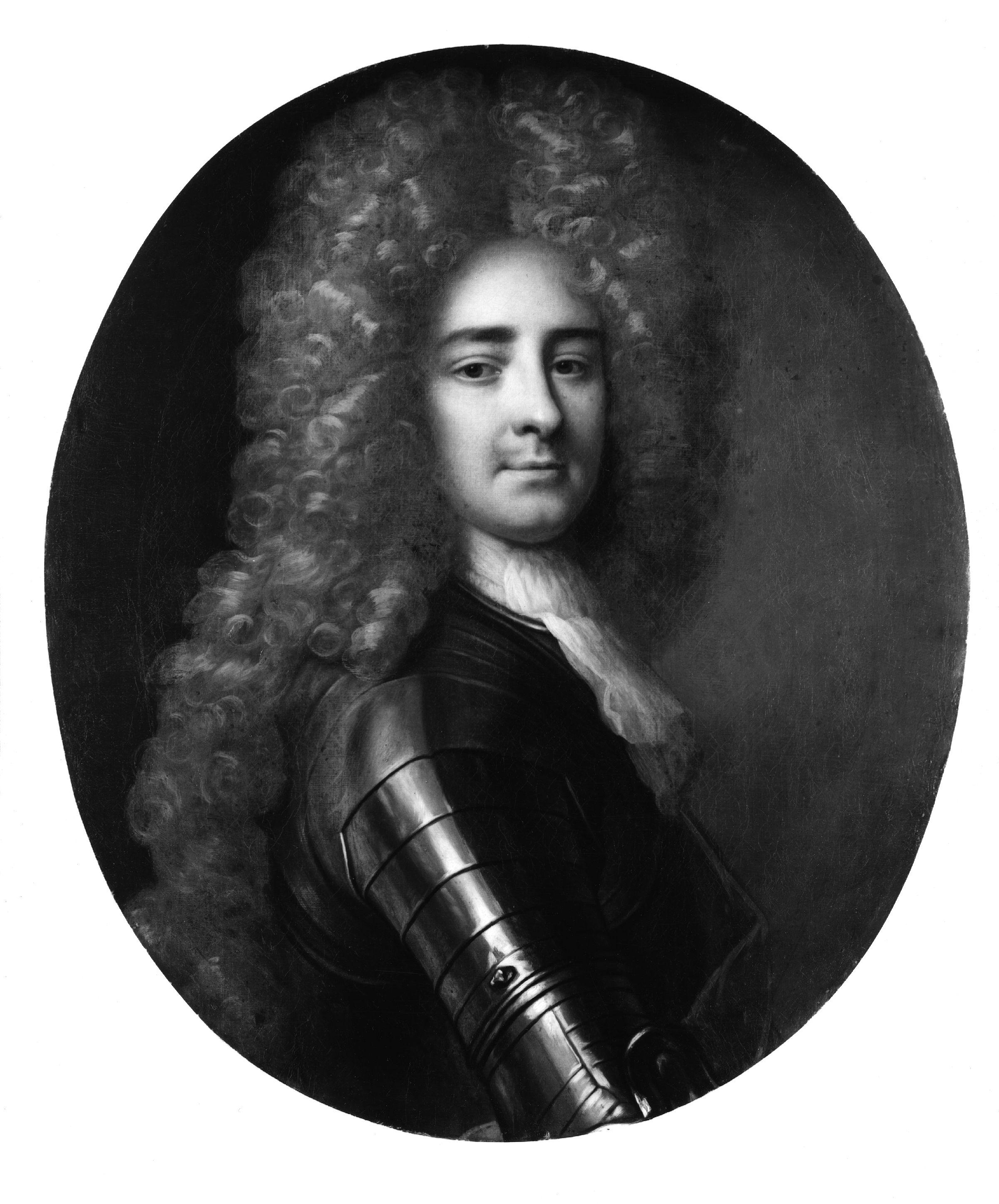
- Detail from the portrait below
- Born: 1644 or 1645; Ireland, probably Nenagh
- Died: 21 April 1719; Saint-Germain-en-Laye, France
- Father: Sir George Hamilton, 1st Baronet, of Donalong
- Mother: Mary Butler

Anthony Hamilton PC (Ire) (c. 1645 – 1719), also known as Antoine (Note: Ó Ciardha (2009) gives Antoine in parentheses after Anthony. French sources usually call him "Antoine Hamilton".) and comte d'Hamilton, was a soldier and a writer. As a Catholic of Irish and Scottish ancestry, his parents brought him to France in 1651 when Cromwell's army overran Ireland.

At the Restoration the family moved to England and lived at Whitehall. When Catholics were excluded from the army, Anthony followed his brother George into French service and fought in the Franco-Dutch War (1672–1678). He was wounded in the Battle of Entzheim. After the accession of the Catholic James II in 1685, he joined the Irish Army and fought for the Jacobites in the Williamite War (1689–1691). He saw action in the battles of Newtownbutler and the Boyne. The defeat led him to his last French exile.

In France Hamilton lived at the exile court at Saint-Germain-en-Laye where he became a courtier, poet, and writer. He chose French as his language and adopted a light and elegant style, seeking to amuse and entertain his reader. He wrote the Mémoires du Comte de Grammont, which focuses on the time his brother-in-law Philibert de Gramont spent at the court of Charles II. These memoirs are a classic of French literature and a source for the history of the Stuart Restoration. Hamilton also wrote many letters, poems, and five tales.

Family tree

Anthony Hamilton with parents and other selected relatives. (Note: This family tree is partly derived from the Abercorn pedigree pictured in Cokayne and from written genealogies of the Abercorns.) He never married. His father is sometimes confused with his granduncle, George Hamilton of Greenlaw and Roscrea.

Claud; 1st Ld; Paisley; 1546–1621	Margaret; Seton d. 1616	Walter; 11th Earl; Ormond; 1559 – 1633 'Beads'
James; 1st Earl; 1575–1618	Marion; Boyd d. 1632; Recusant	George of Greenlaw & Roscrea d. bef. 1657	Thomas; Viscount; Thurles d. 1619
James; 2nd Earl d. 1670	George; 1st Baronet; Donalong c. 1608 – 1679	Mary; Butler d. 1680	James; 1st Duke; 1610–1688
James c. 1630 – 1673; Courtier d.v.p.*	Philibert de Gramont; 1621–1707	Elizabeth; 1641–1708; Beauty	Anthony c. 1645 – 1719
James; 6th Earl c. 1661 – 1734

Legend

XXX	Subject of the article	XXX	Earls of Abercorn	XXX	Earls and Dukes of Ormond

*d.v.p. = predeceased his father (decessit vita patris)

== Birth and origins ==
Anthony was born in 1644 or 1645 (Note: Anthony Hamilton died on the 20 April 1719 aged 74. He was therefore born between 21 April 1644 and 20 April 1645. Older authors in error give his year of death as 1720, leading to a later date of birth (i.e. 1645 or 1646). Walter Scott (1846) proposes an earlier date but stays vague.) in Ireland, probably at Nenagh (/ˈniːnæ/), County Tipperary. (Note: Ó Ciardha (2009), Manning (2001), and Gleeson (1947) say Hamilton might have been born at Nenagh. However, most older authors give Roscrea, confusing his father with his granduncle. Sayous (1853) gives Drogheda but places it in Tipperary instead of Louth. The Encyclopædia Britannica (1911) also mentions Drogheda, but as an alternative to Roscrea. Voltaire in error believed Hamilton was born in Caen.) He was the third son of Sir George Hamilton and his wife Mary Butler.

His father was Scottish, the fourth son of James Hamilton, 1st Earl of Abercorn. He supported the lord lieutenant of Ireland, James Butler, Marquess of Ormond, during the Irish Confederate Wars and the Cromwellian conquest and called himself a baronet. (Note: Anthony's father's article has more detail about these attempts to become a baronet.)

Anthony's mother was half Irish and half English, the third daughter of Thomas Butler, Viscount Thurles, and his English Catholic wife Elizabeth Poyntz. Thurles (courtesy title) predeceased his father, Walter Butler, 11th Earl of Ormond, and never succeeded to the earldom. The Butlers were Old English. She was a sister of James Butler, making Anthony's father a brother-in-law of the lord lieutenant.

Anthony's father has been confused with his granduncle George Hamilton of Greenlaw and Roscrea. (Note: Anthony's father's article discusses his mistaken identity.) Both are called George and both married a Mary Butler. In 1640 Ormond had granted Anthony's father Nenagh for 31 years. Anthony was probably born there. (Note: Older sources usually give Roscrea as his place of birth, but it was his granduncle who lived there.) Hamilton's parents had married in 1635. (Note: Older sources give earlier dates for his parents' marriage, due to the mistaken identity.)

Anthony was one of nine siblings. They are listed in his father's article, but also see James, George, Elizabeth, Richard, and John individually. Anthony's parents were both Catholic, (Note: Anthony's father's article has some detail about Anthony's Protestant grandfather, the 1st Earl of Abercorn.) and so was he.

== Irish childhood ==
Hamilton was born during the Irish Confederate War. His father, despite being Catholic, sided with the lord lieutenant against the Confederates. The war had been halted by a truce in 1643. An attempted peace failed in March 1646. After a last extension the truce expired on 1 May. The newborn Anthony, his mother, and his siblings were brought to Dublin in May for their security.

In 1647 Ormond abandoned Dublin to the parliamentarians and left for England. Anthony, his mother, and siblings seem to have stayed behind in Ireland. Ormond together with Anthony's father returned to Ireland in 1648. In 1649, during the Cromwellian conquest, Ormond made Anthony's father receiver-general of the revenues as well as governor of Nenagh Castle, which he in vain tried to defend against Henry Ireton in November 1650.

== First exile ==
Having lost the leadership to the Catholic clergy, Ormond left for France in December 1650. Hamilton's father followed with his family in spring 1651. Anthony was about seven. They were accommodated by Anthony's aunt Elizabeth Preston, the Marchioness of Ormond, near Caen, Normandy. His father and his elder brothers, James and George, served Charles II in various functions. Lady Ormond left for England in August 1652, whereas Anthony's mother moved to Paris, where she lodged in the Convent of the Feuillantines. The Hamilton brothers frequented Charles II's and his mother's, Henrietta Maria, exile court at the Louvre.

== Restoration ==
In May 1660 the Restoration brought Charles II on the English throne. Hamilton's father and his elder brothers moved to Whitehall, where the court was. Charles II restored Donalong, Ulster, to Hamilton's father. About that year Charles allegedly created Hamilton's father baronet of Donalong and Nenagh.

Hamilton's elder brothers, James and George, became courtiers at Whitehall. The King arranged a Protestant marriage for James. Early in 1661 Hamilton's father also brought his wife and younger children to London, where they lived all together in a house near Whitehall.

In January 1663, at the court, the Hamilton brothers met Philibert, chevalier de Gramont, who had been exiled by Louis XIV for courting a maid of honour, on whom he had set his eyes.

Gramont integrated easily as French was spoken at the court. (Note: Auger referred to St James in error as it would become the principal royal residence only in 1698.) Hamilton befriended Gramont, who soon became part of the inner circle. Gramont courted Hamilton's sister Elizabeth.

An anecdote tells how George and Anthony intercepted Gramont at Dover, asking him whether he had not forgotten something in London. He replied "Pardonnez-moi, messieurs, j'ai oublié d'épouser votre sœur." (Forgive me, Sirs, I have forgotten to marry your sister). This episode might have happened in autumn 1663 when Gramont's sister Susanne-Charlotte told him in error that he could return to France. He went but found that he was not welcome. However, perhaps Gramont attempted to leave Elizabeth later, in December just before he announced his intention to marry her.

Gramont married Elizabeth in London, either in December 1663 or early in 1664. In March 1664, Louis XIV, having heard of Gramont's marriage, allowed him to return.

== Second exile ==
In 1667 the King dismissed from his Life Guards the Catholics who refused to take the Oath of Supremacy. Among them was Anthony's brother George, who in 1668 went to France. Anthony probably accompanied him. In 1671 George recruited a regiment in Ireland for French service. Hamilton seems to have accompanied him and in May helped his cousin John Butler to extinguish a fire in Dublin Castle. Hamilton then took service in his brother's regiment, fighting in the Franco-Dutch War (1672–1678). George and Anthony were later joined by their younger brother Richard. In 1672 the regiment garrisoned Liège and then occupied Utrecht in June. In 1673 Hamilton, by now a Captain, was in Limerick recruiting for the regiment.

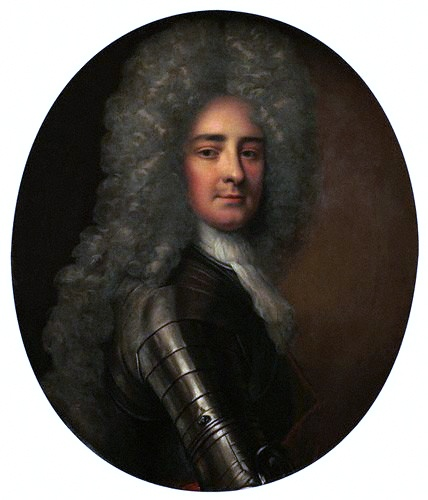
During his second French exile (Note: Portrait in the National Portrait Gallery, painted soon after 1668 or about 1700 and attributed to François de Troy.)

Anthony probably fought together with George under Turenne against Imperial troops in the Battle of Sinsheim in June 1674, and did surely so at Entzheim in October, where both were wounded. In the winter 1674–5 Anthony, George, and Richard travelled to England from where George returned to France while Anthony and Richard continued to Ireland to recruit. French ships picked up the recruits at Kinsale in April 1675, after a missed appointment at Dingle in March. Hamilton's Irish voyage caused him to miss Turenne's winter campaign in which Turenne marched south and surprised the Germans in upper Alsace, beating them at Turckheim.

In July 1675 Hamilton's regiment was at Sasbach, where George witnessed Turenne's death. At the retreat from Sasbach in August, the regiment suffered 450 casualties in the rearguard actions of the Battle of Altenheim. Louis XIV called in Condé, who stopped the German advance but retired at the end of the campaign. In the winter 1675–6 George, accompanied by either Anthony or Richard, again went recruiting and visited Lady Arran, wife of Richard Butler, 1st Earl of Arran, in January 1676. She called them "ye monsieurs". The regiment quartered that winter in Toul.

Luxembourg commanded on the Rhine in the campaign of 1676. In June George was killed in a rearguard action at the Zaberner Steige (Col de Saverne), where Imperial troops under the Duke of Lorraine pursued the French who were retreating eastward to Zabern (Saverne) in lower Alsace. Reputedly, Hamilton succeeded his brother as comte d'Hamilton, but that title may never have existed. (Note: The section "Comte d'Hamilton" in his brother George's article also discusses the title comte d'Hamilton title. Anthony is often called "Count" in French as well as English sources, but sometimes the title is omitted where one might expect it. Such is the case of his death certificate and Berwick's letter of 1713 where Anthony is called "M. [Monsieur] Antony Hamilton".) Thomas Dongan, who had been lieutenant-colonel, was preferred over Hamilton as the new colonel of what had been Hamilton's regiment. Louis XIV told Anthony that he had no regiment for him. Anthony left while Richard became lieutenant-colonel.

The Franco-Dutch war ended with the Treaties of Nijmegen, concluded between August 1678 and October 1679. The regiment was disbanded in December, anticipating the signature in February 1679 of the peace between France and the Emperor.

== Ireland ==
Hamilton had returned to Ireland by 1677. His father died in 1679. His nephew James, the future 6th Earl of Abercorn, then aged 17 or 18, inherited the family's lands.

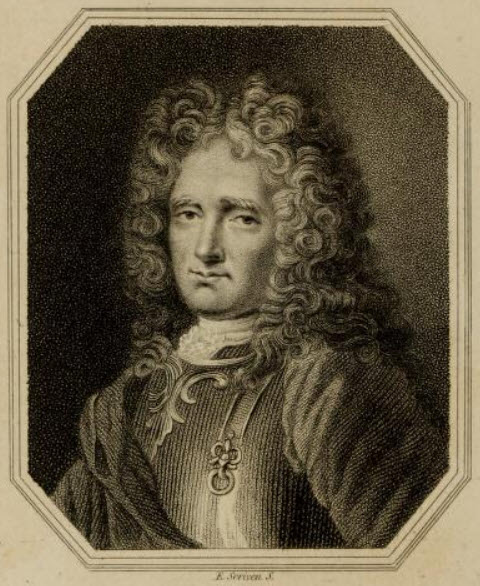
Engraved by E. Scriven (Note: Frontispiece of the 1811 London edition of the Mémoires. The caption reads "Le comte Antoine Hamilton". The image is signed under the frame E. Scriven S. [sculpsit].")

Hamilton may have visited France and have been the "comte d'Hamilton" who in January 1681 played a zephyr in the performance of Quinault's ballet Triomphe de l'Amour, to music by Lully, at the Château de Saint-Germain-en-Laye before Louis XIV. However, possibly, this was Richard. In summer 1681 Anthony lived in Dublin.

In February 1685 the Catholic James II acceded to the English throne. In April James sent Richard Talbot to Ireland to purge the Irish Army of "Cromwellians". Talbot replaced Protestants with Catholics, recruiting among others Anthony and his younger brothers Richard and John. Anthony was appointed lieutenant-colonel of Sir Thomas Newcomen's infantry regiment. In June James created Talbot earl of Tyrconnell. In August Hamilton was also made governor of Limerick, where his company of Newcomen's regiment was garrisoned, replacing Sir William King, a Protestant. Hamilton attended Mass in public. In October 1685 the king appointed Henry Hyde, 2nd Earl of Clarendon, a Protestant, lord lieutenant of Ireland. Clarendon arrived in January 1686. He considered Hamilton a moderate Catholic and possible ally. Clarendon praised Hamilton, saying that he understood the regiment better than its colonel. Clarendon also stated that Hamilton objected to replacing good Protestant officers with mediocre Catholic ones. Near the end of 1686, Hamilton became a member of the Irish privy council. In 1687 he was promoted colonel. In 1688 Hamilton was colonel of a regiment of foot.

At the eve of the Glorious Revolution in September 1688, James asked Tyrconnell to send four Irish regiments to England. Hamilton's was among them. The troops landed on the English west coast in October and marched across the midlands to southern England. Hamilton's regiment was stationed in Portsmouth, where the Duke of Berwick was governor. The regiment surrendered in Portsmouth on 20 December. (Note: Ó Ciardha (2009) remarks that it is not sure that Hamilton went with the regiment to England.) On the 23 James II embarked for France. It seems that Hamilton followed him. Anthony and John returned with James II to Ireland in 1689. Richard was already there.

In 1689 during the Williamite War, Tyrconnell promoted Hamilton major-general and gave him the command of the dragoons of an army under Justin McCarthy, Viscount Mountcashel, that he sent north to Belturbet, County Cavan, to fight the rebels of Enniskillen. In the battle of Newtownbutler, in July, Hamilton commanded the horse. The outcome would show that he was "better with his pen than with his sword". Mountcashel asked him to pursue retreating enemy troops, but the enemy led him into a trap and Hamilton's dragoons were routed. Hamilton was wounded in the leg at the beginning of the action and fled the scene. With Captain Peter Lavallin of Carroll's dragoons he was court martialled by Rosen, the highest-ranking French general. Given his family's influence, Hamilton was acquitted, but Lavallin was shot. This affair destroyed Hamilton's reputation as a soldier. When in spring 1690 the Irish Brigade was formed, the French wanted neither Richard nor Anthony among its officers.

Anthony, as well as his brothers Richard and John, fought at the Battle of the Boyne in July 1690. Anthony rode in the cavalry charges. Afterwards he fought at the first Siege of Limerick. When William abandoned his siege end of August, Tyrconnell sent Hamilton to France to report the deliverance. He may not have returned. His presence at the Battle of Aughrim in 1691 is disputed, but his brother John was fatally wounded there.

== Final exile, death, and timeline ==
Hamilton lived the last thirty years of his life at the exile court at the Château-Vieux of Saint-Germain-en-Laye. (Note: In Hamilton's time there were two royal castles at Saint-Germain-en-Laye: The old (Château-Vieux) and the new (Château-Neuf).) He held no office, but James II granted him a generous pension. (Note: This pension initially was 2,000 livres per year; in 1703 it was diminished to 1,320 but increased to 2,200 in 1717. The 2000 livres were about £150 as the pound sterling was worth about 13 French livres (one Écu (60 sols or 3 livres) was worth 54 pence). Per month this gave him about £12.5, equivalent to about £2,000 in 2025.) Hamilton was also given an apartment in the castle. He was appreciated as an ornament of that court.

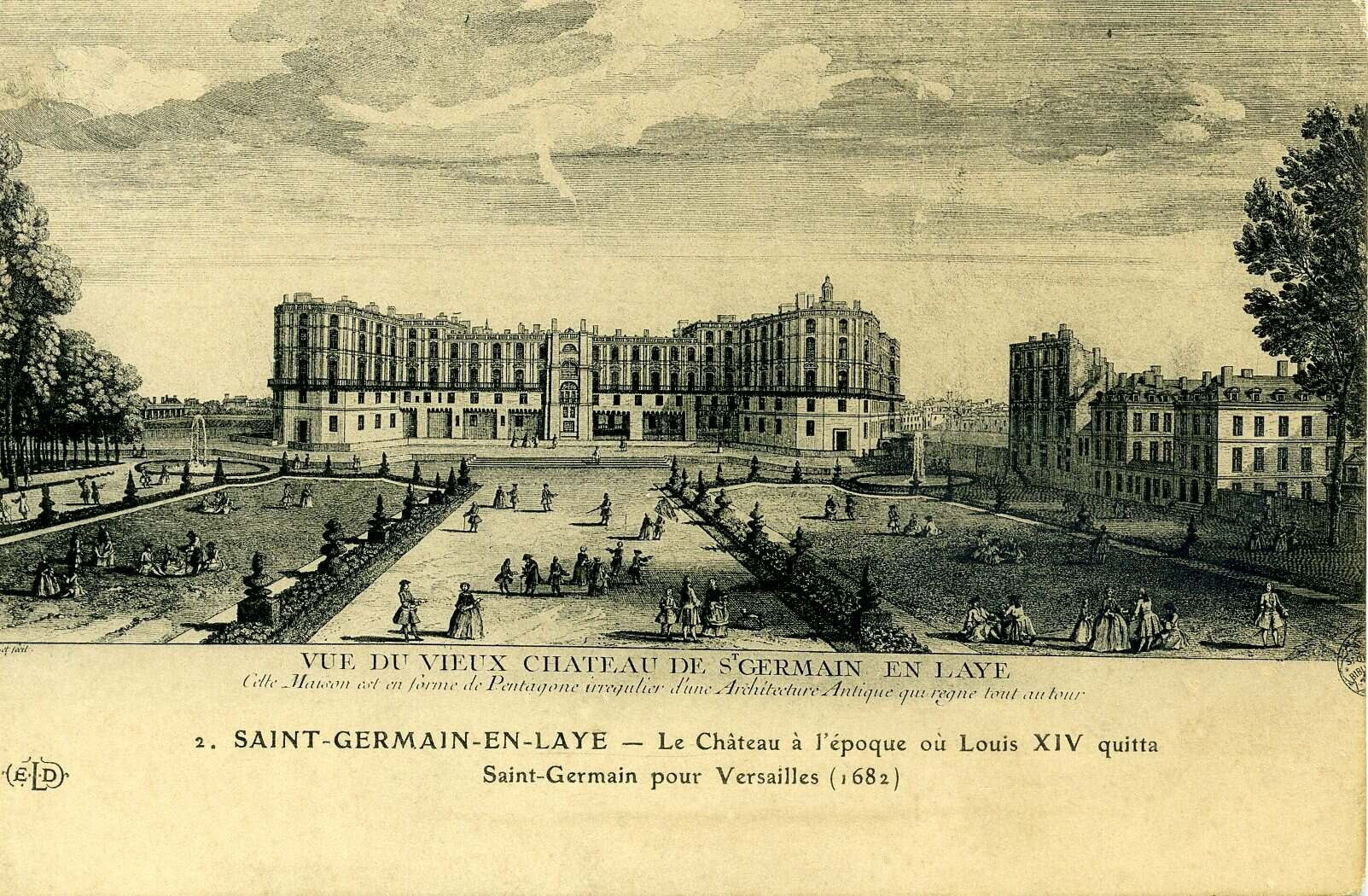
The Château-Vieux de Saint-Germain-en-Laye, north side, as it was in Hamilton's time. (Note: Vue du Vieux Château de St. Germain en Laye, engraving by Jacques Rigaud (cropped), 1725. The castle had stayed unchanged since the additions made for Louis XIV by Jules Hardouin-Mansart in the 1680s.)

At Saint-Germain Hamilton got acquainted with the Bulkeley sisters, especially Anne and Henrietta. Their father, Henry, master of the household to Charles II at Whitehall and to James at Saint-Germain, died in 1698. Their mother, Sophia, was a sister of the Belle Stuart. Berwick married Anne in 1700 at Saint-Germain, as his second wife. Hamilton affectionately called her "Nanette". He was in love with Henrietta or at least wrote her admirative letters. She was about 30 years younger than him and had no dowry. (Note: Hamilton was born in 1644 or 1645, while she was born after 1675 as this is when her older sister was born.) Hamilton thought his pension insufficient to support a family.

About 1696 Hamilton wrote his tale Zénéyde, (Note: Zénéyde mentions the "late Archbishop of Paris", François de Harlay, who had died in August 1695. Zénéyde was therefore written shortly after that date.) in which he denounces the bigotry of James's last years. Early in 1701 Hamilton accompanied Berwick to Rome to ask the new pope, Clement XI, for help. In March James suffered a stroke. Berwick was called for and arrived back in Saint-Germain in April. In September James II died at the Château-Vieux of Saint-Germain. Hamilton wrote a poem Sur l'agonie du feu roi d'Angleterre [On the Agony of the Late King of England]. His successor, James III, was 13. The court became gayer and Hamilton like it better.

In 1703 Louis XIV gave Hamilton's sister Elizabeth a house at Versailles, where Hamilton often visited. In 1704 Hamilton went to see Gramont at Séméac in Gascogne, where he decided to write his friend's memoirs. Hamilton was part of the circle around the Duchess of Maine, where he was known as "Horace d'Albion". It was partly at her seat at Sceaux that he wrote the Mémoires. In 1705 he attended the feast that Nicolas de Malézieu and the duchess gave at Châtenay.

In 1707 Gramont died in Paris. (Note: La Chenaye (1774) and Dangeau (1857a) give Gramont's death in N.S., Chisholm (1910), in O.S.) Hamilton was said to have sailed to Scotland in the attempted invasion of 1708, but only Richard went. In June Hamilton's sister Elizabeth died in Paris.

In 1712 James III left Saint-Germain as France was about to drop the Jacobites, a concession they made in 1713 at the Peace of Utrecht. Richard followed James III to Bar-le-Duc in Lorraine, whereas Anthony stayed behind at Saint-Germain and was allowed to keep his apartment. The dowager queen, Mary of Modena, also stayed. Hamilton met the young Voltaire at the suppers of the Temple Society shortly before 1715. (Note: The Temple was the seat of Philippe, Duke of Vendôme, grand prior of France of the Knights of Malta, but the Grand Prior could not have been there at the time because he was arrested in Switzerland in October 1710 and could not return to France until 1711. Back in France, Louis XIV banished him to Lyon and he could return to Paris only after the king's death in September 1715. The grand Prior's friend Chaulieu lived at the Temple and probably presided over the suppers that Hamilton attended.) Hamilton never married and died at Saint-Germain-en-Laye on 20 April 1719. (Note: His death certificate states that he was buried on 21 April 1719 and had died the day before. Dulon (1897) seems to be the first to give the right year. Many give 1720 in error. The earlied occurrence of his wrong death date seems to be La Chesnaye in 1774) He was buried on the 21 in the parish church. A distant cousin, John Nugent, equerry to James III, attended the funeral.

Timeline
As his birth date is uncertain, so are all his ages. Italics for historical background.
Age	Date	Event
0	1644 or 1645	Born, probably at Nenagh in Ireland
1	May 1646	Moved to Dublin with his mother.
1	17 Sep 1646	Owen Roe O'Neill took Roscrea.
2	28 Jul 1647	Ormond abandoned Dublin to the Parliamentarians.
3	13 Nov 1647	Battle of Knocknanuss, the Confederates were beaten by Inchiquin.
3	29 Sep 1648	Ormond returned to Ireland landing at Cork.
4	30 Jan 1649	Charles I beheaded
4	2 Aug 1649	Battle of Rathmines. Michael Jones defeated Ormond before Dublin.
5–6	Oct 1650	Father defended Nenagh Castle against the Parliamentarians.
6	7 Dec 1650	James Butler, Marquess of Ormond, left Ireland.
6–7	Early in 1651	Taken to France by his parents
15	29 May 1660	Restoration of Charles II
15–16	1660 or 1661	Brought to England by his parents after the Restoration
18	15 Jan 1663	The chevalier de Gramont arrived in London.
19	1663/1664	Sister Elizabeth married Gramont.
26–27	1671	Brother George raised an Irish regiment for French service.
28	Jun 1673	Brother James fatally wounded in a sea-fight against the Dutch
29–30	6 Oct 1674	Wounded at the Battle of Entzheim
30–31	1675	Travelled to Ireland to recruit
31–32	1676	Brother George killed at the Col de Saverne
33–34	1678	Supposedly succeeded his brother George as "comte d'Hamilton"
34–35	26 Jan 1679	Treaties of Nijmegen ended the Franco-Dutch War between France and the Empire.
34–35	1679	Father died.
35	Aug 1680	Mother died.
40	6 Feb 1685	Accession of James II, succeeding Charles II
40	24 Feb 1685	Boyle & Granard appointed lords justices replacing Ormond, lord lieutenant
40–41	1685	Took service in the Irish Army as lieutenant-colonel
40	1 Aug 1685	Made governor of Limerick
40–41	1 Oct 1685	Henry Hyde, 2nd Earl of Clarendon, appointed lord lieutenant of Ireland
42	8 Jan 1687	Richard Talbot, 1st Earl of Tyrconnell, appointed lord deputy of Ireland
43–44	1688	His regiment sent to England to protect James II
44	13 Feb 1689	Accession of William and Mary, succeeding James II
44	12 Mar 1689	James II landed at Kinsale, Ireland.
44	31 Jul 1689	Defeated at the Battle of Newtownbutler
45	1 Jul 1690	Fought at the Battle of the Boyne
45–46	Autumn 1690	Went to France to report the raise of the Siege of Limerick
56	16 Sep 1701	James II died at Saint-Germain-en-Laye.
57	8 Mar 1702	Accession of Anne, succeeding William III
59–60	1704	Started writing the Mémoires du comte de Grammont
62	30 Jan 1707	Friend Gramont died in Paris.
63	Mar 1708	Said to have taken part in the attempted invasion, but only Richard went
63	3 Jun 1708	Sister Elizabeth died in Paris.
68	11 Apr 1713	Peace of Utrecht ended the War of the Spanish Succession
68–69	1713	Gramont's Memoirs published anonymously
69	1 Aug 1714	Accession of George I, succeeding Anne
70	1 Sep 1715	Death of Louis XIV; Regency until the majority of Louis XV
71	22 Dec 1715	James III landed in Scotland during the Jacobite rising of 1715.
72–73	Dec 1717	Brother Richard died at Poussay, Lorraine.
74	20 Apr 1719	Died at Saint-Germain-en-Laye

== Works ==
Hamilton came from an English-speaking family (Note: His father was entirely Scottish, his mother half Irish and half English) but chose to write in French. Despite his origins he excelled in that light and elegant badinage considered typically French.

Hamilton's works were well known in the 18th century. Voltaire and La Harpe mention him honourably. Today, he is mainly known for a single book: the Mémoires de la vie du comte de Grammont, the only work published while he was alive. Hamilton also wrote at least five tales and many poems, songs, epistles, and letters (ordered by year of publication):

- 1713 Mémoires de la vie du comte de Grammont [Memoirs of the Life of Count Grammont] (Cologne: Pierre Marteau), read online in French or English
- 1730 Le Bélier [The Ram] (Paris: Josse), read online in French or English
- 1730 Histoire de Fleur d'Epine [Thornflower Story] (Paris: Josse), read online in French or English
- 1730 Les quatre Facardins [The Four Facardins] (Paris: Josse), read online in French or English
- 1731 in Œuvres mêlées en prose et en vers [Miscellaneous works in prose and verse] (Paris: Josse):
  - De l'usage de la vie dans la vieillesse [On the Use of Life in Old Age], p. 63 of Poésies [Poems], read online
  - Sur l'agonie du feu roi d'Angleterre [On the Agony of the Late King of England], p. 66 of Poésies [Poems], read online
  - Epistle à monsieur le comte de Grammont [Epistle to Count Gramont], p. 1 of Epitres et lettres, read online in French or English
  - Zénéyde, read online in French or English
- 1776 L'Enchanteur Faustus [The Enchanter Faustus], read online in French or English

=== Gramont's memoirs ===
The Mémoires de la vie du comte de Grammont were originally planned to cover Gramont's entire life but were cut short so that they end with his marriage. Hamilton pretended the memoirs were dictated to him by Gramont. He started work in 1704 and completed them in 1710. For Gramont's life up to his arrival in London, Gramont was Hamilton's only source. He may have jotted this part down more or less how Gramont told it. The second, "English", part seems to be Hamilton's work. The subtitle of the first edition "L'histore amoureuse de la cour d'Angleterre" (lovelife of the English court) pertains to this part, for which Hamilton had Gramont, who died in 1707, and Elizabeth, who died in 1708, as witnesses. Hamilton's brothers James and George, important characters of the second part, had died in 1673 and 1676 respectively.

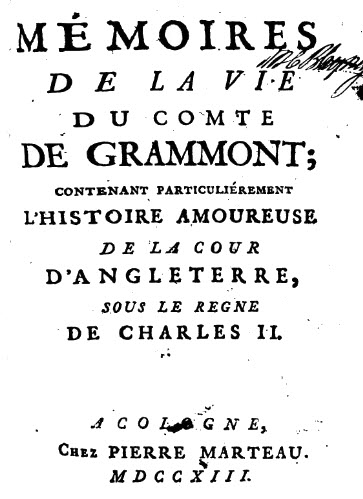
Title page of the 1713 edition

The book was a bestseller and remains a classic of French literature. It is still admired for its graceful and elegant language. The memoirs were written to amuse and entertain and sometimes depart from the correct chronological order. The book situates itself at the cross-roads between memoirs, biography, and fiction.

The memoirs were first circulated in manuscript and then published anonymously in 1713, without the author's consent. The imprint says: Cologne by Pierre Marteau, a pseudonym often used for disreputable books. It might have been published in Holland, or at Rouen. In 1817 the Catholic Church inscribed the book on the Index Librorum Prohibitorum. Early French editions often deformed the English names. Horace Walpole, a great admirer, corrected them in his Strawberry Hill edition of 1772.

The first English translation, by Abel Boyer, had followed in hot pursuit in 1714. Boyer, fearing an uproar, hid the persons' identities behind their initials. Many new or amended translations were published in due course. W. Maddison published one in 1793. Walter Scott amended an English translation in 1809 and again in 1811. Henry Vizetelly published another revised translation in 1889. Peter Quennell retranslated the memoirs in 1930 (read online).

=== Tales ===
Hamilton's tales (contes) were inspired by the fairy tales that became popular in France in the 1690s (Note: Charles Perrault published his fairy tales in 1697, but Marie-Jeanne L'Héritier published hers in 1695.) and by the Arabian Nights, published between 1704 and 1708 by Antoine Galland. Hamilton's tales are their parodies or fan fiction. The characters' adventures are often extravagant. Hamilton likes to use multiple narrators, who may tell the same events from different points of view.

His tales influenced Voltaire and Crébillon the younger in the 18th century. The tale Fleur d'Epine has been praised by La Harpe for its charming truths and its moral. Montégut called it "the most beautiful fairy tale written in France". George Saintsbury maintains that Hamilton's tales have more literary merit than his fanous memoirs.

Zénéyde (read online), written about 1696, starts as a letter to "Madame de P.", in which Hamilton criticises James II's exile court and then escapes into fiction by meeting a nymph at the Seine. The nymph, called Zénéyde, tells her life. Her father was the Roman emperor Maximus and her mother a daughter of the Frankish king Clodio. She was to marry Childeric but was caught by Genserich at Aquileia. At that point the nymph is overcome by emotion and a beautiful brunette takes over as story teller. The text stops here as Hamilton left Zénéyde incomplete. (Note: The suite of Zénéyde, imagined by the Duc de Lévis, tells us how she meets Tigrane, prince of Armenia, travels to France to marry Childeric, is bewitched by Alboflède on an island in the Seine; how Alboflède kills Tigrane and almost Zénéide too, and how she is saved by the intervention of the river god and becomes a nymph of the Seine. Hamilton awakes all wet on the bank of the Seine (read online).)

Le Bélier (read online), written in 1705, gives an etymology for "Pontalie", the name his sister Elizabeth invented for Les Moulineaux, her house at Versailles. The story starts in verse and then continues in prose. A giant called Moulineaux has an ingenious ram. His neighbour, a druide, has a beautiful daughter called Alie. The giant wants to marry Alie, but she is in love with the prince of Noisy. Her father protects her by surrounding his castle with water. The ram builds a bridge across it. This is Alie's bridge, or Pont-Alie. After many detours full of comical and absurd inventions the ram, who is really the prince of Noisy, marries Alie. Voltaire praised the introduction in verse, and mentioned in 1729 that Josse was printing the Bélier. It was the first of Hamilton's tales to be published and must have been a success as Josse went on to publish two more of them and the first collection of his works, Œuvres mêlées en prose et en vers.

Fleur d'Épine (read online) shares the frame of Arabian Nights and starts with a dialogue between Scheherazade and her sister Dinarzade. Dinarzade tells the sultan a story with the condition that he must spare Scheherazade's life should he interrupt that story. The sultan agrees and Fleur d'epine is this story.

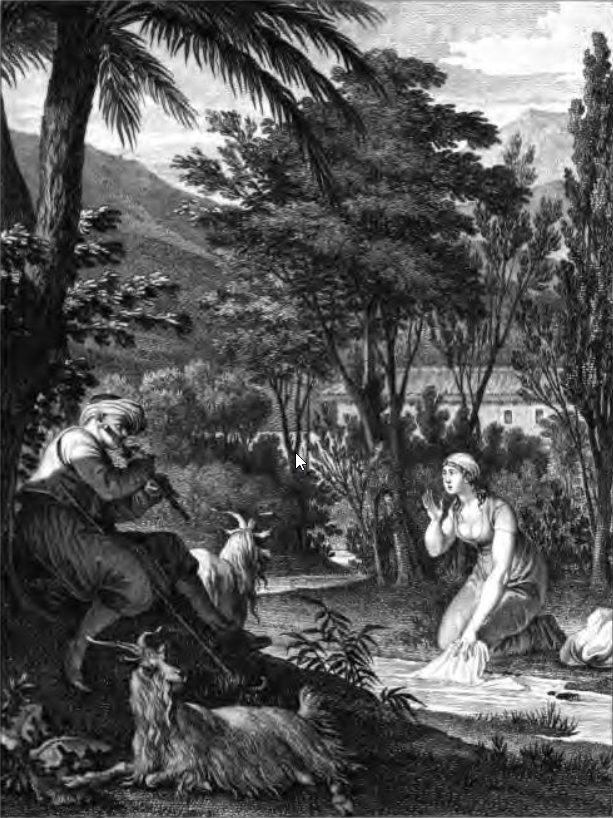
Fleur d'Epine listens to Tarare.

The story starts with the eyes of Luisante, the daughter of the caliph of Kashmir, that kill men and blind women. A prince calling himself "Tarare" contacts the sorceress Serena, who agrees to help but demands that he must free Fleur d'Epine, held by the witch Dentue. Tarare travels to Dentue's house. He meets Fleur d'Epine posing as a shepherd. He frees her from Dentue and they return to Kashmir. On the way he tells her how he and his brother Phenix went to seek adventures. Serena gives Tarare the remedy that cures Luisante's eyes. The caliph wants him to marry Luisante and fill his palace with baby Tarares. At the mention of "baby Tarares" the sultan interrupts Dinarzade and Scheherazade's life is safe. Dinarzade continues her story: Tarare marries Fleur d'Epine, whereas Phenix marries Luisante. Phenix then tells his adventures which overlap with those of his brother.

Les quatre Facardins (read online) tells the adventures of three men, all called Facardin: Facardin of Trebizond, the handsome Facardin, and the tall Facardin. Hamilton left the story incomplete and never mentions the fourth Facardin. Saintsbury considers it the best of Hamilton's tales. Facardin of Trebizond tells the story. He meets the handsome Facardin who tells his adventures on the Lions' Island and on Mount Atlas. He seeks adventures to become worthy of Mousseline. Facardin of Trebizond then meets Cristalline who is the lady of the rings from Arabian nights. She tells her life in which she was married to a genie but loved the tall Facardin. Facardin of Trebizond delivers Cristalline from the genie and they meet the tall Facardin. The story breaks off at that point. (Note: The suite of the Quatre Facardins, imagined by the Duc de Lévis, continues the story told by Facardin of Trebizond. Mousseline appears and Cristalline's genie is eaten by a crocodile. Facardin of Trebizond reads his mother's memoirs, in which she explains that the four Facardins are brothers but by different fathers and that the fourth Facardin appeared in form of a monkey. (read online).)

L'Enchanteur Faustus (read online) tells how Faust conjures up Helen of Troy, Cleopatra, Fair Rosamond, and other beauties to appear before Queen Elizabeth of England. Contrary to Hamilton's other tales, this one is linear and easy to follow. Hamilton dedicated it to his niece Margaret, his brother John's daughter.

Hamilton's tales were circulated privately as manuscripts during his lifetime. The first three were published individually in Paris in 1730, ten years after the author's death. A collection of his works, Œuvres mêlées en prose et en vers, published in 1731, contains the unfinished Zénéyde. L'Enchanteur Faustus was published belatedly in 1776 but might have been written much earlier, probably even before the memoirs.

=== Other works ===
Hamilton also wrote songs and exchanged amusing verses with the Duke of Berwick. He helped his niece Claude Charlotte, Gramont's daughter, who had married Henry Stafford-Howard, 1st Earl of Stafford, in 1694, to carry on a witty correspondence with Lady Mary Wortley Montagu.

== Notes and references ==
=== Sources ===
Subject matter monographs:

- Clark 1921 Anthony Hamilton: his Life and Works and his Family
- Corp 2004 in Oxford Dictionary of National Biography
- Ó Ciardha 2009a in Dictionary of Irish Biography
- Rigg 1890 in Dictionary of National Biography
- Webb 1878 in Compendium of Irish Biography
- Airy, Osmund (1886). "Butler, James, twelfth Earl and first Duke of Ormonde (1610–1688)". In Lee, Sidney (ed.). Dictionary of National Biography. Vol. VIII. New York: MacMillan and Co. pp. 52–60. OCLC 8544105.
- Atkinson, C. T. (1946). "Charles II's regiments in France, 1672–1678: Part III". Journal of the Society for Army Historical Research. 24 (100): 161–172. JSTOR 44228420. – Altenheim
- Auger, L. S. (1805). "Notice sur la vie et les ouvrages d'Hamilton" [Note on Hamilton's Life and Work]. In Auger, Louis-Simon (ed.). Œuvres complètes d'Hamilton [Complete works of Hamilton] (in French). Vol. Tome premier. Paris: Colnet, Fain, Mongie, Debray & Delaunai. pp. 1–30. OCLC 848652758.
- Barnard, Toby (2004). "Butler, James, first duke of Ormond (1610–1688)". In Matthew, Henry Colin Gray.; Harrison, Brian (eds.). Oxford Dictionary of National Biography. Vol. 9. New York: Oxford University Press. pp. 153–163. ISBN 0-19-861359-8.
- Boulger, Demetrius Charles (1911). The Battle of the Boyne. London: Martin Secker. OCLC 1041056932.
- Boyle, John (1879) [1st pub. 1867]. The Battle-fields of Ireland, from 1688 to 1691 (Fourth ed.). New York: Robert Coddington.
- Brownell, Morris R. (2001). The Prime Minister of Taste: A portrait of Horace Walpole. New Haven: Yale University Press. ISBN 0-300-08716-0.
- Brunet, Gustave (1883). "Introduction". Mémoires du chevalier de Grammont (in French). Paris: G Charpentier. pp. i–xliv.
- Burke, Bernard; Burke, Ashworth Peter (1915). A Genealogical and Heraldic History of the Peerage and Baronetage, the Privy Council, Knightage and Companionage (77th ed.). London: Harrison. OCLC 1155471554.
- Carte, Tho. (1851) [1st pub. 1736]. The Life of James Duke of Ormond. Vol. III (New ed.). Oxford: Oxford University Press. OCLC 1086656347. – 1643 to 1660
- Childs, John (2007). The Williamite Wars in Ireland 1688–1691. London: Hambledon Continuum Press. ISBN 978-1-85285-573-4. – (Preview)
- Chisholm, Hugh, ed. (1910a). "Gramont, Philibert, Comte de" . Encyclopædia Britannica. Vol. 12 (11th ed.). Cambridge University Press. pp. 332–333.
- Chisholm, Hugh, ed. (1910b). "Hamilton, Anthony" . Encyclopædia Britannica. Vol. 12 (11th ed.). Cambridge University Press. p. 884.
- Clark, Ruth (1921). Anthony Hamilton: his Life and Works and his Family. London: John Lane. OCLC 459281163.
- Coffey, Diarmid (1914). O'Neill and Ormond – A Chapter of Irish History. Dublin: Maunsel & Company. OCLC 906164979.
- Cogan, A. (1870). The Diocese of Meath Ancient and Modern. Vol. II. Dublin: Joseph Dollard. OCLC 1043021954. – 1554 to 1790
- Corish, Patrick J. (1976). "Chapter XII: Ormond, Rinuccini, and the confederates". In Moody, Theodore William; Martin, F. X.; Byrne, Francis John (eds.). A New History of Ireland. Vol. III. Oxford: Oxford University Press. pp. 317–335. ISBN 978-0-19-820242-4. – 1645 to 1649
- Corp, Edward (2004a). "Hamilton, Anthony [Antoine], Count Hamilton in the French nobility (1644/5?–1719)". In Matthew, Colin; Harrison, Brian (eds.). Oxford Dictionary of National Biography. Vol. 24. New York: Oxford University Press. pp. 766–768. ISBN 0-19-861374-1.
- Corp, Edward (2004b). "Hamilton, Elizabeth, Countess de Gramont". In Matthew, Colin; Harrison, Brian (eds.). Oxford Dictionary of National Biography. Vol. 24. New York: Oxford University Press. pp. 786–787. ISBN 0-19-861374-1.
- Corp, Edward (2004c). A Court in Exile: The Stuarts in France, 1689-1718. Cambridge: Cambridge University Press. ISBN 0-521-58462-0.
- Courcelles (1823). Dictionnaire historique et biographique des généraux français [Historic and Biographic Dictionary of French Generals] (in French). Vol. Tome huitième. Paris: chez l'auteur. – Monteq to Riva
- D'Alton, John (1861). Illustrations, Historical and Genealogical, of King James's Irish Army List, 1689. Vol. II (2nd enlarged ed.). London: John Russell Smith. OCLC 557976252. – Cavalry
- Dalton, Charles (1896). English Army Lists and Commission Registers, 1661 – 1714. Vol. II. London: Eyre & Spottiswoode. OCLC 1044569104. – 1685 to 1689
- Dangeau (1857a). Conches, Feuillet de (ed.). Journal du marquis de Dangeau [Diary of the Marquess of Dangeau] (in French). Vol. Tome Onzième. Paris: Firmin Didot Frères. OCLC 310446765. – 1706 to 1707
- Dangeau (1857b). Conches, Feuillet de (ed.). Journal du marquis de Dangeau [Diary of the Marquess of Dangeau] (in French). Vol. Tome Douzième. Paris: Firmin Didot Frères. OCLC 310446765. – 1707 to 1709
- Dangeau (1859). Conches, Feuillet de (ed.). Journal du marquis de Dangeau [Diary of the Marquess of Dangeau] (in French). Vol. Tome Dix-septième. Paris: Firmin Didot Frères. OCLC 310446765. – 1717 to 1719
- Doherty, Richard (1998). The Williamite War in Ireland. Dublin: Four Courts. ISBN 1-85182-375-1.
- Drabble, Margaret (1985). The Oxford Companion to English Literature. Oxford: Oxford University Press. ISBN 0-19-866130-4.
- Dulck, Jean (1989). "Anthony Hamilton, Mémoire de Philibert de Grammont". Revue de la Société d'études anglo-américaines des XVIIe et XVIIIe siècles (in French). 28: 7–20. doi:10.3406/xvii.
- Dulon, J. (1897). Jacques II Stuart, sa Famille et le Jacobites à Saint-Germain-en-Laye [James II Stuart, his Family and the Jacobites at Saint-Germain-en-Laye] (in French). Saint-Germain-en-Laye: Ch. Lévêque. OCLC 313394287.
- Elliott, Marianne (2000). The Catholics of Ulster, a History. London: Allen Lane The Penguin Press. ISBN 0-713-99464-9.
- Ellis, Peter Berresford (1978). The Boyne Water: the Battle of the Boyne, 1690. Belfast: The Blackstaff Press. ISBN 0-85640-419-5.
- Foisset ainé (1854). "Perrault (Charles)". In Michaud, Louis Gabriel (ed.). Biographie universelle ancienne et moderne (in French). Vol. Tome trente-deuxième (Nouvelle ed.). Paris: Madame C. Desplaces. pp. 529–531. OCLC 49140554.
- Fraser, Antonia (2007) [1st pub.2006]. Love and Louis XIV. London: Phoenix. ISBN 978-0-7538-2293-7.
- Fryde, E. B.; Greenway, D. E.; Porter, S.; Roy, I., eds. (1986). Handbook of British Chronology. Royal Historical Society Guides and Handbooks, No. 2 (3rd ed.). London: Offices of the Royal Historical Society. ISBN 0-86193-106-8. – (for timeline)
- Gardiner, Samuel R. (1895). A Student's History of England: From the Earliest Times to 1885. Vol. II (New ed.). London: Longmans, Green, and Co. OCLC 499456578. – 1509 to 1689
- G. E. C. (1889). Complete Peerage of England, Scotland, Ireland, Great Britain and the United Kingdom, Extant, Extinct, or Dormant. Vol. II (1st ed.). London: George Bell and Sons. – Bra to C (for Butler)
- G. E. C. (1895). Complete Peerage of England, Scotland, Ireland, Great Britain and the United Kingdom, Extant, Extinct, or Dormant. Vol. VI (1st ed.). London: George Bell and Sons. OCLC 1180818801. – N to R (for Ormond)
- G. E. C. (1896). Complete Peerage of England, Scotland, Ireland, Great Britain and the United Kingdom, Extant, Extinct, or Dormant. Vol. VII (1st ed.). London: George Bell and Sons. OCLC 1180891114. – S to T (for Stafford and Tyrconnell)
- G. E. C. (1903). Complete Baronetage, 1611 to 1800. Vol. III (1st ed.). Exeter: William Pollard & Co. OCLC 866278985. – 1649 to 1664
- G. E. C. (1910). Gibbs, Vicary (ed.). The Complete Peerage of England, Scotland, Ireland, Great Britain and the United Kingdom, Extant, Extinct, or Dormant. Vol. I (2nd ed.). London: The St Catherine Press. OCLC 1042385438. – Ab-Adam to Basing (for Abercorn family tree)
- Gibney, John (October 2009). "King, Sir William". In McGuire, James; Quinn, James (eds.). Dictionary of Irish Biography (online ed.).
- Gleeson, Dermot F. (1947). Roscrea. A History of the Catholic Parish of Roscrea. Dublin: Sign of the Three Candles. OCLC 7062340. – Does not seem to be available online
- Goodwin, Gordon (1908). "Introduction". In Goodwin, Gordon (ed.). Memoirs of Count Grammont. Vol. I. Edinburgh: John Grant. pp. vii–xxxii. OCLC 1048813157.
- Goubert, Pierre (1984). Initiation à l'histoire de la France [Initiation to the History of France] (in French). Paris: Fayard-Tallandier. ISBN 978-2-235-01484-7. – (for timeline)
- Haile, Martin (1905). Queen Mary of Modena, her Life and her Letters. London: J. M. Dent & Co. OCLC 457559782.
- Hamilton, Anthony (1713). Mémoires de la vie du comte de Grammont [Memoirs of Count Grammont] (in French). Cologne: Pierre Marteau. OCLC 1135254578. – Princeps
- Hamilton, Anthony (1811). Mémoires de la vie du comte de Grammont [Memoirs of Count Grammont] (in French). Vol. II. London: William Miller. OCLC 719396809.
- Hamilton, Antoine (1812). Renouard, Antoine-Augustin (ed.). Œuvres du comte Antoine Hamilton [Count Hamilton's Works] (in French). Vol. Tome second. Paris: Antoine-Augustin Renouard. OCLC 5592989. – Fleur d’Épine, Bélier, Facardins, Zénéide & Faustus (for the illustration)
- Hamilton, Anthony (1849). Fairy Tales and Romances. Translated by Lewis, Matthew Gregory; Ryde, Henry T.; Kenney, Charles. London: Henry G. Bohn. OCLC 1003871429.
- Hamilton, Anthony (1889). Memoirs of the Count Gramont. Vol. I. Translated by Vizetelly, Henry. London: Vizetelly & Co. OCLC 20472183.
- Handley, Stuart (2004). "FitzJames, James (1650/51–1712)". In Matthew, Colin; Harrison, Brian (eds.). Oxford Dictionary of National Biography. Vol. 19. New York: Oxford University Press. pp. 881–884. ISBN 0-19-861369-5.
- Hartmann, Cyril Hughes (1924). La Belle Stuart. London: George Routledge & Sons. OCLC 1035924728.
- Hartmann, Cyril Hughes (1930a). "The Chronology of the Memoirs of Comte de Gramont". Memoirs of the Comte de Gramont. London: E. P. Dutton and Company. pp. 370–378. OCLC 1150292676. – Appendix by Hartmann to Hamilton's Memoirs translated by Quennell
- Hartmann, Cyril Hughes (1930b). "Introduction". Memoirs of the Comte de Gramont. New York: E. P. Dutton and Company. OCLC 1150292676.
- Hayes, Richard (1943). "Biographical Dictionary of Irishmen in France. Part VII". Irish Historical Studies. XXXII (127): 379–391. JSTOR 30100529. – Hely to Hooke (for Hamilton)
- Hayes-McCoy, G. A. (1990) [1st pub. 1969]. Irish Battles: A Military History of Ireland. Belfast: The Appletree Press. ISBN 0-86281-250-X.
- Historical Manuscripts Commission (1902). Calendar of the Stuart Papers. Vol. I. London: His/Her Majesty's Stationery Office. OCLC 1041616450.
- Historical Manuscripts Commission (1906). Calendar of the Manuscripts of the Marquess of Ormonde K.P. Preserved at Kilkenny Castle. New Series. Vol. IV. London: His/Her Majesty's Stationery Office. OCLC 460421809.
- Hogan, James (1934). Négociations de M. Le Comte d'Avaux en Irlande 1689–1690 [Negotiations of the Count d'Avaux in Ireland] (in French). Dublin: Stationery Office. OCLC 230600157.
- Humphreys, Jennett; Wynne, S. M. (2004). "Bulkeley [née Stuart], Lady Sophia (fl. 1660–1718)". In Matthew, Henry Colin Gray.; Harrison, Brian (eds.). Oxford Dictionary of National Biography. Vol. 8. New York: Oxford University Press. pp. 579–580. ISBN 0-19-861411-X.
- Janmart de Brouillant, Léonce (1888). L'état de la liberté de la presse en France aux XVII et XVIII siècles – Histoire de Pierre du Marteau imprimeur à Cologne [The State of the Freedom of the Press in France in the 17th and 18th Century – Meaning of Pierre du Marteau Printer in Cologne] (in French). Paris: Maison Quantin. OCLC 48730886.
- Jones, George Hilton (1982). "The Irish Fright of 1688: Real Violence and Imagined Massacre". Bulletin of the Institute of Historical Research. 55 (132): 148–153. doi:10.1111/j.1468-2281.1982.tb01154.x. – (1st page abstract only)
- Jourdain (1856). "Galland (Antoine)". In Michaud, Louis Gabriel (ed.). Biographie universelle ancienne et moderne (in French). Vol. Tome quinzième (Nouvelle ed.). Paris: Madame C. Desplaces. pp. 438–441. OCLC 49140554.
- Jullien, Adolphe (1885). La comédie à la cour - Les théatres de société royale pendant les siècle dernier (in French). Paris: Firmin-Didot. OCLC 1047497240.
- Jusserand, J. J. (1892). A French Ambassador at the Court of Charles the Second: le comte de Comminges. London: T. Fisher & Unwin. OCLC 1045606296.
- King, William (1730) [1st pub. 1691]. The state of the Protestants of Ireland under the Late King James's Government. Dublin: George Risk, George Ewing, and William smith. OCLC 85864076.
- Kissenberth, Wilhelm (1907). Antoine Hamilton sein Leben und seine werke (PhD) (in German). Universität Rostock.
- La Chenaye-Desbois (1774). Dictionnaire de la noblesse (in French). Vol. VII (2nd ed.). Paris: Antoine Boudet. OCLC 491609675. – GAB to HAZ (for Hamilton)
- La Chenaye-Desbois (1866a). Dictionnaire de la noblesse [Dictionary of Nobility] (in French). Vol. Tome neuvième (3rd ed.). Paris: Schlesinger Frères. OCLC 797014713. – GAR to GUE (for Gramont)
- La Chenaye-Desbois (1866b). Dictionnaire de la noblesse [Dictionary of Nobility] (in French). Vol. Tome dixième (3rd ed.). Paris: Schlesinger Frères. OCLC 797014713. – GUE to IZA (for Harlay)
- Laffont-Bompiani (1994). "Hamilton, Anthony" [New Dictionary of Authors of All Times and Countries]. In Laffont, Robert (ed.). Nouveau dictionnaire des auteurs de tous les temps et tous les pays (in French). Vol. II. Paris: R. Laffont. pp. 1377–1378. ISBN 2-221-07717-2. – G to M (for Hamilton)
- LaHarpe, J. F. (1813) [1st pub. 1803]. Lycée ou cours de littérature ancienne et moderne [Lyceum or course of literature] (in French). Vol. Tome septième (Nouvelle édition ed.). Paris: Amable Costes. OCLC 1049693041.
- Lenihan, Maurice (1866). Limerick: its History and Antiquities. Dublin: Hodges, Smith, and Co. OCLC 1048327570.
- Lewis, W. H. (1958). Assault on Olympus: The rise of the House of Gramont between 1604 and 1678. New York: Harcourt, Brace & Co. OCLC 1147740696.
- Longueville, Thomas (1907). Marshal Turenne. London: Longmans, Green & Co. OCLC 665146146.
- Louis XIV (1806). Œuvres de Louis XIV [Works of Louis XIV] (in French). Vol. V. Paris: Treuttel & Würtz. OCLC 311560829.
- Luttrell, Narcissus (1857). A Brief Historical Relation of State Affairs from September 1678 to April 1714. Vol. VI. Oxford: Oxford University Press. – 1705 to 1714
- Lynn, John A. (1999). The Wars of Louis XIV 1667–1714. Harlow, England: Longman. ISBN 978-0-582-05629-9.
- Mahaffy, Robert Pentland, ed. (1900). Calendar of the State Papers Relating to Ireland, of the Reign of Charles I. 1633–1647. London: Public Record Office.
- Manning, Conleth (2001). "The Two Sir George Hamiltons and their Connections with the Castles of Roscrea and Nenagh" (PDF). Tipperary Historical Journal: 149–154.
- McGuire, James (October 2009). "Talbot, Richard". In McGuire, James; Quinn, James (eds.). Dictionary of Irish Biography (online ed.).
- Merriam-Webster (1997). Merriam-Webster's Geographical Dictionary (Third ed.). Springfield, Massachusetts: Merriam-Webster. ISBN 0-87779-546-0. – (for place name pronunciation)
- Francisque-Michel (1862). Les Écossais en France [The Scots in France] (in French). Vol. Deuxième volume. London: Trübner & Cie. OCLC 562743883. – Chapters XXIII to XL
- Millar, A. H. (1890). "Hamilton, James, first Earl of Abercorn (d.1617)". In Lee, Sidney (ed.). Dictionary of National Biography. Vol. XXIV. New York: MacMillan and Co. pp. 176–177. OCLC 8544105.
- Miller, Peggy (1971). James: Old Pretender. Lanham MD: St. Martin's Press. ISBN 9780049230569.
- Montégut, Jean-Baptiste Joseph Émile (1862). "Des fées et de leur littérature en France" [About fairies and their literature in France]. Revue de deux mondes (in French). 38: 671.
- O'Callaghan, John Cornelius (1854). History of the Irish Brigades in the Service of France. New York: P. O'Shea Publisher. OCLC 1046538374.
- Ó Ciardha, Éamonn (October 2009a). "Hamilton, Anthony (Antoine)". In McGuire, James; Quinn, James (eds.). Dictionary of Irish Biography (online ed.).
- Ó Ciardha, Éamonn (October 2009b). "Hamilton, Richard". In McGuire, James; Quinn, James (eds.). Dictionary of Irish Biography (online ed.).
- O'Sullivan, M. D. (1983) [1st pub. 1942]. Old Galloway: the history of a Norman colony in Ireland. Galway: Kennys Bookshops and Art Galleries. ISBN 978-0-906312-21-6.
- Parfaict, Claude (1756). Dictionnaire des théatres de Paris [Dictionary of the Paris Theatres] (in French). Vol. Tome cinquième. Paris: Rozet. OCLC 1042991110.
- Paul, James Balfour (1904). The Scots Peerage, Founded on Wood's Edition of Sir Robert Douglas's Peerage of Scotland. Vol. I. Edinburgh: David Douglas. OCLC 505064285. – Abercorn to Balmerino
- Perceval-Maxwell, Michael (2004). "Butler [née Preston] Elizabeth, duchess of Ormond and suo jure Lady Dingwall (1615–1684)". In Matthew, Henry Colin Gray.; Harrison, Brian (eds.). Oxford Dictionary of National Biography. Vol. 9. New York: Oxford University Press. pp. 130–131. ISBN 0-19-861359-8.
- Piganiol de La Force (1765). Description historique de la Ville de Paris et de ses environs (in French). Vol. Tome quatrième (Nouvelle ed.). Paris: Librairies Associées. OCLC 832565452. – St Martin, Grève, St Paul, St Avoye, Temple, St Antoine
- Public Record Office (1972). Calendar of State Papers, Preserved in the Public Record Office, Domestic Series, James II, June 1687 to February 1689. Vol. III. London: His/Her Majesty's Stationery Office. ISBN 0-11-440021-0. – 1687 to 1689
- Raunié, Émile (1884). Mémoires et Réflexions du Marquis de La Fare [Memoirs and Reflections of the Marquess of La Fare] (in French). Paris: G. Charpentier.
- Richards, Alfred E. (1908). "L'Enchanteur Faustus". Modern Language Notes. 23 (4): 119–121. doi:10.2307/2916943. JSTOR 2916943.
- Rigg, J. M. (1890). "Hamilton, Anthony (1646?–1720)". In Lee, Sidney (ed.). Dictionary of National Biography. Vol. XXIV. New York: MacMillan and Co. pp. 135–137. OCLC 8544105.
- Rousseau, André-M. (1968). "À la découverte d'Antoine Hamilton, conteur" [Discovering Antoine Hamilton, storyteller] (PDF). Études littéraires (in French). 1 (2): 185–195. doi:10.7202/500018ar.
- Sainte-Beuve, C. A. (1904). Portraits of the Seventeenth Century. Translated by Wormeley, Katherine P. London: The Knickerbocker Press. OCLC 1051753420. – A partial translation of the Causeries de lundi
- Saint-Simon (1895). Boislisle, A. de (ed.). Mémoires du duc de Saint-Simon [Memoirs of the Duke of Saint-Simon] (in French). Vol. Tome onzième. Paris: Hachette. OCLC 1068033585. – 1703
- Saint-Simon (1899). Boislisle, A. de (ed.). Mémoires du duc de Saint-Simon [Memoirs of the Duke of Saint-Simon] (in French). Vol. Tome quatorzième. Paris: Hachette. OCLC 1068033585. – 1706 to 1707
- Saint-Simon (1910). Boislisle, A. de (ed.). Mémoires du duc de Saint-Simon [Memoirs of the Duke of Saint-Simon] (in French). Vol. Tome vingt et deuxième. Paris: Hachette. OCLC 1068033585. – 1711 to 1712
- Saint-Simon (1929). Boislisle, A. de (ed.). Mémoires du duc de Saint-Simon [Memoirs of the Duke of Saint-Simon] (in French). Vol. Tome quinzième (3rd ed.). Paris: Hachette. – 1707 to 1708
- Saintsbury, George (1891). Essays on French Novelists (second ed.). London: Percival and Co. OCLC 1189639343.
- Saintsbury, George (1892). A Short History of French Literature (fourth ed.). Oxford: Clarendon Press. OCLC 7058659.
- Sayous, A. (1853). Histoire de la littérature française à l'étranger [History of French literature abroad] (in French). Vol. Deuxième. Paris: J. Cherbuliez. OCLC 1003959870. – 17th century
- Scott, Walter (1846). "Biographical Sketch of Anthony Hamilton". Memoirs of Court of Charles the Second by Count Grammont. London: Henry George Bohn. pp. 3–17. OCLC 870885892.
- Sergeant, Philip W. (1913). Little Jennings and Fighting Dick Talbot: A Life of the Duke and Duchess of Tyrconnel. Vol. I. London: Hutchinson. OCLC 474495830. – 1643 to 1685
- Silke, John J. (1976). "Chapter XXIII: The Irish abroad, 1534–1691". In Moody, Theodore William; Martin, F. X.; Byrne, Francis John (eds.). A New History of Ireland. Vol. III. Oxford: Oxford University Press. pp. 587–633. ISBN 978-0-1982-0242-4.
- Simms, J. G. (1969). Jacobite Ireland, 1685–91. London: Routledge & Kegan Paul. ISBN 978-0-7100-6446-2.
- Simms, J. G. (1976). "Chapter XIX: The War of the Two Kings". In Moody, Theodore William; Martin, F. X.; Byrne, Francis John (eds.). A New History of Ireland. Vol. III. Oxford: Oxford University Press. pp. 478–544. ISBN 978-0-1982-0242-4.
- Shepherd, Robert (1990). Ireland's Fate: The Boyne and After. London: Aurum Press. ISBN 1-85410-101-3.
- Stanley, J.; Newton, Is.; Ellis, Jn. (1702). "Report of the Officers of the Mint about the Preservation of the Coyne". – T 1/80.105, National Archives, Kew, Richmond, Surrey, UK
- Vizetelly, Henry (1889). "Anthony Hamilton". Memoirs of the Count Gramont. Vol. I. London: Vizetelly & Co. pp. xiii–xxii. OCLC 20472183.
- Voltaire (1877). "Le temple du goût" [The Temple of Taste]. Œuvres complètes de Voltaire (in French). Vol. 8. Paris: Garnier Frères. OCLC 697603790.
- Voltaire (1880). "Correspondance". Œuvres complètes de Voltaire (in French). Vol. 33. Paris: Garnier Frères. OCLC 697603790.
- Voltaire (1922). Le siècle de Louis XIV [The Century of Louis XIV] (in French). Vol. Tome second (Nouvelle édition ed.). Paris: Garnier Frères. OCLC 797039184.
- Walsh, Patrick; Doyle, T. G. (October 2009). "Hyde, Henry". In McGuire, James; Quinn, James (eds.). Dictionary of Irish Biography (online ed.).
- Warner, Ferd. (1768). History of the Rebellion and Civil-War in Ireland. Vol. II. Dublin: James William. OCLC 82770539. – 1643 to 1660 and index
- Wasser, Michael (2004). "Hamilton, James, first earl of Abercorn (1575–1618)". In Matthew, Colin; Harrison, Brian (eds.). Oxford Dictionary of National Biography. Vol. 24. New York: Oxford University Press. pp. 837–838. ISBN 0-19-861374-1.
- Wauchope, Piers (2004a). "Dongan, Thomas, second earl of Limerick (1634–1715)". In Matthew, Colin; Harrison, Brian (eds.). Oxford Dictionary of National Biography. Vol. 16. New York: Oxford University Press. pp. 523–524. ISBN 0-19-861366-0.
- Wauchope, Piers (2004b). "Hamilton, Richard (d. 1717)". In Matthew, Colin; Harrison, Brian (eds.). Oxford Dictionary of National Biography. Vol. 24. New York: Oxford University Press. pp. 888–889, right column. ISBN 0-19-861374-1.
- Webb, Alfred (1878). "Hamilton, Count Anthony". Compendium of Irish Biography. Dublin: M. H. Gill & Son. p. 241. OCLC 122693688.
- Weinreb, Ben; Hibbert, Christopher (2008). The London Encyclopædia. Bethesda, ML: Adler & Adler. ISBN 978-0-917561-07-8.
- Wheatley, Henry Benjamin (1912). "Anthony Hamilton's Mémoires de la Vie du Comte de Gramont". In Ward, A. W.; Waller, A. R. (eds.). The Cambridge History of English Literature. Vol. VIII. Cambridge: Cambridge University Press. pp. 261–264. OCLC 5186868.
- Zipes, Jack, ed. (2015). The Oxford Companion of Fairy Tales (Second ed.). Oxford: Oxford University Press. ISBN 978-0-19-968982-8.
