= Elizabeth, Countess de Gramont =

Irish restoration-court beauty (1641–1708)

Elizabeth Hamilton
- Comtesse de Gramont
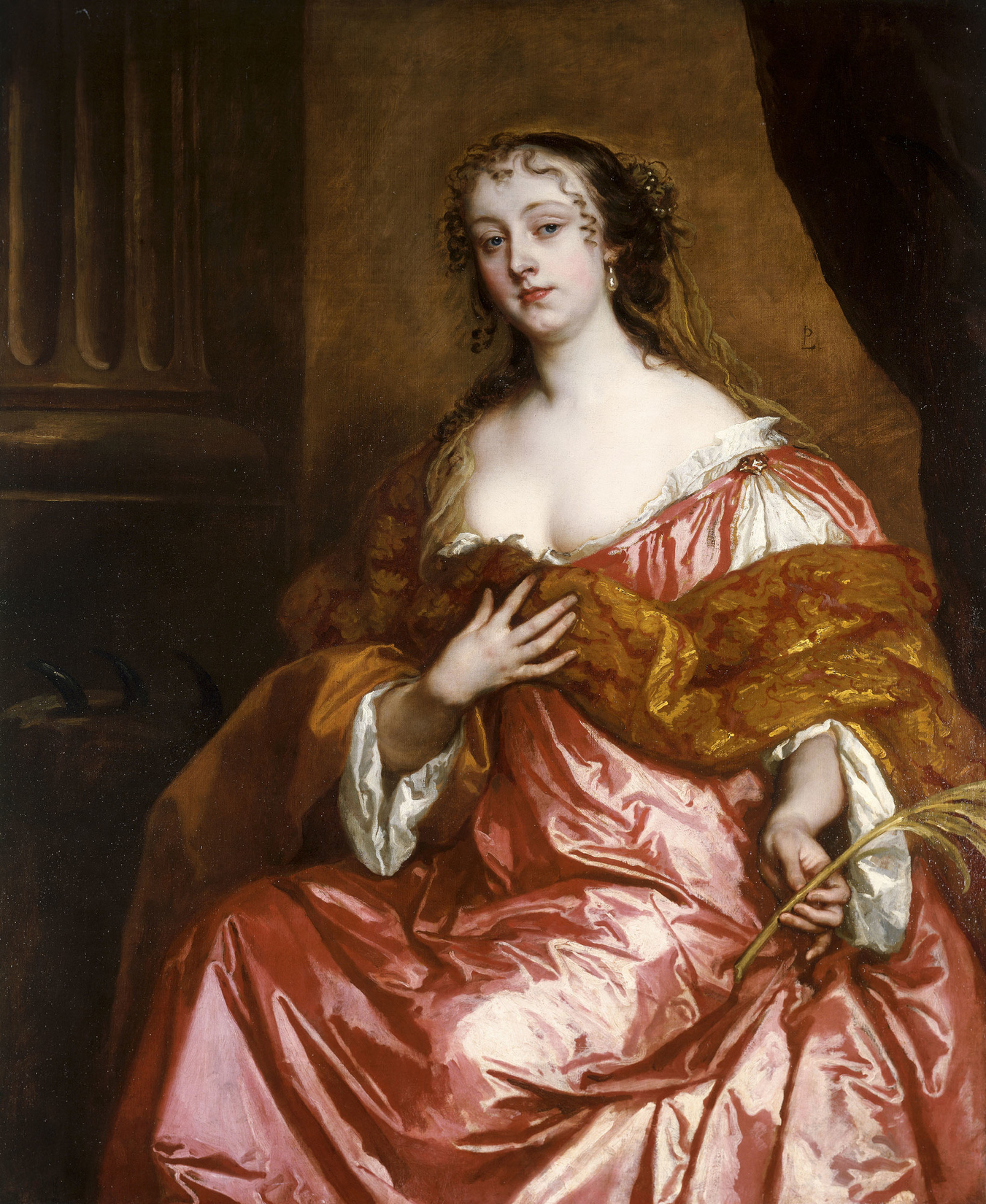
- Detail from portrait below
- Tenure: 1678–1708
- Born: Elizabeth Hamilton; 1641
- Died: 3 June 1708 (aged 66–67); Paris
- Spouse: Philibert, comte de Gramont
- Issue Detail: Claude Charlotte & Marie Élisabeth
- Father: George Hamilton, Baronet
- Mother: Mary Butler

Elizabeth, comtesse de Gramont (née Hamilton; 1641–1708), was an Irish-born courtier, first after the Restoration at the court of Charles II of England in Whitehall and later, after her marriage to Philibert de Gramont, at the court of Louis XIV where she was a lady-in-waiting to the French queen, Maria Theresa of Spain.

Known as "la belle Hamilton", she was one of the Windsor Beauties painted by Peter Lely. She appears prominently in the Mémoires du comte de Grammont, written by her brother Anthony.

== Birth and origins ==
Family tree

Elizabeth Hamilton with husband, children, parents, and other selected relatives. (Note: This family tree is partly derived from the Abercorn pedigree pictured in Cokayne. Also see the lists of siblings and children in the text.)

James; Hamilton; 1st Earl; 1575–1618	Marion; Boyd d. 1632; Recusant	Thomas; Butler; Viscount; Thurles d. 1619
Claud; 2nd Baron; H. of Strabane d. 1638	George; 1st Baronet; Donalong c. 1607 – 1679	Mary; Butler d. 1680	James; 1st Duke; Ormond; 1610–1688
James c. 1630 – 1673; Courtier	Philibert de Gramont; 1621–1707	Elizabeth; 1641–1708	Anthony c. 1645 – 1719; Writer
Henry; 1st Earl; Stafford c. 1648 – 1719	Claude; Charlotte d. 1739	Marie; Elizabeth; 1667–1729; Abbess

Legend

XXX	Subject of the article	XXX	Earls of Abercorn	XXX	Dukes of Ormond

Elizabeth was born in 1641, in Ireland, probably at Nenagh (/ˈniːnæ/), County Tipperary. (Note: Manning (2001) and Gleeson (1947) say that she and her Irish-born siblings such as Anthony might have been born at Nenagh. However, others give Roscrea as her place of birth.) She was the third child of George Hamilton and his wife Mary Butler. Her father was Scottish, the fourth son of James Hamilton, 1st Earl of Abercorn, and would in 1660 be created baronet of Donalong and Nenagh.

Her mother, Mary, was the third daughter of Thomas Butler, Viscount Thurles, and a sister of the future 1st Duke of Ormond. Her mother's family, the Butler dynasty, was Old English.

Both her parents were Catholic. They had married in 1635. Elizabeth was one of nine siblings. See James, George, Anthony, Richard, and John. (Note: Elizabeth's father's article gives a list of all the nine siblings.)

In 1640 Ormond granted Elizabeth's father the manor, castle, town, and lands of Nenagh for 31 years, in lieu of the still unpaid dowry. Nenagh was therefore where the family settled down and where Elizabeth was born.

== Irish wars ==
The Irish Rebellion of 1641 broke out in the year of her birth. The rebellion was followed by the Irish Confederate Wars (1642–1648) and the Cromwellian conquest of Ireland (1649-1653). Elizabeth, her siblings and her mother seem to have lived in the family's home in Nenagh, in the territory held by the Confederates, while her father served Ormond in the Irish army which fought against the Confederates until the Cessation signed in 1643.

However, in September 1646 Rinuccini, the papal nuncio, overthrew the Confederate Supreme Council in a coup d'état with help of Owen Roe O'Neill's Confederate Ulster Army. O'Neill led his army south to Kilkenny, the Confederate capital, where he arrived the 16th. Rinuccini then took power appointing a new Supreme Council the 26th. In the meantime, on the 17th, Ulster troops sacked Roscrea. The ulstermen had a reputation for living off the inhabitants, even friendly ones. Carte (1736) reports that "Sir G. Hamilton's lady, sister to the marquis of Ormond" was spared at Roscrea. However, it is more likely that Elizabeth, her mother, and siblings were safely at Nenagh (30 kilometres (19 mi) west of Roscrea) and that the Lady Hamilton at Roscrea was his grandaunt, the wife of George Hamilton of Greenlaw and Roscrea, not her mother.

In 1649, during the Cromwellian conquest of Ireland, her father was colonel of an infantry regiment and governor of Nenagh. He defended Nenagh Castle in November 1650 when it was attacked and captured by the Parliamentarian army under Henry Ireton on the way back from their unsuccessful siege of Limerick to their winter quarters at Kilkenny.

== French exile ==
Early in 1651, when she was about ten, her father followed Ormond into French exile. The family first went to Caen where they were accommodated for some time by Elizabeth Preston, the Marchioness of Ormond. Her father and her elder brothers, James and George, were soon employed by Charles II in various functions. She then left for Paris with her mother, who would find shelter in the convent of the Feuillantines, together with her sister Eleanor Butler, Lady Muskerry, while she was sent to boarding school at the abbey of Cistercian nuns of Port-Royal-des-Champs, near Versailles. This school had an excellent reputation and was ahead of its time by teaching in French rather than in Latin. She attended this school for seven or eight years, together with her cousin Helen Muskerry. The abbey also was a stronghold of Jansenism, a Catholic religious movement that insisted on earnestness and asceticism but which was later declared heretic for its position on grace and original sin.

Having left school, she was associated with the court in exile of Henrietta Maria, the dowager queen, Charles I's widow, who had fled to France in 1644 and had in 1657 moved to the Château de Colombes, near Paris. In March 1660 she met Sir John Reresby at the celebration of the Restoration organised by Henrietta Maria at the Palais-Royal in Paris.

== Whitehall ==
She became a member of the English court at Whitehall in 1661. She was admired as a great beauty and called "la belle Hamilton". She also became known for her judgement, charm and sensibility. She was seen as witty and careful with her words as she, reportedly, said no more than she thought. She also loved practical jokes and mischief. So she made fun of Margaret Bourke, a rich heiress, whom her cousin Lord Muskerry had married, by making her believe that she had been invited to a masquerade by the Queen and had to disguise herself as a Babylonian woman. This episode is told in the Mémoires du comte de Grammont.

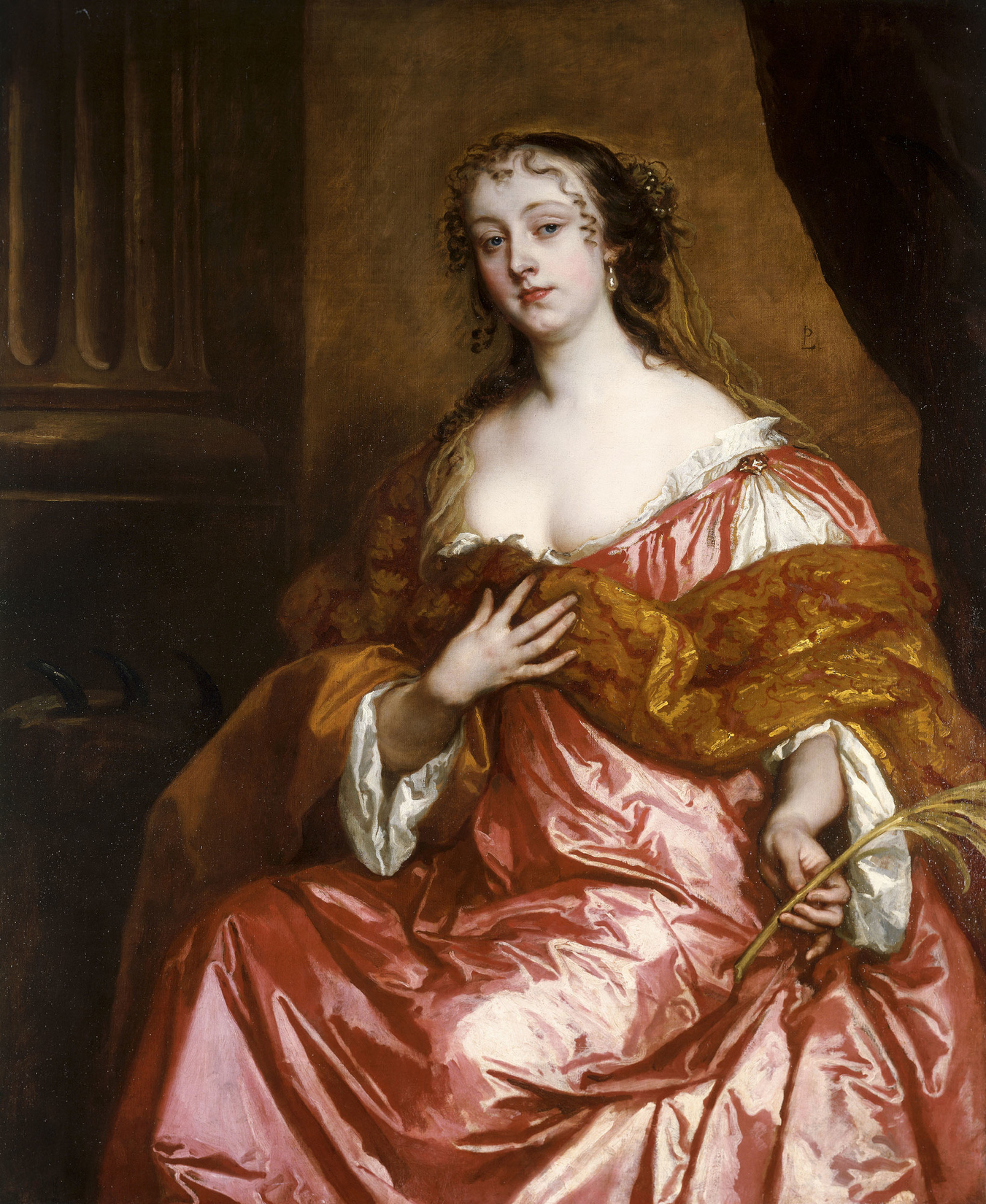
Portrait by Peter Lely, c. 1663, one of the series of Windsor Beauties. She is depicted as Saint Catherine as she holds a martyr's palm leaf in her left hand and a wheel leans against the socle of the column behind.

She was much courted at Whitehall. First of all by the Duke of Richmond whom she rejected when she found out that he would not marry her without a dowry. She also resisted the advances of Henry Jermyn, 1st Baron Dover, though reputed irresistible. She was not tempted by the thirty thousand per year of the heir of Norfolk. She rejected Charles Berkeley, 1st Earl of Falmouth. When courted by the Duke of York, the future King James II, she doubted the sincerity of his intentions as he had just married Anne Hyde in 1660.

Finally, in January 1663, appeared on the scene Philibert, chevalier de Gramont, a French exile. He was already in his forties and a younger half-brother of Antoine III, duc de Gramont. He had got into trouble at the French court by courting Mademoiselle Anne-Lucie de la Mothe-Houdancourt, on whom Louis XIV had set his eyes. (Note: The girl courted by Louis XIV and Philibert de Gramont in 1662 was Anne-Lucie de La Motte-Houdancourt, who would marry René-François de La Vieuville in 1676. Walpole, when translating the Mémoires du comte de Gramont into English, confused her with Anne-Madeleine de Conty d'Argencourt, who had been a lesser mistress of Louis XIV four years earlier, in 1658. Cyril Hughes Hartmann repeats this error.)

De Gramont quickly entered the English court's inner circle. Not much adaptation was needed as French was the predominant language at the Restoration court. Elizabeth admired his wit and gallantry and fell in love with him.

== Marriage and children ==
Philibert married her in London late in 1663 or early in 1664. In March 1664, having heard of his marriage, Louis XIV wrote him a letter giving him permission to return. The couple had a son on 28 August old style, but he died as an infant.

A famous anecdote is told about her marriage, which reverts the order of events by placing the marriage, which was according to this tale forced on de Gramont by her brothers, after the permission to return. It goes as follows:

When in 1664 he was allowed to return to France, he left in haste, giving the impression that he would not honour his commitments. Her brothers George and Anthony, therefore, pursued and intercepted him on his way to Dover and pressured him to return and marry her. They asked him whether he had not forgotten something in London. He replied "Pardonnez-moi, messieurs, j'ai oublié d'épouser votre sœur." (Forgive me, Sirs, I have forgotten to marry your sister). He turned around, went back to London, and dutifully married her.

The story is partly proven wrong since he married her before Louis allowed him to come back, but it could well be true that a bit of pressure from her brothers was needed. It has been said that this incident suggested to Molière his comedy Le mariage forcé, first presented on 29 January 1664, but this idea clashes with the known dates.

Elizabeth and Philibert had two daughters:

1. Claude Charlotte (c. 1665 – 1739), married Henry Stafford-Howard, 1st Earl of Stafford.
2. Marie Élisabeth (1667–1729), became abbess in 1695 of the Chapter of Poussay in Lorraine.

Both were maids-of-honour to Maria Anna Victoria of Bavaria, after she became the Grande Dauphine by marrying Louis, Grand Dauphin in 1680. The marriage of the elder daughter was childless and the younger was a nun. Philibert's cadet branch of the house of Gramont, therefore, ended here.

== At the French court ==
She went with her husband to France and was appointed in 1667 dame du palais or lady-in-waiting to the French Queen, Maria Theresa of Spain. At that time the French court was seated at the Louvre in Paris, not yet at Versailles. At the court she was recognised as a woman of considerable wit and beauty. She also knew how to hold her own at the court of Louis XIV, being said to have "beak and claws". Her husband nevertheless pursued his gallant exploits to the close of a long life, being, said Ninon de l'Enclos, the only old man who could affect the follies of youth without being ridiculous.

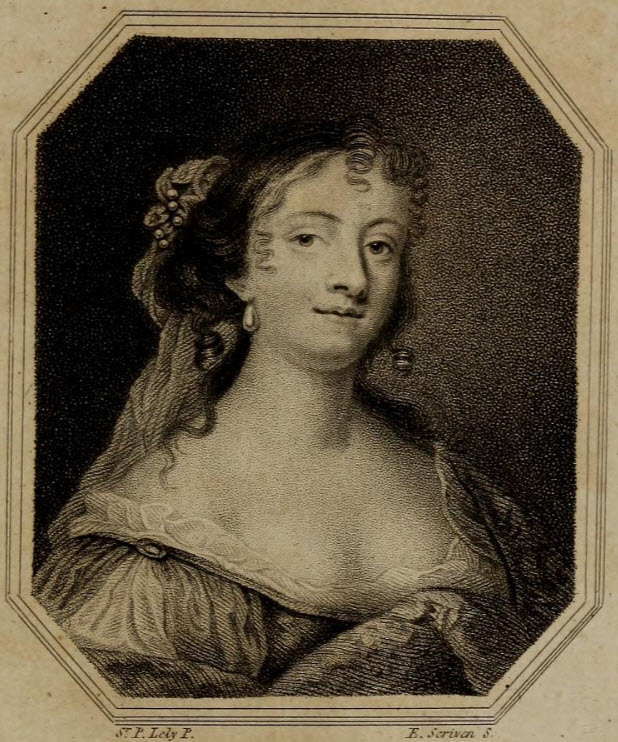
Engraving by Edward Scriven 1810, after Peter Lely.

In 1679, at the death of his elder brother Henri, who had appointed him his heir, her husband became comte de Toulongeon. He did not want to change his name to Toulongeon, but changed it from chevalier de Gramont to comte de Gramont. She was henceforth known as the comtesse de Gramont.

In 1679 she was pointed out as a client of La Voisin, and was thereby incriminated in the affaire des poisons. However, no action was taken against her. In May 1682 the French court moved its seat from the Louvre to the Palace of Versailles. In 1683 she lost her appointment as lady-in-waiting due to the queen's death. In 1684 Fénelon became a spiritual guide to her. In May 1690 the King assigned her an apartment in the Palace of Versailles that had been freed by the death of Charles de Sainte-Maure, duc de Montausier, the Dauphin's tutor.

On 6 April 1694 N.S. her daughter Claude Charlotte, aged 29, married Henry Stafford-Howard, 1st Earl of Stafford, aged 46, who had fled to France with James II. The marriage was held at Saint-Germain-en-Laye. She thus became Lady Stafford. He had been made Earl Stafford by James II on 5 October 1688 and had, at the same time, changed his name from Howard to Stafford-Howard. As the earldom was created before James II's flight, it was a valid English peerage and not a Jacobite one. The marriage would remain childless and was not happy.

In 1696, her husband fell gravely ill, and after he recovered, he followed her example and turned to devotion. In 1699, she fell into disgrace because of a visit she had paid to the abbey of Port-Royal-des-Champs. The king disliked the Jansenists. She had to beg his pardon.

In May 1703, when she was 61, Louis XIV lent her a house near the end of the Gardens of Versailles, called Les Moulineaux, (Note: Her house Les Moulineaux is today located on the Chemin de la Ferme des Moulineaux in the Commune of Bailly in the Yvelines department, not at Meudon as Corp says.) which she renamed Pontalie. This name is explained in the story "Le Bélier", written by her brother Anthony, who derives it from "pont d'Alie" (Alie's bridge), Alie being the daughter of a druid who marries a Prince of Noisy (after nearby Noisy-le-Roi) in the story.

== Death and timeline ==
Her husband died on 31 January 1707 in Paris. She died about a year later on 3 June 1708, also in Paris.

Timeline
Dates before she left for France in 1665 are in O.S. Thereafter they are in N.S. Italics for historical background.
Age	Date	Event
0	1641	Born, probably at Nenagh, County Tipperary, Ireland
4–5	17 Sep 1646	Ulster Army captured Roscrea
5–6	28 Jul 1647	Ormond abandoned Dublin to the Parliamentarians.
6–7	29 Sep 1648	Ormond returned to Ireland landing at Cork.
7–8	30 Jan 1649	King Charles I beheaded
7–8	2 Aug 1649	Battle of Rathmines. Michael Jones defeated Ormond before Dublin.
8–9	Oct 1650	Father defended Nenagh Castle against the Parliamentarians.
9–10	Early in 1651	Taken to France by her parents
9–10	7 Sep 1651	Majority of Louis XIV, end of his mother’s regency.]
10–11	About 1652	Started going to school at Port-Royal-des-Champs
18–19	1660 or 1661	Came to live at the court of Charles II of England at Whitehall
21–22	1663 or 1664	Married Philibert, chevalier de Gramont
22–23	28 Aug 1664	Birth of a son who died in his infancy
23–24	About 1665	Birth of first daughter Claude Charlotte
25–26	Feb 1667	Appointed lady-in-waiting to the French queen, Maria Theresa of Spain.
25–26	27 Dec 1667	Birth of second daughter, Marie Elisabeth
40–41	May 1682	The court moved its seat from the Louvre to Versailles.
48–49	May 1690	Louis XIV gave her an apartment in the Palace of Versailles.
52–53	3 Apr 1694	Daughter Claude Charlotte married Henry Stafford.
53–54	6 Jan 1695	Daughter Marie-Elisabeth became the abbess of the Chapter of Poussay.
57–58	1699	Fell temporarily in royal displeasure because she visited Port-Royal-des-Champs
61–62	May 1703	Louis XIV lent her a house near the end of the park of Versailles.
65–66	31 Jan 1707	Husband died in Paris.
66–67	3 Jun 1708	Died in Paris

== Notes and references ==
=== Sources ===
- Adams, William Henry Davenport (1865). "Elizabeth Hamilton, Countess of Grammont". Famous Beauties and Historic Women, a Gallery of Croquis Biographiques. Vol. I. London: Charles J. Skeet. pp. 67–84. OCLC 556759343.
- Airy, Osmund (1886). "Butler, James, twelfth Earl and first Duke of Ormonde (1610–1688)". In Lee, Sidney (ed.). Dictionary of National Biography. Vol. VIII. New York: MacMillan and Co. pp. 52–60. OCLC 8544105.
- Auger, L. S. (1805). "Notice sur la vie et les ouvrages d'Hamilton" [Note on Hamilton's Life and Work]. In Auger, Louis-Simon (ed.). Œuvres complètes d'Hamilton [Complete works of Hamilton] (in French). Vol. Tome premier. Paris: Colnet, Fain, Mongie, Debray & Delaunai. pp. 1–30. OCLC 848652758.
- Britland, Karen (2011). Mansel, Philip; Riotte, Torsten (eds.). Exile or Homecoming? Henrietta Maria in France 1644–1669. London: Palgrave Macmillan. pp. 120–140. ISBN 978-0-230-24905-9.
- Brunet, Gustave (1883). "Introduction". Mémoires du chevalier de Grammont (in French). Paris: G Charpentier. pp. i–xliv.
- Burke, Bernard; Burke, Ashworth Peter (1915). A Genealogical and Heraldic History of the Peerage and Baronetage, the Privy Council, Knightage and Companionage (77th ed.). London: Harrison. OCLC 1155471554.
- Cangioli, Paolo (1981). Versailles. Hersching: Manfred Pawlak. ISBN 978-0-948248-76-4.
- Carte, Thomas (1851) [1st pub. 1736]. The Life of James Duke of Ormond. Vol. III (New ed.). Oxford: Oxford University Press. OCLC 1086656347. – 1643 to 1660
- Clark, Ruth (1921). Anthony Hamilton: his Life and Works and his Family. London: John Lane. OCLC 459281163.
- Coffey, Diarmid (1914). O'Neill and Ormond – A Chapter of Irish History. Dublin: Maunsel & Company. OCLC 906164979.
- Cokayne, George Edward (1889). Complete Peerage of England, Scotland, Ireland, Great Britain and the United Kingdom, Extant, Extinct, or Dormant. Vol. II (1st ed.). London: George Bell and Sons. – Bra to C (for Butler)
- Cokayne, George Edward (1896). Complete Peerage of England, Scotland, Ireland, Great Britain and the United Kingdom, Extant, Extinct, or Dormant. Vol. VII (1st ed.). London: George Bell and Sons. OCLC 1180891114. – S to T (for Stafford)
- Cokayne, George Edward (1903). Complete Baronetage, 1611 to 1800. Vol. III (1st ed.). Exeter: William Pollard & Co. OCLC 866278985. – 1649 to 1664
- Cokayne, George Edward (1910). Gibbs, Vicary (ed.). The complete peerage of England, Scotland, Ireland, Great Britain and the United Kingdom, extant, extinct, or dormant. Vol. I (2nd ed.). London: St Catherine Press. OCLC 228661424. – Ab-Adam to Basing
- Corp, Edward (2004a). "Hamilton, Anthony [Antoine], Count Hamilton in the French nobility (1644/5?–1719)". In Matthew, Colin; Harrison, Brian (eds.). Oxford Dictionary of National Biography. Vol. 24. New York: Oxford University Press. pp. 766–768. ISBN 0-19-861374-1.
- Corp, Edward (2004b). "Hamilton, Elizabeth, Countess de Gramont". In Matthew, Colin; Harrison, Brian (eds.). Oxford Dictionary of National Biography. Vol. 24. New York: Oxford University Press. pp. 786–787. ISBN 0-19-861374-1.
- Corp, Edward (2004c). A Court in Exile: The Stuarts in France. Cambridge: Cambridge University Press. ISBN 0-521-58462-0.
- Coulanges, Madame de; L'Enclos, Ninon de (1823). Lettres de madame de Coulanges et de Ninon de l'Enclos (in French). Paris: Chaumerot Jeune. OCLC 38716810.
- Cunningham, Peter (1865). "The Early Painters of England: Peter Lely". The Art Journal. 27 (Vol. 4, New series): 7–8.
- Dangeau, Philippe de Courcillon, marquis de (1854a). Conches, Feuillet de (ed.). Journal du marquis de Dangeau (in French). Vol. Tome Premier. Paris: Firmin Didot Frères. OCLC 310446765. – 1684 to 1686
- Dangeau, Philippe de Courcillon, marquis de (1854b). Conches, Feuillet de (ed.). Journal du marquis de Dangeau (in French). Vol. Tome Troisième. Paris: Firmin Didot Frères. OCLC 310446765. – 1689 to 1691
- Dangeau, Philippe de Courcillon, marquis de (1857a). Conches, Feuillet de (ed.). Journal du marquis de Dangeau (in French). Vol. Tome Onzième. Paris: Firmin Didot Frères. OCLC 310446765. – 1706 to 1707
- Dangeau, Philippe de Courcillon, marquis de (1857b). Conches, Feuillet de (ed.). Journal du marquis de Dangeau (in French). Vol. Tome Douzième. Paris: Firmin Didot Frères. OCLC 310446765. – 1707 to 1709
- Debrett, John (1828). Peerage of the United Kingdom of Great Britain and Ireland. Vol. I (17th ed.). London: F. C. and J. Rivington. OCLC 54499602. – England
- Fryde, Edmund Boleslaw; Greenway, D. E.; Porter, S.; Roy, I., eds. (1986). Handbook of British Chronology. Royal Historical Society Guides and Handbooks, No. 2 (3rd ed.). London: Offices of the Royal Historical Society. ISBN 0-86193-106-8. – (for timeline)
- Gaspard, Émile (1871). Abbaye et Chapitre de Poussay (in French). Nancy: Crépin-Leblond. OCLC 494290851.
- Goubert, Pierre (1984). Initiation à l'histoire de la France [Initiation to the History of France] (in French). Paris: Fayard-Tallandier. ISBN 978-2-235-01484-7. – (for timeline)
- Gleeson, Dermot Florence (1947). Roscrea. A History of the Catholic Parish of Roscrea. Dublin: Sign of the Three Candles. OCLC 7062340. – Does not seem to be available online
- Hamilton, Anthony (1713). Mémoires de la vie du comte de Grammont (in French). Cologne: Pierre Marteau. OCLC 1135254578. – Princeps
- Hamilton, Anthony (1888). Memoirs of Count Grammont. Translated by Walpole, Horace. Philadelphia: Gebbie & Co. OCLC 1048777116.
- Hamilton, Anthony (1930). Memoirs of the Comte de Gramont. Translated by Quennell, Peter. New York: E. P. Dutton and Company. OCLC 1150292676.
- Hamilton, Antoine (1805). Auger, Louis-Simon (ed.). Œuvres complètes d'Hamilton [Hamilton's Complete Works] (in French). Vol. Tome second. Paris: Colnet, Fain, Mongie, Debray & Delaunai. OCLC 848652758. – Fleur d'Epine, Belier, Facardins, & Faustus
- Hartmann, Cyril Hughes (1924). La Belle Stuart. London: George Routledge & Sons. OCLC 1035924728.
- Hartmann, Cyril Hughes (1930). "The Chronology of the Memoirs of Comte de Gramont". Memoirs of the Comte de Gramont. London: E. P. Dutton and Company. pp. 370–378. OCLC 1150292676. – Appendix by Hartmann to Hamilton's Memoirs translated by Quennell
- Hayes-McCoy, Gerard Anthony (1990) [1st pub. 1969]. Irish Battles: A Military History of Ireland. Belfast: The Appletree Press. ISBN 0-86281-250-X.
- Jusserand, Jean Jules (1892). A French Ambassador at the Court of Charles the Second. London: T. Fisher Unwin. OCLC 1045606296.
- La Chesnaye des Bois, François Alexandre Aubert de (1866). Dictionnaire de la noblesse (in French). Vol. Tome neuvième (3rd ed.). Paris: Schlesinger Frères. OCLC 797014713. – GAR to GUE (for Gramont)
- Louis XIV (1806). Oeuvres de Louis XIV. Vol. V. Paris: Treuttel et Würtz. OCLC 1049962667.
- Manning, Conleth (2001). "The Two Sir George Hamiltons and their Connections with the Castles of Roscrea and Nenagh" (PDF). Tipperary Historical Journal: 149–154.
- Melville, Lewis (1928). "Chapter V - Elizabeth, Countess de Grammont". The Windsor Beauties. London: Hutchinson. OCLC 2991434.
- Merriam-Webster (1997). Merriam-Webster's Geographical Dictionary (Third ed.). Springfield, Massachusetts: Merriam-Webster. ISBN 0-87779-546-0. – (for place name pronunciation)
- Michel, Francisque Xavier (1862). Les Écossais en France (in French). Vol. Deuxième. Paris: Librairie A. Franck. OCLC 954640622.
- Millar, Alexander Hastie (1890). "Hamilton, James, first Earl of Abercorn (d.1617)". In Lee, Sidney (ed.). Dictionary of National Biography. Vol. XXIV. New York: MacMillan and Co. pp. 176–177. OCLC 8544105.
- Ó Ciardha, Éamonn (October 2009). McGuire, James; Quinn, James (eds.). "Hamilton, Elizabeth (La Belle Hamilton)". Dictionary of Irish Biography.
- Paul, Sir James Balfour (1904). The Scots Peerage, Founded on Wood's Edition of Sir Robert Douglas's Peerage of Scotland. Vol. I. Edinburgh: David Douglas. OCLC 505064285. – Abercorn to Balmerino
- Perceval-Maxwell, Michael (October 2009). McGuire, James; Quinn, James (eds.). "Butler, James". Dictionary of Irish Biography.
- Pope Alexander VII (15 February 1665). Bulle de N. S. P. le Pape Alexandre VII contre les cinq propositions extraites du livre de Jansenius (in French). OCLC 1041658562.
- Rigg, James McMullen (1890). "Hamilton, Elizabeth, Comtesse de Gramont (1641–1708)". In Lee, Sidney (ed.). Dictionary of National Biography. Vol. XXIV. New York: MacMillan and Co. pp. 146–147. OCLC 8544105.
- Sainte-Beuve, Charles-Augustin (1878). Port-Royal (in French). Vol. Tome deuxième (4th ed.). Paris: Hachette. OCLC 493070637.
- Saint-Simon (1895). Boislisle, A. de (ed.). Mémoires du duc de Saint-Simon [Memoirs of the Duke of Saint-Simon] (in French). Vol. Tome onzième (Nouvelle édition ed.). Paris: Hachette. OCLC 1068033585. – 1703
- Saint-Simon (1899). Boislisle, A. de (ed.). Mémoires du duc de Saint-Simon [Memoirs of the Duke of Saint-Simon] (in French). Vol. Tome quatorzième (Nouvelle ed.). Paris: Hachette. OCLC 1068033585. – 1706 to 1707
- Saint-Simon (1902). Boislisle, A. de (ed.). Mémoires du duc de Saint-Simon [Memoirs of the Duke of Saint-Simon] (in French). Vol. Tome seizième (Nouvelle édition ed.). Paris: Hachette. OCLC 1068033585. – 1708
- Sergeant, Philip Walsingham (1913). Little Jennings and Fighting Dick Talbot: A Life of the Duke and Duchess of Tyrconnel. Vol. I. London: Hutchinson. OCLC 474495830. – 1643 to 1685
- Ward, Adolphus William (1892). "James II (1633–1701)". In Lee, Sidney (ed.). Dictionary of National Biography. Vol. XXIX. New York: MacMillan and Co. pp. 181–199. OCLC 8544105.
- Warner, Ferdinand (1768). History of the Rebellion and Civil-War in Ireland. Vol. II. Dublin: James William. OCLC 82770539. – 1643 to 1660 and index
- Wheatley, Henry Benjamin (1907–1921). "Anthony Hamilton's Mémoires de la Vie du Comte de Gramont". In Ward, Adolphus William; Waller, Alfred Rayney (eds.). The Cambridge History of English and American Literature. Vol. 8. London: Cambridge University Press. ISBN 1-58734-073-9.
