= Strawberry Hill Press =

The Strawberry Hill Press was established on 25 June 1757 at Strawberry Hill, by the house's owner, Horace Walpole. He called it the Officina Arbuteana, and many of the first editions of his own works were printed there. The first works printed at Strawberry Hill, on 8 August 1757, were two odes of Thomas Gray, The Progress of Poesy and The Bard. Through Walpole's influence Robert Dodsley published in 1753 the designs of Richard Bentley for the poems of Gray. Among the reprints were the Life of Lord Edward Herbert, 1st Baron Herbert of Cherbury, Antoine Hamilton's Mémoires of Philibert de Gramont, Hentzner's Journey into England, and Lord Whitworth's Account of Russia.

== Notes and references ==
=== Sources ===
- Auger, Louis Simon (1805). Auger, Louis-Simon (ed.). Notice sur la vie et les ouvrages d'Hamilton [Note on Hamilton's life and works] (in French). Vol. Tome premier. Paris: Colnet, Fain, Mongie, Debray & Delaunai. pp. 1–30. OCLC 848652758.
- Chisholm, Hugh, ed. (1911). "Walpole, Horatio" . Encyclopædia Britannica. Vol. 28 (11th ed.). Cambridge University Press. p. 289.
