= Peter Hammer (disambiguation) =

Peter Hammer may refer to:

- Peter L. Hammer (1936–2006), mathematician
- Peter Hammer, fictional character in Senior Project (film)
- Peter Hammer Verlag, German publisher in Wuppertal

== See also ==
- Pierre Marteau, a fictional German publishing house whose name means Peter Hammer
