= Governor of Limerick =

Historic military role at Limerick, Ireland

The Governor of Limerick was a military officer who commanded the garrison at Limerick in Ireland.

== List of governors ==
- William de Burgh
- –1622: Sir Maurice Berkeley
- 1622–1642: George Courtenay, 1st Baronet, of Newcastle
- 1650–51: Hugh Dubh O'Neill (during Ireton's siege of the town)
- 1651–1653: Sir Hardress Waller
- 1653–1659: Sir Henry Ingoldsby, 1st Baronet
- c. 1670–1685: Sir William King
- 1685: Antoine Hamilton
- 1690: Alexandre de Rainier de Droue, Marquis de Boisseleau (Jacobite)
- c. 1693: John Simpson
- c. 1726: Thomas Pierse
- Thomas Butler, 2nd son of Brinsley Butler, 1st Viscount Lanesborough
- 1751–1760: Sir John Cope
- 1761: John Campbell, 4th Duke of Argyll
- 1770: John Hale
- 1775: Sir Henry Clinton
- 10 July 1794: Gerard Lake
- 1797–1804: Eyre Massey, 1st Baron Clarina
- 23 May 1804: William Fawcett
- 4 October 1826: William Knollys
- 20 March 1834: The post was abolished on the death of Knollys.

== Sources ==
- Beatson, Robert (1806). A Political Index to the Histories of Great Britain and Ireland. Vol. III (3rd ed.). London: Longman, Hurst, Rees, and Orme. OCLC 2228463. – Scotland & Ireland
- Burke, Bernard; Burke, Ashworth Peter (1915). A Genealogical and Heraldic History of the Peerage and Baronetage, the Privy Council, Knightage and Companionage (77th ed.). London: Harrison. OCLC 1155471554.
- Clark, Ruth (1921). Anthony Hamilton: his Life and Works and his Family. London: John Lane. OCLC 459281163.
- Gibney, John (October 2009). McGuire, James; Quinn, James (eds.). "King, Sir William". Dictionary of Irish Biography.
- Little, Patrick (2004). "Waller, Sir Hardress (c.1604–1666)". In Matthew, Colin; Harrison, Brian (eds.). Oxford Dictionary of National Biography. Vol. 56. New York: Oxford University Press. pp. 977–979. ISBN 0-19-861406-3.
- "No. 13703". The London Gazette. 13–16 September 1794. p. 932.
- "No. 15708". The London Gazette. 5–9 June 1804. p. 700.
- "No. 18295". The London Gazette. 10 October 1826. p. 2410.
- McGrath, Brid (1997). "Hardress Waller (?1604–1666) Limerick County". A Biographical Dictionary of the Membership of the Irish House of Commons 1640 to 1641 (PhD). Vol. 1. Dublin: Trinity College. pp. 292–295. hdl:2262/77206. – Parliaments & Biographies (PDF downloadable from given URL)
- Wiggins, Kenneth (2001). Anatomy of a Siege: King John's Castle, Limerick, 1642. London: The Boydell Press. ISBN 0-85115-827-7. – (Preview)
