= Nicolas de Malézieu =

French intellectual, Greek scholar and mathematician

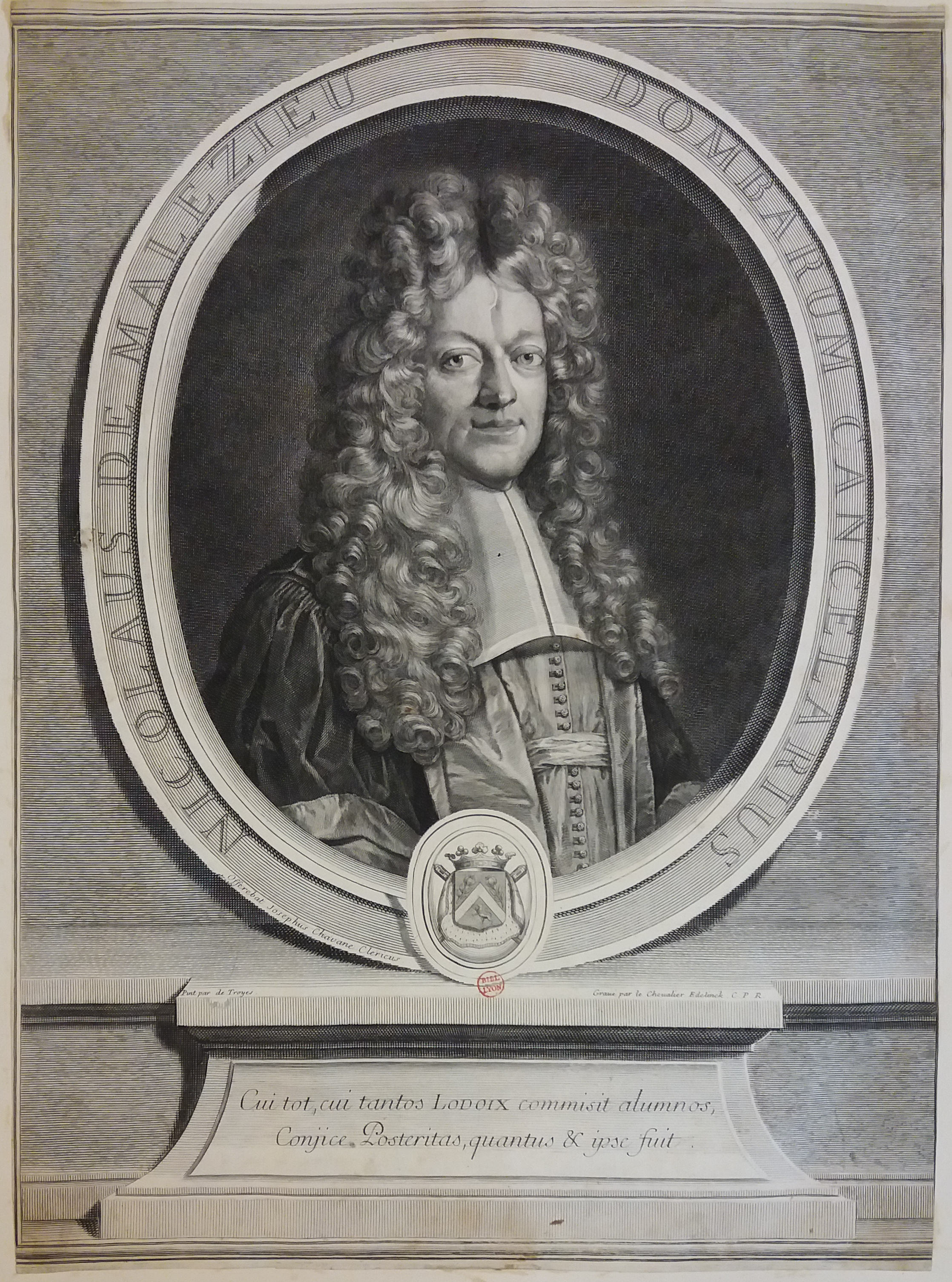
Nicolas de Malezieu

Nicolas de Malézieu (or Malézieux) (or Malesieu) (7 September 1650, in Paris – 4 March 1727, in Paris) was a French intellectual, Greek scholar and mathematician.

== Life and career ==
Nicolas de Malézieu was a squire and lord of Chatenay. He later became chancellor of Dombes and secretary-general to the Swiss and Grisons of France. He was the tutor of Louis Auguste, Duke of Maine (to whom he introduced Bossuet) and he declaimed the plays of Euripides and Sophocles to the duchess who had made her chateau of Sceaux into a literary salon. Here he became a member of the light-hearted fraternity she founded, the (fr) Knights of the Bee, and organised the festivals she loved, the fr:Grandes Nuits de Sceaux. Later tutor to duc de Bourgogne, he was appointed to the Académie royale des sciences in 1699 and to the Académie française in 1701.

Malézieu collected and published the lessons in mathematics that he gave to the duc de Bourgogne over four years in 1705 as Élémens de géométrie de Mgr le duc de Bourgogne. Le Journal des savants reported in detail the observations he made in this work on geometry and infinitely small numbers. In 1713, this work was translated into Latin as Serenissimi Burgundiae Ducis Elementa Geometrica, ex Gallico Semone in Latinum translata ad Usum Seminarii Patavini. A third (posthumous) edition, with corrections and a supplemental treatise on logarithms, appeared 1729.

Nicolas de Malézieu also translated Euripides’ Iphigenia in Tauris as well as poems, songs and sketches, which were published in 1712 in Les Divertissements de Sceaux and in 1725 in the Suite des Divertissements. Among these pieces are Philémon et Baucis, Le Prince de Cathay, Les Importuns de Chatenay, La Grande Nuit de l'éclipse, L'Hôte de Lemnos, La Tarentole and L'Heautontimorumenos. Often written in a single day, these pieces were set to music and staged for the amusement of the duchess, to whom Malézieu also gave courses in astronomy.

A four-volume work, a Histoire des fermes du roi (History of Royal Farms) survives only a manuscript version dating from 1746.

Pierre-Édouard Lémontey said of Malézieu "Knowing a bit about everything, he gathered in his servile person all the advantages of universal mediocrity."

== Family ==
Malézieu was the son of Nicolas de Malézieu (1612-1652) and Marie des Forges (d.1680). His brother Michel Louis de Malézieu married Marie Jérônime Mac Carthy (d.1714)

In 1672 Malézieu married Françoise Faudel de Fauveresse (1650-1741) by whom he had the following children:

- Nicolas de Malézieu (1674-1748), bishop of Lavaur en 1713.
- Pierre de Malézieu (1680-1756), married Louise Marthe Stoppa in 1717 (d.1720), under-secretary to the duc de Maine, secretary-general of the Swiss and Grisons in 1727, brigadier of the infantry, ifnanterie, maréchal de camp in 1734, lieutenant general of the artillery and commander of the Order of Saint-Louis in 1756.
- Charles-François de Malézieu (d.1763), lieutenant-colonel of a brigade of carabiniers, cavalry brigadier in 1745, governor of the harbour and defences of La Rochelle.
- Élisabeth de Malézieu (b.1676), married (1699) Antoine des Rioux de Missimy, first president of the parlement and intendant of Dombes
- Marie de Malézieu (b.1682), married (1705) Louis de Guiry, seigneur de Noncourt and la Roncière, mestre de camp of the cavalry, lieutenant general of Aunis and la Rochelle
