= Anne-Madeleine de Conty d'Argencourt =

Mistress of Louis XIV in 1658

La Motte-Argencourt
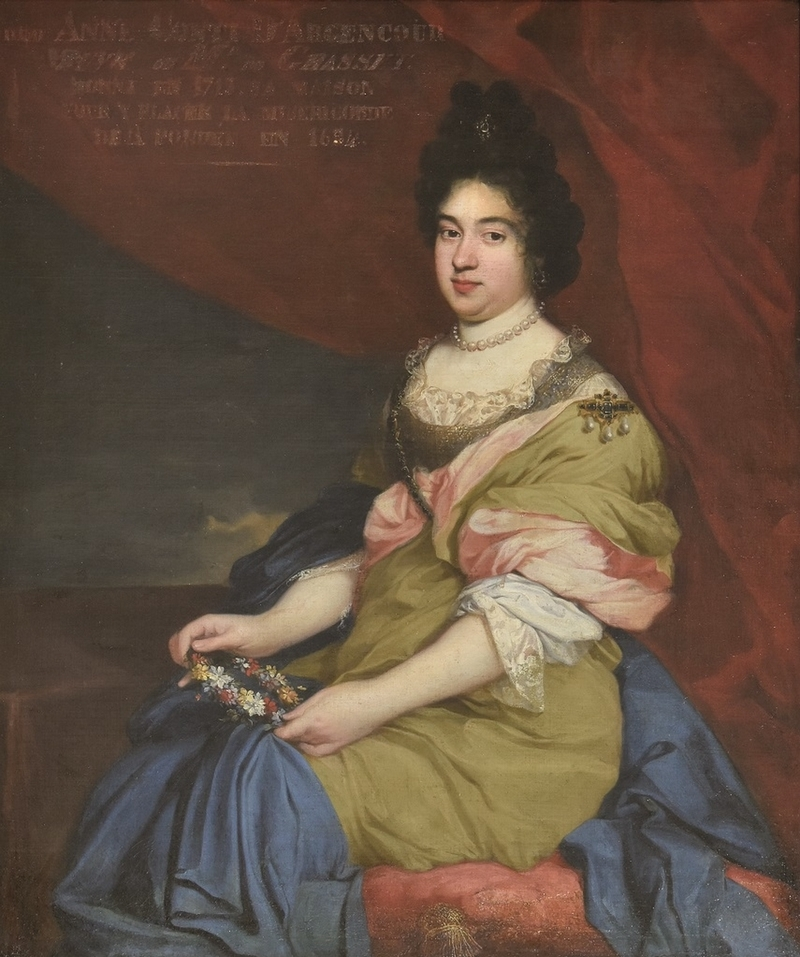
- Anne-Madeleine de Conty d'Argencourt
- Born: 1637; Montpellier
- Died: 1718 (aged 80–81)
- Father: Pierre de Conty d'Argencourt
- Mother: Madeleine de Chaumont de Bertichères

Anne-Madeleine de Conty d'Argencourt (1637–1718), was a maid of honour to Anne of Austria in 1657. She is known for her love affair with Louis XIV in 1658. She fled France in 1679 together with Olympia Mancini after having been implicated in the Affair of the Poisons.

== Life ==
Anne-Madeleine was born in 1637 in Montpellier, a daughter of Pierre de Conty d'Argencourt (1587–1655) and his wife Madeleine de Chaumont de Bertichères (died about 1638). Anne-Madeleine was baptised four years later on 20 September 1641 in Montpellier. Her father was a military engineer.

=== Maid of honour and king's mistress ===
Known at the court as Mademoiselle de la Motte-Argencourt, she was a maid of honour to the queen mother, Anne of Austria (1601–1666), replacing mademoiselle de la Porte in 1657.

In 1658 she was for a while a mistress of Louis XIV. According to Bussy-Rabutin in his Histoire amoureuse des Gaules, she participated in an intrigue with the young Louis XIV. The Grand Mademoiselle wrote in her Memoirs that the king's passion for La Motte-Argencourt went back to 1658, the year when the girl's mother received the court in her house in Montpellier.

Afterwards she became the mistress of Jean-Baptiste Amador de Vignerot du Plessis, marquess of Richelieu (1632–1662), which annoyed the king, whereupon she chose to retire to the convent of the Filles de Sainte Marie de Chaillot. She never became a nun, however, and was later able to leave the convent and marry.

=== Marriage ===
On 4 August 1671 La Motte-Argencourt married Gabriel de Grasset, seigneur de Farlet, councillor at the court of auditeurs, aides et finances of Montpellier.

=== Affair of the Poisons ===
In 1679 she fled to Flanders with Olympia Mancini, Countess of Soissons, her intimate friend, when they got both implicated in the Affair of the Poisons.

=== Death ===
She died in 1718. In her will she bequeathed her house in Montpellier to the Dames de la Miséricorde to help them care for the sick.

== Mistaken identity ==
Due to the similarity of their names, La Motte-Argencourt has sometimes been confused with Anne-Lucie de la Mothe-Houdancourt, who was a minor mistress of Louis in 1662. This confusion seems to have first been made by editors of the Mémoires de Mademoiselle de Montpensier, written by Anne Marie Louise d'Orléans, Duchess of Montpensier. From there it spread to the Mémoires du comte de Grammont, which is concerned with La Mothe-Houdancourt. The Gebbie edition and the McKay edition of the Grammont Memoirs give "Agencourt" where "Houdancourt" should be read. Both these editions carry the note "Translated with notes by Walpole". Hartmann (1924) repeats this error but corrects it in 1930.
