= Gerard Anthony Hayes-McCoy =

Gerard A. Hayes-McCoy (1911–1975) was an Irish historian regarded as one of the leading Irish historians of his generation.

== Life ==
=== Family ===
Gerard Anthony Hayes-McCoy was born in Galway on 15 August 1911, of Thomas Hayes-McCoy and Mary Kathleen Hayes-McCoy (née Wallace). His grandfather Thomas Hayes-McCoy had been a Dubliner who as a child came to Galway in 1834; he was later a well-known Parnellite. His maternal grandfather, Thomas Burke, had been a Galway artist. Hayes-McCoy grew up on Eyre Square where his father ran a gentleman's hairdressing business. His two older siblings were Ignatius and Marguerite; the latter also received a PhD-degree in History at University College Galway, and later taught at the Galway Technical School.

=== Education ===
Hayes-McCoy received his early education from the Patrician Brothers, Galway. His earliest notebook of 1927 and a manuscript history of Poland of the same year, now at the National Library of Ireland, testify to an early interest in history and heritage. From 1928 to 1932 he was a student scholarship holder at University College Galway, graduating in 1932 with a Bachelor of Commerce, and a Bachelor of Arts, with first-class honours in both, and a specialisation in "History, Ethics, Politics" for the latter. Mary Donovan O'Sullivan was one of his professors of history, and Liam Ó Briain, professor of Romance languages, was a stimulating influence. At this time Hayes-McCoy was a member of the Republican Club, a committee member of the Literary and Debating Society, and in 1931 he was one of the founding members of a new Irish Students' Association.

Hayes-McCoy pursued his PhD at the University of Edinburgh (conferred July 1934), and then spent two years at the Institute of Historical Research, London, in the Tudor seminar of J.E.Neale, rewriting his PhD and eventually publishing it as Scots mercenary forces in Ireland, 1565–1603 (Dublin and London, 1937), with a foreword by Eoin MacNeill. This was characterised by meticulous archival research, and it anticipated by sixty years the much vaunted New British History of the late twentieth century by tracing the interconnections between events in England, Ireland, and Scotland.

=== Career ===
In the absence of an academic post, Hayes-McCoy became an assistant keeper in the Art and Industrial Division at the National Museum of Ireland (1939–1959), with a responsibility for the Military History, and the War of Independence collections. One of his first tasks was to prepare a standing exhibition on Irish history before 1916. His research, long-standing personal interest in the military, and his curatorial experience, helped form an expert knowledge of historical Irish warfare. This led to his role in co-founding The Military History Society of Ireland in 1949 whose journal The Irish Sword he edited (1949–1959). Hayes-McCoy described the vagaries of setting up such a body, its reception, and the historiographical considerations attendant on it, in a paper published posthumously in The Irish Sword.

On 19 August 1941 Hayes-McCoy had married Mary Margaret "May" O'Connor (daughter of C.J. and M.B. O'Connor, New Ross/Enniscorthy). They had three daughters and two sons (Mary, Ann, Ian, Robert, Felicity). The family home was in Dublin.

Earning high reputation by continued research and by publishing led to Hayes-McCoy's receipt of the D.Litt. degree from the National University, and to his membership in the Royal Irish Academy (1950). In his professional career, he published prolifically (this is apart from the broad spectrum of press publications) – a comprehensive list was made by Harman Murtagh. The works that were judged most influential, were his Scots mercenary forces in Ireland 1565–1603 (1937) ("a pioneer study in Scots-Irish relations"), the papers "The early history of guns in Ireland" (1938–1939), "Strategy and tactics in Irish warfare, 1593–1601" (1941), "The army of Ulster, 1593–1601" (1951), the controversial "Gaelic society in Ireland in the late sixteenth century" (1963), and the monographs Irish battles (London 1969), and A history of Irish flags from earliest times (Dublin 1979). A member of the Irish Manuscripts Commission, his most notable contribution was the publication Ulster and other Irish maps, c.1600 (Dublin 1964).

In 1946, he was appointed to a committee of eight historians to advise on setting up the Bureau of Military History – a body established for the creation and compilation of material on the history of the Irish movements for independence, 1913–1921, specifically from witness statements. The committee was also to further offer guidance and oversee progress of the Bureau in co ordination with the Ministry of Defence: it subsequently expressed concerns about the state's role and methods in the collection of statements.

Having begun writing for the press at an early stage, G.A.Hayes-McCoy's public position at the Museum encouraged him to go further. He had broad involvement with local history groups to whom he presented papers, and also worked for newspapers and for radio and television. To the national and Galway press he usually contributed articles on military aspects of Irish history, as well as book reviews, but he also used them as a platform to engage with what he saw were flaws in the education of history in Ireland which during his lifetime was constrained by a certain degree of political and cultural state control.

During the 1940s and 1950s, Hayes-McCoy became involved in a number of paratheatrical events of national significance one of which – the "Pageant of St.Patrick" for which he wrote the script (An Tóstal 1954) – was realised on an immense scale. He scripted these works to begin with(1947, 1953, 1954), and was later principally engaged as historical consultant (1947, 1955, 1956, [1957]). In that capacity, he collaborated in 1955 and 1956 with Micheál Mac Liammóir and Denis Johnston on their scripts for pageants on St.Patrick and on the Táin Bó Cuailgne, at times finding it difficult to square the historical liberties taken by these artists with his own role.

On Irish radio and television Hayes-McCoy was most active in the mid-1960s; editing and contributing to Thomas Davis lectures series, writing scripts for a series of thirty children's programmes on all aspects of Irish history, and preparing/contributing on air to the television series "Irish battles" and "The long winter". As well as writing for RTÉ, Ireland's national broadcaster, he contributed scripts to BBC Northern Ireland's schools radio programmes.

In 1959 Hayes-McCoy succeeded to the chair of his former history professor at UCG with the full remit of lecturing (in English), administering examinations to undergraduates, and supervising postgraduate theses – among those of his students who continued in the field of history were Nicholas Canny, Martin Coen, Patrick Melvin, Peter Toner, Tony Claffey, and Breandán Ó Bric. After his appointment to UCG, the family home remained in Dublin and Hayes-McCoy commuted to Galway weekly during term time.

In the early 1960s Hayes-McCoy became a spokesperson for the movement rekindled by the Old Galway Society to preserve the landmark "Lion's Tower" in that city. The ultimate failure of the campaign informed Hayes-McCoy's regret, expressed a year later, that Ireland was forgetful about its past and that "we don't bother to find out about it or to maintain our ancient heritage", and, on a perceived spirit of conformity: "take my own city of Galway, it is now more prosperous than it was, but it is no longer distinctive. I do not believe that it is essential for progress that we should lose our heritage"

While at one time member and secretary of the London Sinn Féin office (Roger Casement Cumann, 1935), and informed by a pride of country and place, Hayes-McCoy's professional and private outlook were marked by a distrust of nationalism or of any antagonising national agendas compromising genuine scholarship. In a paper drafted on tendencies in modern historical studies, he criticised the two historiographical extremes, each to be avoided, each unfortunately characteristic of the moment – extreme de-bunking and extreme 'adding for effect'. 'A history is a record of fact; to add pseudo-facts is as grave a sin as to leave out real facts that may change the colour of the whole'.

Hayes-McCoy's abiding pastime was drawing. Among his papers in the James Hardiman Library, NUI Galway are c. 40 items with predominantly maritime subjects, and he had a special regard for the history of ships, and a romantic liking of the sea. He also had a lifelong interest in Robert Louis Stevenson, Sir Walter Scott, and their works, and in the Pre-Raphaelite movement.

G.A.Hayes-McCoy's middle age was marked by intermittent ill health. He died on 27 November 1975 in his room at the Great Southern Hotel, Eyre Square, Galway.

Hayes-McCoy's papers are held at the James Hardiman Library, National University of Ireland, Galway. This text has been abstracted, with permission, from the biographical information provided on him by the library.

== Publications (selected) ==
- 1937: Scots Mercenary Forces in Ireland, 1565–1603, reprinted 1996
- 1942: Index to "The Compossicion Booke of Conought 1585"
- 1959: Sixteenth Century Irish Swords in the National Museum of Ireland
- 1963: Historical Studies IV: papers read before the Fifth Irish Conference of Historians (editor)
- 1964: The Irish at War
- 1964: Ulster and Other Irish Maps, c. 1600.
- 1965: Captain Myles Walter Keogh, United States Army 1840–1876 (O'Donnell lecture)
- 1969: Irish Battles: a military history of Ireland, reprinted 1990
- 1979: A History of Irish Flags from Earliest Times (posthumous)
- unknown
  - The Red Coat and the Green
  - Essays in Commemoration – 1798 (contributor)
