= Pierre Marteau =

Imprint of French publishing house

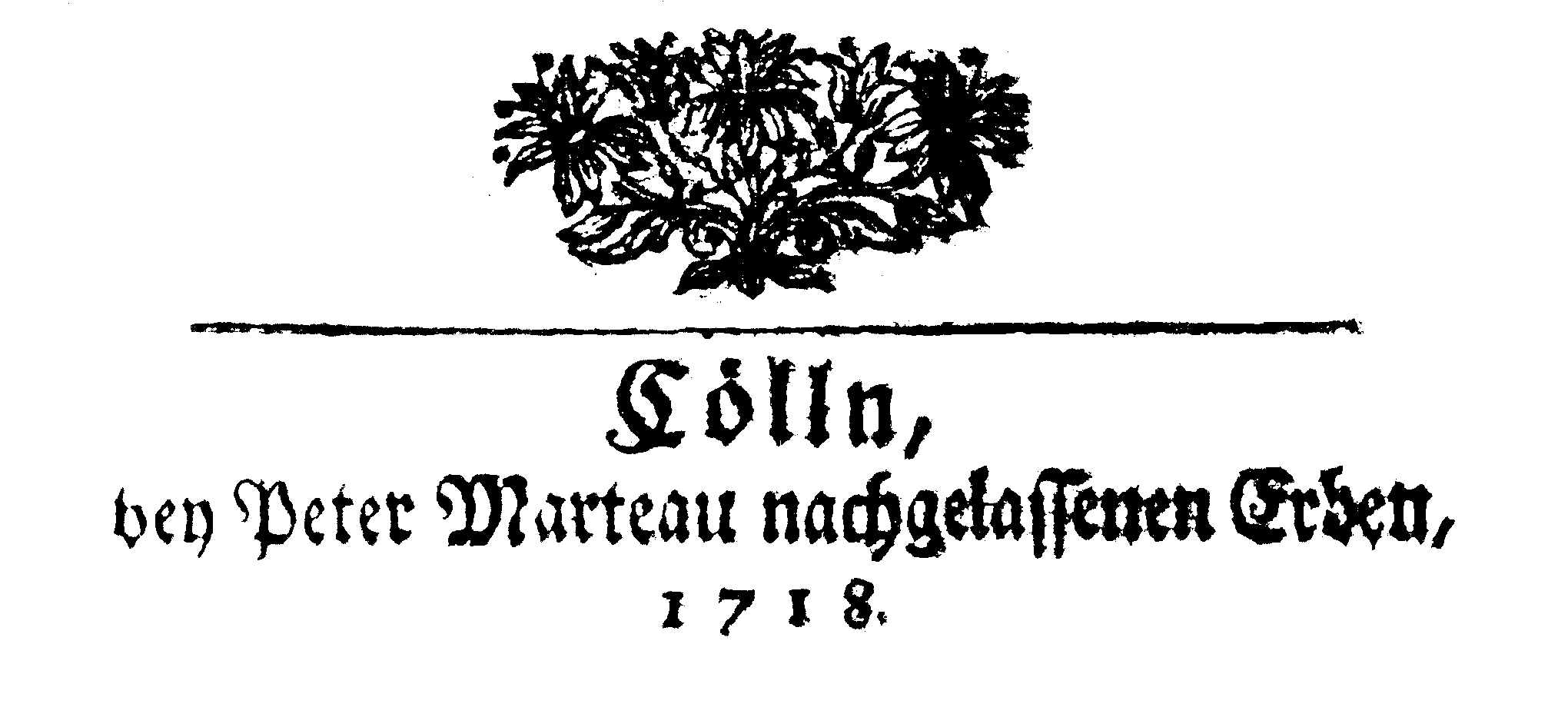
"Cologne, [Sold] by Pierre Marteau's remaining Heirs", A German Marteau imprint of 1718.

Pierre Marteau (French for Peter Hammer) was the imprint of a supposed publishing house. Allegedly located in Cologne from the 17th century onward, contemporaries were well-aware that such a publishing house never actually existed. Instead, the imprint was a fiction under which publishers and printers — in the Netherlands, France and Germany — evaded the open identification with books they published.

== History ==
=== Open pseudonym and political joke, spreading in the 1660s ===
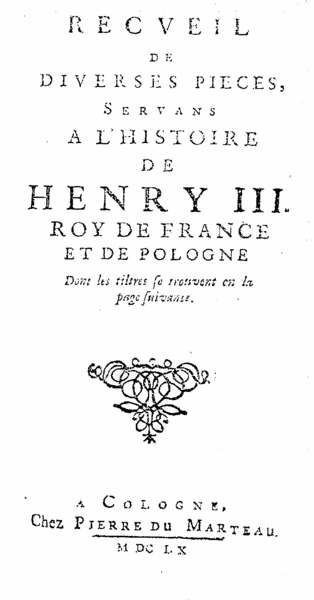
Probably the first Marteau-title: L'Histoire de Henry III (1660).

The first French-language Marteau books appeared in the 1660s and were immediately identified as not actually being published by a man named Pierre Marteau residing in Cologne. The name would have been that of a Frenchman who had opened his shop outside France yet close to the French border. Cologne's geographical location smelled of political freedom — Marteau would avoid France's censorship by publishing outside France; Cologne promised access to the European market and the chance to get a good deal of the production smuggled back into France where it would sell on the black market for ten times the price.

French publishers, political dissidents and Huguenots who had suffered political persecution under Louis XIV had opened their shops in Amsterdam and they would soon open new shops at The Hague, Rotterdam and Geneva. The Dutch Republic (a.k.a. the United Provinces) and Switzerland protected Europe's Protestants of the reformed churches, the minority among the three European confessions. These were the privileged countries French refugees tended to go.

Germany, a political entity of hundreds of little territories, half of them "Orthodox" Lutheran Protestant half of them Catholic, which all together hardly ever united under the rule of the Roman Catholic Emperor, was only a third option. Some of the more liberal places like Hamburg (Altona harboured sectarians and clandestine bookshops) and the university cities Halle, Leipzig and Jena offered freedoms to critical intellectuals, yet only a few states like Brandenburg-Prussia openly sympathised with the reformed branch of Protestantism to which France's Huguenots belonged. Germany was a choice with disadvantages. Cologne, however, was of all the options Germany granted the worst, which was to become apparent at the beginning of the 18th century when most of Germany's territories joined the Dutch Republic and Great Britain against France in the Great Alliance of the War of the Spanish Succession. The two Wittelsbach-ruled countries — Cologne and Bavaria — were the only important western European territories that supported Louis XIV.

The first Marteau books were French and most certainly printed in Amsterdam by publishers who would not risk to tell their names even in the Netherlands. Research has hinted at Amsterdam publisher Elzevier as the man who invented the imprint. It was, at first, just one among many openly misleading imprints. Unlike the usual obvious pseudonyms like "Jacques le Sincere", the name "Pierre Marteau" sounded real. The detail which gave away his virtuality remained on the reader's side — he would identify Cologne as the likely and yet unlikely place to go. "Hammer" made the joke a little bit more explicit: this man had courage and he was as real and as bold as a hammer.

Unlike other pseudonyms which appeared on only one title page, Marteau was to have a career that could be made only by a good joke and a complete lack of intellectual property rights. Numerous publishers began to sell books under the label. Remarkably, the uncoordinated joint venture was nonetheless able to produce a distinct publisher's identity. Only certain books attracted the imprint: French yet anti-French political satire, pirated editions, sexually explicit titles.

=== German Marteau books and the European decades between 1689 and 1721 ===
Historical Profile of the German Marteau production, books per year

A second branch of Marteau books developed in the late 1680s when German-language titles first assumed the curious imprint. 1689 became a landmark year, the year of the Glorious Revolution which had brought a Dutch regent onto the English throne. William of Orange, who had led the Dutch resistance against France in the 1670s, became William III of England, Scotland and Wales. Whilst France protected the deposed Stuart Pretender, William was particularly keen to move both the Netherlands and his newly acquired Britain into an anti-French alliance on Germany's behalf — Louis XIV had just attacked the Palatinate; the Nine Years' War began —, the first phase of the Great Alliance, a period German intellectuals would soon praise as the beginning of a thoroughly European age. German intellectuals had always admired France's intellectuals and the latest Parisian fashions, yet they had also felt uneasy about their love of France. Germany's critical voices complained, as they considered their own leanings towards France, that Germany had not produced any authentic German culture.

In the 1680s things changed. All of a sudden, one could be a German patriot and openly embrace French culture — if only one stressed the fact that France's intellectuals were by now mostly critical of their own country's political repression and ambition. French dissidents published political journals, newspapers and books outside France on the international market. Germans bought and imitated them after the events of 1689 without the slightest feeling of national disloyalty. The new French authors propagated the very Europe which had come to Germany's assistance. The Great Alliance against France was produced and supported by the French press of the Netherlands. Marteau was the publisher of the Great Alliance and the new modern Europe fighting France, the hegemonic power striving for a "universal monarchy" over all its neighbours. The Marteau label became fashionable, and German publishers adopted it: it flourished, with translations of French Marteau books and with original German titles now appearing under the labels of Marteau, his Widow, his Son, and a growing line of virtual family members continuing the business.

The peaks of the German Marteau production coincide with the political events Marteau covered. The beginning of the Great Alliance in 1689, its renewal on the eve of the War of the Spanish Succession in 1701, its end in a Tory victory in London 1709/10 and the succeeding peace negotiations at Utrecht, kept Marteau's political authors busy.

Europe turned out to be unreliable. English Tory politicians crafted the Treaty of Utrecht, which favored France's aspirations even though France had nearly lost the recent war. German intellectuals were unhappy with Europe, yet they still had to trust in Europe and to promote the European idea if Hanover's King George was to continue his aspirations to the English throne. He crossed the Channel in 1714 and had to survive a phase of political turmoil in 1715 and 1716 — covered by Marteau with all the old anti-French political bias: France promoted the Stuart Pretender in his fight against the newly established German King. The Great Alliance gave way to the Quadruple Alliance of 1718–1720 in which Austria, France, Great Britain, and the United Provinces joined their forces to resolve the next European conflict. The fate of Europe remained on the political agenda until 1721, with the other half of Europe fighting the Great Northern War. The conflict about Sweden's and Russia's future power had begun in 1700 and involved northern and eastern Europe from Stockholm to Constantinople. It ended in 1721 and brought the European period of 1689–1721 to a silent end.

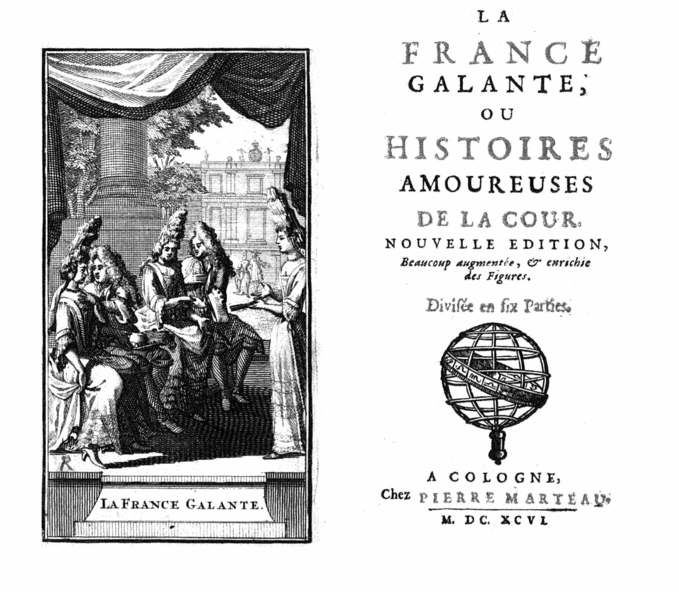
Entertainment and politics: La France Galante (1696).

Political books dominated Marteau's production. The peculiar Memoires pour rendre la paix perpetuelle en Europe appeared at one of Marteau's rivals in Cologne: Jacques le Pacifique published their first volume in 1712 (Immanuel Kant would refer to the outline of a union of European states at the end of the century in his famous treatise on a permanent world peace). Politics could hardly be separated from entertainment. Anne-Marguerite Petit du Noyer published her political gossip under the ubiquitous label. The secrets of the diplomats negotiating at Utrecht were a bestseller. Political novels like La Guerre d'Espagne (Cologne: Pierre Marteau, 1707) were extremely influential — the book mixed fact and fiction, sections of newspaper history with personal adventures of its hero, a virtual James Bond in the services of Louis XIV.

Satirical novels written by students in Halle, Leipzig and Jena claimed to be printed in Cologne. A pirated edition of the first German translation of The Book of One Thousand and One Nights appeared under the imprint. The mixing of fact and fiction, information and entertainment, intellectual theft and scandal — the only possible answer to the censorship laws flourishing all over Europe — marked the Marteau production between 1660 and 1721.

=== European publisher and German national icon ===
A third phase of the Marteau production began after the European decades of 1689–1721 with the nationalistic turn of the 1720s and 1730s. Marteau's German production became pro-German and potentially anti-French, finding its peaks in the years of the French Revolution and the Napoleonic Wars.

The 20th and 21st centuries saw only very few new Marteau publications, with the leftist Peter Hammer Verlag in Wuppertal. The old publishing house's modern web-presence at pierre-marteau.com remains a virtual enterprise led by historians of the 18th century who use the label as a well established brand name to publish texts of the period 1650-1750 and research dealing with that period.

== Literature ==
- Janmart de Brouillant; Léonce. "Histoire de Pierre du Marteau imprimeur à Cologne (17-18. siècles), suivie d'une notice d'un livre intitulé: : "Histoire des amours du Grand Alcandre en laquelle sous des noms empruntez, se lisent les advantures amoureuses d'un grand Prince der derni". Europeana. (Genève: Slatkine Reprints, 1971).
- Karl Klaus Walther: Die deutschsprachige Verlagsproduktion von Pierre Marteau/ Peter Hammer, Köln (Leipzig, 1983), Marteau e-text.
- Olaf Simons: Marteaus Europa oder Der Roman, bevor er Literatur wurde (Amsterdam/ Atlanta: Rodopi, 2001) ISBN 90-420-1226-9, images from there with permission of the Author).
