= Louis-Simon Auger =

French writer and literary critic (1772–1829)

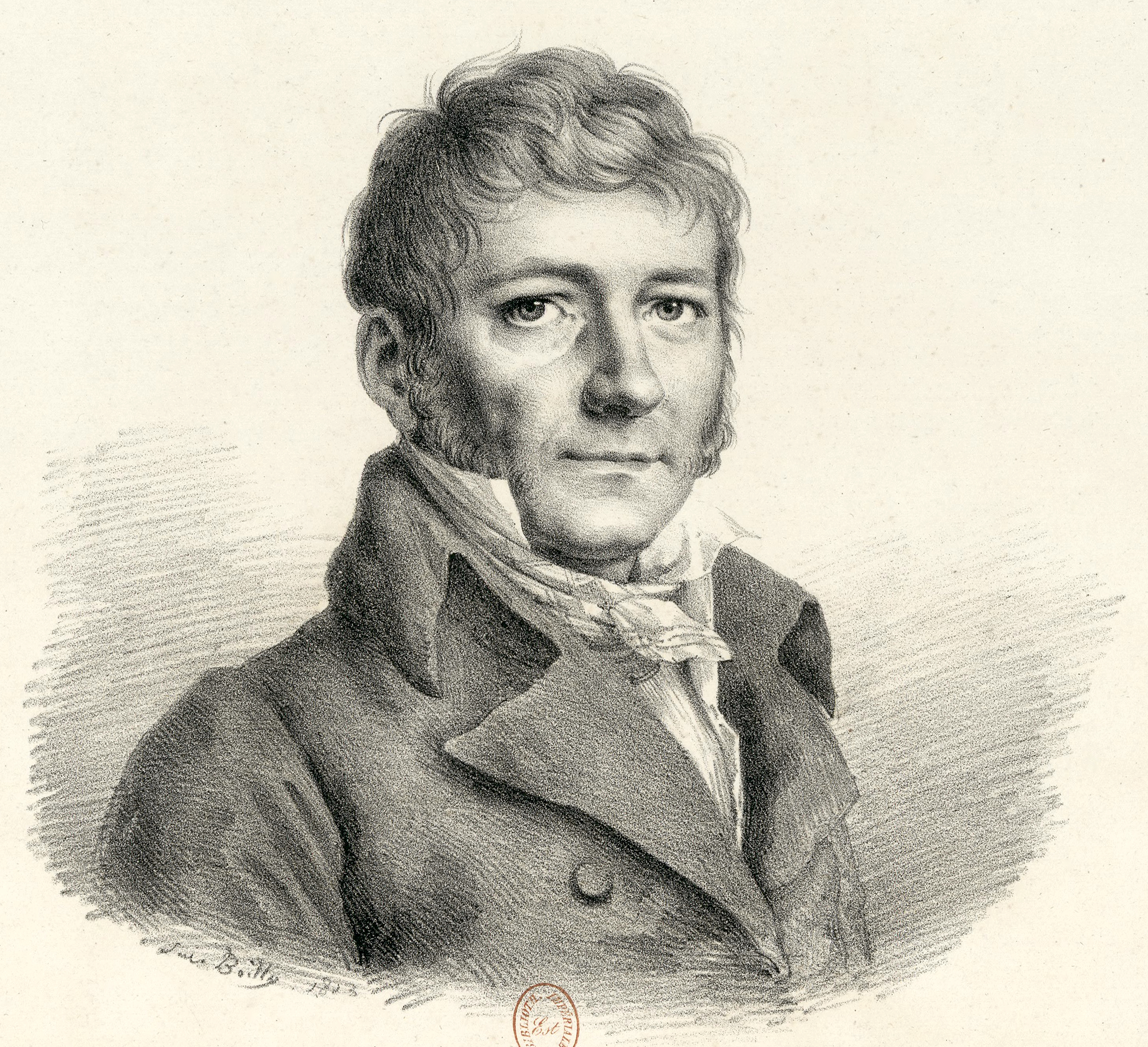

Louis-Simon Auger (29 December 1772, in Paris – 2 January 1829, in Paris) was a French journalist, literary critic and playwright.
