= Discalced =

Religious order whose members go barefoot or wear sandals

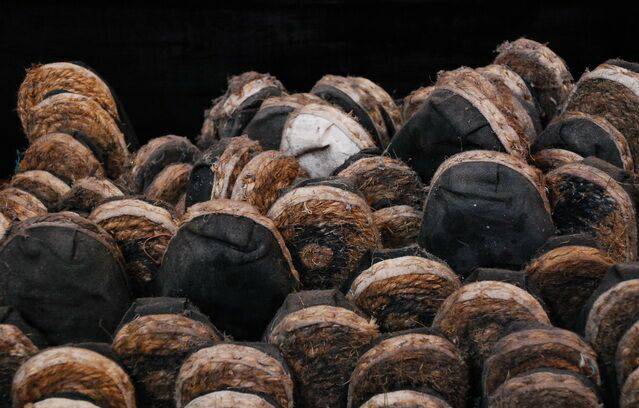
Alpargatas, footwear worn by the Discalced carmelites

A discalced (/dɪsˈkælst/ dis-KALST) religious order is one whose members go barefoot or wear sandals. These orders are often distinguished on this account from other branches of the same order. The custom of going unshod was introduced into the West by Saint Francis of Assisi for men and by Saint Clare of Assisi for women.

The word is derived from the Latin discalceātus, from dis ("apart", "away") and calceātus ("shoed"), from calceāre ("to provide with shoes"), from calceus ("shoe"), from calx ("heel").

== Discalceation ==
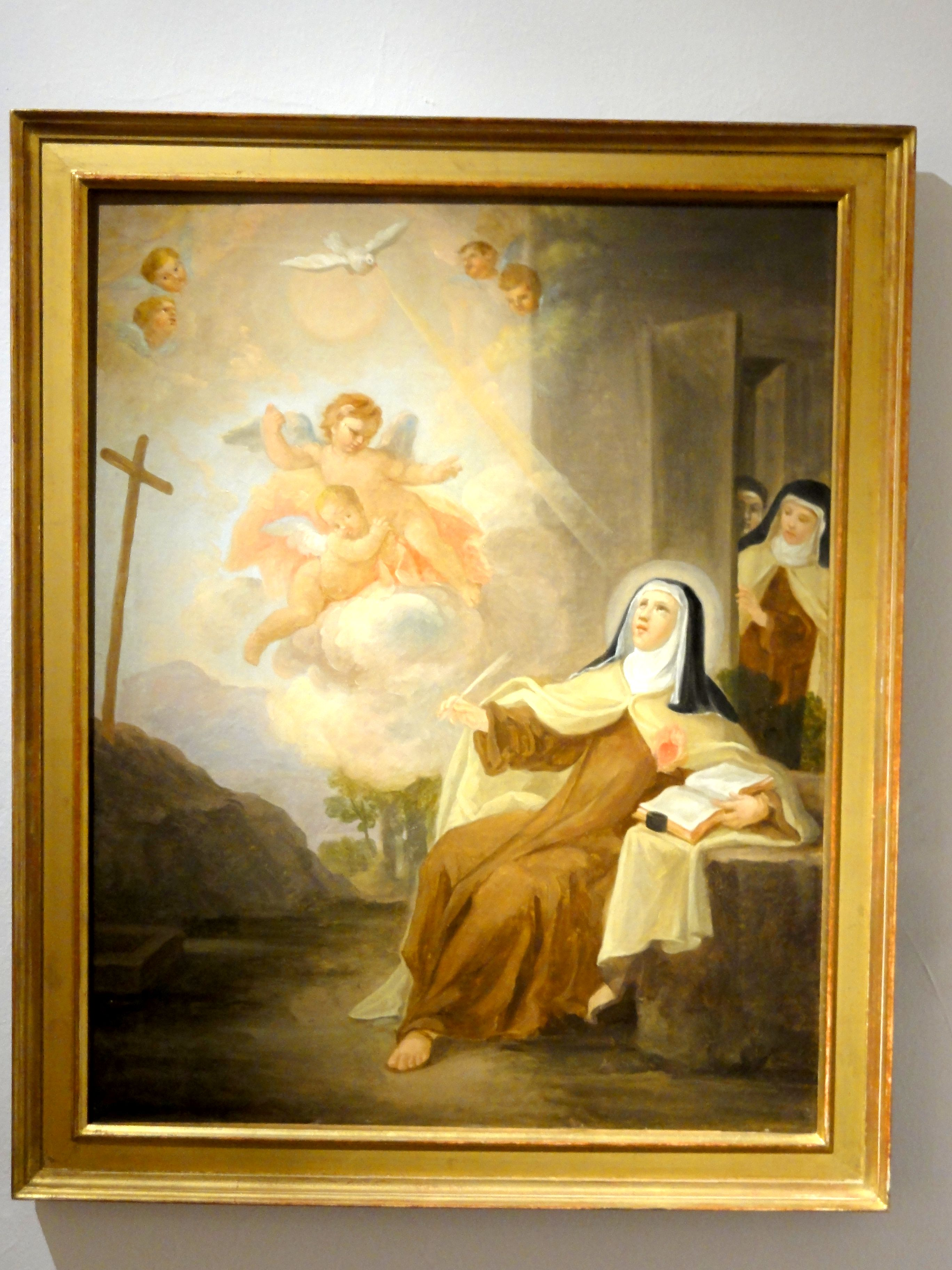
S. Teresa in ecstasy while writing her works and surprised by her sisters. French school, 18th century.

Discalceation means "removal of footwear". The nuns in the Carmelite reform convents erected by Teresa of Ávila abstained from wearing shoes, and were therefore indicated as discalced. She and St. John of the Cross were the founders of the Discalced Carmelites.

The origins of discalceation lie in Exodus 3:5, where God tells Moses: "Take off your sandals, for the place where you are standing is holy ground".

A separate custom in Biblical times of taking off only one shoe as part of a socially witnessed contract is referred to in Ruth 4:7 and Deuteronomy 25:9:

== History ==
After the various modifications of the Rule of Saint Francis, the Observants (who existed as an independent branch of the Franciscan Order before 1897) adhered to the custom of going unshod. The Minim friars and Capuchins followed in this practice. The Discalced Franciscans of Spain (known as Alcantarines, who formed a distinct branch of the Franciscan Order before 1897) went without footwear of any kind. The followers of St. Clare of Assisi at first went barefoot, but later came to wear sandals and shoes.

The Colettine and Capuchin nuns returned to the use of sandals. Sandals were also adopted by the Camaldolese monks of the Congregation of Monte Corona (1522), the Maronite Catholic monks, the Poor Hermits of St. Jerome of the Congregation of Blessed Peter of Pisa, the Augustinians of Thomas of Jesus (1532), the Barefooted Servites (1593), the Discalced Carmelites (1568), the Feuillants (Cistercians, 1575), the Trinitarians (1594), the Discalced Mercedarians (1604), and the Passionists (1720).
