= Le Grand Dictionnaire Historique =

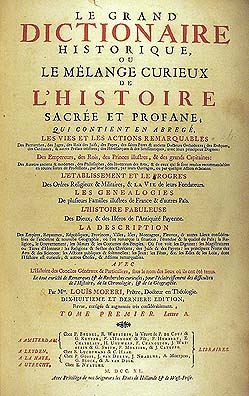
- Author: Louis Moréri

Le Grand Dictionnaire Historique was an encyclopedia originally compiled by the Catholic priest and theologian Louis Moréri (1643–1680). By later standards, it was highly specialized, for nearly all of its entries were on geographical and historical subjects, but it marked the start of a flood of other dictionaries and encyclopedias in Europe's vernaculars. In addition to being successful in its own right, Moréri's Grand Dictionnaire served as a springboard and foil for Pierre Bayle's Dictionnaire Historique et Critique (1697).

== Editions and expansions ==
Moréri's Grand Dictionnaire appeared in numerous French editions between 1674 and 1759, growing in size with each edition. Moréri himself died after preparing materials for the second edition (1681). Thereafter, other Francophone scholars took charge of the compilation, notably Jean Le Clerc. "Dictionnaire" was often spelled "Dictionaire" with one n.

== Translations ==
The Grand Dictionnaire was also translated and adapted into English, German, Dutch, and Spanish.

== Digitized online editions ==
- Moréri, Louis (1643–1680). Grand dictionnaire historique, ou le mélange curieux de l'histoire sacrée et profane [The Great Historical Dictionary or the Curious Mixture of Sacred and Profane History]
- 1674 (1st ed.) (1 Vol.). Lyon: Jean Girin (printer); Barthélemy Rivière (printer). OCLC 1040824202.
- See Grand Dictionnaire historique
1. 1 Vol." (1st ed.). 1674 – via Google Books (BML).
- 1681 (2nd ed.) (2 Vols.). OCLC 320759531, 1066418366, 320759530.
1. Vol. 1: "A–F" (2nd ed.). 1681 – via Google Books (BSB).
2. Vol. 2: "G–Z" (2nd ed.). 1681 – via Google Books (BML).
- 1683 (3rd ed.) (2 Vols.). OCLC 1066639065.
1. Vol. 1: "A–F" (3rd ed.). 1683 – via Google Books (UNIL).
2. Vol. 2: "G–Z" (3rd ed.). 1683 – via Google Books (BML).
- 1688 (5th ed. 2 Vols. + Supplément). OCLC 1066422148, 562162208, 887385704, 1025528373, 759626663.
1. Vol. 1: "A–F" (5th ed.). 1688 – via BnF Gallica.
2. Vol. 3. Supplément (6th ed.). 1689 – via Google Books (UNIL).
- 1694 (6th ed.) (4 Vols.).
1. Vol. 1: "A–B" (6th ed.). 1694 – via Google Books (British Library).
2. Vol. 2: "C–F" (6th ed.). 1692 – via Google Books (Ghent University Library).
3. Vol. 3: "G–M" (6th ed.). 1694 – via Google Books (British Library).
4. Vol. 4: "N–Z" (6th ed.). 1694 – via Google Books (British Library).
- 1698 (8th ed.) (4 Vols.). Corrected and enlarged by Monsieur [Jean] Le Clerc [1657–1736]. OCLC 718290644, 921294026, 1066532068, 20744934, 801184871.
1. Vol. 1: "A–B" (8th ed.). 1698 – via Google Books (BML).
2. Vol. 2: "C–F" (8th ed.). 1698 – via Google Books (BSB).
3. Vol. 3: "G–M" (8th ed.). 1698 – via Google Books (BSB).
4. Vol. 4: "N–Z" (8th ed.). 1698 – via Google Books (BML).
- 1702 (9th ed.).
1. Vol. 1: "A–Fus" (9th ed.). 1702 – via Google Books (KB original from Universiteitsbibliotheek Utrecht).
2. Vol. 3: "G–M" (9th ed.). 1702 – via Google Books (KB original from Universiteitsbibliotheek Utrecht).
3. Vol. 4: "N–Z" (9th ed.). 1702 – via Google Books (ÖN).
- 1704 (4 Vols.) (New and last ed.).
New and last edition revised, corrected and expanded by M. Vaultier & Father Ange (né Père Ange de Sainte-Rosalie; 1655–1726), Paris, Thierry, Coignard & Mariette, 4 volumes, 1704.
Pierre Bayle, Critical remarks on the new edition of Moréri's Historical Dictionary given in 1704, Rotterdam, Jean Hofhout, 1706.
1. Vol. 1: "A–B". 1707 – via Google Books (BML).
2. Vol. 2: "C–Fus". 1707 – via Google Books (BML).
3. Vol. 3: "Ga–Myt". 1707 – via Google Books (BML).
4. Vol. 4: "N–Z". 1707 – via Google Books (BML).
- 1711.
1. Vol. 2: "B–Che". 1711 – via Google Books (Ghent University Library).
2. Vol. 6: "M–O". 1711 – via Google Books (Ghent University Library).
- 1714.
1. "A–Z" – Supplément (Supplements the 1712 ed.). 1714 – via Google Books (BSB).
- 1716
1. Vol. 1: "A–H" – Supplément. 1716 – via Google Books (ÖN).
2. Vol. 2: "I–Z" – Supplément. 1716 – via Google Books (ÖN).
- 1717 (10th ed.)
1. Vol. 1: "A–B" (1717) (10th ed.).
2. Vol. 2: "C–F" (1717) (10th ed.).
3. Vol. 3: "G–M" (1717) (10th ed.).
4. Vol. 4: "N–Z" (1717) (10th ed.).
- 1725 (6 Vols.) (new and latest ed.).
Paris: Jean-Baptiste Cognard (1667–1735), ordinary printer to the King (Louis XIV) and to the French Academy, on Ruë Saint-Jacques, at (the sign of) the Bible d'Or.
1. Vol. 1: "A" (new and latest ed.). 1725 – via Google Books (NK).
2. Vol. 2: "C–D" (new and latest ed.). 1725 – via Google Books (BSB).
3. Vol. 3: "Ch–E" (new and latest ed.). 1725 – via Google Books (UNIL).
Paris: Denys Mariette (1685–1732), on Ruë Saint-Jacques, at the corner of rue des Noyers, at (the sign of) Rue Saint-Augustin and at (the sign of) l'Écu de Venise (a sign on a bygone street, Rue de Venise-en-la-Cité).
4. Vol. 4: "F–L" (new and latest ed.). 1725 – via Google Books (BSB).
5. Vol. 5: "M–P" (new and latest ed.). 1725 – via HathiTrust (UCM).
6. Vol. 6: "Q–Z (new and latest ed.). 1725 – via Google Books (BSB).
- 1732 (6 Vols.). Paris
1. Vol. 1: "A–Azz" (new and latest ed.). 1731 – via Google Books (BML).
2. Vol. 2: "Bea–Coq" (new and latest ed.). 1732 – via Google Books (UCM).
3. Vol. 3: "Cor–G" (new and latest ed.). 1732 – via HathiTrust (UCM).
4. Vol. 4: "H–Me" (new and latest ed.). 1732 – via Google Books (University of Lucerne).
5. Vol. 5: "Ma–P" (new and latest ed.). 1732 – via Google Books (University of Lucerne).
6. Vol. 6: "Q–Z. 1732 – via Google Books (University of Lucerne).

- 1735: Supplément (2 Vols.) by Claude-Pierre Goujet (1697–1767) (supplementing the 1732 Paris ed.). OCLC 1030791644, 1072562834, 1026708986, 314673369, 633612562, 1072562834, 1051485964 (Vol. 1), 1080047701 (Vol. 2).
1. Vol. 1: "A–L" – Supplément. 1735 – via Google Books (BML).
2. Vol. 2: "Mab–Z" – Supplément. 1735 – via Google Books (UCM).
- 1740 (8 Vols.) (18th ed.). LCCN 16-11550; OCLC 7453590, 995526097.
Vol. I includes a long preface tracing the history of previous editions and different translations.
1. Vol. 1: "A–Azz" (18th ed.). 1740 – via HathiTrust (Getty).
2. Vol. 2: "B–Che" (18th ed.). 1740 – via HathiTrust (Getty).
3. Vol. 3: "Che–E" (18th ed.). 1740 – via HathiTrust (Getty).
4. Vol. 4: "F–H" (18th ed.). 1740 – via HathiTrust (Getty).
5. Vol. 5: "I–L" (18th ed.). 1740 – via HathiTrust (Getty).
6. Vol. 6: "M–O" (18th ed.). 1740 – via HathiTrust (Getty).
7. Vol. 7: "P–Seg" (18th ed.). 1740 – via HathiTrust (Getty).
8. Vol. 8: "Seh–Z" (18th ed.). 1740 – via HathiTrust (Getty).
- 1749.
1. Nouveau Supplément (2 Vols.). 1749. OCLC 314673355, 10089640, 952659097.
  1. Vol. 1: "A–G". 1749 – via Google Books (UCM).
  2. Vol. 2: "H–Z". 1749 – via Google Books (BML).
- 1743–1749. (8 Vols.) (19th ed.). Sold in Venice at François Pitteri.
1. Vol. 16: "V–Z" (19 ed.). 1749 [M DCC XLIX] – via Google Books (University of Turin).
2. Le grand dictionnaire historique, ou le mélange curieux de l'histoire sacrée et profane [The Great Historical Dictionary, or the Curious Mixture of Sacred and Profane History]. Vol. 16 [Tome seizième]: "V–Z" (19th ed.). 1749 [MDCCXLIX].
  Qui contient, en abrégé, les vies et les actions remarquables des patriarches, des juges, des rois des juifs, des papes, des saints pères & anciens docteurs orthodoxes; Des évêques, des cardinaux, & autres prélats célèbres; des hérésiarques & des schismatiques, avec leurs principaux dogmes: des empereurs, des rois, des princes illustres, & des grands capitaines: des auteurs anciens & modernes, des philosophes, des inventeurs des arts, & de ceux qui se sont rendus recommandables en toutes fortes de professions, par leur science, par leurs ouvrages, ou par quelque action éclatante.
  L'établissement et le progrès des ordres religieux & militaires, & la vie de leurs fondateurs.
  es généalogies de plusieurs familles illustres de France & d'autres païs.
  L'histoire fabuleuse des dieux, & des héros de l'antiquité payenne.
  La description des empires, royaumes, républiques, provinces, villes, isles, montagnes, fleuves, & autres lieux considérables de l'ancienne & nouvelle géographie, où l'on remarque la situation, l'étendue & la qualité du païs; la religion, le gouvernement, les mœurs & les coutumes des peuples. Où l'on voit les dignitez: les sous-titres d'honneur: les religions & sectes des chrétiens, des juifs & des payens: les principaux noms des arts & des sciences: les actions publiques & solennelles: les jeux, les fêtes, &c. Les édits & les loix, dont l'histoire est curieuse; & autres choses, & actions remarquables.
  Avec l'histoire des conciles généraux et particuliers, sous le nom des lieux où ils ont été tenus.
  Le tout enrichi de remarques & de recherches curieuses, pour l'éclaircissement des difficultés de l'histoire, de la chronologie & de la géographie.
  Paris: Et se vend à Venise chez François Pitteri [sold in Venice by François Pitteri]. Via – Google Books (University of Turin) OCLC 1179267306, 17585580, 1403662424, 888690557
1. Vol. 1: "A" (19th ed.). 1743 – via Google Books (NK).
2. Vol. 2: "B" (19th ed.). 1743 – via HathiTrust (UCM).
3. Vol. 3: "C" (19th ed.). 1744 – via Google Books (UCM).
4. Vol. 4: "D" (19th ed.). 1745 – via HathiTrust (UCM).
5. Vol. 5: "H–L" (19th ed.). 1746 – via HathiTrust (UCM).
6. Vol. 6: "M–O" (19th ed.). 1747 – via HathiTrust (UCM).
7. Vol. 8: "T–Z" (19th ed.). 1749 – via Google Books (BSB).
- 1759 (10 Vols.) (Nouvelle éd) – via HathiTrust. LCCN 30-1229.
The 1735 Suppléments by Claude-Pierre Goujet (1697–1767) – in this edition – were reworked, revised, corrected, and augmented by Étienne François Drouet (1715–1779).
1. Vol. 4: "Con–E". 1759 – via Google Books (Ghent University Library).
2. Vol. 5: "F–Hha". 1759 – via Wikimedia Commons (Gallica).
3. Vol. 6: "Hi–L". 1759 – via Google Books (ÖN).
4. Vol. 7: "M–N". 1759 – via Google Books (ÖN).
5. Vol. 8: "O–Q" (new and latest ed.). 1759 – via Google Books (UCM).
6. Vol. 9: "R–S". 1759 – via Google Books (ÖN).
7. Vol. 10: "T–Z". 1759 – via Google Books (Ghent University Library).

=== English eds. ===
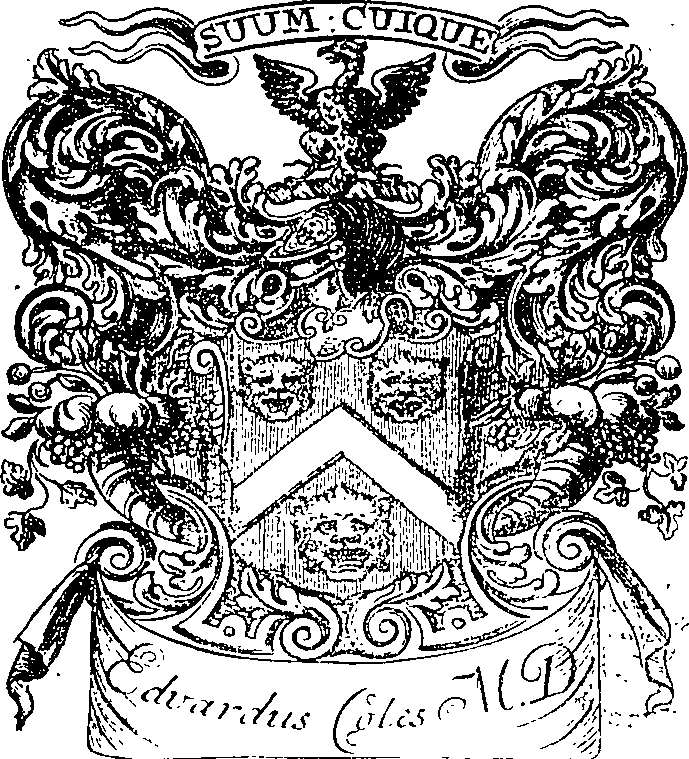

- English translation of 6th ed. (1694)
- English translation of 8th ed. (1701)
- The Great Historical, Geographical, Genealogical and Poetical Dictionary; Being a Curious Miscellany of Sacred and Prophane History (2 Vols.). English translation by Jeremy Collier (1650–1726) (English translation of the 8th ed.). London: Printed for (a) Henry Rhodes, near Bride-Lane in Fleetstreet; (b) Thomas Newborough, at the Golden-Bal in St. Paul's Church-Yard; (c) The assigns of L. Meredith, at the Star in St. Paul's Church-Yard; (d) Elizabeth Harris, at the Harrow in Little-Britain. 1701. OCLC 1525995 (all editions)
1. Vol. 1: "A–L" (English ed.). 1701 – via Internet Archive (Wellcome).
2. Vol. 2: "M–Z" (English ed.). 1701 – via Google Books (BNCF).
3. A Supplement to the Great Historical, Geographical, Genealogical and Poetical Dictionary: Being a Curious Miscellany of Sacred and Profane History (English ed.). 1705 – via Internet Archive ( Wellcome Library).
- 1727: Supplément. London: Printed by W. Bowyer, for C. Collier, Tho. Ward; and the executors of Henry Rhodes deceased. LCCN 30-1225; OCLC 645786127.

Luke Meredith – who been an apprentice to bookseller and publisher Richard Royston (1601–1686) – on March 26, 1687 (within six months after Royston's death), married Richard's granddaughter, Elizabeth Chiswell. She died before 1696 and was one of four children of, and only daughter of Richard Chiswell (1637–1711) (Wikidata Q18530779) and Mary Royston (1630–1698). Through Elizabeth, Luke Meredith was a cousin-in-law to Richard Chiswell (1673–1751). Among other things, Richard Royston and Luke Meredith had been connected to the Worshipful Company of Stationers and Newspaper Makers.

See Jeremy Collier § Dictionary

=== Spanish eds. ===
The Spanish edition was a translation of the six-volume Paris 1725 edition. It was published in 1753 – seventy-three years after Moréri's death and nine years after José Miravel Casadevante's death, its translator.

Spanish translation of 1725 ed.

- El gran diccionario histórico, o miscellanea curiosa de la historia sagrada y profana (8 Vols.). Spanish translation by José Miravel Casadevante. 1740. OCLC 995526097 (all editions)
- 1753 (8 Vols.). Louis Moréri, José Miravel Casadevante (pseudonym of José Antonio Miravel Herrera; 1690–1744), Frères de Tournes, floreció 1727-1781 (editor), Libraires associés (París, Francia) (editor). Paris and Leon: de Tournes Brothers, booksellers. OCLC 1430549350, 645092914, 3859234, 1080011277.
1. Vol. 1: "A–Azz" (in Spanish). 1753 – via Google Books (NYPL).
2. Vol. 2: "B–Cez" (in Spanish). 1753 – via Google Books (NYPL).
3. Vol. 3: "Cha–Czy" (in Spanish). 1753 – via Google Books (UCM).
4. Vol. 4: "F–H" (in Spanish). 1753 – via Google Books (UCM).
5. Vol. 6: "M–O" (in Spanish). 1753 – via HathiTrust (UCM).
6. Vol. 7: "P–R" (in Spanish). A costa de los libreros privilegiados. 1753 – via Internet Archive (UCM).
7. Vol. 8: "S–Tar" (in Spanish). 1753 – via Google Books (UCM).

=== Dutch eds. ===
- Groot Algemeen Historisch, Geographisch, Genealogisch en Oordeelkundig Woorden-Boek,
  Behelende Het voornaamste, dat vervat is in de Woorden-boeken van Morery, Bayle, Buddeus, enz.
  Als de Gehele
  Kerkelyke en Wereldlyke Geschiedenis;
  Of een kort begrip van de Levens en merkwaardigste Bedryven der Patriarchen, Rechters, Joodsche Koningen, Propheten, Apostelen, Vaders der Eerste Kerke, Pauzen, Kardinalen, Bisschoppen, Prelaten, voorname Godgeleerden, befaamde Ketters, en der zelver gevoelens, benevens een Historisch verhaal van de Concilien en Kerkvergaderingen, de instelling en voortgang van de Geestelyke en Wereldlyke Ordens, en de levens van der zelver stichters; Voorts de levensbedryven der Keizeren, Koningen, Keurvorsten, Vorsten, Opperveldheeren, vermaarde Krygshelden, uitmuntende Staatsdienaren, geleerde mannen, en der zelver werken, wysgeren, eerste uitvinders van kunsten, dichters, en in het algemeen van alle degenen, die zich in alle soorten van beroepingen door hunne wetenschappen, of uitmuntende bedryven hebben vermaard gemaakt;
  Als Mede
  Een Historisch Verhaal en Zedekundige Uitlegging
  van de oude Heidensche verdichtselen en fabelen, der zelven gewaande Goden en Godinnen, de aloude Eeuw-, Ren- en Schouwspelen, benevens degenen, die tegenwoordig by openbare en andere plegtigheden gebruikelyk zyn; als mede alle andere ceremoniën en gewoontens; de benamingen der waardigheden en eerampten; verscheidene kloostergeloften en gezindheden van Christenen, Joden en Heidenen; Wetten, Willekeuren, Plakkaten en Ordonnantiën, die in de geschiedenissen der byzondere rijken en staten aanmerkelyk zyn;
  Verder
  Eene Geographische, Staatkundige en Historische Beschryving
  van de Keizerryken, Koninkryken, Vorstendommen, Republyken, Landschappen, Eilanden, Gebergten, Rivieren, Steden, Kasteelen, Kloosters, en andere aanmerkelyke plaatsen der oude en nieuwe wereldbeschryving, met aanwyzinge van der zelver gelegenheid, naam, uitgestrektheid, oorsprong, staatsbestier, regeringswyze, godsdienst, wetten, zeden, gewoontens, enz. enz.
  Eindelyk
  Eene Zeer Nauwkeurige Genealogische Beschryving
  van de doorluchtige afkomsten der aloude en hedendaagsche gekroonde hoofden en aanzienlyke geslachten des gehelen aardbodems, der zelver verdeeling in stamhuizen en liniën, en van alle de voornaamste familien, byzonderlyk de Zeventien Nederlandsche Provincien betreffende.
  Alles in een nette order naar het alphabeth, en volgens de schikking, die de bovengemelde en andere vermaarde schryvers in hunne woorden-boeken in andere talen gehouden hebben, opgestelt, vertaalt, en met een aanzienlyk getal artikels doorgaans en alom, doch voornamentlyk ten opzichte van de zaken der Nederlanden, waar van andere woorden-boeken weinig of niets melden, uit allerlei zo gedrukte als geschrevene boeken, papieren, echte berichten en bewijzen (in Dutch). OCLC 64863242 (all editions).

1725. Under the supervision of David van Hoogstraten (1658–1724) and Matthæus Brouërius Van Nidek (1677–1742) (Wikidata – Wikidata Q99661736).

1. Vol. 1: "A–Aqu" (Dutch ed.). 1725 – via Google Books (KB).
2. Vol. 2: "Ar–Bzo" (Dutch ed.). 1725 – via Internet Archive (Boston).

1732. Amsterdam, Utrecht, The Hague: Brunel, de Wetsteins en Smith, Waesberge, de Wed. de Coup [The Widow of de Coup], Humbert. Willem van de Water. Leiden, Samuel Luchtmans (1685–1757). The widow of Adrian Moetjens, Van Dole, Vaillant.

1. Vol. 1: "A" (Dutch ed.). 1725 – via Internet Archive (Boston Public Library).
2. Vol. 2: "B" (Dutch ed.). 1725 – via Internet Archive (Boston Public Library).
3. Vol. 3: "C" (Dutch ed.). 1727 – via Internet Archive (Boston Public Library).
4. Vol. 4: "D–E" (Dutch ed.). 1727 – via Google Books (KB).
5. Vol. 5: "F, G, H" (Dutch ed.). 1727 – via Internet Archive (Boston Public Library).
6. Vol. 5: "F, G, H" (Dutch ed.). 1729 – via Google Books (Ghent).
7. Vol. 6: "J, K, L" (Dutch ed.). 1729 – via Google Books (Ghent).
8. Vol. 7: "M–N" (Dutch ed.). 1732 – via Internet Archive (Boston Public Library).
9. Vol. 8: "O, P, Q" (Dutch ed.). 1732 – via Google Books (Ghent).
10. Vol. 9: "R–S" (Dutch ed.). 1732 – via Google Books (Ghent).
Under the Supervision of David van Hoogstraten (1658–1724) and Jan Lodewyk Schuer (aka Jan Lodewijk Schuër; c. 1698–1740).
11. Vol. 10: "T–Z" (Dutch ed.). 1733 – via Google Books (Ghent).

1933 ed. (5 Vols.)

1. Vol. 1: "A–B" (Dutch ed.). 1733 – via Google Books (KB).
2. Vol. 2: "C–F" (Dutch ed.). 1733 – via Google Books (KB).
3. Vol. 3: "G–L" (Dutch ed.). 1733 – via Google Books (KB).
4. Vol. 4: "M–Q" (Dutch ed.). 1733 – via Google Books (KB).

=== German eds. ===
- 1709 (1st ed.). Allgemeines Historisches Lexicon, in welchem das Leben und die Thaten der Patriarchen, Propheten, Apostel, Väter der ersten Kirchen, Päbste, Cardinale, Bischöffe, Prälaten, vornehmer Gottes-Gelährten, nebst denen Ketzern wie nicht weniger der Käyser, Könige, Chur- und Fürsten, grosser Helden und Ministern ingleichen der berühmten Gelährten, Scribenten und Künstler ferner ausführliche Nachrichten von den ansehnlichsten gräflichen, adelichen und andern Familien, von Conciliis, Münchs- und Ritter-Orden, heydnischen Göttern, etc. und endlich die Beschreibungen der Käyserthümer, Königreiche, Fürstenthümer, freyer Staaten, Landschafften, Inseln, Städte, Schlösser, Klöster, Gebürge, Flüsse und so fort, in alphabetischer Ordnung mit bewährten Zeugnissen vorgestellet werden [General Historical Lexicon, in which the lives and deeds of the patriarchs, prophets, apostles, fathers of the early churches, popes, cardinals, bishops, prelates, eminent theologians, along with the Heretics, as well as those of the emperors, kings, electors, and princes, great heroes, and ministers; likewise of the renowned scholars, writers, and artists; furthermore, detailed accounts of the most distinguished countly, noble, and other families, of church councils, monastic and knightly orders, pagan gods, etc.; and finally, the descriptions of the empires, kingdoms, principalities, free states, regions, islands, cities, castles, monasteries, mountains, rivers, and so forth; presented in alphabetical order with verified sources]. Preface by Johann Franz Buddeus (1667–1729). Leipzig: Published by Thomas Fritsch (bookseller) (1666–1726). OCLC 8086052 (all editions).
1. Vols. 1 & 2 ("Erster und Ander Theil"): "A–G". 1709 – via Google Books (ÖN).
2. Vols. 3 & 4 ("Dritter und Vierter Theil"): "H–Z + Appendix". 1709 – via Google Books (ÖN).
3. Vols. 3 & 4 ("Dritter und Vierter Theil"): "H–Z + Appendix". 1709 – via Google Books (ÖN).
- 1722 (2nd ed.). Allgemeines Historisches Lexicon, das Leben und die Thaten in welchem derer Patriarchen, Propheten, Apostel, Vätter der ersten Kirchen, Päbste, Cardinäle, Bischöffe, Prälaten, vornehmer Gottes-Gelährten, nebst denen Ketzern; wie nicht weniger derer Käyser, Könige, Chur- und Fürsten, grosser Herren und Ministern; ingleichen derer berühmten Gelährten, Scribenten und Künstler; ferner ausführliche Nachrichten von den ansehnlichsten Gräflichen, Adelichen und andern Familien, von Conciliis, Münchs- und Ritter-Orden, Heydnischen Göttern, u. und endlich die Beschreibungen derer Käyserthümer, Königreiche, Fürstenthümer, freyer Staaten, Landschafften, Inseln, Städte, Schlösser, Klöster, Gebürge, Flüsse und so fort, in alphabetischer Ordnung mit bewährten Zeugnissen vorgestellet werden [General Historical Lexicon, containing the lives and deeds in which the patriarchs, prophets, apostles, fathers of the early churches, popes, cardinals, bishops, prelates, eminent theologians, along with the heretics; as well as the emperors, kings, electors and princes, great lords, and ministers are recorded. Also included are notable scholars, writers, and artists; along with detailed accounts of the most prominent noble, aristocratic, and other distinguished families, of councils, monastic and knightly orders, heathen gods, and finally the descriptions of the empires, kingdoms, principalities, free states, regions, islands, cities, castles, monasteries, mountains, rivers, and more, arranged alphabetically and presented with verified sources] (2nd & enlarged ed.). Leipzig: Published by Thomas Fritsch (bookseller) (1666–1726).
1. Vol. 1 ("Erster Theil"): "A–C". 1722 – via Google Books (BSB).
2. Vol. 2 ("Andrer Theil"): "D–K". 1722 – via Google Books (BSB).
3. Vol. 3 ("Dritter Theil"): "L–M". 1722 – via Google Books (BSB).
4. Vol. 4 ("Vierter Theil"): "N–Z + Appendix". 1722 – via Google Books (BSB).

=== Other online eds. ===
Online availability: Dictionnaire de Moréri and also here.

== Bibliography ==
=== References ===
- Collison, Robert Lewis (1914–1989) [at Wikidata] (1964). Encyclopaedias: Their History Throughout the Ages – A Bibliographical Guide With Extensive Historical Notes to the General Encyclopaedias Issued Throughout the World From 350 B.C. to the Present Day. New York & London: Hafner Publishing Company. pp. 88–89 – via Internet Archive. LCCN 65-889; OCLC 368968 (all editions).
- Hodgson, Norma; Blagden, Cyprian (1953). The Notebook of Thomas Bennet and Henry Clements (1686-1719) – With Some Aspects of Book Trade Practice. New Series. Vol. 6. Oxford Bibliographical Society.
1. Via Internet Archive (Trent). pp. 78–79.
Henry Clements (1686–1719) was a son of Henry Clements (Sr.), bookseller of Oxford. In 1703, he apprenticed to Thomas Bennet (1664–1706), whose business he succeeded. In 1707 free of the Stationers' Company.
- Miller, Arnold (1981). Kafker, Frank A. [at Wikidata] (ed.). "Louis Moréri's Grand Dictionnaire historique" in Notable Encyclopedias of the Seventeenth and Eighteenth Centuries: Nine Predecessors of the Encyclopédie. Oxford: Voltaire Foundation. pp. 13–52. ISBN 978-0-7294-0467-9, 0-7294-0467-6; OCLC 30787125 (all editions).
- Paul, Ina Ulrike [in German] (2021). "Camels in the Alps? Translation, Transfer, and Adaptation in Dutch Encyclopedias and Their European Predecessors" (PDF). In Donato, Clorinda; Lüsebrink, Hans-Jürgen [in German] (eds.). Translation and Transfer of Knowledge in Encyclopedic Compilations, 1680–1830 (PDF). The UCLA Clark Memorial Library Series. University of Toronto Press in association with the UCLA Center for Seventeenth-and Eighteenth-Century Studies and the William Andrews Clark Memorial Library. Retrieved February 16, 2025. ISBN 978-1-4875-0890-6, 978-1-4875-3927-6, ISBN 978-1-4875-3926-9; OCLC 1237829497 (all editions); JSTOR 10.3138/j.ctv2sm3b6c.7 (chapter 3); OCLC 10023025482 (chapter 3).
