= Angel Baffard =

Augustinian friar and genealogist (1655–1726)

Angel Baffard (Angel of St. Rosalie, French: Ange de Sainte-Rosalie) (1655–1726) was a French genealogist and friar of the Order of Discalced Augustinians.

== Biography ==
He was born François Baffard in 1655 in Blois, in the ancient province of Orléanais. After making his religious profession in 1672, he filled many important offices in the priories of his Order, and finally devoted himself to the study of genealogy, contributing extensively to Le Grand Dictionnaire historique of Louis Moréri.

From the materials collected by Anselm de Guibours, a distinguished scholar and friar of the same Order, and the nobleman, Caille du Fourny, he prepared a revision of Guibours' Histoire généalogique et chronologique de la maison royale de France et des grands officiers de la couronne, which was left unfinished at Baffard's own death, which occurred in Paris in 1726, shortly before the revised first volume was published.

The work was finally completed by Simplicien Lucas, his collaborator in the project begun by Guibours. The latter also prepared three additional volumes.

Baffard's other works include L'Etat de la France, edited in 1749 by the Benedictines of Saint-Maur, with a supplementary volume on the coronation, the armorial bearings, and prerogatives of the kings of France.
