= Joseph Rickaby =

English Jesuit priest and philosopher

Joseph Rickaby

Joseph John Rickaby, SJ (1845 – 1932) was an English Jesuit priest and philosopher.

== Life ==
Rickaby was born in 1845 in Everingham, York. He received his education at Stonyhurst College, and was ordained in 1877, one of the so-called Stonyhurst Philosophers, a significant group for neo-scholasticism in England, along with Richard F. Clarke, Herbert Lucas, and his own brother, John Rickaby. At the time he was at St Beuno's, he was on friendly terms with Gerard Manley Hopkins; they were ordained on the same day.

He was affiliated with Clarke's Hall in Worcester College, Oxford, and would deliver conferences to Catholic undergraduates of Oxford and Cambridge. His work is quoted by Charles E. Raven in Science, Religion, and The Future (1943, p. 9).

== Works ==
- Aquinas Ethicus, a translation of the principal portions of the Second Part of the Summa Theologica, in two volumes: Volume 1 and Volume 2 (1892)
- The First Principles of Knowledge (1888)
- Notes on St. Paul: Corinthians, Galatians, Romans (1898)
- Oxford & Cambridge Conferences 1897-1899 (1899)
- Political and Moral Essays (1902)
- Free Will and Four English Philosophers: Hobbes, Locke, Hume and Mill (1906)
- The Divinity of Christ a lecture(1906)
- Scholasticism (1908)
- Four-Square: or, The Cardinal Virtues (1908)
- Newman Memorial Sermon (1910)
- An Index to the Works of John Henry Cardinal Newman (1914)
- Moral Philosophy: Ethics, Deontology and Natural Law (1918)
- Practice of Perfection and Christian Virtues, a translation from the original Spanish of Alphonsus (Alonso) Rodriguez's Ejercicio de Perfección y Virtudes Cristianas, complete in two volumes (1929).
- God and His Creatures (annotated, abridged translation of the Summa Contra Gentiles), by Saint Thomas Aquinas (1905)
