= Simplicien Lucas =

French Augustinian friar and scholar

Simplicien Lucas, O.A.D., (Father Simplician, or French: Père Simplicien), (1683–1759) was a noted French genealogist and a friar of the Order of Discalced Augustinians at the priory of the Order, commonly called the Couvent des Petits Pères, attached to the popular Basilica of Our Lady of Victories in Paris.

He was born Paul Lucas in 1683. The details of his birth and early life have not survived.

He is noted for his work together with another friar of his monastery, Father Angel of St. Rosalie, on the revision of the monumental history of the Royal House of France entitled Histoire généalogique et chronologique de la maison royale de France et des grands officiers de la couronne, that had been initiated by an earlier member of the same community, Père Anselme or Father Anselm (died 1694). They took up the project after the death in 1713 of the second editor of the project, the nobleman Honoré Caille du Fourny, who had edited Father Anselm's notes after his death and published a revised edition in 1712.

It was Father Simplicien who published a further revision in 1726, following the sudden death of his mentor and collaborator, Father Angel, that year. He himself went on to publish several new volumes, completing the project.

Lucas died at the priory of his Order in Paris in 1759.
