= Jeremy Collier =

English theatre critic, non-juror bishop and theologian (1650–1726)

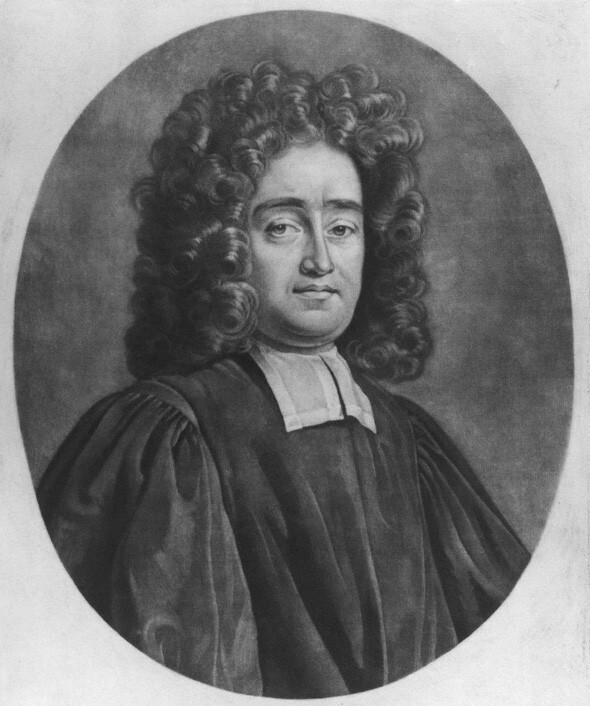
Jeremy Collier

Jeremy Collier (/ˈkɒliər/; 23 September 1650 – 26 April 1726) was an English theatre critic, non-juror bishop and theologian.

== Life ==
Jeremiah (Jeremy) Collier was born in Stow cum Quy, Cambridgeshire, the son of Jeremy Collier, a schoolmaster. He was educated at Ipswich School under his father, and at Gonville and Caius College, Cambridge, graduating BA (1673), MA (1676).

Collier was ordained deacon in 1676 and priest in 1678. He became chaplain to the Countess of Dorset, and rector of Ampton, Suffolk, from 1679 to 1685.

A supporter of James II, he refused, as a nonjuror (see Nonjuring schism) to take the oath of allegiance to William III and Mary II after the Glorious Revolution. Furthering his obvious disapproval of the new monarchs, he publicly absolved two Jacobites who had conspired to assassinate the King and Queen. In 1713 he was consecrated a non-juror bishop by George Hickes and two Scottish bishops, Archibald Campbell and James Gadderar.

== Works ==
Collier was the primus of the nonjuring line and a strong supporter of the four usages. (see Nonjuring schism) In the years following the Revolution he wrote a series of tracts questioning the legitimacy of the new monarchs and the deprival of the Non-juror bishops. He was well known for his Ecclesiastical History of Great Britain, 1708–1714, which was attacked for its tendentious political and theological comments, but nevertheless widely used. His Reasons for restoring some prayers and directions, as they stand in the communion-service of the first English reform'd liturgy, 1717 was the first salvo in the usages debate. His Essays were popular in his own day but are now little read. Collier wrote anti-theatrical polemic but was a high-church monarchist, unlike the many Puritans who wrote in this genre as well. Collier also translated the Meditations of Marcus Aurelius into English.

=== Collier Controversy ===
In the history of English drama, Collier is known for his anti-theatrical attack on the comedy of the 1690s in his Short View of the Immorality and Profaneness of the English Stage (1698), which draws for its ammunition mostly on the plays of William Congreve, John Vanbrugh, John Dryden, and Thomas D'Urfey. At the start of the English Civil War (1642) theatres were closed and in 1647 a law was passed to punish anyone who participated in or viewed drama. After the war, and during the English Interregnum, the Puritans, under Oliver Cromwell, had control of most of the English government. They placed heavy restrictions on entertainment and entertainment venues that were perceived as being pagan or immoral. In the English Restoration (1660), playwrights reacted against the Puritanical restrictions with much more decadent plays. The plays produced in the Restoration drew comparisons to the great Elizabethan dramas by critics of the day. However, these plays were considered vulgar because they mocked and disrespected marriage, morals, and the clergy. Furthermore, King Charles II allowed women to act on stage; some of the first actresses were of ill-repute. Collier's pamphlets sought to stem the spread of vice but turned out to be the sparks that kindled a controversial flame between like-minded Puritans and Restoration dramatists.

Collier devotes nearly 300 pages to decry what he perceived as profanity and moral degeneration in the stage productions of the era. This ranged from general attacks on the morality of Restoration theatre to very specific indictments of playwrights of the day. Collier argued that a venue as influential as the theatre—it was believed then that the theatre should be providing moral instruction—should not have content that is morally detrimental. These pamphlets began a pamphlet war between Collier and some playwrights like Vanbrugh. Many of the playwrights responded with equally vehement attacks, but some were so deeply affected, they withdrew from theatre permanently or substantially changed their approach to writing comedies, Congreve amongst them.

== Aftermath ==
Although the theatre styles of the Restoration lasted a while even after Collier's pamphlets, a new and more restrained theatre began to develop due, in part, to Collier's critiques. Due to the strict morals of the Puritans as well as others such as Collier, neoclassical drama began to emerge even while Restoration drama was still flourishing. During Collier's time, Societies for the Reformation of Manners dedicated themselves to maintaining honour in playhouses.

== Dictionary ==
Collier published an early encyclopedia in 1701, The Great Historical, Geographical, Genealogical and Poetical Dictionary. He freely admitted that the text was based on a number of earlier historians, but especially out of the eighth edition of Louis Moréri's Grand Dictionnaire Historique. This was issued in two volumes in London from 1701 to 1705 with an appendix covering the time period from 1688 "by another hand" being issued in the latter year. A further appendix was issued in 1721 and a second edition in 1727. The work was not considered a success as Collier's additions were not of the same quality as the source text and it came out during the same period as the Lexicon Technicum.

== Death ==
Collier died on 26 April 1726 and was buried on 29 April in Old St Pancras Churchyard. The grave is lost but Collier is not listed on the Burdett-Coutts Memorial to the important graves lost therein.
