= Anselm de Guibours =

Anselm de Guibours (born 1625) (Father Anselm of the Blessed Mary, O.A.D., French: Père Anselme de Sainte-Marie, or simply Père Anselme) was a French Discalced Augustinian friar and noted genealogist.

== Biography ==
He was born Pierre de Guibours in Paris in 1625, where he entered the Order of the Discalced Augustinians on 31 March 1644. It was in their monastery (called the Couvent des Petits Pères), attached to the popular Basilica of Our Lady of Victories, that he lived for the next fifty years, dying there on 17 January 1694.

Guibours devoted his entire life to genealogical studies. In 1663, he published Le Palais de l'honneur (The Palace of honor), which, besides giving the genealogy of the houses of Lorraine and Savoy, is a complete treatise on heraldry. This was followed the following year by Le Palais de la gloire (The Palace of Glory), dealing with the genealogy of various illustrious French and European families.

These books made friends for him, the most intimate among whom, Honoré Caille, Seigneur du Fourny (1630–1713), persuaded him to publish his Histoire généalogique et chronologique de la maison royale de France, et des grands officiers de la couronne (1674, 2 vols.). After Father Anselm's death, Fourny collected the friar's papers and brought out a new edition of this highly important work in 1712.

After Fourny's death in 1713, the task was taken up and continued by two other friars of the monastery where Father Anselm had spent his life: Father Angel of St. Rosalie (1655–1726), together with Father Simplician (1683–1759), who published the first and second volumes of the third edition in 1726. This edition consists of nine volumes folio. It is a genealogical and chronological history of the Royal House of France, of the Peers of France, of the great officers of the Kingdom of France, of the king's household and of the ancient barons of the kingdom.

The notes were generally compiled from original documents, references to which are usually given, so that they remain useful to the present day. The work of Father Anselm, his collaborators and successors, is even more important for the history of France than is William Dugdale's Baronage of England for the history of England.
