= Honoré Caille du Fourny =

French genealogist

Honoré Caille, seigneur du Fourny (1630–1713) was a French genealogist.

An examiner at the Court of Accounts in Paris, he collected the papers of the noted genealogist Père Anselme after his death in 1694, and in 1712 published a new edition of Father Anselm's great work, the Histoire généalogique et chronologique de la maison royale de France, et des grands officiers de la couronne.

After his death, this work was continued by Father Angel of St. Rosalie (1655–1726) and Father Simplicien (1683–1759), both friars, like Father Anselm, at the Couvent des Petits Pères, a priory of the Discalced Augustinians in Paris attached to the Basilica of Our Lady of Victories.
