= Francisco Suárez =

Spanish priest, philosopher and theologian

The Reverend Francisco Suárez SJ
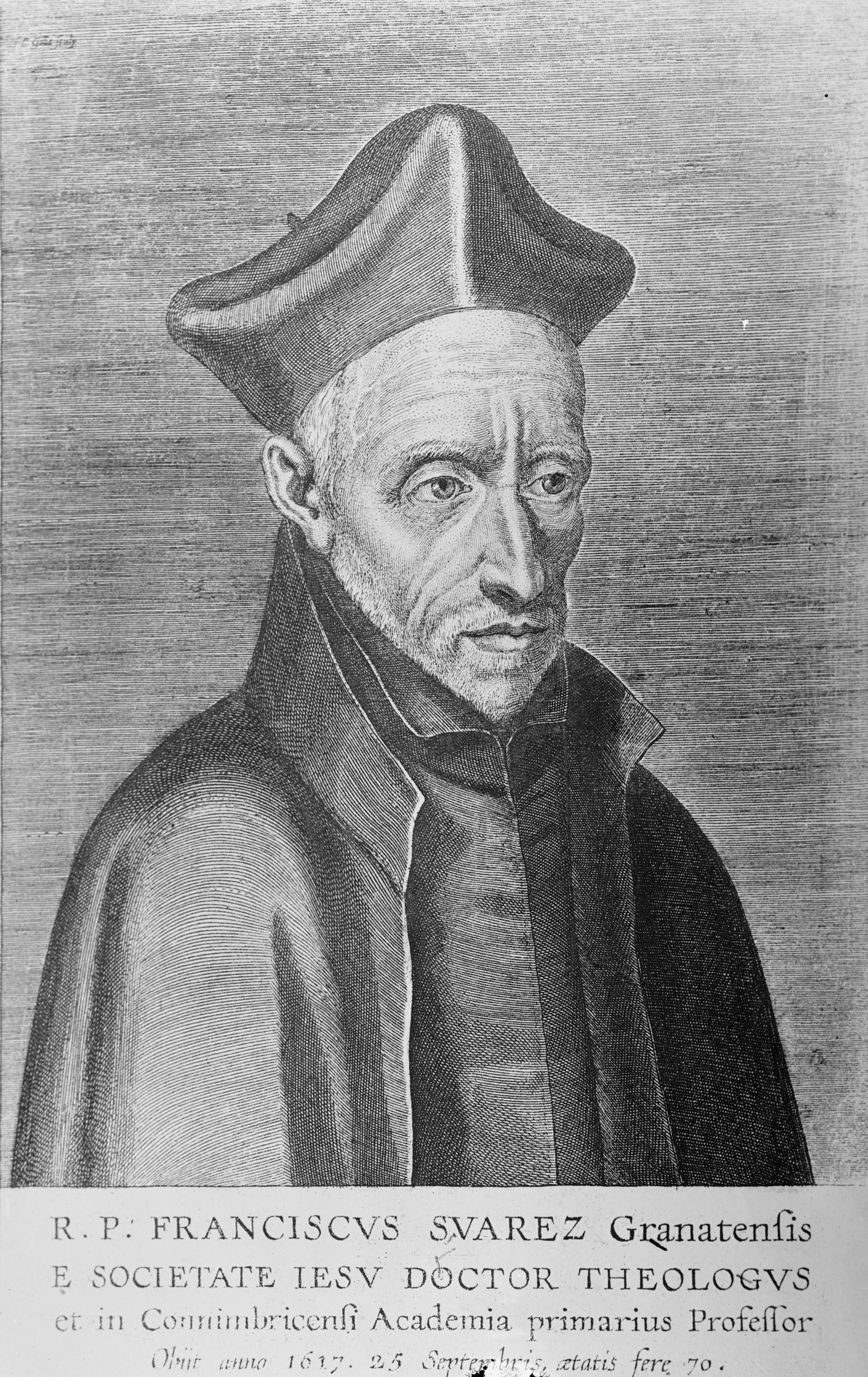
- Born: 5 January 1548; Granada, Kingdom of Granada, Crown of Castille
- Died: 25 September 1617 (aged 69); Lisbon, Iberian Union
- Other name: Doctor Eximius

Education
- Education: University of Salamanca
- Academic advisor: Alonso Rodriguez

Philosophical work
- Era: Early modern philosophy: Baroque philosophy
- Region: Western philosophy: Spanish philosophy
- School: Scholasticism; Medieval realism School of Salamanca
- Institutions: University of Salamanca; University of Coimbra
- Main interests: Theology, metaphysics
- Notable ideas: Metaphysics's object: only real being as being

Francisco Suárez (/ˈswɑːrɛz/; 5 January 1548 – 25 September 1617) was a Spanish Jesuit priest, philosopher and theologian, one of the leading figures of the School of Salamanca movement. His work is considered a turning point in the history of second scholasticism, marking the transition from its Renaissance to its Baroque phases. According to Christopher Shields and Daniel Schwartz, "figures as distinct from one another in place, time, and philosophical orientation as Leibniz, Grotius, Pufendorf, Schopenhauer and Heidegger, all found reason to cite him as a source of inspiration and influence."

== Life and career ==
Francisco Suárez was born in Granada, Andalusia (southern Spain), on 5 January 1548. He was the youngest son of a noble family formed by the lawyer Gaspar Suárez de Toledo and his wife Antonia Vázquez de Utiel.

After 3 years of preliminary studies from age 10 onwards, in 1561 Suárez matriculated at the University of Salamanca, and studied law. In 1564, at age sixteen, Suárez entered the Society of Jesus in Salamanca and went through the two years of intense spiritual training under the guidance of Fr. Alonso Rodriguez. In August 1566, Suárez took his first vows as a Jesuit; he then began in October 1566 to study theology at Salamanca. It seems he was not a promising student at first; in fact, he nearly gave up his matters of study after failing the entrance exam twice. After passing the exam at third attempt, though, things changed.

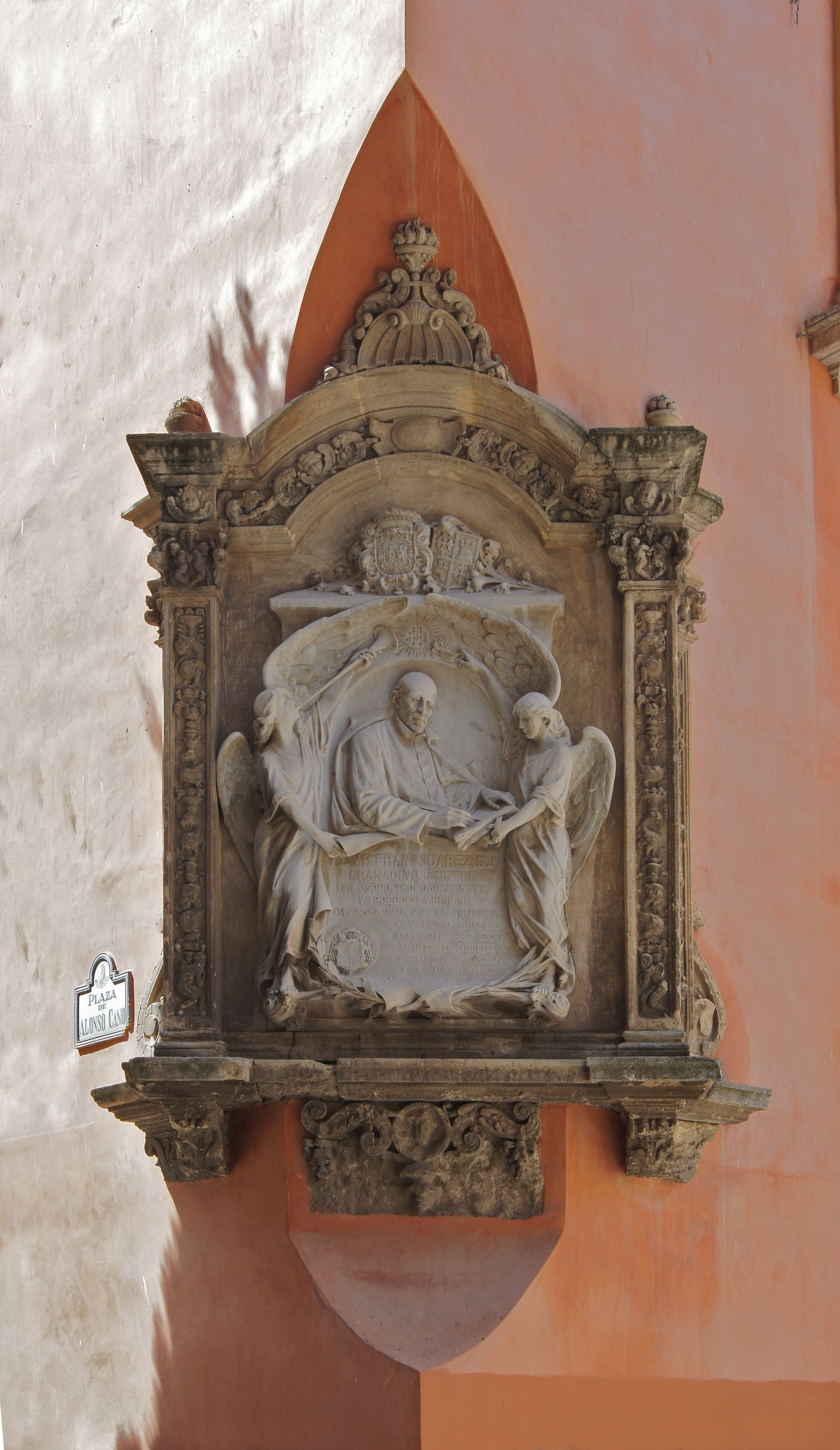
Monument in Granada, Spain, where he was born

In 1570, with the completion of his course, Suárez began to teach philosophy, first at Salamanca as a Scholastic tutor, and then as a professor in the Jesuit college at Segovia. He was ordained in March 1572 in Segovia. He continued to teach philosophy in Segovia until, in September 1574, he moved to the Jesuit College in Valladolid to teach theology, a subject he would then teach for the rest of his life. He taught in a succession of different places: Ávila (1575), Segovia (1575), Valladolid (1576) Rome (1580–85), Alcalá (1585–92) and Salamanca (1592–97). In 1597, he moved to Coimbra, some years after the accession of the Spanish (elder line) House of Habsburg to the Portuguese Throne, to take up the principal chair of Theology at the University of Coimbra. He remained there, aside from a brief time teaching at Rome, until his death in 1617.

He wrote on a wide variety of subjects, producing a vast amount of work (his complete works in Latin amount to twenty-six volumes). Suárez's writings include treatises on law, the relationship between Church and State, metaphysics, and theology. He is considered the godfather of international law. His Disputationes metaphysicae (Metaphysical Disputations) were widely read in Europe during the 17th century and are considered by some scholars to be his most profound work.

Suárez was regarded during his lifetime as being the greatest living philosopher and theologian, and given the nickname Doctor Eximius et Pius ("Exceptional and Pious Doctor"); Pope Gregory XIII attended his first lecture in Rome. Pope Paul V invited him to refute the arguments of James I of England, and wished to retain him near his person, to profit by his knowledge. Philip II of Spain sent him to the University of Coimbra in order to give it prestige, and when Suárez visited the University of Barcelona, the doctors of the university went out to meet him wearing the insignia of their faculties.

After his death in Portugal (in either Lisbon or Coimbra) his reputation grew still greater, and he had a direct influence on such leading philosophers as Hugo Grotius, René Descartes, John Norris, and Gottfried Leibniz. His library was sent to Ethiopia in the mid-17th century, although many of the books went missing, with some of the books arriving in Portuguese Goa. He is buried in the Igreja de São Roque (formerly a Jesuit church) in Lisbon.

== Philosophical thought ==
His most important philosophical achievements were in metaphysics and the philosophy of law. He adhered to a moderate form of Thomism and developed metaphysics as a systematic enquiry.

=== Metaphysics ===
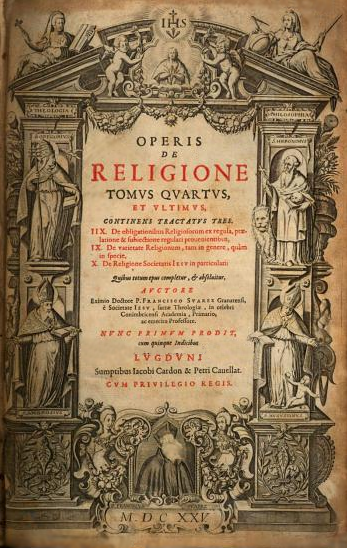
Operis de religione (1625).

For Suárez, metaphysics was the science of real essences (and existence); it was mostly concerned with real being rather than conceptual being, and with immaterial rather than with material being. He held (along with earlier scholastics) that essence and existence are the same in the case of God (see ontological argument), but disagreed with Aquinas and others that the essence and existence of finite beings are really distinct. He argued that in fact they are merely conceptually distinct: rather than being really separable, they can only logically be conceived as separate.

On the vexed subject of universals, he endeavored to steer a middle course between the realism of Duns Scotus and the nominalism of William of Occam. His position is a little bit closer to nominalism than that of Thomas Aquinas. Sometimes he is classified as a moderate nominalist, but his admitting of objective precision (praecisio obiectiva) ranks him with moderate realists. The only veritable and real unity in the world of existences is the individual; to assert that the universal exists separately ex parte rei would be to reduce individuals to mere accidents of one indivisible form. Suárez maintains that, though the humanity of Socrates does not differ from that of Plato, yet they do not constitute realiter one and the same humanity; there are as many "formal unities" (in this case, humanities) as there are individuals, and these individuals do not constitute a factual, but only an essential or ideal unity ("In such a way, that many individuals, which are said to be of the same nature, are so: only through the operation of the intellect, not through a substance or essence of things which unites them"). The formal unity, however, is not an arbitrary creation of the mind, but exists "in the nature of the thing, prior [ontologically] to any operation of the intellect".

His metaphysical work, giving a remarkable effort of systematisation, is a real history of medieval thought, combining the three schools available at that time: Thomism, Scotism and Nominalism. He is also a deep commentator of Arabic or high medieval works. He enjoyed the reputation of being the greatest metaphysician of his time. He thus founded a school of his own, Suarism or Suarezianism, the chief characteristic principles of which are:

- the principle of individuation by the proper concrete entity of beings
- the rejection of pure potentiality of matter
- the singular as the object of direct intellectual cognition
- a distinctio rationis ratiocinatae between the essence and the existence of created beings
- the possibility of spiritual substance only numerically distinct from one another
- ambition for the hypostatic union as the sin of the fallen angels
- the Incarnation of the Word, even if Adam had not sinned
- the solemnity of the vow only in ecclesiastical law
- the system of Congruism that modifies Molinism by the introduction of subjective circumstances, as well as of place and of time, propitious to the action of efficacious grace, and with predestination ante praevisa merita
- the possibility of holding one and the same truth by both science and faith
- the belief in Divine authority contained in an act of faith
- the production of the body and blood of Christ by transubstantiation as constituting the Eucharistic sacrifice
- the final grace of the Blessed Virgin Mary superior to that of the angels and saints combined.

Suárez made an important investigation of being, its properties and division in Disputationes Metaphysicae (1597), which influenced the further development of theology within Catholicism. In the second part of the book, disputations 28–53, Suárez fixes the distinction between ens infinitum (God) and ens finitum (created beings). The first division of being is that between ens infinitum and ens finitum. Instead of dividing being into infinite and finite, it can also be divided into ens a se and ens ab alio, i.e., being that is from itself and being that is from another. A second distinction corresponding to this one:ens necessarium and ens contingens, i.e., necessary being and contingent being. Still another formulation of the distinction is between ens per essentiam and ens per participationem, i.e., being that exists by reason of its essence and being that exists only by participation in a being that exists on its own (eigentlich). This distinction had just been formerly adopted by St. Thomas Aquinas in his Summa Theologica. A further distinction is between ens increatum and ens creatum, i.e., uncreated being and created, or creaturely, being. A final distinction is between being as actus purus and being as ens potentiale, i.e., being as pure actuality and being as potential being. Suárez decided in favor of the first classification of the being into ens infinitum and ens finitum as the most fundamental, in connection with which he accords the other classifications their due. In the last disputation 54 Suárez deals with entia rationis (beings of reason), which are impossible intentional objects, i.e. objects that are created by our minds but cannot exist in actual reality.

=== Theology ===
In theology, Suárez attached himself to the doctrine of Luis Molina, the celebrated Jesuit professor of Évora. Molina tried to reconcile the doctrine of predestination with the freedom of the human will and the predestinarian teachings of the Dominicans by saying that the predestination is consequent upon God's foreknowledge of the free determination of man's will, which is therefore in no way affected by the fact of such predestination. Suárez endeavoured to reconcile this view with the more orthodox doctrines of the efficacy of grace and special election, maintaining that, though all share in an absolutely sufficient grace, there is granted to the elect a grace which is so adapted to their peculiar dispositions and circumstances that they infallibly, though at the same time quite freely, yield themselves to its influence. This mediatizing system was known by the name of "congruism."

=== Philosophy of law ===
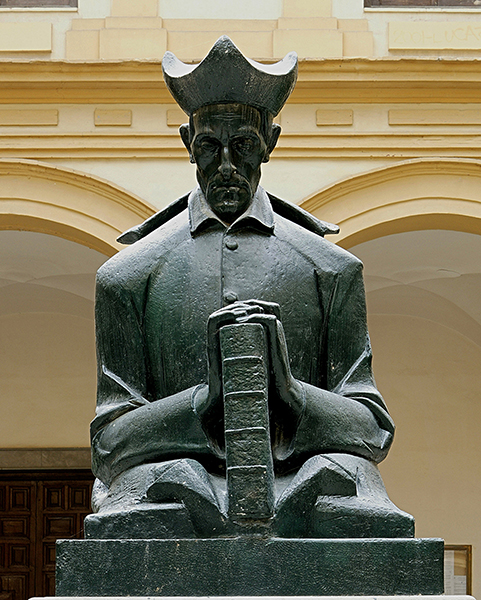
Monument of Francisco Suárez in Granada

Here, Suárez's main importance stems probably from his work on natural law, and from his arguments concerning positive law and the status of a monarch. In his massive work, Tractatus de legibus ac deo legislatore (1612), he is to some extent the precursor of Grotius and Pufendorf, in making an important distinction between natural law and international law, which he saw as based on custom. Though his method is throughout scholastic, he covers the same ground, and Grotius speaks of him with great respect. The fundamental position of the work is that all legislative as well as all paternal power is derived from God, and that the authority of every law stems ultimately from God's eternal law. Suárez denies the patriarchal theory of government and the divine right of kings founded upon it, doctrines popular at that time in England and to some extent on the Continent. He argued against the sort of social contract theory that became dominant among early-modern political philosophers such as Thomas Hobbes and John Locke, but some of his thinking, as transmitted by Grotius, found echoes in later liberal political theory.

He argued that human beings have a social nature bestowed upon them by God, and this includes the potential to make laws. However, when a political society is formed, the authority of the state is not of divine but of human origin; therefore, its nature is chosen by the people involved, and their natural legislative power is given to the ruler. Because they gave this power, they have the right to take it back and to revolt against a ruler, only if the ruler behaves badly towards them, and they must act moderately and justly. In particular, the people must refrain from killing the ruler, no matter how tyrannical he may have become. If a government is imposed on people, on the other hand, they have the right to defend themselves by revolting against it and even kill the tyrannical ruler.

Though Suárez was greatly influenced by Aquinas in his philosophy of law, there are some notable differences. Aquinas broadly defined "law" as "a rule and measure acts, whereby man is induced to act or is restrained from acting" (ST 1–11, qu. 90, art. 1). Suárez argues that this definition is too broad, since it applies to things that are not strictly laws, such as unjust ordinances and counsels of perfection. Suárez also takes issue with Aquinas' more formal definition of "law" as "an ordinance of reason for the common good, made by him who has care of the community, and promulgated" (ST 1–11, qu. 90, art. 4). This definition, he claims, fails to recognize that law is primarily an act of will rather than an act of reason, and would wrongly count orders to particular individuals as being laws. Finally, Suárez disagrees with Aquinas's claim that God can change or suspend some of the secondary precepts of the natural law, such as the prohibitions on murder, theft, and adultery (ST 1–11, qu. 94, art. 5). Suárez argues that the natural law is immutable as long as human nature remains unchanged, and that what may appear to be divinely-made changes in the natural law are really just alterations of subject matter. For example, when God orders Hosea to take a "wife of fornications" (i.e., have sex with a prostitute), this is not an exemption from God's prohibition of adultery. "For God has power to transfer to a man dominium over a woman without her consent, and to effect such a bond between them that, by virtue of this bond, the union is no longer one of fornication."

In 1613, at the instigation of Pope Paul V, Suárez wrote a treatise dedicated to the Christian princes of Europe, entitled Defensio catholicae fidei contra anglicanae sectae errores ("Defense of the Universal Catholic Faith Against the Errors of the Anglican Sect"). This was directed against the oath of allegiance which James I required from his subjects.

James (himself a talented scholar) caused it to be burned by the common hangman and forbade its perusal under the 'severest penalties, complaining bitterly to Philip III of Spain for harbouring in his dominions a declared enemy of the throne and majesty of kings.

== Influence ==
The contributions of Suarez to metaphysics and theology exerted significant influence over 17th and 18th century scholastic theology among both Roman Catholics and Protestants.

Thanks in part to the strength of Suárez's Jesuit order, his Disputationes Metaphysicae was widely taught in the Catholic schools of Spain, Portugal and Italy.

It also spread from these schools to many Lutheran universities in Germany, where the text was studied especially by those who favoured Melanchthon rather than Luther's attitude towards philosophy. In a number of seventeenth-century Lutheran universities the Disputationes served as a textbook in philosophy.

In a similar way, Suárez had major influence in the Reformed tradition of German and Dutch schools for both metaphysics and law, including international law. His work was highly praised, for example, by Hugo Grotius (1583–1645).

His influence is evident in the writings of Bartholomaeus Keckermann (1571–1609), Clemens Timpler (1563–1624), Gilbertus Jacchaeus (1578–1628), Johann Heinrich Alsted (1588–1638), Antonius Walaeus (1573–1639), and Johannes Maccovius (Jan Makowski; 1588–1644), among others. This influence was so pervasive that by 1643 it provoked the Dutch Reformed theologian Jacobus Revius to publish his book-length response: Suarez repurgatus. Suárez's De legibus was cited as among the best books on law by the Puritan Richard Baxter, and Baxter's friend Matthew Hale drew on it for his natural-law theory.

The views of Suarez upon the human origin of political order, and his defense of tyrannicide emanating from popular dissent were heavily criticized by English philosopher Robert Filmer in his work Patriarcha, Or the Natural Power of Kings. Filmer believed Calvinists and Catholics like Suarez to be dangerous opponents of divine right monarchy, legitimized by the supremacy of fathers upon their offspring, which Filmer claimed could be traced back to Adam.

== Main works ==
- De Incarnatione (1590–1592)
- De sacramentis (1593–1603)
- Disputationes metaphysicae (1597)
- De divina substantia eiusque attributis (1606)
- De divina praedestinatione et reprobatione (1606)
- De sanctissimo Trinitatis mysterio (1606)
- De religione (1608–1625)
- De legibus (1612)
- Defensio fidei (1613)
- De gratia (1619)
- De angelis (1620)
- De opere sex dierum (1621)
- De anima (1621)
- De fide, spe et caritate (1622)
- De ultimo fine hominis (1628)

In the 18th century, the Venice edition of Opera Omnia in 23 volumes in folio (1740–1751) appeared, followed by the Parisian Vivès edition, 26 volumes + 2 volumes of indices (1856–1861); in 1965 the Vivés edition of the Disputationes Metaphysicae (vols. 25–26) was reprinted by Georg Olms, Hildesheim.

From 1597 to 1636 the Disputationes Metaphysicae were published in seventeen editions; no modern edition of Suárez's complete works is yet available and only few of Suárez's Disputations have been translated into English.

== See also ==
- Giovanni Botero
- Juan Caramuel y Lobkowitz
- Jurisprudence
- Alphonsus Liguori
- Juan de Mariana
- Political philosophy
- School of Salamanca
- Rule according to higher law
