= Objective precision =

"objective" aspect of abstraction

In philosophy and second scholasticism, objective precision (Latin: praecisio obiectiva) is the "objective" aspect of abstraction. Objective precision is the process by which certain features (the differentiae) of the real object of a formal concept are excluded from the comprehension of that concept; the object is thus being intentionally transformed into a universal objective concept. Objective precision is thus a process by which universal objective concepts arise. It is the "objective" aspect of the process of (total) abstraction or concept-formation.

== Objective precision and formal precision ==
Objective precision is distinguished against formal precision. Whereas objective precision is a process on the part of objective concepts (the objective correlates of the mental acts by means of which something is being conceived) formal precision is the corresponding process on the part of formal concepts or the mental acts themselves. Objective and formal precision are the two aspects (objective and subjective) of abstraction.

== Nominalism and realism ==
The two opposing philosophical views on universals, nominalism (or rather conceptualism) and realism can be defined by means of their relation to objective precision: anyone who accepts objective precision, is a philosophical realist; anyone who rejects it, is a conceptualist or nominalist (in a broad sense). In other words, the nominalists reject the idea that our universal mental concepts (formal concepts) require universal intentional objects; thus, according to nominalists, in abstraction only formal precision takes place, no objective precision.

== Ontological requirements on the part of the object ==
The schools are divided in their opinion what constitutes the necessary condition on the part of the object in order that objective precision be possible. According to the Thomists a virtual distinction on the part of the object between the excluded differentia and the arising abstracted objective concept is sufficient to make objective precision possible. According to the Scotists, a formal distinction is generally required, although certain Scotists (like Bartolomeo Mastri) regard virtual distinction as sufficient in certain special cases. Suárez defends objective precision but he rejects any distinctions on the part of the object. The nominalists (conceptualists) agree with the Scotists that a formal distinction would be necessary to enable objective precision, but since they regard such a distinction as impossible, they reject objective precision altogether.

== See also ==
- Abstract object theory

== Sources ==
- Daniel Heider, Andersen Claus A. (eds.), Cognitive Issues in the Long Scotist Tradition, Schwabe Verlag, 2023.
