= Inés de Benigánim =

Spanish beatified nun (1625–1696)

Blessed Inés de Benigánim OAD
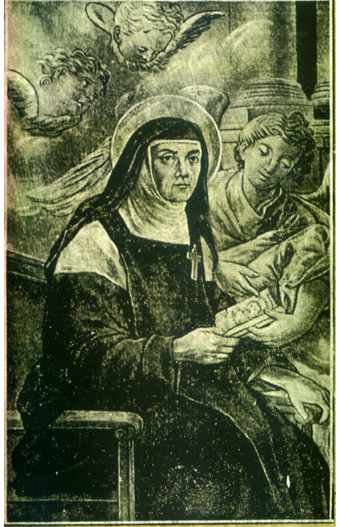
- 18th-century image
- Born: Josefa Teresa Albiñana Gomar; 9 February 1625; Benigànim, Valencia, Spain
- Died: 21 January 1696 (aged 70); Benigánim, Valencia, Habsburg Spain
- Venerated in: Catholic Church
- Beatified: 26 February 1888, Saint Peter's Basilica, Kingdom of Italy by Pope Leo XIII
- Feast: 21 January; 23 January (Augustinian Order)

Inés de Benigánim, religious name Josefa María of Saint Agnes, (9 February 1625 – 21 January 1696) - born as Josefa Teresa Albiñana Gomar - was a Spanish nun of the Discalced Augustinians. She became known for her profound spiritual and theological insight as well as for her severe austerities she practiced during her life. Her beatification was celebrated in 1888 in Saint Peter's Basilica.

== Life ==
Josefa Teresa Albiñana Gomar was born in Spain in 1625 to poor parents, Lluís Albiñana and his wife Vicenta Gomar. Her father died when she was a child. Following the death of her father, the family was aided by the town mayor, her uncle Bartomeu Tudela. As a child she suffered from epilepsy.

At the age of 13 or 14, having gone to the river to wash clothes, she reported having a vision of Jesus Christ who called her to embrace him and seek the religious life. This prompted her to refuse an offer of marriage, which so enraged her suitor that he killed himself.

She entered the Discalced Augustinian convent in her hometown on 25 October 1643 and assumed the religious name Josefa María of Saint Agnes upon vesting in the habit on 26 June 1644; she made her solemn vows on 27 August 1645. She began to practise severe austerities that characterised her life and her time amongst her fellow religious. She also became known for prophetic gifts, which prompted people to consult her for her spiritual insights. She had minimal formal education but instead received great understanding of theological topics. She could neither read nor follow the Liturgy of the Hours which was held in Latin.

Gomar died in 1696 on the feast of Saint Agnes, after having received the sacraments for the last time. Her remains are incorrupt and in the Spanish Civil War her tomb was desecrated though later restored.

== Beatification ==
The beatification process commenced in an informative process that opened in 1729 and concluded sometime after having collected her writings and available witness interrogatories. Theologians met to discuss her theological writings and approved them as orthodox on 21 May 1760. An apostolic process was also held as a means of continuing the work of the previous process while the two were validated in Rome on 26 January 1803.

The formal introduction to the cause came on 16 September 1769 under Pope Clement XIV when she was proclaimed a Servant of God - the first official stage in the process of sanctification. She was proclaimed to be Venerable on 19 August 1838 after Pope Gregory XVI recognized her life of heroic virtue.

Two informative processes were held to investigate two miracles required for her beatification and received the validation of the Congregation of Rites following its conclusion. Two separate meetings saw approval of the miracle on 7 March 1884 and 13 January 1885, while officials made the final decision in favor of the miracles on 21 July 1885.

Pope Leo XIII approved the two miracles on 21 February 1886 and beatified her in Saint Peter's Basilica on 26 February 1888.
