= Claude Fleury =

French priest, jurist and ecclesiastical historian

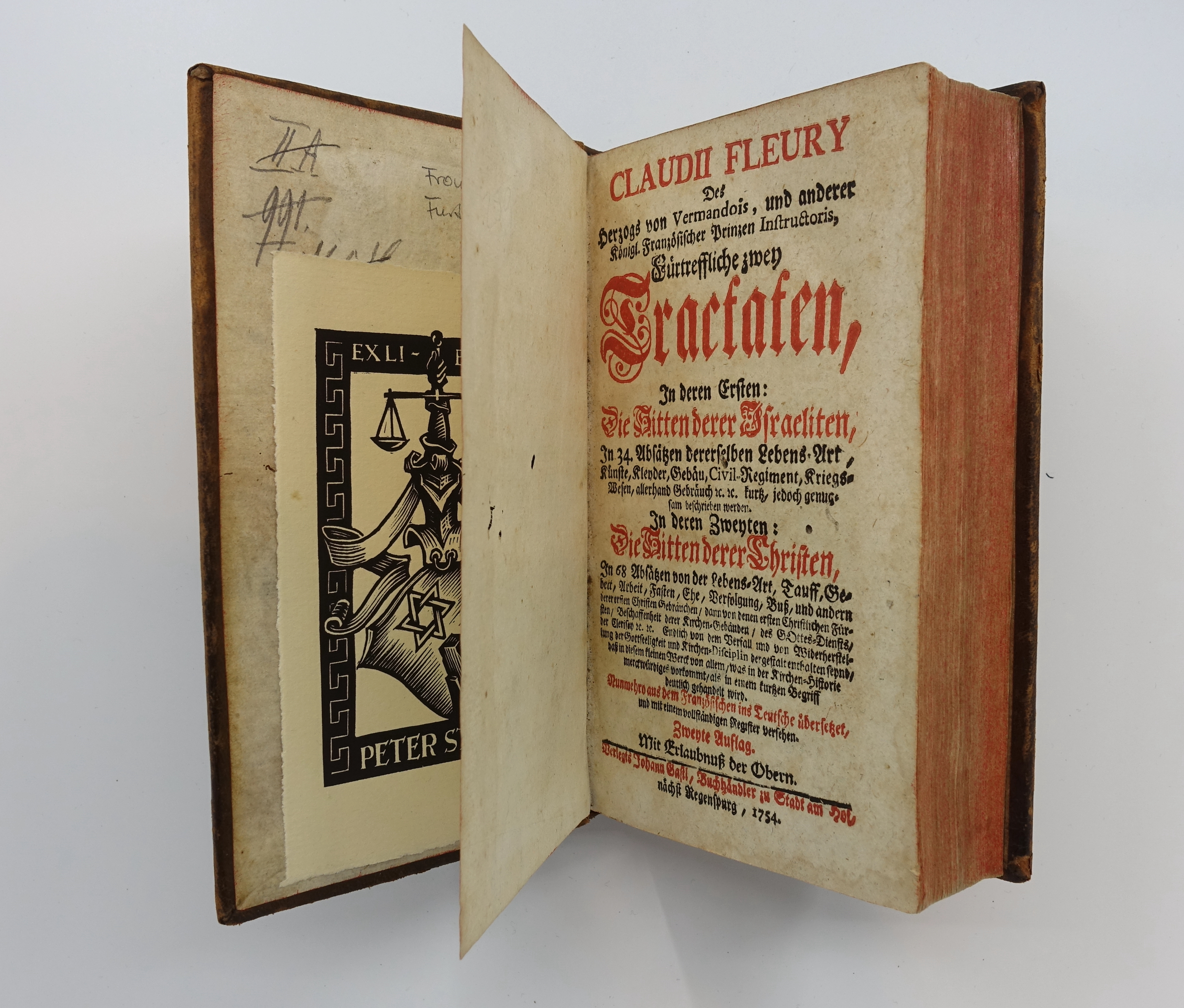
1754 German translation of Claude Fleury's Mœurs des Israelites (customs of the Israelites), in the collection of the Jewish Museum of Switzerland.

Claude Fleury (6 December 1640, Paris – 14 July 1723, Paris), was a French priest, jurist, and ecclesiastical historian.

Destined for the bar, he was educated at the elite, Jesuit College de Clermont (now that of Louis-le-Grand) in Paris. In 1658 he was accepted as an attorney to the parlement of Paris, and for nine years practiced law. There he caught the attention of preacher at the royal court, Bishop Jacques-Bénigne Bossuet, who persuaded him to study theology and receive holy orders. Under Bossuet's patronage, he attracted the attention of the king, Louis XIV, who appointed him the tutor of the princes of Conti in 1672 and soon thereafter of the count of Vermandois, one of the king's bastards. For his service Fleury was awarded the Cistercian abbey of Loc-Dieu, in the diocese of Rodez.

Fleury's aristocratic teaching duties expanded in 1689 when he was appointed sub-preceptor of the dukes of Burgundy, of Anjou, and of Berry. He thus curried favor with Fénelon, their chief tutor. In 1696 he was elected to fill the place of La Bruyère in the Académie française; and on the completion of the education of the young princes the king reassigned to him the priory of Argenteuil, in the diocese of Paris (1706), a more lucrative benefice than Loc-Dieu.

About this time he began his great work, the first of the kind in France, and one for which he had been collecting materials for thirty years—the Histoire ecclésiastique. Fleury's evident intention was to write a history of the church for all classes of society; but at the time in which his great work appeared it was less religion than theology that absorbed the attention of the clergy and the educated public; and his work accordingly appealed to the student rather than to the popular reader, dwelling as it does very particularly on questions of doctrine, of discipline, of supremacy, and of rivalry between the priesthood and the imperial power.

Nevertheless, it had a great success. The first edition, printed at Paris in 20 volumes (4to), 1691, was followed by many others, among which may be mentioned that of Brussels, in 32 vols (8vo), 1692, and that of Nîmes, in 25 vols (8vo), 1778 to 1780. The work of Fleury only comes down to the year 1414. It was continued by Jean Claude Fabre and Goujet down to 1595, in 16 vols. (4to). In consulting the work of Fleury and its supplement, the general table of contents, published by Rondet, Paris, 1758, 1 vol. (4to) will be found very useful. Translations have been made of the entire work into Latin, German and Italian. The Latin translation, published at Augsburg, 1758–1759, 85 vols. (8vo), carries the work down to 1684.

Fleury was appointed confessor to the young King Louis XV in 1716, because, as the duke of Orleans said, he was neither Jansenist nor Molinist, nor Ultramontanist, but Catholic. His great learning was equaled by the modest simplicity of his life and the uprightness of his conduct.

Fleury left many works besides his Histoire ecclésiastique. The following deserve special mention:

- Histoire du droit français (1674, 12mo)
- Mœurs des Israelites (1681, 12mo)
- Mœurs des Chrétiens (1682, 12mo)
- Catechisme Historique, contenant en abregé l'histoire sainte et la doctrine Cretienne (1683, 2vo)
- Traité du choix et de la méthode des études (1686, 2 vols 12mo)
- Les Devoirs des maîtres et des domestiques (1688, 12mo)

A number of the smaller works were published in one volume at Paris in 1807. The Roman Congregation of the Index condemned his Catéchisme historique (1679) and the Institution du droit ecclésiastique (1687).

See C Ernst Simonetti, Der Character eines Geschichtsschreibers in dem Leben und aus den Schriften des Abbé C. Fleury (Göttingen 1746, 4to); CFP Jaeger, Notice sur C. Fleury, considéré comme historien de l'eglise (Strassburg, 1847, 8vo); Reichlin-Meldegg, Geschichte des Christentums, I.
