= Stefano da San Gregorio =

Italian Augustinian friar and mathematician

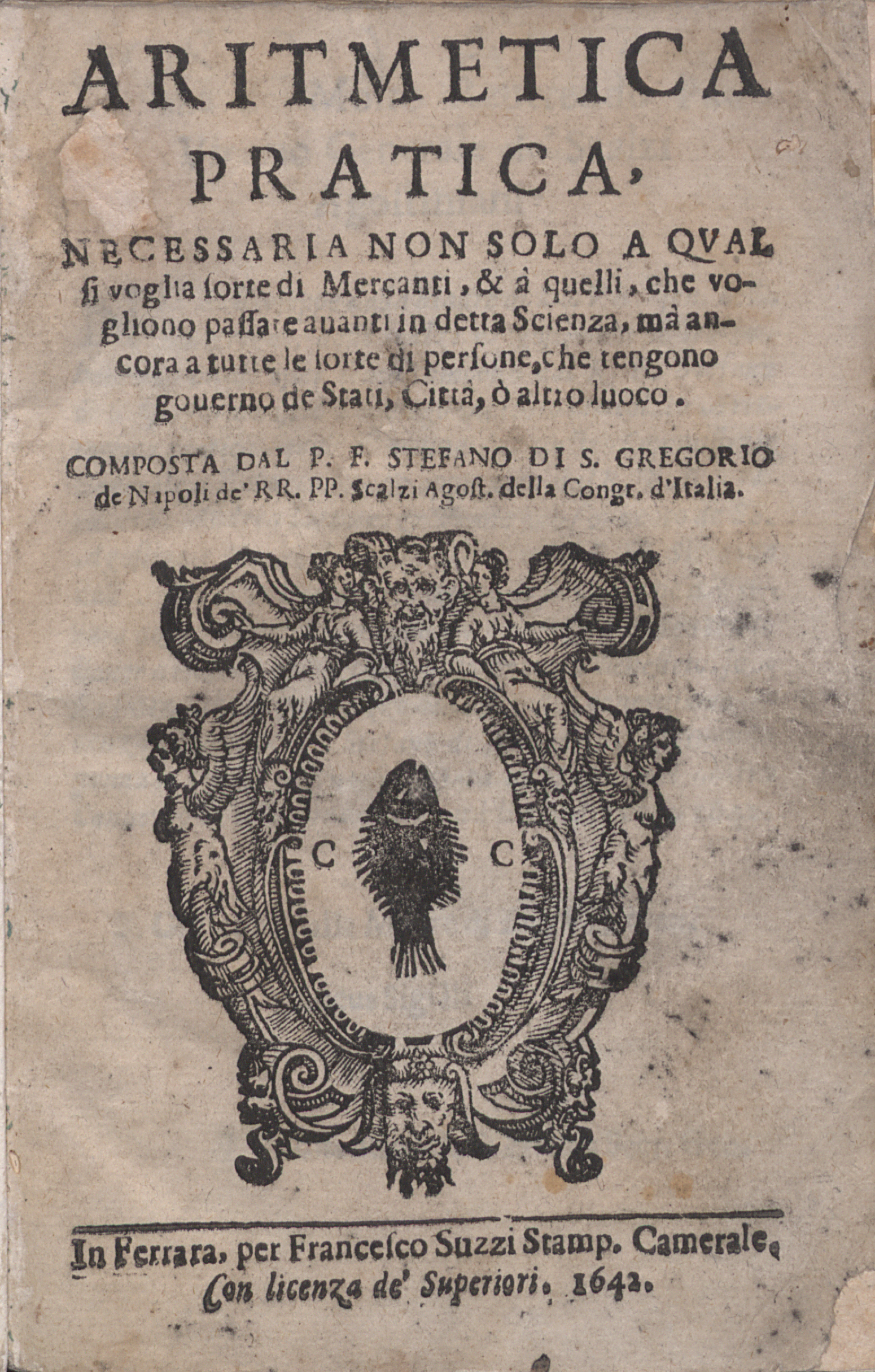
Aritmetica pratica, title page

Stefano da San Gregorio was a 17th-century Italian mathematician and theologian from the Order of Discalced Augustinians.

== Works ==
- Aritmetica pratica (in Italian). Ferrara: Francesco Suzzi. 1642.
- De praecipuis iuris et iustitiae partibus (in Latin). Ferrara: Franciscum Succium. 1643.
- De divinae pietatis vinculis (in Latin). Milano: Francisci Vigoni. 1668.
