= Louis Moréri =

French priest and scholar

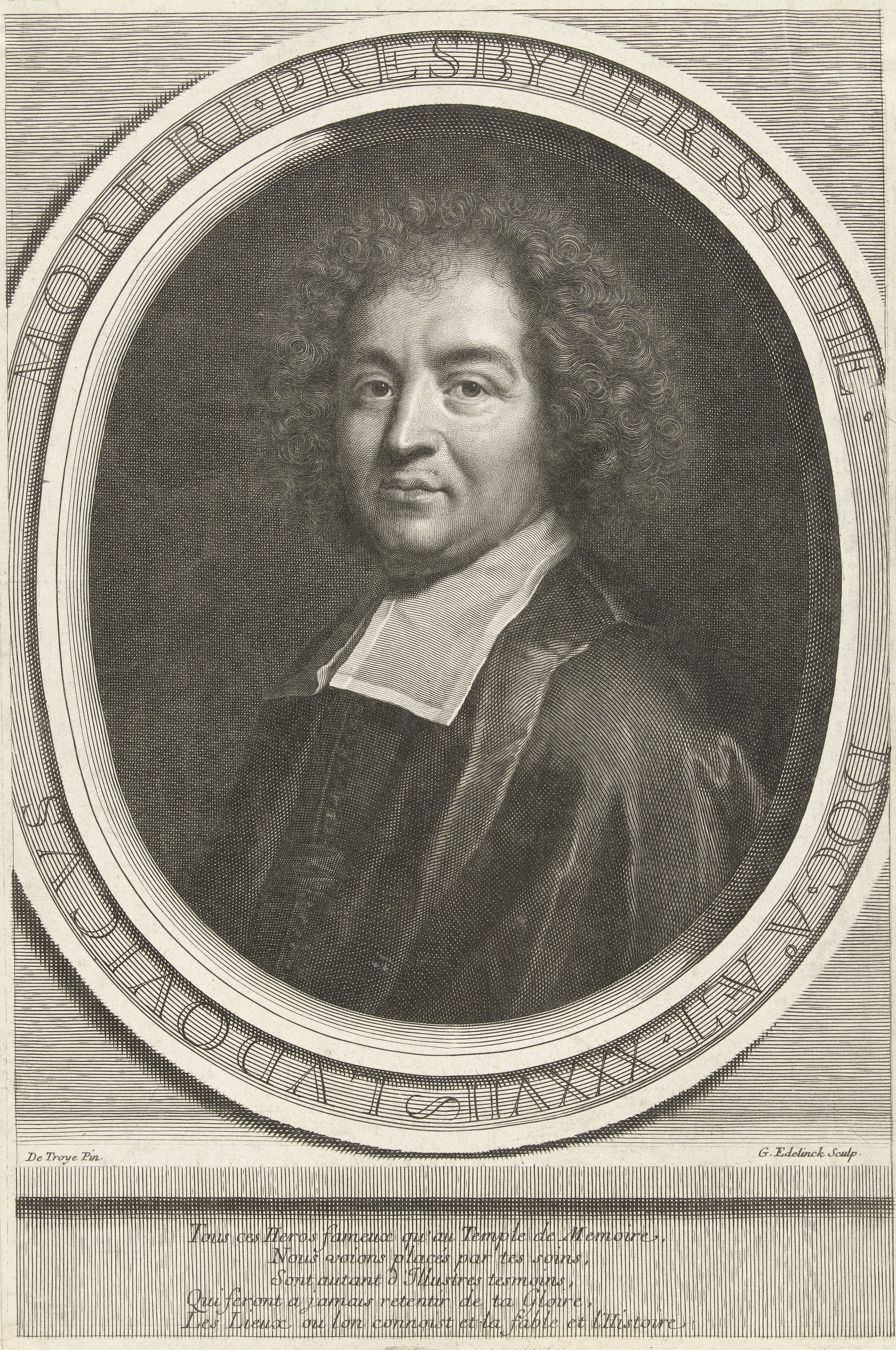
- Louis Moréri, frontispiece, etching by Gerard Edelinck after a drawing by De Troyes, 17th century
- Born: 25 March 1643; Bargemon, France
- Died: 10 July 1680 (aged 37); Paris, France

Louis Moréri (25 March 1643 – 10 July 1680) was a French priest and encyclopedist. Moreri was the author of Le Grand Dictionaire historique, ou le mélange curieux de l'histoire sacrée et profane (literally, The Great Historical Dictionary or Curious Anthology of Sacred and Secular History). At least 24 editions of the encyclopedia were published between 1674 and 1759 and the encyclopedia was translated into a number of languages, including English, German, Dutch and Spanish.

== Life ==
Moréri was born in 1643 in Bargemon, a village in the French ancient province of Provence. His great-grandfather, Joseph Chatranet, a native of Dijon, had settled in Provence under King Charles IX of France and taken the name of the village of Moréri, which he acquired through marriage.

Louis Moréri studied humanities in Draguignan and later rhetoric and philosophy at the Jesuit College of Aix-en-Provence. He then studied theology, obtaining his doctoral degree, and was ordained a priest in Lyon. During his stay in Lyon, he published several works, among them La pratique de la perfection chrétienne et religieuse (1667), a translation of the work of the Spanish Jesuit theologian, Alonso Rodriguez. It was probably in Lyon that he met Samuel Chappuzeau, who claimed to have first given him the idea of writing his encyclopedia.

In 1675, shortly after publishing the first edition of his encyclopedia, Moréri accompanied his bishop to Paris, where he became acquainted with Simon Arnauld, Marquis de Pomponne, then the minister of foreign affairs. Three years later, he was hired to be a tutor for Pomponne's children. During this time, he worked on a second edition of his encyclopedia. In 1680, midway through the printing of the second edition, he died of tuberculosis.

== Legacy ==
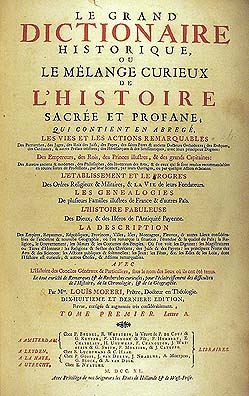
Le grand dictionaire historique

Moréri's encyclopedia, Le Grand Dictionaire historique, ou le mélange curieux de l'histoire sacrée et profane (literally, The Great Historical Dictionary, or Curious Anthology of Sacred and Secular History, although it was translated differently into English at the time) was first published in Lyon in 1674. The encyclopedia focused almost exclusively on historical and biographical articles. Moréri dedicated it to Gaillard de Longjumeau, the Bishop of Apt, to whom he had been appointed chaplain. Moréri's one-volume edition of 1674 and posthumous two-volume edition of 1681 were revised and expanded by others after his death. At least twenty-four editions were published between 1674 (one volume) and 1759 (ten volumes). The encyclopedia was also translated and adapted into English, German, Dutch and Spanish.

Moréri's Grand Dictionaire historique gave rise to a more famous encyclopedia, Pierre Bayle's The Historical and Critical Dictionary (1697). Bayle conceived his work as correcting and making up for deficiencies of Moréri's work.

== See also ==
- List of Roman Catholic scientist-clerics
- Digital Dictionnaire de Moréri at the ARTFL Project
