= Claude-Pierre Goujet =

French abbé and littérateur

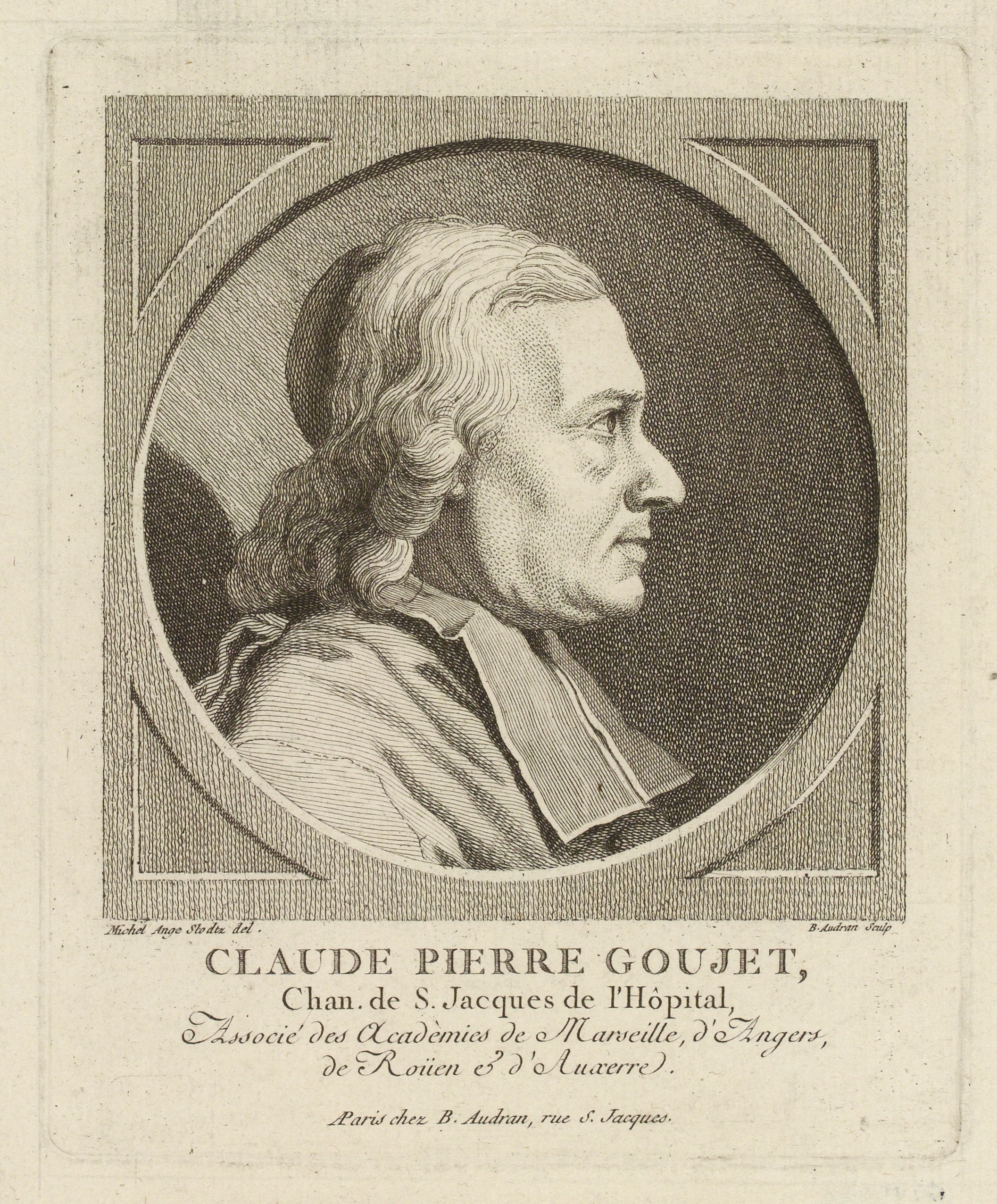
Portrait of Claude Pierre Goujet

Claude-Pierre Goujet (19 October 1697 – 1 February 1767), French abbé and littérateur, was born in Paris.

He studied at the College of the Jesuits, and at the Collège Mazarin, but he nevertheless became a strong Jansenist. In 1705 he assumed the ecclesiastical habit, in 1719 entered the order of Oratorians, and soon afterwards was named canon of St Jacques l'Hôpital. On account of his extreme Jansenist opinions he suffered considerable persecution from the Jesuits, and several of his works were suppressed at their instigation. In his latter years his health began to fail, and he lost his eyesight. Poverty compelled him to sell his library, a sacrifice which hastened his death, which took place at Paris on 1 February 1767.

He is the author of Supplement au Grand dictionaire historique genealogique, geographique, &c. de M. Louis Moreri (1735), and a Nouveau Supplement to a subsequent edition of the work; he collaborated in Bibliothèque française, ou histoire littéraire de la France (18 vols, Paris, 1740–1759); and in the Vies des saints (7 vols, 1730); he also wrote Mémoires historiques et littéraires sur le collège royal de France (1758); Histoire des Inquisitions (Paris, 1752); and supervised an edition of César-Pierre Richelet's Dictionnaire, of which he has also given an abridgment. He helped Jean Claude Fabre to complete Fleury's Histoire ecclésiastique.

See Mémoires hist. et litt. de l'abbé Goujet (1767).
