= Bibliothèque municipale de Lyon =

Library in Lyon, France

Lyon Part-Dieu Municipal Library
- Bibliothèque Municipale de Lyon Part-Dieu
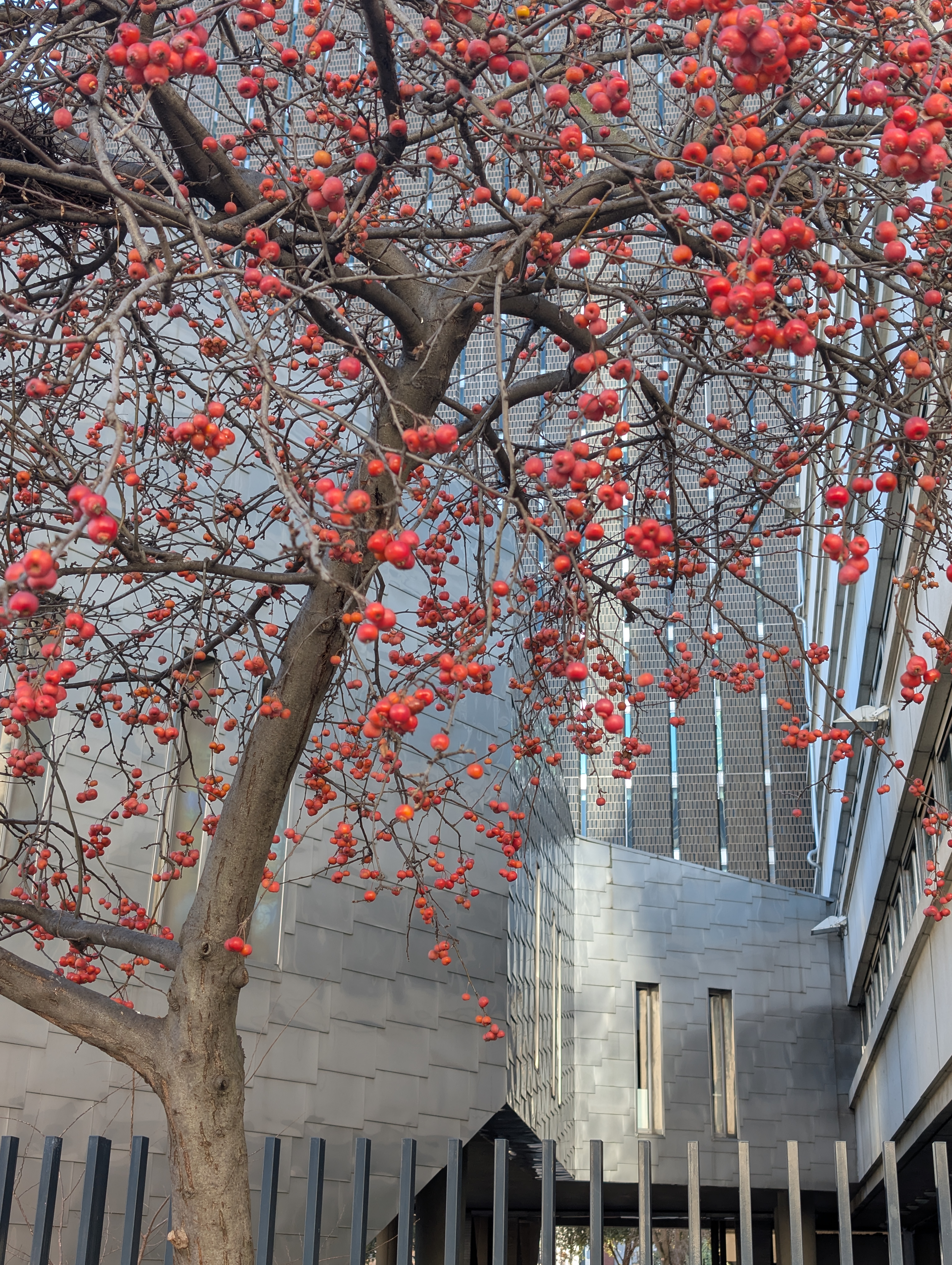
- The eastern entry (2007) and reserves (1972) of the library
- 45.76168161717051°N 4.860658920033354°E
- Location: Lyon, France

Other information
- Website: http://www.bm-lyon.fr/

The Bibliothèque municipale de Lyon is a historically significant library in Lyon, France. In addition to providing standard library services it also hosts a variety of special collections, in particular in the fields of photography, Lyon and the Rhône-Alpes département, old books, textiles, music, contemporary art and literature.

It holds one of the largest collection in Europe with more than 3.2 million items, including 1,5 million books, 203,500 old master prints and 670,000 photographs

== See also ==
- List of libraries in France
