= Dictionnaire Historique et Critique =

Biographical dictionary by Pierre Bayle

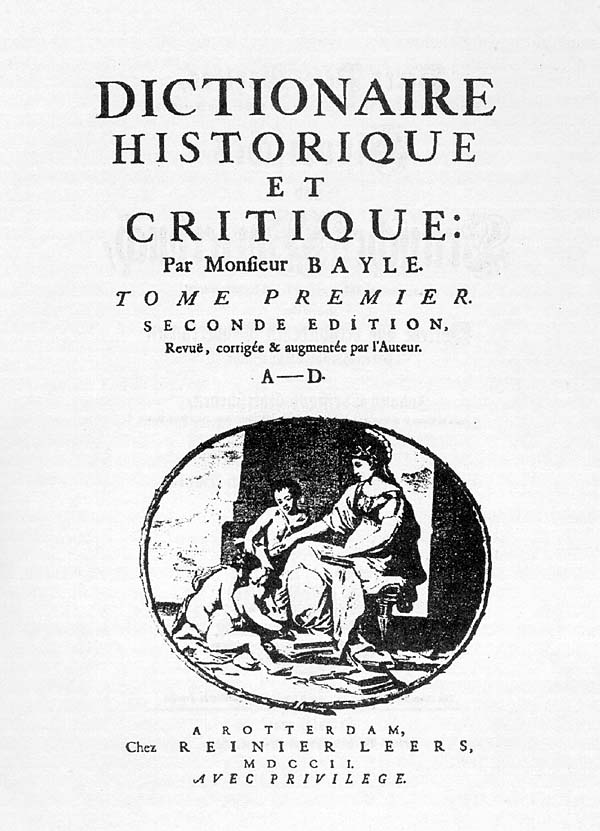

The Dictionnaire Historique et Critique (French pronunciation: [diksjɔnɛːʁ istɔʁik e kʁitik]; English: Historical and Critical Dictionary) was a French biographical dictionary written by Pierre Bayle (1647–1706), a Huguenot philosopher who lived and published in Rotterdam, in the Republic of the Seven United Netherlands, after fleeing his native France due to religious persecution. In 1689, Bayle began making notes on errors and omissions in Louis Moreri's Grand Dictionaire historique (1674), a previous encyclopedia, and these notes ultimately developed into his own Dictionnaire.

Bayle used the dictionary to provide evidence of the irrationality of Christianity, to promote his views about religious tolerance, and his anti-authoritarian views on the topic of faith. The dictionary influenced the thinkers of the Age of Enlightenment, in particular Denis Diderot and the other Encyclopédistes.

== Publication history ==
The first edition of Bayle's dictionary, published in 1697, comprised two volumes, each with two parts, so that it appeared as four physical books (A–B, C–G, H–O, and P–Z). In the second edition of 1702, it was enlarged to three volumes (A–D, E–M, and N–Z). An English translation was first published in 1709.

== Biographical topics and additional material ==
The overwhelming majority of the entries were devoted to individual people, whether historical or mythical, but some articles treated religious beliefs and philosophies. Many of the more controversial ideas in the book were hidden away in the voluminous footnotes, or they were slipped into articles on seemingly uncontroversial topics.

== Influence on the Age of Enlightenment ==
The rigor and skeptical approach demonstrated in the Dictionary influenced many thinkers of the Enlightenment, including Denis Diderot and the other Encyclopédistes, David Hume, and George Berkeley. Bayle delighted in pointing out contradictions between theological tenets and the supposedly self-evident dictates of reason. He used the evidence of the irrationality of Christianity to emphasize that the basis of Christianity is faith in God and divine revelation. But at the same time he sought to promote religious tolerance, and argued strongly against inflexible and authoritarian application of religious articles of faith. This led to a bitter argument with his fellow French Protestant Pierre Jurieu.
