= Thomas of Jesus =

Discalced Augustinian and preacher (1529–1582)

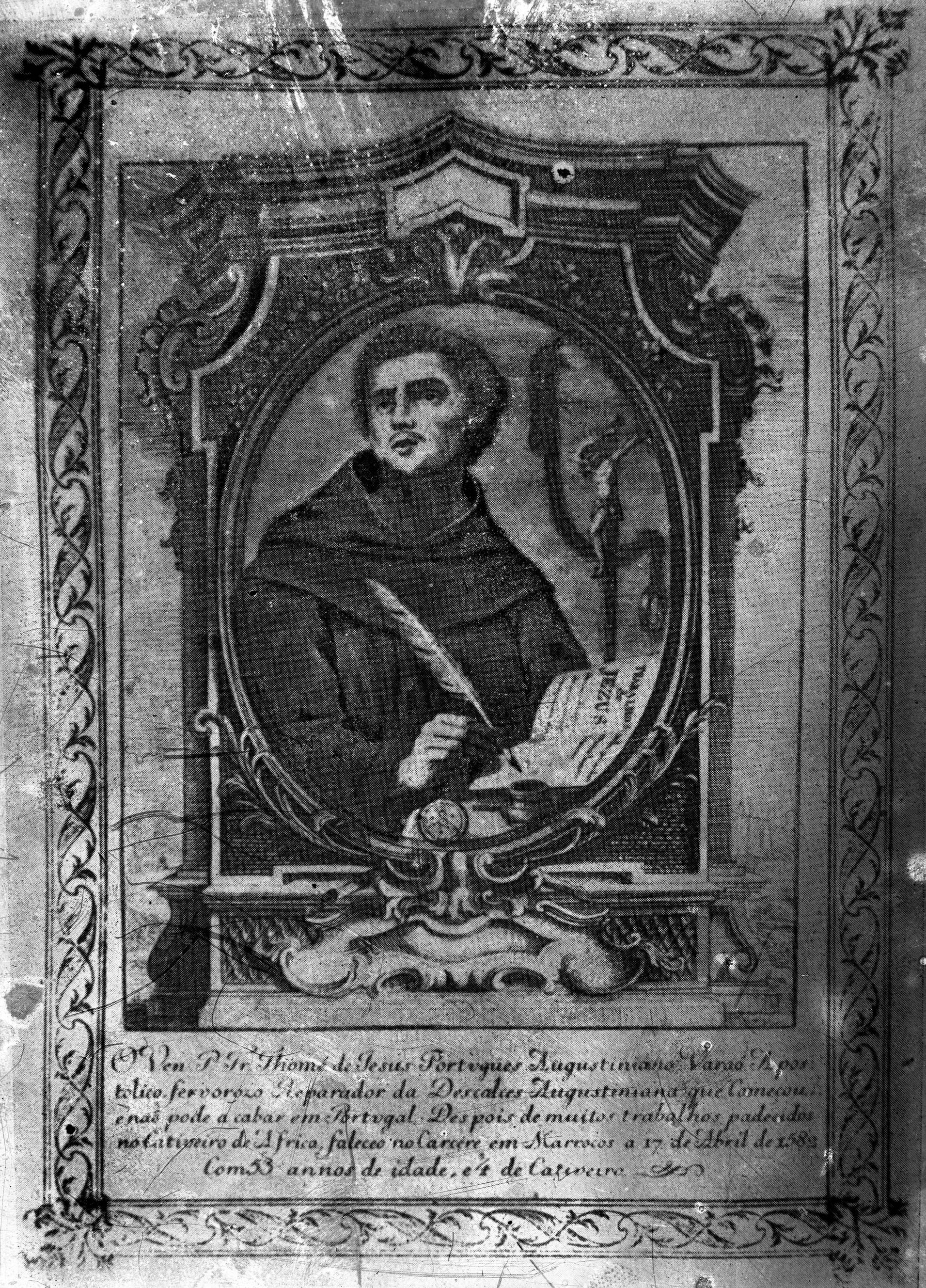
Engraved portrait of Fr. Thomas of Jesus, pictured writing his Os Trabalhos de Jesus

Thomas of Jesus OAD, (Lisbon, 1529 – Morocco, April 17, 1582), also known as Tome de Jesus and Tomé de Andrade, was a reformer and preacher, instrumental in creating the Discalced Augustinians.

== Life ==
Thomas of Andrada was born in Lisbon in 1529, and "belonged to one of the most illustrious house of Portugal". Thomas joined the Order of Saint Augustine at the age of fifteen and took the religious name Thomas of Jesus.

His attempts to reform the order met with little success as his zeal for a stricter observance only raised violent opposition and hardship for himself, and he was forced to desist. Nonetheless, after his death the regulations he had proposed were later adopted by those Augustinians who formed the discalced branch.

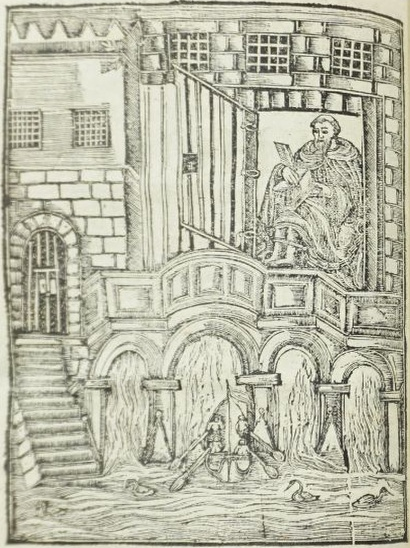
Engraving published in 1733 depicting Thomas of Jesus in captivity in Morocco

He was a chaplain with Sebastian of Portugal's campaign against Morocco in 1578. According to Henry Edward Manning, Thomas was mixing with the nobles and soldiery with the mission "to nurse the sick and tend the wounded", and to prevent imprisoned Christian slaves from the mortal sin of apostasy." Father Thomas was wounded, captured, and imprisoned for four years. His sister, the Countess of Linares, managed to raise his ransom, but Thomas requested that it be used to buy the freedom of two others, so that he could remain and minister to his fellow captives. He became ill and died on 17 April 1582 not long after their release.

== Works ==
His main work, Os Trabalhos de Jesus, is a mystical text consisting of contemplations on the sufferings of Jesus. He wrote it while a captive in Morocco. The book was published between 1602 and 1609, and was translated into several languages, including Latin, Spanish, English, and German.

Thomas of Jesus wrote the Latin treatise De contemplatione divina libri VI ("Six books on the divine contemplation"), firstly published at Cologne in 1684.
