= Alonso Rodriguez =

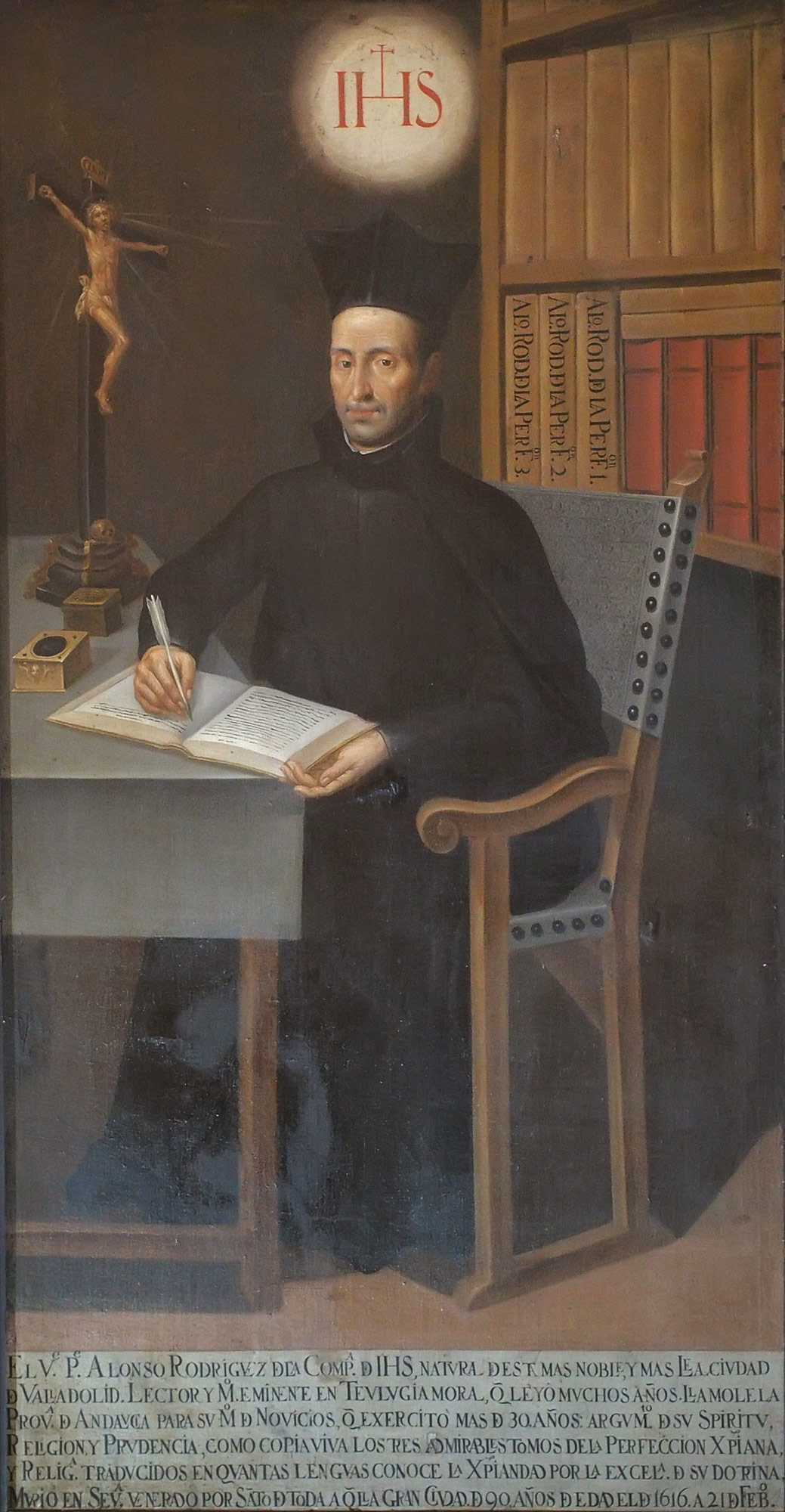
Alonso Rodriguez

Alonso Rodriguez (1538 in Valladolid – 21 February 1616, Seville) was a Spanish Jesuit priest and spiritual writer. His writings, a single book, underline much the ascetical dimension of religious life.

== Life ==
When twenty years of age, Rodriguez entered the Society of Jesus. After completing his studies taught moral theology for twelve years at the College of Monterey, and subsequently filled the posts of master of novices for twelve more years, of rector for seventeen years, and of spiritual guide at Cordova for eleven years. As master of novices he had under his charge Francisco Suárez, the celebrated theologian.

Alonso's characteristics in these offices were care, diligence, and charity. He was a religious of great piety and candour, hating all pride and ostentation. It was said of him by those who were personally acquainted with him, that his character and virtues were accurately depicted in Ejercicio de perfección y virtudes cristianas, published at Seville, 1609.

== The Ejercicio de perfección y virtudes cristianas ==
This work is based on the material which Rodriguez collected for his spiritual exhortations to his brethren, and published at the request of his superiors. Although the book thus written was primarily intended for the use of his religious brethren, yet he destined it also for the profit and edification of other religious and of laypersons in the world. Of set purpose it avoids the loftier flights of mysticism and all abstruse speculation. It is a book of practical instructions on all the virtues which perfect the Christian life, whether lived in the cloister or in the world. It became popular at once, and remained in use till the era of Vatican II by all classes of Christians, particularly by those who had entered religious life. More than twenty-five editions of the original Spanish have been issued, besides extracts and abridgements.

More than sixty editions have appeared in French in seven different translations, twenty in Italian, at least ten in German, and eight in Latin. An English translation from the French by Antony Hoskins was printed at St. Omer in 1612.

The best known English translation, under the title Practice of Christian Perfection, often reprinted, is that which first appeared in London, 1697, from the French text of François-Séraphin Régnier-Desmarais. P.O. Shea issued in New York an edition adapted for general use in 1878. The book has been translated into nearly all the European languages and into many of those of the East. No other work of the author was published.
