= Discalced Augustinians =

Religious congregation founded as a reform of the Order of St. Augustine

Order of Discalced Augustinians
- Ordo Augustiniensium Discalceatorum
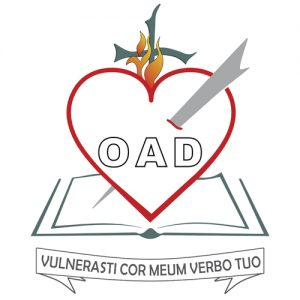
- Abbreviation: OAD
- Formation: 1592; 434 years ago
- Founded at: Naples, Italy
- Type: Mendicant Order of Pontifical Right (for Men)
- Headquarters: Santa Maria della Consolazione, Piazza Ottavilla, 1; 00152 Rome
- Members: 221 (144 priests) as of 2018
- Motto: Latin: Vulnerasti cor meum verbo tuo (English: 'Your word has pierced my heart')
- Prior General: Nei Marcio Simon, OAD
- Vicar General: Renan William Ilustrisimo, OAD
- Website: oadnet.org

The Order of Discalced Augustinians (Latin: Ordo Augustiniensium Discalceatorum; abbreviation: OAD) is a mendicant order that branched off from the Order of Saint Augustine as a reform movement.

== History ==
During the Counter-Reformation, there was a special interest among the Augustinian friars in the theological debates of the day, as well as a need to return to the roots of their way of life.

In an effort to seek a more simple and spiritual life, various friars banded together and followed a pattern seen in other mendicant orders, in which simplicity of dress and a stricter form of a life of prayer and penance were embraced. The Discalced Augustinians were formed in 1610 in Italy as a reform movement of the Order and have their own constitutions, differing from those of the other Augustinians.

Among the Augustinians, there also was an effort to return to the eremitical origins of their Order. Their fasts are more rigorous and their other ascetic practices stricter. As with the Carmelite reform of the same period, these friars came to be known by their practice of wearing sandals, as opposed to shoes (thus the term discalced or barefoot), in an effort to live more like the poor.

This reform was approved by the 100th General Chapter of the Augustinian friars, which was held during May 1592 at the Monastery of St. Augustine in Rome, the General motherhouse of the Order of St. Augustine. The new branch which thus developed was approved by the Vatican as a separate Order in 1610. Discalced Augustinians take a special fourth vow of humility.

As of 2026, there were about 220 friars, of which 144 were priests, in 38 houses located in Italy, Brazil, Cameroon, India, Indonesia, the Philippines and Vietnam. Prior to World War II, there had been a German Province, which included Bohemia.

== Nuns ==
Towards the end of the 16th century communities of female Discalced Augustinians appeared in Spain. The first convent, that of the Visitation, was founded at Madrid, in 1589, by Prudencia Grillo, a lady of noble birth, and received its Constitution from Father Alfonso of Orozco. Juan de Ribera, Archbishop of Valencia (d. 1611), founded a second Discalced Augustinian congregation at Alcoy, in 1597. It soon had houses in different parts of Spain, and in 1663 was established at Lisbon by Queen Louise of Portugal. In addition to the Rule of St. Augustine these religious observed the exercises of the Reformed Carmelites of St. Teresa.

A congregation of Augustinian nuns under the title "Sisters of St. Ignatius" was introduced into the Philippines and South America by the Discalced Augustinian Hermits. They worked zealously in aid of the missions, schools and orphanages in the island, and founded the colleges of Our Lady of Consolation and of St. Anne at Manila, and houses at Nueva Segovia (now known as Lal-lo), Cebú and Mandaloya on the Pasig, where they have done much for the education of girls.

== Candidates for Sainthood ==
Blesseds

- Ines de Beniganim (Josefa María of Saint Agnes) (9 February 1625 – 21 January 1696), nun, beatified on 26 February 1888
- Josefa Ramona Masiá Ferragud (Josefa Ramona of the Purification) (10 June 1897 – 25 October 1936), Discalced Augustinian nun martyred during the Spanish Civil War, beatified on 11 March 2001

Venerables

- Giovanni Nicolucci (Giovanni of Saint William) (15 July 1552 – 15 August 1621), priest, declared Venerable on 21 September 1770
- Marino Sanguineti (Carlo Giacinto of Saint Mary) (5 September 1658 – 23 April 1721), priest, declared Venerable on 19 December 1937
- Vito Antonio di Santo (Santo of Saint Dominic) (5 August 1655 – 16 January 1728), priest, declared Venerable on 13 May 1989

Servants of God

- María Ana Simeón Fuster (Mariana of Saint Simon) (c. November 1569 – 25 February 1631), nun
- Antonio di Luca (Alipio of Saint Joseph) (4 September 1617 – 17 February 1645), martyred in Libya
- Jean-François-Xavier Roux (François-Régis) (c. 1739 – 16 December 1793), Martyr of the French Revolution, declared as a Servant of God on 20 June 2023
- Andrej Chmeľ (Alojz Mária of Jesus Crucified) (17 October 1913 – 16 August 1939), Slovak cleric, declared as a Servant of God on 29 October 1996
- Angelo Possidio Carù (Possidius Francis of Jesus Crucified) (17 February 1925 - 23 May 1995) Missionary in Brazil, declared a Servant of God on 26 February 2025

== Other notable members ==
- Thomas of Jesus, 16th century reformer and preacher, instrumental in creating the Discalced Augustinians
- Stefano da San Gregorio, 17th century mathematician and theologian
