= George Hamilton, Comte d'Hamilton =

Irish soldier in French service (died 1676)

Sir George Hamilton
- Called "Comte d'Hamilton"
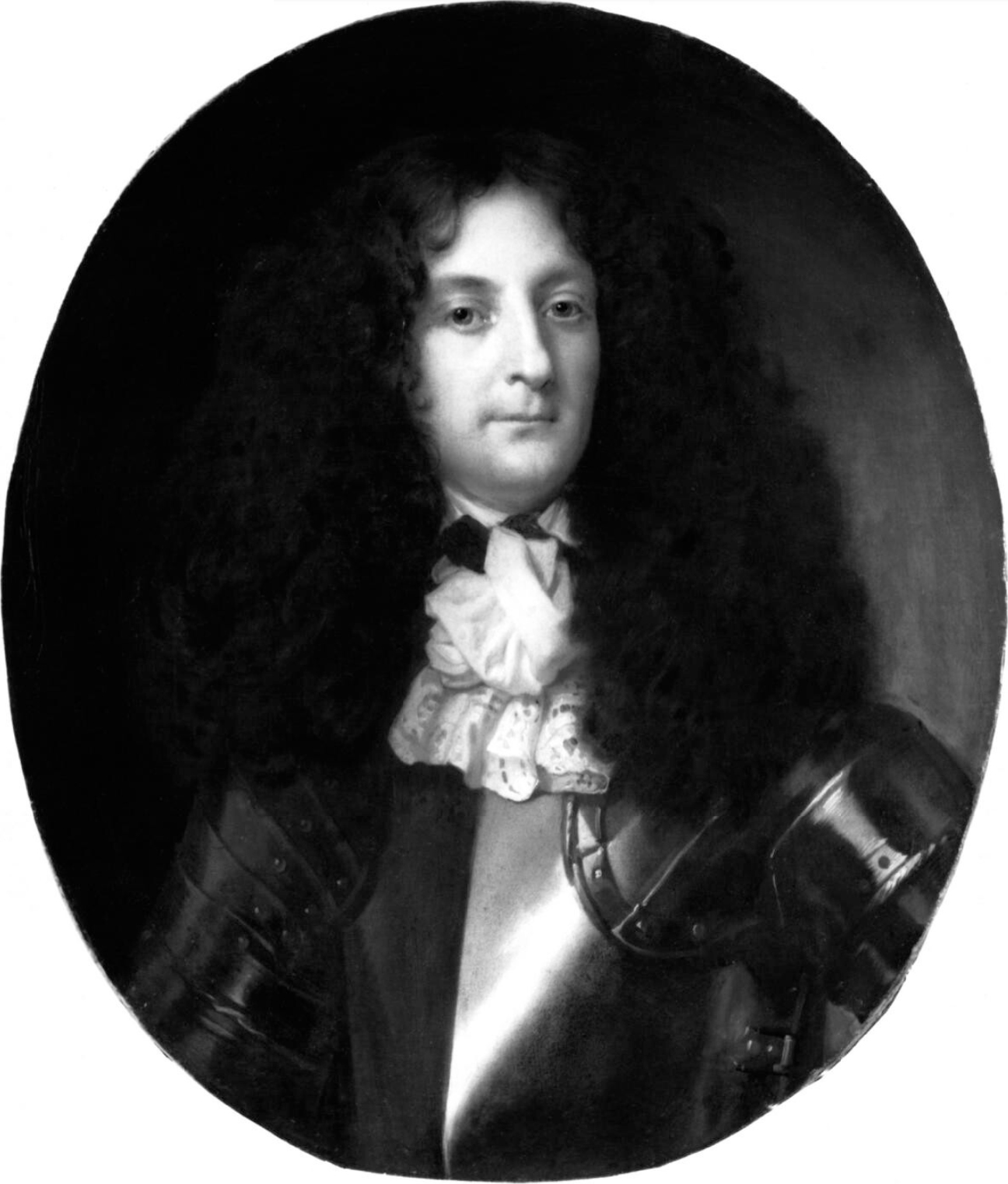
- Detail from the portrait below
- Died: 1 June 1676; Col de Saverne, France
- Spouse: Frances Jennings
- Issue Detail: Elizabeth, Frances, Mary, & Henrietta
- Father: George Hamilton
- Mother: Mary Butler

Sir George Hamilton, Comte d'Hamilton (died 1676) was an Irish soldier in English and French service as well as a courtier at Charles II's Whitehall.

At Whitehall he was a favourite of the King. He courted La belle Stuart and married Frances Jennings, the future Lady Tyrconnell, who was then a maid of honour of the Duchess of York. He appears in the Mémoires du comte de Grammont, written by his brother Anthony.

He began his military career as an officer in the Life Guards but was dismissed in an anti-Catholic purge in 1667, upon which he took French service and commanded English gens d'armes and then an Irish regiment in the Franco-Dutch War (1672–1678). He served under Turenne at the battles of Sinsheim and Entzheim in 1674. He was at Sasbach (1675), when Turenne was killed. He then covered the retreat at Altenheim. He was killed in 1676 in a rearguard action at the Col de Saverne while serving under Marshal Luxembourg. His final rank was Maréchal de camp (major-general). He was known as "comte", but whether he was really ennobled by Louis XIV is not sure.

Family tree

George Hamilton with wife, parents, daughters ("the 3 viscountesses"), and other selected relatives. (Note: This family tree is partly derived from the Abercorn pedigree pictured in Cokayne and from written genealogies of the Abercorns. Also see the list of children in the text.)

Claud; 1st Ld; Paisley; 1546–1621	Margaret; Seton d. 1616	Walter; 11th Earl; 1559 – 1632/3 'Beads'
James; 1st Earl; Abercorn; 1575–1618	Marion; Boyd d. 1632; Recusant	George of Greenlaw & Roscrea d. bef. 1657	Thomas; Butler; Viscount; Thurles d. 1619	Elizabeth; Pointz; 1587–1673
James; 2nd Earl d. c. 1670	George; 1st Bt. Donalong c. 1607 – 1679	Mary; Butler d. 1680	James; 1st Duke; Ormond; 1610–1688
James c. 1630 – 1673; Courtier	Elizabeth; 1641–1708; Beauty	George d. 1676	Frances; Jennings c. 1647 – 1730	Anthony c. 1645 – 1719; Writer
Richard; 1st Viscount; Rosse; 1657–1703	Elizabeth; 1667–1724	Henry; 8th Viscount; Dillon d. 1713	Frances d. 1751	Nicholas; 3rd Viscount; Barnewall; 1668–1725	Mary; 1676–1736
Richard; 1st Earl d. 1741	Richard; 9th Viscount d. 1737	Henry; 4th Viscount; 1708–1774

Legend

XXX	Subject of the article	XXX	Dukes and Earls of Ormond	XXX	Earls of Abercorn

XXX	Viscounts & earls of Rosse	XXX	Viscounts; Dillon	XXX	Viscounts; Barnewall

== Birth and origins ==
George was probably born in the late 1630s or early 1640s (Note: Strictly speaking, his birth date is constrained by the marriage of his parents (1635), plus the gestation of his eldest brother James, and the date of birth of his younger brother Anthony in 1645 or 1646.) in Ireland. He was the second son of George Hamilton and his wife Mary Butler. His father was Scottish, the fourth son of James Hamilton, 1st Earl of Abercorn, and would in 1660 be created Baronet of Donalong and Nenagh. The Dunnalong (or Donalong) estate, south of Derry, was his father's share of the land granted to his grandfather Abercorn during the Plantation of Ulster.

George's mother was half Irish and half English, the third daughter of Thomas Butler, Viscount Thurles and his English Catholic wife Elizabeth Poyntz. Viscount Thurles (courtesy title) predeceased his father, Walter Butler, 11th Earl of Ormond, and therefore never succeeded to the earldom. The Butlers were Old English. George's mother also was a sister of James Butler, making her husband a brother-in-law of the lord lieutenant.

George's parents have often been confused with another George Hamilton, married with another Mary Butler. These are his father's uncle Sir George Hamilton of Greenlaw and Roscrea and his wife Mary, sixth daughter of Walter Butler, 11th Earl of Ormond. This other George Hamilton lived in Roscrea.

George was one of nine siblings. See James, Elizabeth, Anthony, Richard, and John. (Note: George's father's article gives a list of all the nine siblings.)

Both his parents were Catholic, but some relatives, on his father's as on his mother's side, were Protestants. His grandfather, James Hamilton, 1st Earl of Abercorn, had been a Protestant, but his father and all his paternal uncles were raised as Catholics due to the influence of his paternal grandmother, Marion Boyd, a recusant. Some branches of the Hamilton family were Protestant, such as that of his father's second cousin Gustavus (1642–1723). His mother's family, the Butlers, were generally Catholic with the exception of the future 1st Duke of Ormond, his maternal uncle. His eldest brother, James, would turn Protestant when marrying Elizabeth Colepeper in 1661. His brother Thomas also conformed to the established religion as he became a captain in the Royal Navy.

== Early life ==
=== Irish wars ===
Hamilton's father, Sir George Hamilton, Baronet, served Ormond, the Lord Lieutenant of Ireland, during the Irish Confederate Wars (1641–1648) and the Cromwellian conquest of Ireland (1649–1653) and followed him into exile in 1651.

Young George lived with his mother in Nenagh, deep in Confederate territory but being Catholic they were not troubled and anyway fighting was halted by a truce in 1643. Their security deteriorated when Rinuccini in 1646 rejected the First Ormond Peace. In May Lady Hamilton with George and his siblings were brought to Dublin for their security. Owen Roe O'Neill's Confederate Ulster Army took Roscrea Castle 30 kilometres (19 mi) east of Nenagh on 17 September 1646. In 1648 Ulster troops took Nenagh Castle, but it was retaken that same year by Murrough O'Brien, 6th Baron Inchiquin.

In October 1650 Hamilton's father was governor of Nenagh for the Royalist Alliance when the Parliamentarian army under Henry Ireton and Daniel Abbot attacked and captured the castle on the way back from their failed siege of Limerick to their winter quarters at Kilkenny.

=== First exile ===
In spring 1651, Sir George Hamilton, Baronet, and his family followed Ormond into French exile. They first went to Caen, where they were accommodated for some time by the Marchioness of Ormond. They then moved to Paris where Charles II and his mother Henrietta Maria lived in exile at the Louvre and the Chateau-Neuf de Saint-Germain-en-Laye. Young Hamilton, aged about 10, became a page to the King. France was at that time fighting the long Franco-Spanish War (1635–1659). In 1654 France gained Cromwell as an ally against Spain resulting in the Anglo-Spanish War (1654–1660), and in consequence Charles II had to leave France. He moved his court first to Cologne, then in March 1656 to Brussels where on 2 April 1656, Ormond and Rochester signed in Charles's name the Treaty of Brussels with Spain. On 22 April Charles moved to Bruges.

In 1657 Hamilton was present during a polite chat under the walls of Mardyck between royalists and parliamentarians who were at war with each other. Hamilton accompanied James Livingston, 1st Earl of Newburgh, a royalist, who asked to speak to Sir John Reynolds, who held Mardyck for the parliament. Hamilton then fetched the Duke of York as Reynolds desired to make his acquaintance.

On 14 June 1658 Charles' brother James, the Duke of York, led the royalists in the Battle of the Dunes and was defeated by Turenne. The King then moved to Antwerp. On 3 September 1658 Cromwell died. On 7 February 1658 the King was allowed back to Brussels.

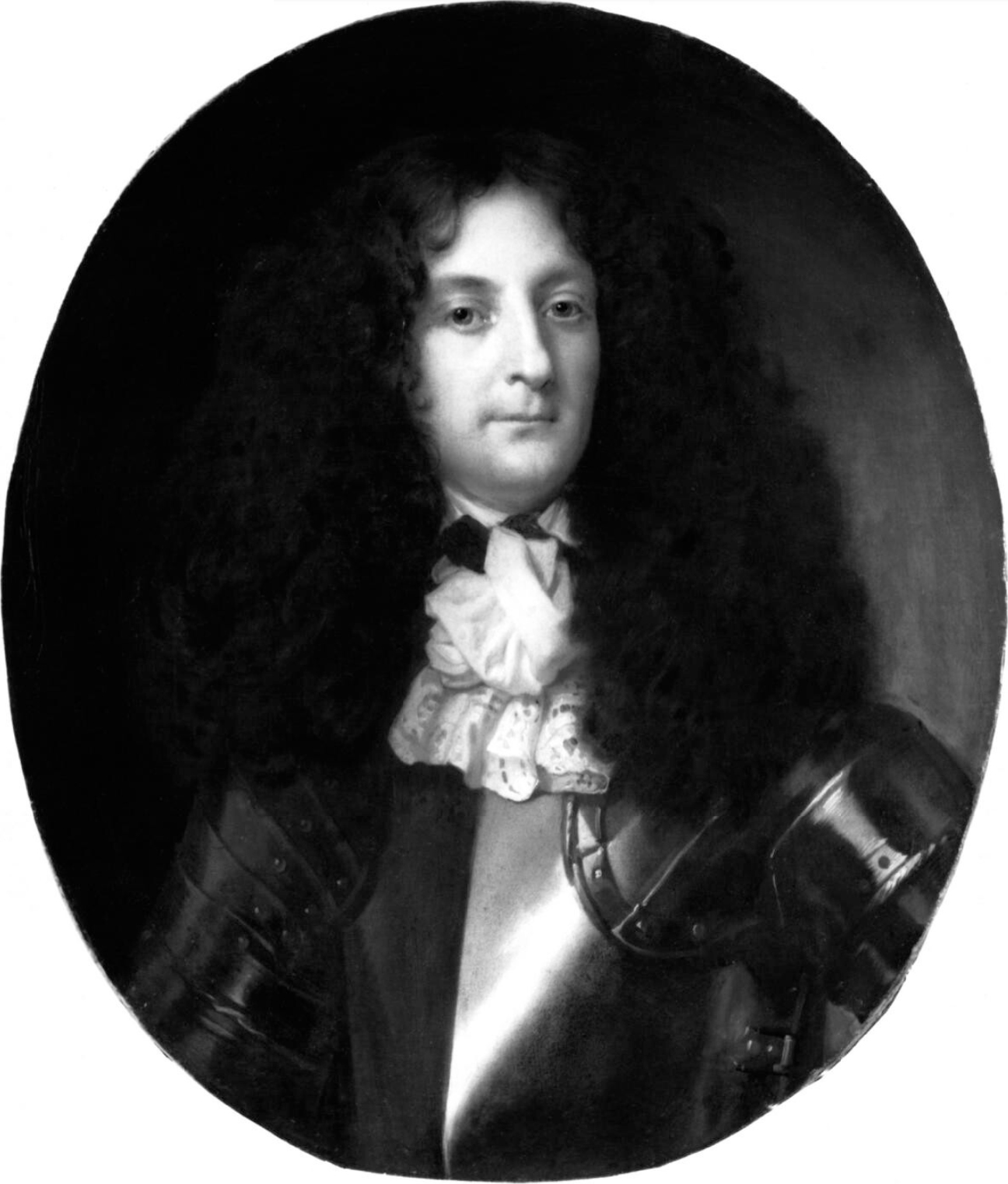
Sir George Hamilton, painted about 1670. (Note: The original oil painting, created about 1670, was lost in a fire at Ditton Park in 1812, the one at NPG (NPG 1468) is a copy. The NPG website identifies the sitter as "Sir George Hamilton, 1st Bt (circa 1607-1679)", but older catalogues identify him as "George (Count) Hamilton". This painting is reproduced in Sergeant (1913) where the caption reads "Sir George (Count) Hamilton From a photograph, by Emery Walker, of the picture in the National Portrait Gallery". We therefore have two contradicting identifications.)

=== Restoration ===
At the Restoration, Hamilton was accepted into the Life Guards that Charles II and the Duke of York established early in 1660 in preparation of their return to London. Hamilton served in the King's troop, which was commanded by Charles Gerard as captain and colonel. Hamilton was an officer rather than a private.

After the King's return to London in May 1660, Hamilton attended the court at Whitehall in addition to his military duties. He, like his brothers James and Anthony, and his sister Elizabeth, were part of to the inner circle around the King. Samuel Pepys reports that Hamilton was present at the Queen's Birthday dance on 15 October 1666 at Whitehall.

At court Hamilton met Elizabeth Wetenhall and fell in love with her, but she was married. He then courted Frances Stewart, called "La Belle Stuart" or the "fair Stuart", a maid of honour of the Queen, Catherine of Braganza. Gramont warned Hamilton about courting the fair Stuart as the King had set his eyes on her. Eventually, he met and courted Frances Jennings, a maid of honour of Anne Hyde, the Duchess of York. Macaulay describes her as "beautiful Fanny Jennings, the loveliest coquette in the brilliant Whitehall of the Restoration."

== Marriage and children ==
In 1665 Hamilton married Frances Jennings. The King approved of this marriage and granted the couple a pension of £500 per year (about £100,000 in 2025). His marriage is the sixth of the seven marriages with which end the Memoirs of Count Grammont.

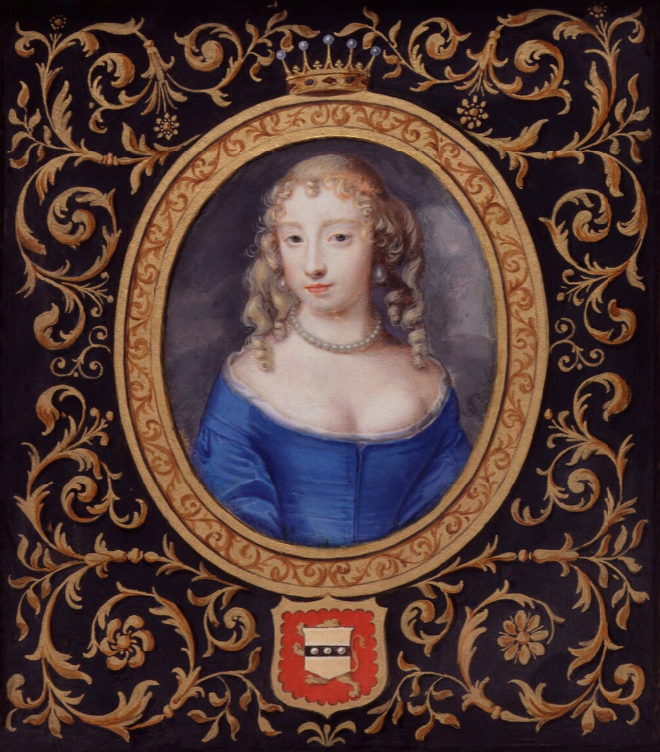
His wife, Frances Jennings (Note: Miniature by Samuel Cooper c. 1665, NPG 5095)

George and Frances had six children, but only four (all daughters) seem to be known by name:

1. Elizabeth (1667–1724), married in 1685 Richard Parsons, 1st Viscount Rosse as his 3rd wife, and was mother of Richard Parsons, 1st Earl of Rosse
2. Frances (died 1751), married Henry Dillon, 8th Viscount Dillon in 1687
3. Mary (died 1736), married Nicholas Barnewall, 3rd Viscount Barnewall in 1688
4. Henrietta, seems to have been younger than the three listed above

Elizabeth, the eldest, was born in England in 1667 and baptised on 21 March at St Margaret's, Westminster, in an Anglican ceremony. The others were born in France and were brought up as Catholics. The eldest married a Protestant; the younger two married Catholics. All three married Irish viscounts and were therefore known as the "three viscountesses".

Lord Beaulieu, who owned the portrait of George Hamilton used in this article, was one of Elizabeth's grandsons. Her descendance through her two sons went extinct in 1764, but her second daughter, called Catharine, married in 1705 James Hussey and was by him mother of Edward Hussey-Montagu, 1st Earl Beaulieu.

== Later life ==
=== Second Anglo-Dutch War ===
On 4 March 1665 the Second Anglo-Dutch War (1665–1667) broke out. Hamilton joined the Royal Navy as a volunteer and on 3 June 1665 O.S. took part in the naval battle of Lowestoft, an English victory.

=== Second exile ===
On 28 September 1667, in an increasingly anti-Catholic political climate, the King felt obliged to dismiss from his Life Guards the Catholics who refused to take the Oath of Supremacy, and among them, Hamilton. The king arranged with Louis XIV that Hamilton would be made the captain-lieutenant of a company of gens d'armes under Louis's direct command as captain. On 1 February 1668 Hamilton left England for France passing by Dover and Ostend. He seems to have been knighted by the King before his departure as he is called Sir for the first time on his passport dated 14 January 1668. Hamilton's gens d'armes were part of Louis's body guard.

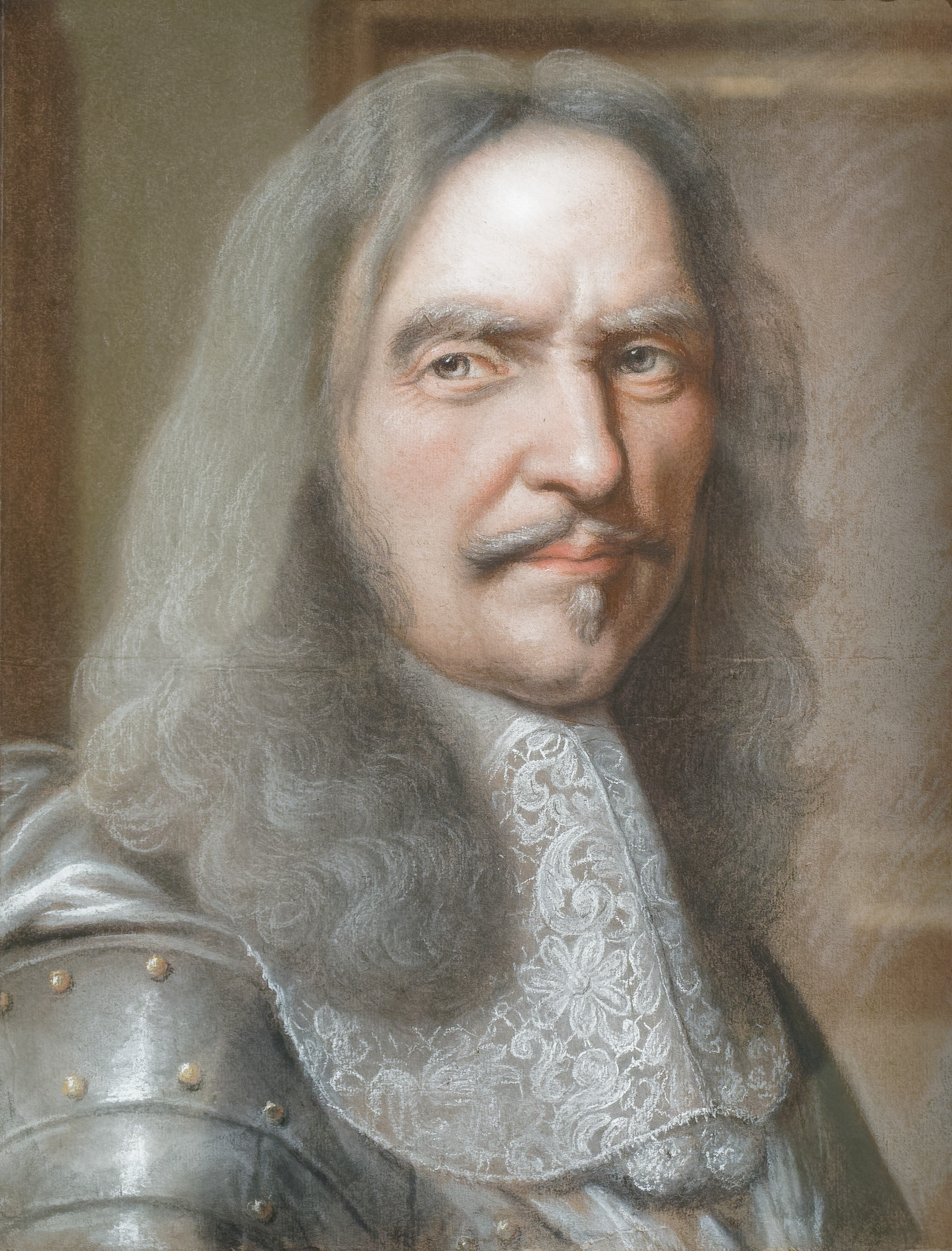
Marshal Turenne

His wife followed him to France and converted to the Catholic religion. She stayed in Paris. Hamilton with his gens d'armes probably took part in the first conquest of the Franche-Comté during the War of Devolution 1667/1668. The campaign ended on 19 February 1686 with the capitulation of Gray in presence of Louis XIV. (Note: Ruth Clark, however, thinks he could not have got there in time.) Soon France was in peace talks with Spain that would lead to the Treaty of Aix-la-Chapelle in May 1668. In 1668 Hamilton acquired French nationality.

In 1671 Hamilton raised an infantry regiment of 1,500 men in Ireland. Some of the officers who served in this régiment d'Hamilton would earn fame: Patrick Sarsfield, Justin McCarty, George's younger brothers Anthony and Richard, his cousin Gustavus Hamilton, and Thomas Dongan, who was appointed lieutenant-colonel.

In April 1672 France and England declared war on the Dutch Republic; the former starting the Franco-Dutch War (1672–1678), the latter the Third Anglo-Dutch War. Hamilton would pass the rest of his life fighting for France in that war, eventually being killed in action. The first three years he served under Henri, Viscount of Turenne. In the first year of the war, which the Dutch call the rampjaar (disaster-year), Hamilton's regiment was first employed to garrison Liège but joined Louis's main army after the crossing of the Rhine in June. The regiment took part in the siege of Utrecht, which fell on the 20th. After the Dutch had flooded the land to the north, most of the French troops retreated, but Hamilton's regiment stayed behind with the small army of occupation under Marshal Luxembourg, being stationed at Zutphen in Gelderland to the east of Utrecht. In the summer 1673 he joined Turenne's army.

In February 1674 England and the Netherlands concluded the Treaty of Westminster (1674), which ended the Third Anglo-Dutch War, but the Franco-Dutch war continued. This peace did therefore not affect Hamilton, who served under French command. However, from there on to the Treaties of Nijmegen, which ended the Franco-Dutch war, the English Parliament pushed for measures to forbid the King's subjects to fight in French service. On 8 May 1675 the Parliament forced Charles to make a proclamation demanding the immediate return of all his subjects that had gone into French service since the date of the Treaty of Westminster and forbidding all his subjects to enter that service. This made recruiting for Hamilton's regiment difficult.

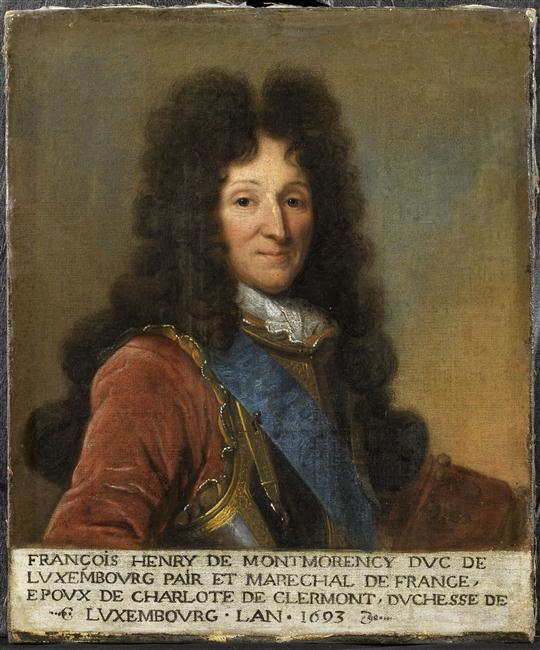
Marshal Luxembourg

On 16 June 1674 Turenne fought the battle of Sinsheim, south of Heidelberg, against the Imperials under Aeneas de Caprara. Hamilton commanded three battalions at that occasion, the two of his own regiment and one from the Monmouth regiment. In July Hamilton's regiment took part in the first ravaging of the Palatinate.

On 4 October Hamilton fought the Imperial forces under the Duke von Bournonville at Entzheim and was wounded.

In March 1675 Hamilton visited England with his younger brothers Anthony and Richard. George returned to France from England, whereas Anthony and Richard continued to Ireland to recruit as the battles of Sinsheim and Entzheim had left gaps in the ranks. The recruits were picked up by French ships at Kinsale in April after a missed appointment at Dingle in March.

Anthony's and Richard's voyage to Ireland caused them to miss Turenne's winter campaign 1674–1675, during which the French marched south and surprised the Germans by attacking them in Upper Alsace. According to James Balfour Paul George excelled at Turenne's victory at Turckheim on 5 January 1675, but according to Clark he was absent.

On 27 July 1675 Hamilton was at his side when Turenne was killed at Sasbach. The French retreated, pursued by the imperial army under Raimondo Montecuccoli, resulting in rearguard actions known as the Battle of Altenheim where Hamilton and his Irish excelled. In this battle the French army was commanded by the comte Guy Aldonce de Durfort de Lorges and the marquis de Vaubrun, who was slain in the action. Hamilton and his unit were part of the rearguard under Louis de Boufflers. After Altenheim Louis XIV called in Louis, Grand Condé to take over the command of the Rhine Army.

In January 1676 Hamilton went to Ireland to recruit as Altenheim had taken its toll. The recruiting was tolerated by Essex, the Lord Lieutenant of Ireland on instruction by the King. In February 1676 Hamilton was promoted maréchal de camp (major-general) for his achievements at Altenheim. On 10 March 1676 (N.S.) François-Henri de Montmorency, duc de Luxembourg replaced the Grand Condé, who was old, sick, and tired.

=== Comte d'Hamilton ===
French sources generally call Hamilton not chevalier [knight] but comte [count] and once even marquis [marquess]. The Gazette de France of 26 June 1674 mentions Comte d'Hamilton as one of the French commanders at the Battle of Sinsheim. This might simply reflect the belief held by the French that he was a nobleman in England, Scotland, or Ireland, or shear cautious politeness from their part. The French genealogist François-Alexandre Aubert de La Chesnaye Des Bois mentions the Hamiltons as a Scottish noble family that gave rise to a Duc de Châtelleraut and mentions Hamilton's father, George, as Count of Hamilton, Anthony as Comte Antoine Hamilton, but not George Hamilton.

Many English sources also call him count. Ó Ciardha (2009) says he was made a count in February 1676, ennobled by Louis XIV, This might simply echo the French use, taking for truth what is maybe a mistake or politeness. To call George Hamilton the father "the baronet" and his son "the count" is a neat way to distinguish them. Sergeant (1913) thinks he was made a count soon after he obtained French nationality. Ó Ciardha believes he was made a count in February 1676 after his achievements at Altenheim.

No source seems to mention a territorial designation or to state that Hamilton owned land that was erected as comté as was done in some other cases. (Note: For example when Claude de Mesmes was ennobled as comte d'Avaux in 1638.)

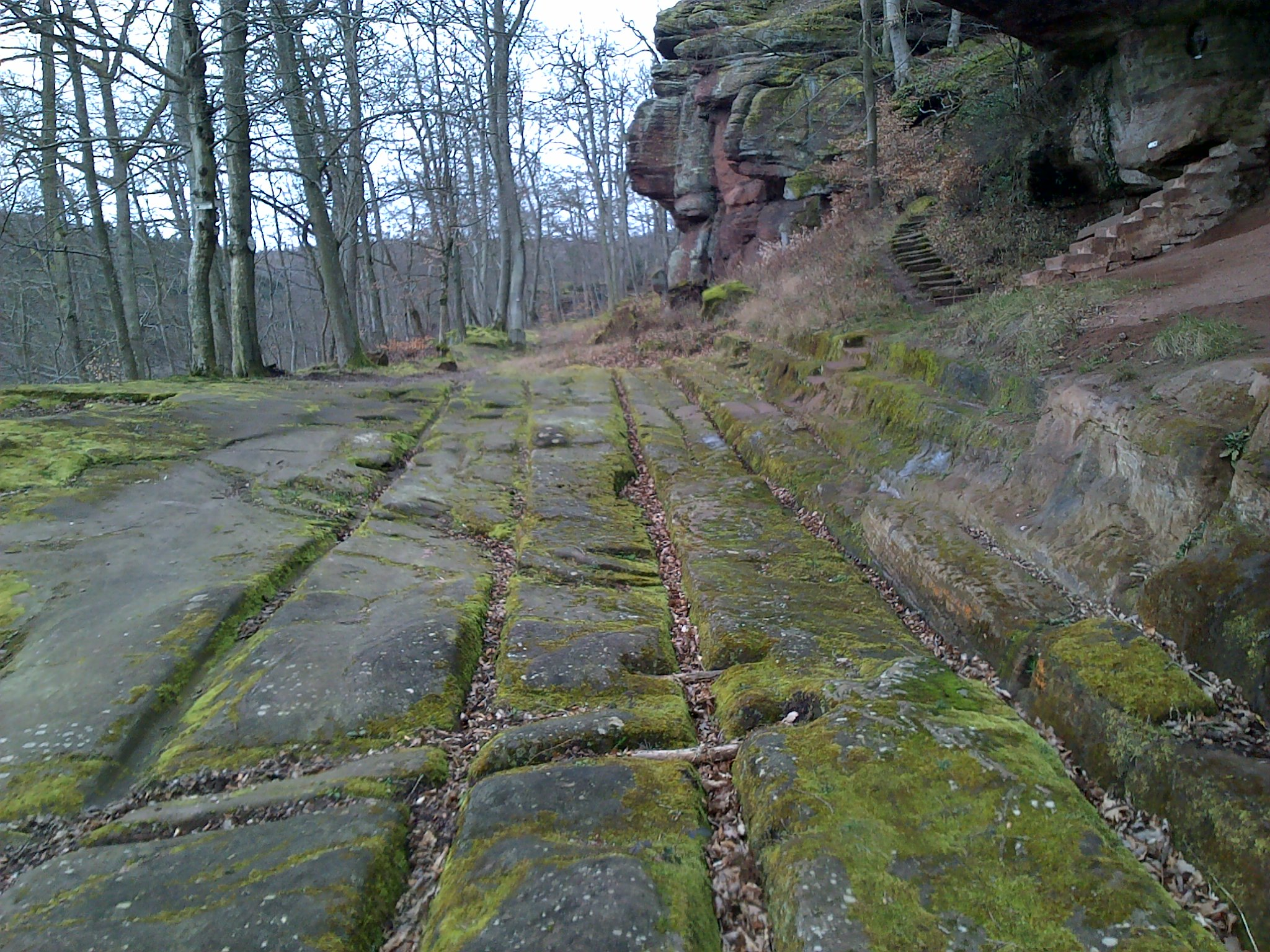
Old road over the Col de Saverne

== Death and timeline ==
Luxembourg's attempts to relieve the Siege of Philippsburg resulted in many marches and countermarches. Hamilton was killed on 1 June 1676 while commanding Luxembourg's rear-guard at the Col de Saverne (Zebernstieg in Alsatian) where imperial troops under Charles V, Duke of Lorraine pursued the French who were retreating eastwards to Saverne in lower Alsace. His younger brother Anthony supposedly succeeded him as comte d'Hamilton, but King Charles and his brother the Duke of York insisted that Thomas Dongan should succeed as colonel buying the regiment from the Hamiltons. Despite Luxembourg's efforts Philippsburg surrendered on the 17 September 1676.

Timeline
As his birth date is uncertain, so are all his ages. Italics for historical background.
Age	Date	Event
0	Estimated 1640	Born, probably at Nenagh, Tipperary, Ireland.
0–1	1641	Sister Elizabeth born
0–1	23 Oct 1641	Outbreak of the Rebellion
2–3	15 Sep 1643	Cessation (truce) between the Confederates and the government
8–9	30 Jan 1649	Charles I beheaded.
9–10	Oct 1650	Father defended Nenagh Castle against the Parliamentarians.
10–11	1651	Fled to France with his family; became a page to Charles II
17–18	14 Jun 1658	Battle of the Dunes
17–18	3 Sep 1658	Oliver Cromwell died.
19–20	29 May 1660	Restoration of Charles II
19–20	1660	Followed Charles II to England and became an officer in the Life Guards.
24–25	Early in 1665	Married Frances Jennings
24–25	3 Jun 1665	Took part in the naval Battle of Lowestoft against the Dutch
26–27	21 Mar 1667	Daughter Elizabeth baptised at St. Margaret's, Westminster, London
26–27	28 Sep 1667	Dismissed from the Life Guards
27–28	1 Feb 1668	Left England and went to France
30–31	1671	Recruited an Irish infantry regiment for French service
31–32	12 Mar 1672	Beginning of the Third Anglo-Dutch War.
32–33	6 Jun 1673	Brother James died after losing a leg in a sea-fight with the Dutch.
33–34	19 Feb 1674	First Anglo-Dutch War ended with Treaty of Westminster
33–34	16 Jun 1674	Fought at Sinsheim
33–34	6 Oct 1674	Fought at Entzheim and was wounded
33–34	8 May 1675	The King's proclamation concerning French service
34–35	27 Jul 1675	Was at Sasbach when Turenne was killed
34–35	Aug 1675	Fought rearguard actions at Altenheim
35–36	1 Jun 1676	Killed in a rearguard action on the Col de Saverne

== Notes and references ==
=== Sources ===
Subject matter monographs:

- Ó Ciardha in Dictionary of Irish Biography

- Airy, Osmund (1886). "Butler, James, twelfth Earl and first Duke of Ormonde (1610–1688)". In Lee, Sidney (ed.). Dictionary of National Biography. Vol. VIII. New York: MacMillan and Co. pp. 52–60. OCLC 8544105.
- Airy, Osmund (1904). Charles II (New ed.). London: Longmans, Green, and Co. OCLC 1041771783.
- Akin, James (1797). "Guards". Encyclopædia Britannica. Vol. 8. Philadelphia: Thomas Dobson. pp. 171–172. OCLC 1044651138. – First American edition, based on the 3rd British one.
- Atkinson, C. T. (1946). "Charles II's regiments in France, 1672–1678: Part III". Journal of the Society for Army Historical Research. 24 (100): 161–172. JSTOR 44228420.
- Bagwell, Richard (1898). "Talbot, Richard, Earl and titular Duke of Tyrconnel (1630–1691)". In Lee, Sidney (ed.). Dictionary of National Biography. Vol. LV. London: Smith, Elder, & Co. pp. 331–336. OCLC 8544105.
- Burke, Bernard (1866). A Genealogical History of the Dormant, Abeyant, Forfeited and Extinct Peerages of the British Empire (New ed.). London: Harrison. OCLC 11501348.
- Burke, Bernard (1869). A Genealogical and Heraldic Dictionary of the Peerage and Baronetage of the British Empire (31st ed.). London: Harrison. OCLC 1045624502.
- Burke, Bernard; Burke, Ashworth Peter (1915). A Genealogical and Heraldic History of the Peerage and Baronetage, the Privy Council, Knightage and Companionage (77th ed.). London: Harrison. OCLC 1155471554.
- Cannon, Richard Esq. (1837). Historical Records of the Life Guards: Containing the Accounts of the Formation of the Corps in the Year 1660, and of the Subsequent Services to 1836 (2nd ed.). London: Longman. ISBN 9780665483844. OCLC 1042044925.
- Carte, Tho. (1851) [1st pub. 1736]. The Life of James Duke of Ormond. Vol. III (New ed.). Oxford: Oxford University Press. OCLC 1086656347. – 1643 to 1660
- Clark, Ruth (1921). Anthony Hamilton: his Life and Works and his Family. London: John Lane. OCLC 459281163.
- Coffey, Diarmid (1914). O'Neill and Ormond – A Chapter of Irish History. Dublin: Maunsel & Company. OCLC 906164979.
- Corp, Edward (2004). "Hamilton, Anthony [Antoine], Count Hamilton in the French nobility (1644/5?–1719)". In Matthew, Colin; Harrison, Brian (eds.). Oxford Dictionary of National Biography. Vol. 24. New York: Oxford University Press. pp. 766–768. ISBN 0-19-861374-1.
- Cust, Lionel (1907). Historical and Descriptive Catalogue of the Pictures, Busts, &c. in the National Portrait Gallery (13th ed.). London: His/Her Majesty's Stationery Office. OCLC 45244204.
- Daniell, Francis Henry Blackburne, ed. (1907). Calendar of State Papers, Domestic Series, March 1st, 1675 to February 29th, 1676, Preserved in the Public Record Office. London: His/Her Majesty's Stationery Office. OCLC 1181376745. – 1675 to 1676
- Daniell, Francis Henry Blackburne, ed. (1911). Calendar of State Papers, Domestic Series, March 1st, 1677, to February 28th, 1678. Calendar of state papers. Domestic series. London: His/Her Majesty's Stationery Office. OCLC 271079796. – 1677 to 1678 (for daughter Henrietta)
- Debrett, John (1828a). Peerage of the United Kingdom of Great Britain and Ireland. Vol. I (17th ed.). London: F. C. and J. Rivington. OCLC 54499602. – England
- Debrett, John (1828b). Peerage of the United Kingdom of Great Britain and Ireland. Vol. II (17th ed.). London: F. C. and J. Rivington. OCLC 54499602. – Scotland and Ireland
- Evelyn, John (1901). Bray, William (ed.). The Diary of John Evelyn. Vol. II (New, in two volumes ed.). New York & London: M. Walter Dunn. OCLC 954140620. – 1665 to 1706
- Fraser, Antonia (1980) [1st pub. 1979]. Royal Charles: Charles II and the Restoration. New York: Dell Publishing. ISBN 0-440-56960-5.
- Fryde, E. B.; Greenway, D. E.; Porter, S.; Roy, I., eds. (1986). Handbook of British Chronology. Royal Historical Society Guides and Handbooks, No. 2 (3rd ed.). London: Offices of the Royal Historical Society. ISBN 0-86193-106-8. – (for timeline)
- Gatin, Jean-Henri; Besson, Louis François Nicolas (1851). Histoire de la ville de Gray et de ses monuments (in French). Besançon: Breitenstein-Rarey. OCLC 559390822.
- Gazette de France (1674). "La bataille donnée aux troupes impériales & lorraines sous le duc Charles de Lorraine et le comte Caprara". Gazette de France (in French). No. 74. p. 591. – Issue should be 74 but is written 94
- Gazette de France (1676). "Liste des officiers généraux". Gazette de France (in French). No. 20. p. 261.
- G. E. C. (1889). Complete Peerage of England, Scotland, Ireland, Great Britain and the United Kingdom, Extant, Extinct, or Dormant. Vol. II (1st ed.). London: George Bell and Sons. – Bra to C (for Butler)
- G. E. C. (1895). Complete Peerage of England, Scotland, Ireland, Great Britain and the United Kingdom, Extant, Extinct, or Dormant. Vol. VI (1st ed.). London: George Bell and Sons. OCLC 1180818801. – N to R (for Ormond)
- G. E. C. (1910). Gibbs, Vicary (ed.). The Complete Peerage of England, Scotland, Ireland, Great Britain and the United Kingdom, Extant, Extinct, or Dormant. Vol. I (2nd ed.). London: The St Catherine Press. OCLC 1042385438. – Ab-Adam to Basing (for Abercorn family tree)
- G. E. C. (1916). Gibbs, Vicary (ed.). The Complete Peerage of England, Scotland, Ireland, Great Britain and the United Kingdom, Extant, Extinct, or Dormant. Vol. IV (2nd ed.). London: The St Catherine Press. OCLC 228661424. – Dacre to Dysart (for Henry Dillon)
- Green, David (1967). Sarah Churchill, Duchess of Marlborough. New York: Charles Scribner's Sons. ISBN 0-684-12467-X.
- Grimoard, Philippe Henri de (1782). Histoire des quatre dernières campagnes du maréchal de Turenne [History of the Four last Campaigns of Marshal de Turenne] (in French). Paris: chez le chevalier de Beaurain. OCLC 475521093.
- Hamilton, Anthony (1888). Memoirs of Count Grammont. Translated by Walpole, Horace. Philadelphia: Gebbie & Co. OCLC 1048777116. – (for English quotes)
- Hartmann, Cyril Hughes (1924). La Belle Stuart. London: George Routledge & Sons. OCLC 1035924728.
- La Chenaye-Desbois (1770). Dictionnaire de la noblesse (in French). Vol. I (2nd ed.). Paris: Duchesne. OCLC 491609675. – ABA to BAR (for Avaux)
- La Chenaye-Desbois (1774). Dictionnaire de la noblesse (in French). Vol. VII (2nd ed.). Paris: Antoine Boudet. OCLC 491609675. – GAB to HAZ (for Hamilton)
- Lodge, John (1789b). Archdall, Mervyn (ed.). The Peerage of Ireland or, A Genealogical History of the Present Nobility of that Kingdom. Vol. V. Dublin: James Moore. OCLC 264906028. – Viscounts
- Longueville, Thomas (1907). Marshal Turenne. London: Longmans, Green & Co. OCLC 665146146.
- Lynn, John A. (1999). The Wars of Louis XIV 1667–1714. Harlow, England: Longman. ISBN 978-0-582-05629-9.
- Macaulay (1855). The History of England from the Accession of James the Second. Vol. III. London: Longman Brown Greens & Longmans. OCLC 1046525672. – 1689 to 1690
- Mangianiello, Stephen C. (2004). The Concise Encyclopedia of the Revolutions and Wars of England, Scotland, and Ireland 1639–1660. Lanham MD: Scarecrow Press. ISBN 0-8108-5100-8.
- Manning, Conleth (2001). "The Two Sir George Hamiltons and their Connections with the Castles of Roscrea and Nenagh" (PDF). Tipperary Historical Journal: 149–154.
- Metcalfe, W. M. (1909). A History of Paisley. Paisley: Alexander Gardner. OCLC 1046586600.
- Millar, A. H. (1890). "Hamilton, James, first Earl of Abercorn (d.1617)". In Lee, Sidney (ed.). Dictionary of National Biography. Vol. XXIV. New York: MacMillan and Co. pp. 176–177. OCLC 8544105.
- Murtagh, Harman (2004). "Hamilton, Gustavus, first Viscount Boyne (1642–1723)". In Matthew, Colin; Harrison, Brian (eds.). Oxford Dictionary of National Biography. Vol. 24. New York: Oxford University Press. pp. 809–810. ISBN 0-19-861374-1.
- National Portrait Gallery. "Sir George Hamilton, 1st Bt".
- O'Callaghan, John Cornelius (1854). History of the Irish Brigades in the Service of France. New York: P. O'Shea. OCLC 1046538374.
- Ó Ciardha, Éamonn (October 2009). "Hamilton, Sir George". In McGuire, James; Quinn, James (eds.). Dictionary of Irish Biography (online ed.).
- O'Conor, Matthew (1855). Irish Brigades: Or memoirs of the Most Eminent Irish Military Commanders who Distinguished themselves in the Elizabethan and Williamite Wars in their Own Country and in the service of France, Spain etc. Dublin: James Duffy. OCLC 18964839.
- O'Donoghue, Freeman (1910). Catalogue of Engraved British Portraits Preserved in the Department of Prints and Drawings in the British Museum. Vol. II. London: Longmans & Co. OCLC 1041770924. – D to K
- Paul, James Balfour, ed. (1904). The Scots Peerage, Founded on Wood's Edition of Sir Robert Douglas's Peerage of Scotland. Vol. I. Edinburgh: David Douglas. OCLC 505064285. – Abercorn to Balmerino
- Pepys, Samuel (1895). Wheatley, Henry Benjamin (ed.). The Diary of Samuel Pepys. Vol. VI. London: George Bell and Sons. OCLC 503692830. – 1 October 1666 to 30 June 1667
- Piper, David (1963). Catalogue of Seventeenth-Century Portraits in the National Portrait Gallery 1625–1715. Cambridge: Cambridge University Press. OCLC 963777241.
- Phillips, Walter Alison (1911). "Aix-la-Chapelle, Congresses of" . In Chisholm, Hugh (ed.). Encyclopædia Britannica. Vol. 1 (11th ed.). Cambridge University Press. p. 449.
- Quincy (1726). Histoire militaire du règne de Louis le Grand [Military History of the Reign of Louis the Great] (in French). Vol. I. Paris: Denis Mariette. OCLC 23619104. – 1643 to 1681
- Rigg, J. M. (1890). "Hamilton, Anthony (1646?–1720)". In Lee, Sidney (ed.). Dictionary of National Biography. Vol. XXIV. New York: MacMillan and Co. pp. 135–137. OCLC 8544105.
- Saint-Hilaire, Armand de Mormès seigneur de (1766). Mémoires de M. de Saint H. (in French). Vol. Tome premier. Amsterdam: Arktée & Merkus. – 1661 to 1678
- Sauvageot, Claude (1867). Palais, châteaux, hôtels et maisons de France du XVème au XVIII siècle. Vol. Deuxième. Paris: A. Morel. OCLC 174837244.
- Scott, Walter (1846). "Biographical Sketch of Anthony Hamilton". Memoirs of Court of Charles the Second by Count Grammont. London: Henry George Bohn. pp. 3–17. OCLC 870885892.
- Seaward, Paul (2004). "Charles II". In Matthew, Henry Colin Gray; Harrison, Brian (eds.). Oxford Dictionary of National Biography. Vol. 11. New York: Oxford University Press. pp. 122–145. ISBN 0-19-861361-X.
- Sergeant, Philip W. (1913). Little Jennings and Fighting Dick Talbot: A Life of the Duke and Duchess of Tyrconnel. Vol. I. London: Hutchinson. OCLC 474495830. – 1643 to 1685
- Silke, John J. (1976). "Chapter XXIII: The Irish abroad, 1534–1691". In Moody, Theodore William; Martin, F. X.; Byrne, Francis John (eds.). A New History of Ireland. Vol. III. Oxford: Oxford University Press. pp. 587–633. ISBN 978-0-1982-0242-4.
- Stuart, James (1962) [1st pub. 1696]. The Memoirs of James II: His campaigns as Duke of York 1652–1660. Translated by Sells, A. Lytton. Bloomington, Indiana: Indiana University Press. OCLC 340343.
- Warner, Ferdinand (1768a). History of the Rebellion and Civil-War in Ireland. Vol. I. Dublin: James William. OCLC 82770539. – 1641 to 1643
- Warner, Ferdinand (1768). History of the Rebellion and Civil-War in Ireland. Vol. II. Dublin: James William. OCLC 82770539. – 1643 to 1660 and index
- Wasser, Michael (2004). "Hamilton, James, first earl of Abercorn (1575–1618)". In Matthew, Colin; Harrison, Brian (eds.). Oxford Dictionary of National Biography. Vol. 24. New York: Oxford University Press. pp. 837–838. ISBN 0-19-861374-1.
- Wauchope, Piers (2004a). "Dongan, Thomas, second earl of Limerick (1634–1715)". In Matthew, Colin; Harrison, Brian (eds.). Oxford Dictionary of National Biography. Vol. 16. New York: Oxford University Press. pp. 523–524. ISBN 0-19-861366-0.
- Wauchope, Piers (2004b). "Talbot [née Jenyns; other married name Hamilton], Frances, duchess of Tyrconnell (1648–1731)". In Matthew, Colin; Harrison, Brian (eds.). Oxford Dictionary of National Biography. Vol. 53. New York: Oxford University Press. pp. 688–689. ISBN 0-19-861403-9.
- White-Spunner, Barney (2006). Horse Guards. London: Pan Macmillon. ISBN 978-1-4050-5574-1.
