= Battle of Altenheim =

1675 battle

Coordinates: 48.5353°N 7.6381°E

- Part of Franco-Dutch War
- Jean Beaurain: Map of the battle of Altenheim
Date	1 August 1675
Location	Altenheim, Neuried, Baden-Württemberg
Result	Inconclusive

Belligerents
France	Holy Roman Empire

Commanders and leaders
(Kingdom of France) de Lorges (Kingdom of France) de Vaubrun †	(Holy Roman Empire) Montecuccoli (Holy Roman Empire) Bournonville (Holy Roman Empire) Aeneas de Caprara

Strength
20,000	22,000

Casualties and losses
3,000–4,000	3,000–4,500

The Battle of Altenheim took place on 1 August 1675 during the 1672-1678 Franco-Dutch War near Altenheim, in modern Baden-Württemberg. It was fought by a French army of 20,000, jointly commanded by the Marquis de Vaubrun and the Comte de Lorges, and an Imperial Army of 30,000 under Raimondo Montecuccoli.

After two months of manoeuvring, the previous French commander, Marshall Turenne, had managed to create an opportunity to attack the Imperial army. While reviewing his position on 27 July, he was killed by a cannon shot; he had not appointed a successor, and the French army was paralysed as de Lorges and Vaubrun argued over command.

On 31 July, the French withdrew over the Rhine, using the bridge at Altenheim, but only part of the army managed to cross, leaving the majority on the German side. As they resumed crossing on 1 August, the Imperial army attacked, and at one point cut off their retreat by capturing Altenheim.

A series of charges by the French cavalry recaptured the bridge, in one of which Vaubrun was killed; the battle ended late in the day, both sides suffering heavy casualties. Although the French saved their army, they lost the initiative established by Turenne.

== Background ==
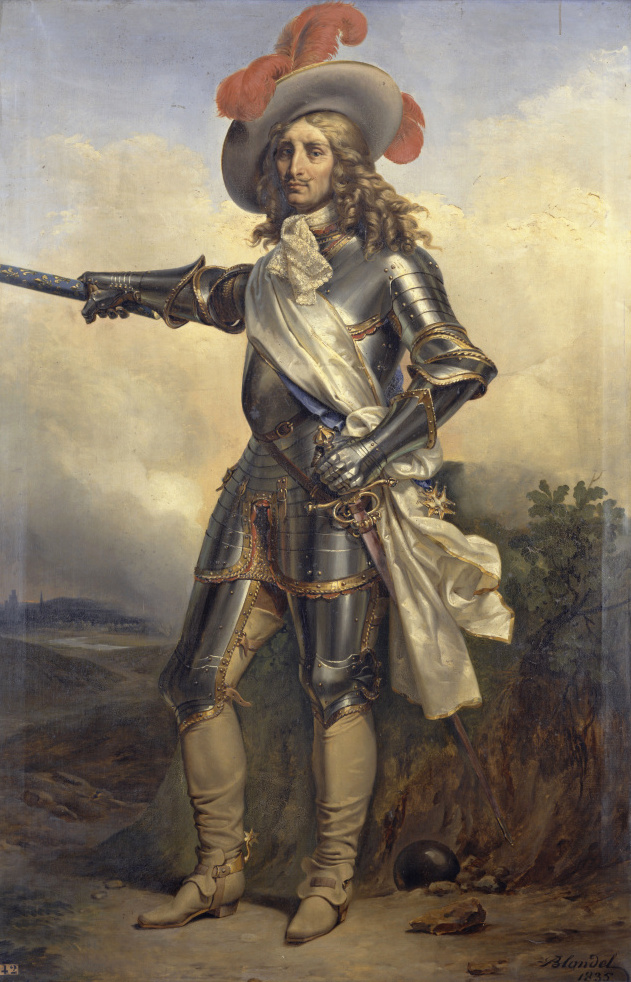
de Lorges; his quarrel with Vaubrun impacted French effectiveness

Both France and the Dutch Republic viewed the Spanish Netherlands as essential for their security and trade, making it a contested area throughout the 17th century. France occupied much of it in the 1667 to 1668 War of Devolution, before returning it to Spain in the 1668 Treaty of Aix-la-Chapelle. After this, Louis XIV decided the best way to force concessions from the Dutch was by defeating them first.

When the Franco-Dutch War began in May 1672, French troops quickly over-ran much of the Netherlands, but by July, the Dutch position had stabilised. The unexpected success of this offensive encouraged Louis to make excessive demands, while concern at French gains brought the Dutch support from Brandenburg-Prussia, the Emperor Leopold, and Charles II of Spain. In August 1673, an Imperial army entered the Rhineland; facing war on multiple fronts, the French relinquished most of their earlier gains.

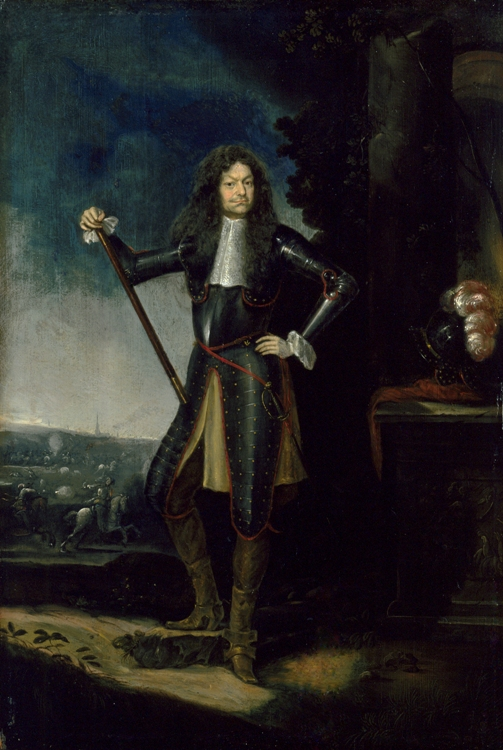
Imperial commander, Raimondo Montecuccoli, Duke of Melfi

In January 1674, Denmark joined the anti-French coalition, followed by the February Treaty of Westminster, which ended the Third Anglo-Dutch War. The Allies agreed to focus on expelling France from its remaining positions in the Netherlands, while an Imperial army opened a second front in Alsace. Turenne, French commander in the Rhineland, was ordered to prevent them breaking into Eastern France, or linking up with the Dutch.

Using a mixture of aggression, speed and daring, in 1673 he won a series of victories over the Imperialists, despite being outnumbered. The campaign that began in June 1674 and ended with his death in July 1675, has been described as 'possibly Turenne's most brilliant campaign.' He fought Bournonville to a standstill at Entzheim in early October, followed by a surprise winter attack, ending in victory at the Battle of Turckheim in January 1675. Turenne confirmed his psychological dominance over Bournonville, and by cutting him off from Strasbourg, prevented an invasion of Alsace.

In the spring, Bournonville was reinforced by 25,000 men under Raimondo Montecuccoli, one of the few generals that contemporaries considered Turenne's equal. By late May, the Imperial army was on the move, aiming to re-establish contact with Strasburg. The next two months were spent in a series of marches and counter-marches, Turenne seeking always to remain in close contact with the Imperialists; a number of minor encounters took place, Vaubrun being wounded in a skirmish on 24 July,

Local geography restricted operations to a relatively narrow corridor between the left bank of the Rhine and the Black Forest. Persistent rain in the first half of June made movement almost impossible, other factors including the need to stay close to rivers in order to receive supplies, and shortage of forage for cavalry and transport. By the end of July, Montecuccoli reached Großweier, near Salzbach, where he stopped and waited for Aeneas de Caprara to join him from Offenburg. Having decided to attack, on 27 July Turenne was scouting positions for his artillery when he was killed by a chance shot from a cannonball.

== Battle ==
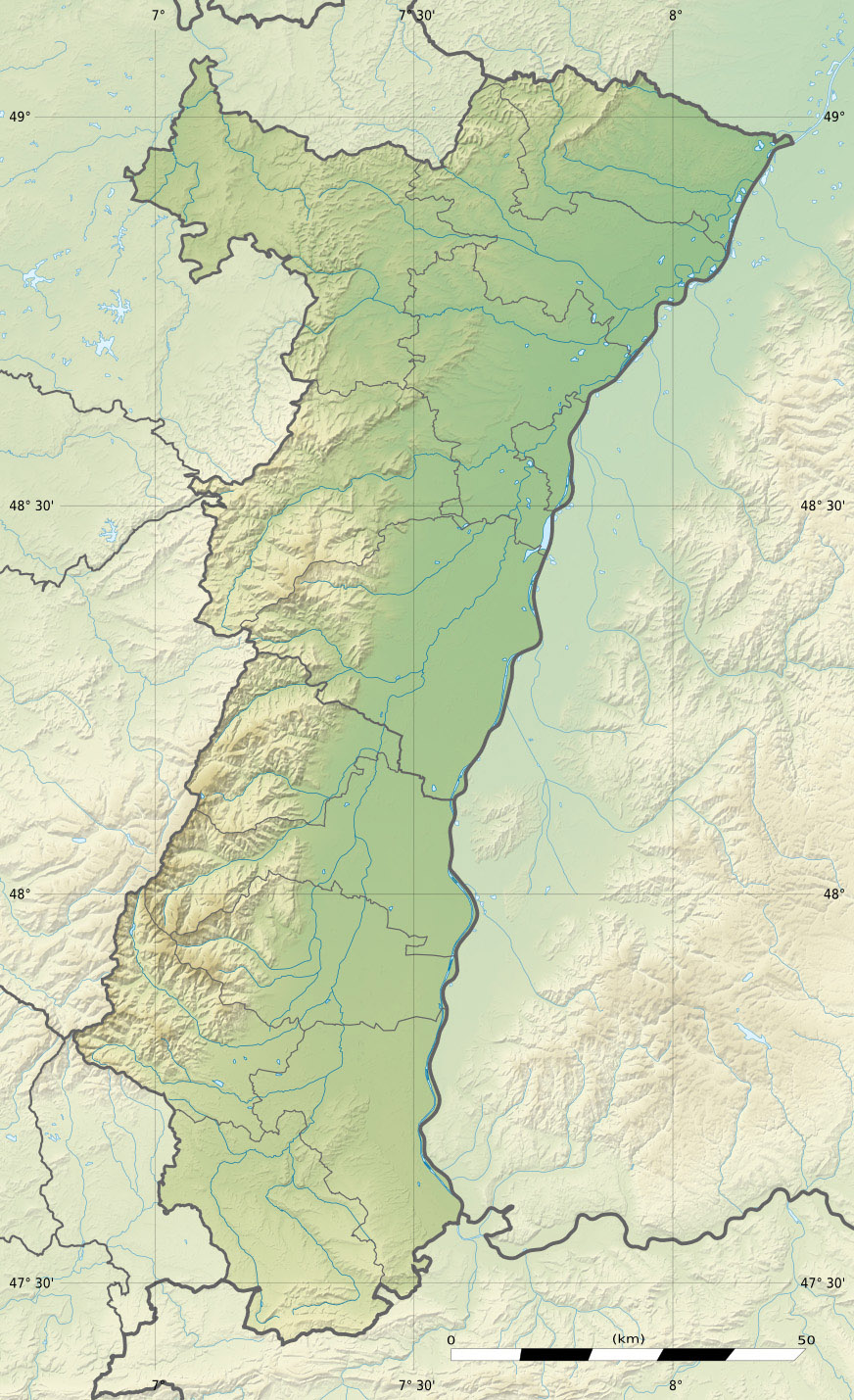
Alsace, key locations 1674-1675; the Rhine marks the modern French-German border

Turenne's death was initially concealed from the troops, but soon became common knowledge, severely impacting French morale. He had not appointed a successor, his deputies being his nephew, the Comte de Lorges, and the Marquis de Vaubrun, who was the senior officer. According to the Marquis de Feuquières, they spent the next three days arguing over who should assume command, at one point drawing swords on each other in the middle of the camp.

The result was the French simply held their position, and the two armies spent the next three days bombarding each other. On 29 July, Imperial cavalry attacked the nearby village of Willstätt, hoping to capture the French baggage train, and re-establish direct communication with Strasburg. The attack was repulsed, but the danger of their position forced de Lorge and de Vaubrun to compromise, by agreeing to rotate command daily. On 31 July, the French moved towards the bridge over the Rhine at Altenheim, a small town in the modern German state of Baden-Württemberg; as they did so, Montecuccoli made another attempt on Willstätt.

With the enemy so close, de Lorges and de Vaubrun now argued over whether to get their men over the Rhine as soon as possible, leaving the baggage behind, or to save it, and run the risk of the army being divided. They agreed on the latter, since their troops were understandably opposed to the idea of abandoning their personal possessions, but when night came on 31st, Vaubrun and the vanguard were on the French bank of the Rhine, leaving the main body under de Lorges on the other.

De Lorges began crossing early on the morning of 1 August, but to reach the bridge at Altenheim, they first had to cross the Schutter. While a relatively minor obstacle, it still caused a delay, and provided Montecuccoli an opportunity to destroy the larger part of the French army.

The French rearguard was made up of the Brigade de Champagne, and two British regiments, including one composed largely of Irish Catholics, commanded by George Hamilton. One of his junior officers was Patrick Sarsfield, who provided details of the battle in a letter sent shortly afterwards. He writes that around 10:00 am, they were attacked by the main Imperial army, while Croatian light cavalry simultaneously cut off their retreat by taking the bridge at Altenheim.

The French were now in a very dangerous situation, but recaptured Altenheim after a series of desperate cavalry charges, in one of which Vaubrun was killed. According to Sarsfield, fighting continued until 18:30, with the French rearguard repulsing repeated attacks on the bridge. The Imperialists suffered over 4,500 casualties, the French around 3,000, including 1,200 dead; the two British regiments lost 700 killed or wounded out of 1,400 engaged.

== Aftermath ==
The French withdrew to Sélestat and Condé assumed command; despite his distinguished record, he was in poor health and this would be his last campaign. On 11 August, a French force of 15,000 sent to relieve Trier was defeated at Konzer Brücke and Trier surrendered in September. Estimating Imperial strength at over 30,000, and unwilling to risk losing the only remaining French army in the Rhineland, Condé took up position at the fortified town of Châtenois. Montecuccoli attempted to lure him out, but with French cavalry raiding his supply lines and winter coming on, he abandoned the attempt, In the first week of November, his army recrossed the Rhine and went into winter quarters.

== Sources ==
- Almon, John (1760). A new military dictionary: or, the field of war. Containing a particular account of the most remarkable battles, sieges, bombardments, and relate to Great Britain and her dependencies (2018 ed.). Gale ECCO. ISBN 978-1385700778.
- Atkinson, CT (1946). "Charles II's regiments in France, 1672 - 1678". Journal of the Society for Army Historical Research. 24 (100). JSTOR 44228420.
- Bodart, Gaston (1908). Militär-historisches Kriegs-Lexikon (1618-1905).
- De Périni, Hardÿ (1896). Batailles françaises, Volume V. Ernest Flammarion, Paris.
- Chandler, David G (1979). Marlborough as Military Commander (2nd, illustrated ed.). Batsford. ISBN 978-0713420753.
- Clodfelter, Micheal (2008). Warfare and Armed Conflicts: A Statistical Encyclopedia of Casualty and Other Figures, 1494-2007. McFarland & Co. ISBN 978-0786433193.
- Guthrie, William P. (2003). The Later Thirty Years War: From the Battle of Wittstock to the Treaty of Westphalia (Contributions in Military Studies). Praeger. ISBN 978-0313324086.
- Hutton, Ronald (1989). Charles II King of England, Scotland and Ireland. Clarendon Press. ISBN 978-0198229117.
- Lynn, John A. (1999). The Wars of Louis XIV, 1667–1714. Addison Wesley Longman. ISBN 978-0582056299.
- Macintosh, Claude Truman (1973). French Diplomacy during the War of Devolution, the Triple Alliance and the Treaty of Aix-la-Chapelle (PhD). Ohio State University.
