= Guy Aldonce de Durfort, 1st Duke of Quintin =

French marshal (1630–1702)

Guy Aldonce de Durfort
- 1st Duke of Lorges; 1st Duke of Quintin
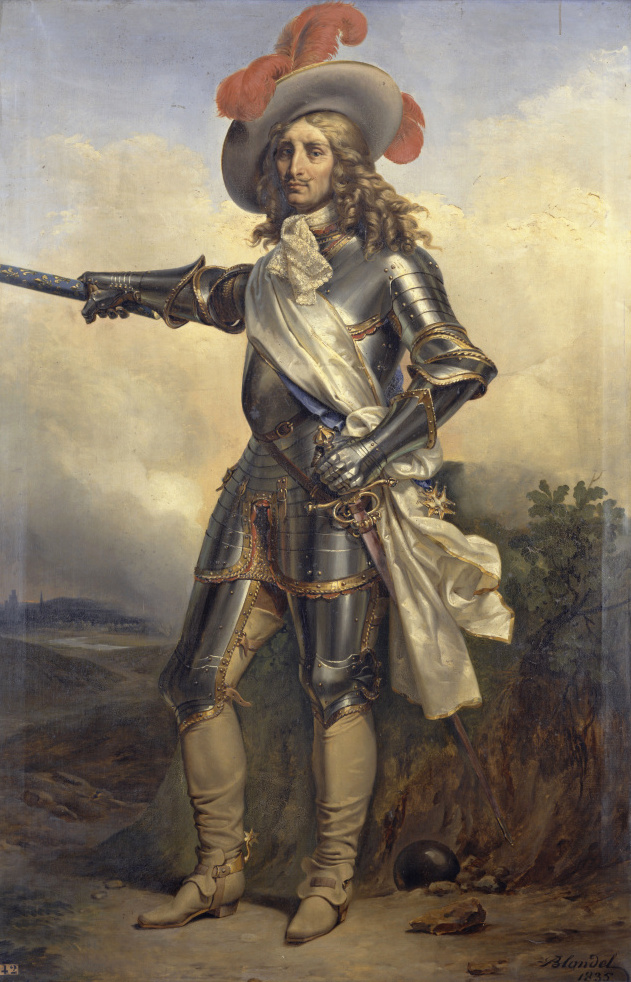
- Detail from the portrait further down
- Tenure: 1691–1702
- Successor: Guy Nicolas de Durfort
- Born: 22 August 1630; Château de Duras
- Died: 22 October 1702; Paris
- Spouse: Geneviève de Frémont
- Issue Detail: Marie Gabrielle, Duchess of Saint Simon; Geneviève Marie, Duchess of Lauzun; Guy Nicolas, Duke of Quintin, Duke of Lorges; Marie Geneviève Duchess of Thouars; Guy Louis, Duke of Lorges
- Father: Guy Aldonce de Durfort
- Mother: Elisabeth de La Tour d'Auvergne

Guy Aldonce de Durfort, 1st Duke of Lorges, Marshal of France, (1630–1702) fought in the Franco-Dutch War mostly on the Rhine under his uncle Marshal Turenne, but in 1673 he was seconded to the Siege of Maastricht. Back on the Rhine, he fought at Entzheim in 1674, at Turckheim in January 1675, and at Sasbach in July 1675, where Turenne fell. He distinguished himself at the retreat from Sasbach and the ensuing Battle of Altenheim.

In the Nine Years' War he commanded the Rhine army and took the city and the castle of Heidelberg in 1693. He is often mentioned in Saint-Simon's Mémoires as he was the author's father-in-law. Created the 2st Duke of Quintin in 1691, he was known as the 1st Duke of Lorges.

== Birth and origins ==
Guy Aldonce was born on 22 August 1630, at the Château de Duras, the fourth son of Guy Aldonce de Durfort (1605–1665) and Elisabeth de La Tour d'Auvergne. His father was marquis of Duras, comte de Rauzan and comte de Lorges, as well as maréchal de camp in the French army. The Durfort family held Duras since the 14th century. Guy's mother was a daughter of Henri de La Tour d'Auvergne and sister of the Marshal Turenne. Both his parents were Calvinists. Later in life, following the example of his uncle, he and his older brother converted to Catholicism

Guy was the fourth son, but his twin brother, Armand, died as an infant and he thereafter occupied the third position and was often counted as the third son. His father distributed his subsidiary titles as courtesy titles among his sons. Guy was thus, after the death of his twin brother, styled comte de Lorges and was called Lorges, sometimes spelt Lorge, notably by Saint-Simon. He was numbered "Guy Aldonce II de Durfort" in the Durfort family, whereas his father was numbered "Guy Aldonce I de Durfort".

Guy's eldest brother, Jacques Henri de Durfort de Duras, also became a Marshal of France. Their uncle Turenne probably helped to further the careers of both brothers.

Family tree

Guy Aldonce de Durfort with wife, parents, and other selected relatives. (Note: This family tree is based on the genealogy in)

Jacques; 1547-1626 | Henri de La Tour d'Auvergne; 1555–1623
Guy; Aldonce; 1605-1665 | Elisabeth de La Tour d'Auvergne; 1606-1685 | Turenne; 1611–1675; Marshal
Jacques; Henri; 1625–1704 | Guy; Aldonce; 1630–1702 | Geneviève de Frémont d'Auneuil; 1658–1727 | Jean- Antoine de Mesmes; 1661–1723
Marie; Gabrielle; 1678–1743 | Saint; Simon; 1675–1755; Writer | Geneviève; Chamillart; 1685-1714 | Guy; Nicolas; 1683–1758 | Marie- Anne- Antoinette de Mesmes; 1696–1757
Guy; Michel; 1704–1773 | Elisabeth- Philippine de Poitiers

| Legend |

| XXX | Subject of the article | XXX | Famous people | XXX | Duras; Branch | XXX | Lorges; Branch |

Guy was one of 12 siblings:

Guy listed among his siblings
He appears below among his siblings as the fourth child:
1. Jacques Henri (1625–1704), marquis de Duras;
2. Frédérique Maurice (1626–1693), called Rauzan;
3. Armand (1630–1631), twin brother of Guy Aldonce II, died of the pest in his infancy;
4. Guy Aldonce (1630–1702);
5. Louise-Madeleine, died young;
6. Elisabeth (1632–1715), married on 3 June 1656 Frédéric-Charles de La Rochefoucauld, comte de Roye;
7. Henriette (1633 – after 1667), married in 1653 Louis de Bourbon-Lavedan, marquis de Malauze;
8. Charles Henri (1634–1661), comte de Montgommery;
9. Louis (1641–1709), marquis de Blanquefort, who became Earl of Feversham;
10. Charles-Louis (born 1642), baron de Pujols, killed in Portugal;
11. Godefroy (1644–1669), comte de Rozan, colonel of foot, fell at the Siege of Candia, Crete;
12. Marie (1648–1689), dame de compagnie of Elisabeth Charlotte, Madame Palatine, duchesse d'Orléans.

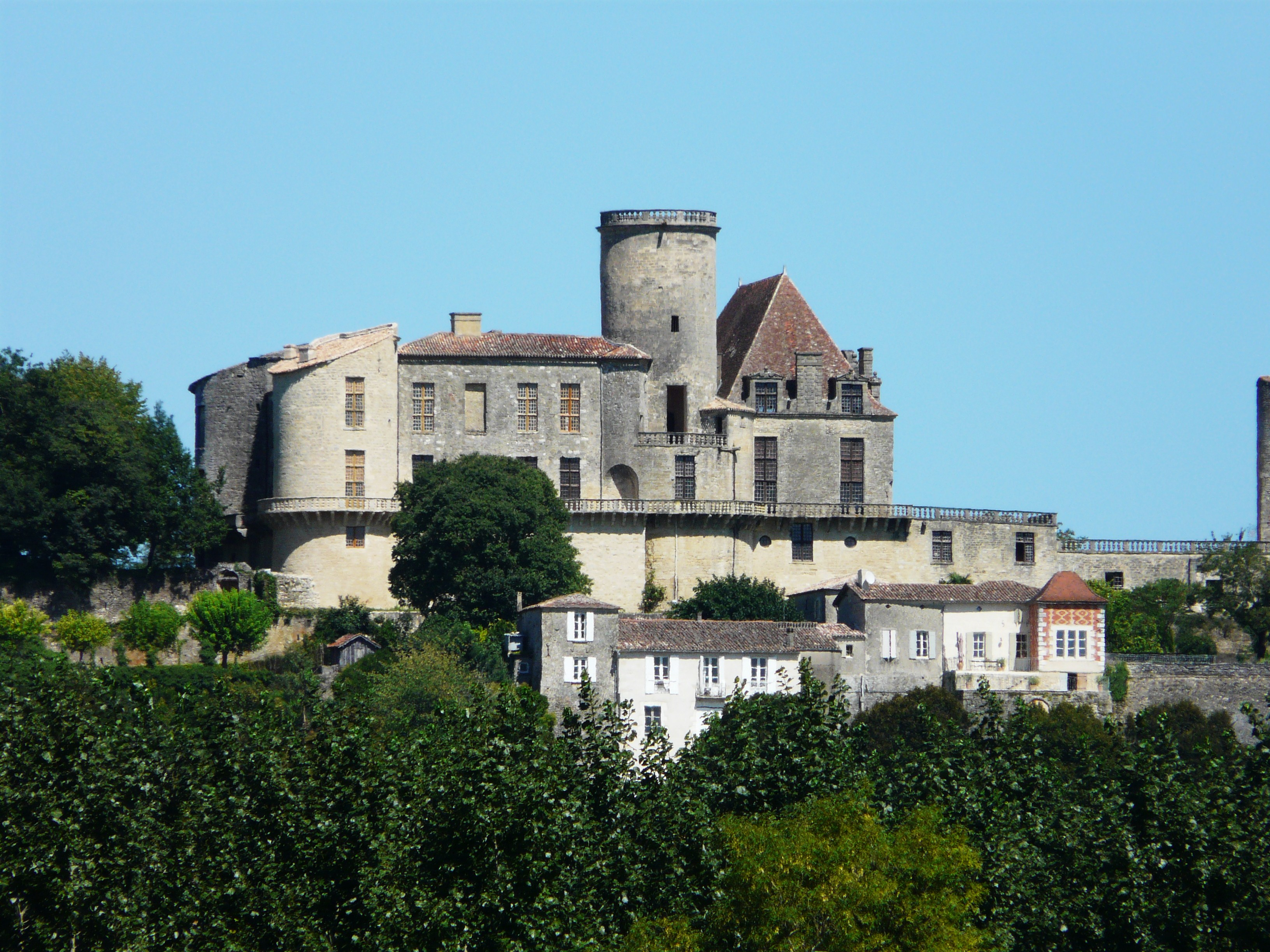
The Château de Duras where he was born.

== Franco-Dutch War ==
In the Franco-Dutch War (1672–1678) Lorges served mostly under Turenne in the French Rhine Army. However, in 1673 he was sent to Flanders with 7000 of Turenne's men to take part in the Siege of Maastricht. He was assigned the north-eastern sector before Wijck, the part of Maastricht that lies on the right bank of the Maas. The town, under the command of Jacques de Fariaux, surrendered on 30 June 1673.

Arms of the House of Durfort de Lorges

Back on the Rhine, Lorges probably participated in the devastation of the Palatinate by Turenne in 1674. On 4 October 1674 in the Battle of Entzheim, Lorges commanded the Brigade d'Humières and the Dragons de la Reine on the left wing. On 5 January 1675 he fought at the French victory of Turckheim where he commanded the right wing. When Turenne was killed at Sasbach on 27 July 1675, Lorges was lieutenant-general of the day, but marquis de Vaubrun was the most senior lieutenant-general. They agreed to alternate the command daily between them. The army retreated from Sasbach and fought the Battle of Altenheim, where Vaubrun, who commanded the rearguard, was killed on 1 August 1675. When Lorges arrived back in Alsace he was ordered to hand over the command of the Rhine army to his brother the Duke of Duras, who had come from the Franche-Comté for that purpose while waiting for the arrival of Condé from Flanders whom Louis XIV had appointed as commander of the Rhine Army. On 26 January 1679 France made peace with the Holy Roman Empire in the Treaties of Nijmegen ending the Franco-Dutch War.

== Marriage and children ==
On 19 March 1676 (date of the contract) Lorges married Geneviève de Frémont, daughter of the keeper of the King's jewels. Many of his friends considered that he had married socially beneath him, but the marriage was a happy one and even his son-in-law Saint-Simon, who disapproved of marriage between the classes, admitted that she was an admirable wife.

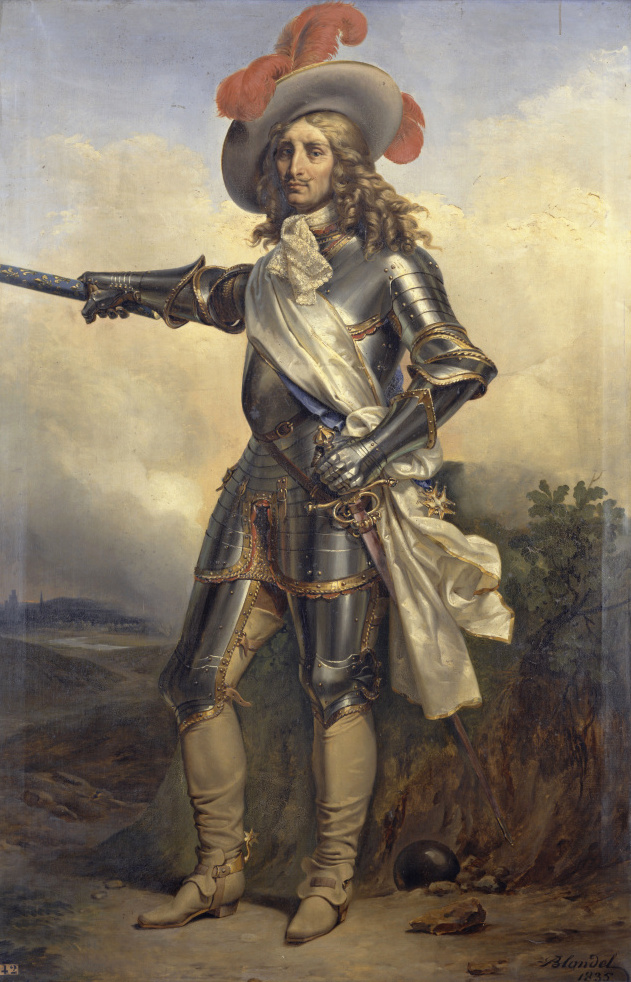
Lorges in a 19th-century painting

Guy Aldonce and Geneviève had one son and four daughters:

1. Marie Gabrielle (1678–1743), married Louis de Rouvroy, duc de Saint-Simon; (Note: Called Marie-Gabrielle in her act of marriage but Geneviève-Françoise by Anselme and by La Chesnaye.)
2. Geneviève (1680–1740), called "Mademoiselle de Quintin", who married Antoine Nompar de Caumont, duke of Lauzun;
3. Guy Nicolas (1683–1758), succeeded him as duc de Lorges;
4. Élisabeth Gabrielle (died 1727), abbess of Andecy; and
5. Claude Suzanne Thérèse (died 1745), abbess of Saint-Amand, Rouen.

Saint-Simon praised Lorges, his father-in-law, warmly in his Memoirs, describing him as highly principled, frank, upright, good-natured, sincere and the most truthful man alive. Lorges supplied his son-in-law with useful material for his memoirs, particularly on the early relations between Louis XIV and Madame de Maintenon.

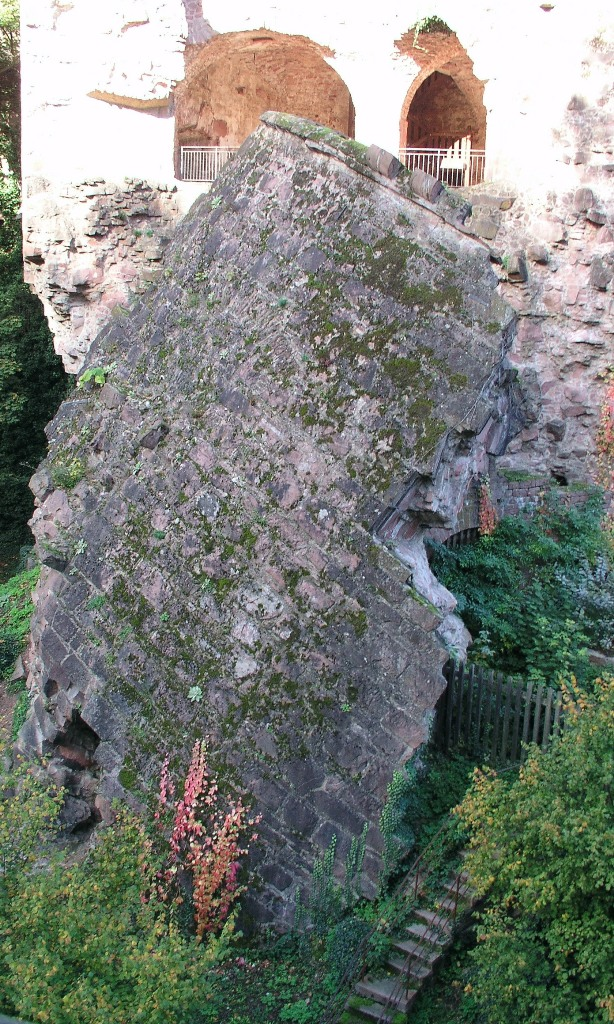
The Powder Tower of Heidelberg Castle, blown up and split by Lorge's troops in 1693.

== Nine Years' War ==
During the Nine Years' War (1688–1697), also called the War of the Grand Alliance, Lorges commanded the French army of the Rhine from 1690 to 1695. On 31 December 1688 in the Chapel of the Château de Versailles he was made a Knight of the Order of the Holy Spirit.

In 1691 Lorges was elevated by Louis XIV to duc de Quintin-Lorge.

On 27 September 1692, he surprised and routed 4,000 imperial cavalry under the command of Frederick Charles of Württemberg-Winnental in their camp at Ötisheim and took Württemberg prisoner.

On 22 May 1693 Lorges took the city of Heidelberg, then the capital of the Electoral Palatinate. The castle capitulated the next day. Johann Wilhelm, Elector Palatine, was also Duke of Jülich and Berg and resided at Düsseldorf. Heidelberg been burned by René de Froulay de Tessé in 1689 and the castle's Fat Tower had been blown up. Lorges now completed the destruction by burning the town and castle again. The commander des Bordes blew up many of the fortifications, notably the castle's Powder Tower, now known as the "Gesprengte Turm" (Blown-up Tower).

The campaign of 1694 was relatively uneventful for the Rhine Army. On 20 June 1695, Lorges fell ill and was temporarily replaced by Joyeuse as commander of the Rhine Army. Lorges's wife came from Paris and took him to Vichy so that he should take thermal baths there for his health. On 4 September Lorges returned to his post. In 1696 he was ill again and Marshal Choiseul was appointed in his place. On 30 October 1697 the Emperor signed the Peace of Ryswick ending the Nine Years' War.

== Death and timeline ==
On 22 October 1702 he died in Paris of a botched kidney-stone surgery; Guy died in agonising pain, which he endured with great courage. He was succeeded by his son Guy Nicolas, who would marry firstly Geneviève Chamillart (1685–1714) and then secondly in 1720 Marie Anne Antoinette de Mesmes (1696–1757), eldest daughter of Jean-Antoine de Mesmes, the premier président of the Parlement of Paris.

Timeline
| Age | Date | Event |
|---|---|---|
| 0 | 1630, 22 Aug | Born at the Château de Duras. |
| 34 | 1665, 8 Jan | Father died. |
| 42 | 1673, Jun | Fought at the Siege of Maastricht |
| 44 | 1675, 27 Jul | Was there at Sasbach where Turenne was killed |
| 45 | 1676, 19 Mar | Married Geneviève Frémont d'Auneuil |
| 48 | 1679, 26 Jan | The Franco-Dutch War ended with the Treaties of Nijmegen. |
| 58 | 1688, 31 Dec | Made a knight of the Order of the Holy Spirit. |
| 60 | 1691, 21 Mar | Created Duke of Quintin-Lorge |
| 62 | 1692, 27 Sep | Took Frederick Charles of Württemberg-Winnental prisoner. |
| 62 | 1693, 22 May | Captured the city of Heidelberg. |
| 67 | 1697, Oct | The Peace of Ryswick ended the Nine Years' War. |
| 72 | 1702, 22 Oct | Died in Paris during a kidney-stone surgery |

== Notes and references ==
=== Sources ===
- Anselme, Père (1730). Histoire généalogique et chronologique de la maison royale de France (in French). Vol. Tome cinquième (Troisième édition ed.). Paris: Compagnie des libraires associez. OCLC 831196124. – Dukes (for Durfort)
- Anselme, Père (1733). Histoire généalogique et chronologique de la maison royale de France (in French). Vol. Tome neuvième (Troisième édition ed.). Paris: Compagnie des libraires associez. OCLC 831196155. – Knights of the Order of the Holy Spirit and general index
- Cokayne, George Edward (1890). Complete Peerage of England, Scotland, Ireland, Great Britain and the United Kingdom, Extant, Extinct, or Dormant. Vol. III (1st ed.). London: George Bell and Sons. OCLC 1180838776. – D to F (for Feversham)
- Daniell, Francis Henry Blackburne, ed. (1907). Calendar of State Papers, Domestic Series, March 1st, 1675 to February 29th, 1676, Preserved in the Public Record Office. London: His/Her Majesty's Stationery Office. OCLC 1181376745. – 1675 to 1676
- Deschamps, Nicolas (1756). Mémoires des deux dernières campagnes de Monsieur de Turenne en Allemagne (in French). Paris: Charles-Antoine Jombert. OCLC 28046845.
- Kugler, Bernhard von (1878). "Friedrich Karl, Herzog von Württemberg-Winnenthal". In Liliencron, Rochus von (ed.). Allgemeine Deutsche Biographie (in German). Vol. Achter Band. Leipzig: Duncker & Humblot. pp. 50–52. OCLC 309922836.
- La Chesnaye des Bois, François Alexandre Aubert de (1865). Dictionnaire de la noblesse (in French). Vol. Tome septième (3rd ed.). Paris: Schlesinger Frères. OCLC 797014713. – DOU to FEV (for Durfort)
- Longueville, Thomas (1907). Marshal Turenne. London: Longmans, Green & Co. OCLC 665146146.
- Lynn, John A. (1999). The Wars of Louis XIV 1667–1714. Harlow, England: Longman. ISBN 978-0-582-05629-9.
- Metzger, Johann (1829). Beschreibung des Heidelberger Schlosses und Gartens [Description of Heidelberg Castle and Garden] (in German). Heidelberg: August Osswald. OCLC 165895832.
- Saint-Simon, Louis de Rouvroy, duc de (1967). Historical Memoirs of the Duc de Saint-Simon. Vol. I. Translated by Norton, Lucy. London: Hamish Hamilton. – 1691 to 1709
- Quincy, Charles Sevin de (1726a). Histoire militaire du règne de Louis le Grand [Military History of the Reign of Louis the Great] (in French). Vol. I. Paris: Denis Mariette. OCLC 23619104. – 1643 to 1681 (for the Siege of Maastricht)
- Quincy, Charles Sevin de (1726b). Histoire militaire du règne de Louis le Grand [Military History of the Reign of Louis the Great] (in French). Vol. II. Paris: Denis Mariette. OCLC 23619104. – 1681 to 1693
- Quincy, Charles Sevin de (1726c). Histoire militaire du règne de Louis le Grand [Military History of the Reign of Louis the Great] (in French). Vol. III. Paris: Denis Mariette. OCLC 312096140. – 1694 to 1702
- Saint-Simon, Louis de Rouvroy, duc de (1879a). Boislisle, Arthur de (ed.). Mémoires du duc de Saint-Simon (in French). Vol. Tome premier. Paris: Hachette. OCLC 1068033585. – 1691 to 1693
- Saint-Simon, Louis de Rouvroy, duc de (1879b). Boislisle, Arthur de (ed.). Mémoires du duc de Saint-Simon (in French). Vol. Tome second. Paris: Hachette. OCLC 1068033585. – 1694 to 1695
