= Battle of Salzbach =

1675 battle

- Part of Franco-Dutch War
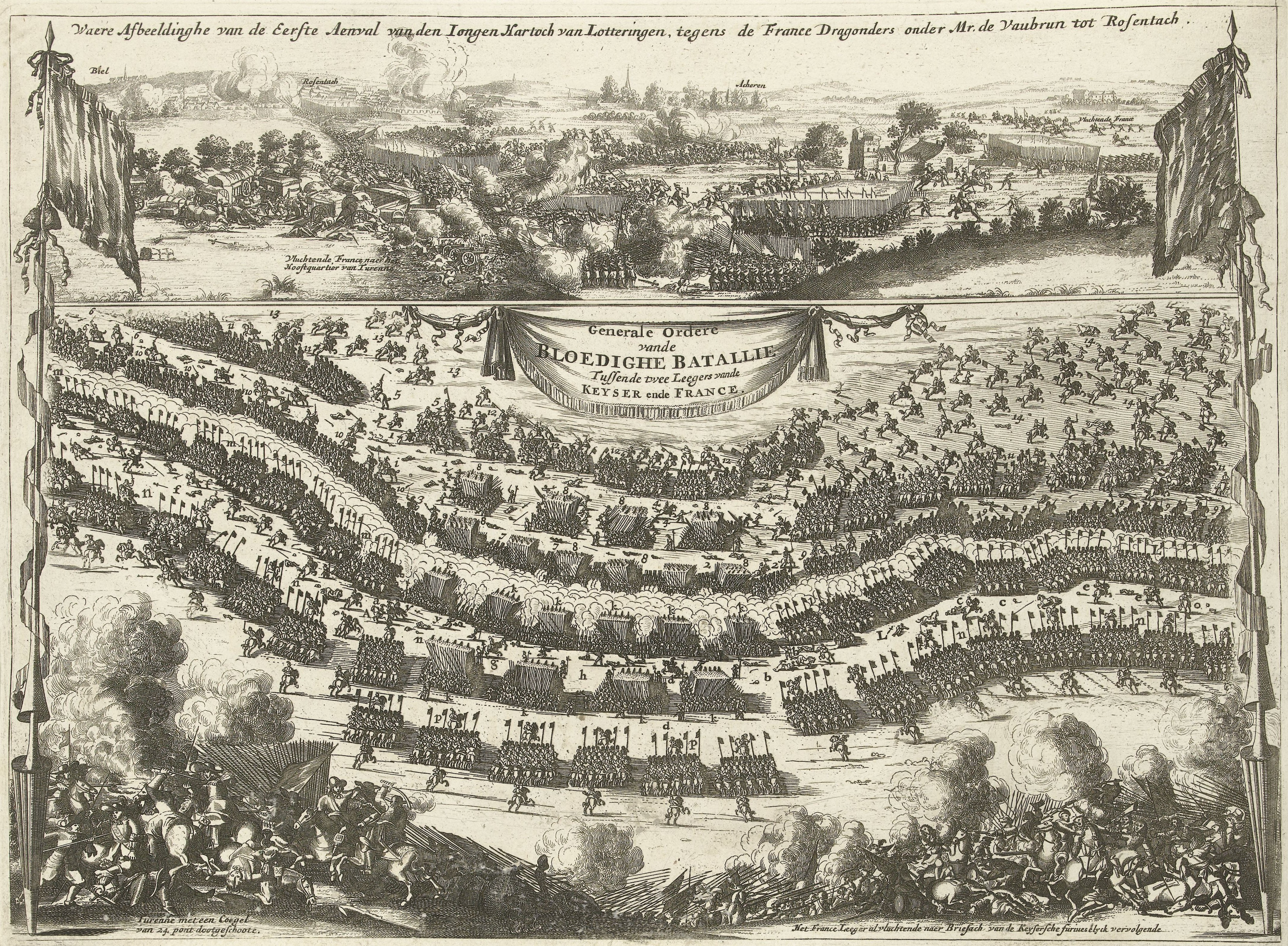
- Battle of Salzbach (c. 1675)
Date	27 July 1675
Location	Sasbach (Ortenau), present-day Germany
Result	Inconclusive

Belligerents
Holy Roman Empire	France

Commanders and leaders
(Holy Roman Empire) Raimondo Montecuccoli	(Kingdom of France) Turenne †

The Battle of Salzbach, or Sasbach, took place on 27 July 1675 during the Franco-Dutch War, when an Imperial army under Raimondo Montecuccoli confronted a French force commanded by Marshal Turenne. The "battle" consisted primarily of an artillery duel, during which Turenne was killed by a cannonball.

== Background ==
When the Franco-Dutch War began in May 1672, French troops quickly overran much of the Dutch Republic, helped by English naval support. By July the Dutch position had stabilised, while concern at French gains brought support from Brandenburg-Prussia, Emperor Leopold, and Charles II of Spain. In August 1673, an Imperial Army entered the Rhineland; facing war on multiple fronts, Louis XIV abandoned most of his gains in the Netherlands to focus elsewhere.

In January 1674, Denmark–Norway joined the anti-French coalition, while the February Treaty of Westminster ended the Third Anglo-Dutch War. After completing the reconquest of Franche-Comté in June, the main French army under Condé won a narrow victory over a combined Dutch-Spanish force under William of Orange at Seneffe in August. However, French losses were so high Condé was ordered to remain on the defensive.

French forces in Germany were led by Turenne; from 1673 to 1674, he won a series of victories over superior Imperial forces led by Alexander von Bournonville and Raimondo Montecuccoli, the one commander contemporaries viewed as equal to Turenne. The campaign that started in June 1674 and ended with his death in July 1675, has been described as 'possibly Turenne's most brilliant campaign.' Despite being significantly outnumbered, he fought Bournonville to a standstill at Entzheim in early October, then won a decisive victory at Turckheim in January 1675.

== 1675 campaign ==
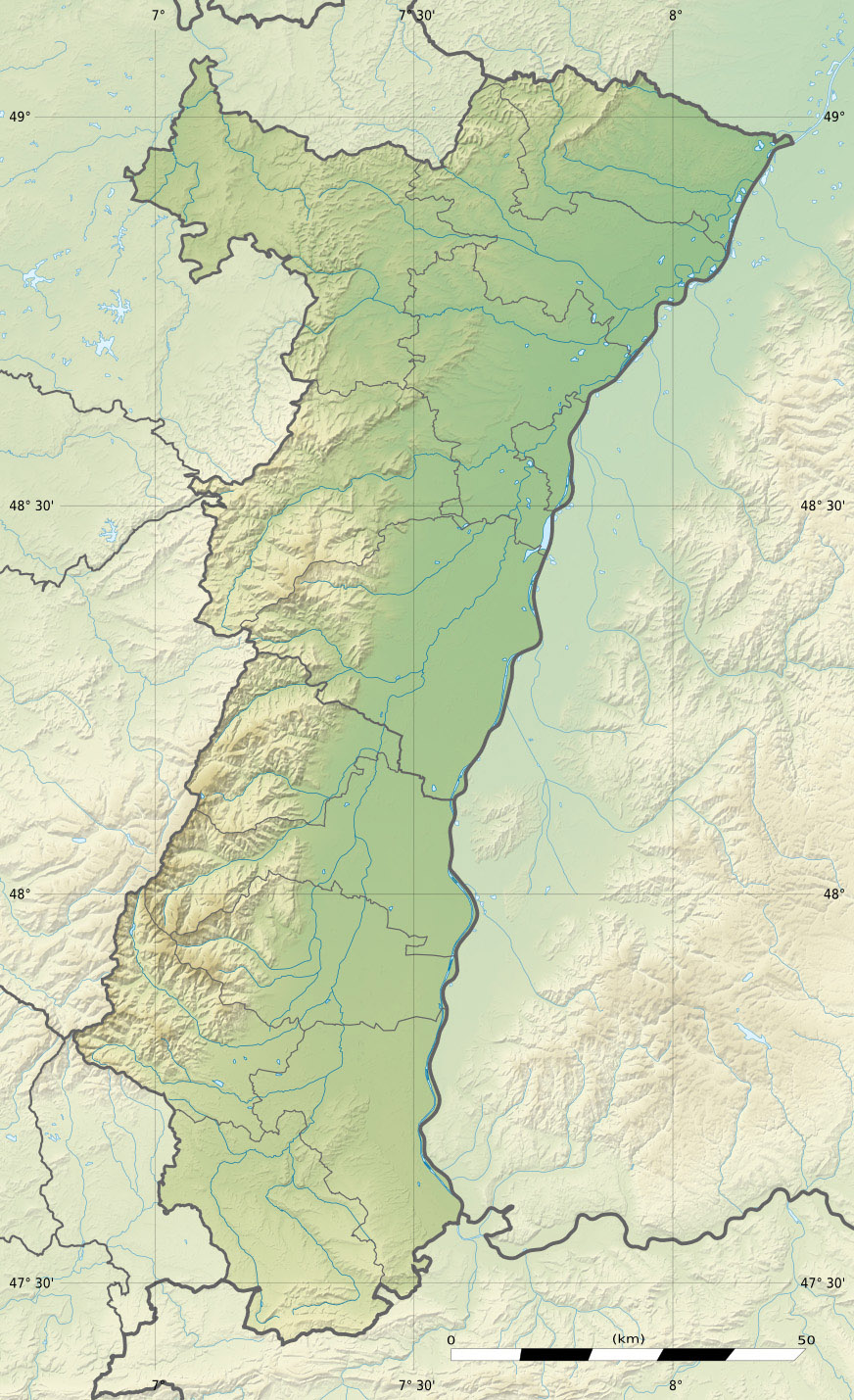
1675 Rhineland campaign; the modern French-German border runs along the Rhine (right)

After Bournonville's defeat, Montecuccoli took over command of the Imperial forces in southern Germany. He hoped to make up for the recent disaster by crossing the Rhine River at Strasbourg and re-occupying Alsace. In the spring of 1675, he marched west through the Black Forest into the Rhine valley. There, he gathered in the remnants of Bournonville's army, some 8,000 men. The Imperial army now numbered 18,000 foot and 14,000 horse. On 20 May Montecuccoli established his headquarters at Willstätt. At the same time, his scouts reached Kehl, the town on the east bank of the Rhine opposite Strasbourg.

As Montecuccoli approached the east bank of the Rhine, Turenne and his army—20,000 foot and 15,000 horse—moved to block the Imperials on the opposite bank. The French commander sent word to Strasbourg, then an independent city, demanding that the Imperial army not be allowed to use the city's bridge over the Rhine. However, unimpressed by Turenne's recent victory, Strasbourg favored the Empire. Not only did the city authorities permit Montecuccoli to cross on 22 May but they also supplied his headquarters with delicacies. For his part, the Imperial commander seemed intimidated by Turenne's approach. Although Montecuccoli crossed the Rhine, he did not bring his army with him. He made a pretense of moving troops to Kehl, but he and his army were soon marching north to attempt a crossing elsewhere.

On 31 May Montecuccoli crossed to the west bank of the Rhine near Speyer. However, his move was nothing more than a feint designed to draw Turenne north, away from Strasbourg; the Imperial army pulled back to the east bank on 4 June. Turenne was not taken in by the ruse. The French army began to build temporary bridges across the Rhine at Ottenheim south of Strasbourg on 6 June, and the French were across by 8 June. Now both armies were on the east bank. As Montecuccoli had done, Turenne chose Willstatt for his headquarters. The Imperial army hurried south to confront the French who now blocked the way to Kehl and Strasbourg. The Imperial advance guard, 4,000 men under Charles of Lorraine, attacked the French lines but was repelled.

Montecuccoli attempted another feint to draw Turenne away from Kehl. He marched around the French eastern flank, skirting the Black Forest, to occupy Offenburg. He sent troops even further south to threaten the French bridges at Ottenheim. Refusing to take the bait, Turenne merely pulled up his bridges and moved them north, closer to Willstatt. For a week, the two armies watched each other, neither side willing to bring on a general engagement. At last, lack of forage forced Montecuccoli to withdraw north to entrench his army along the Rench River, 10 miles from Strasbourg. He left 5,000 men under Count Aeneas de Caprara to hold Offenburg. In response, Turenne moved most of his army to face the new Imperial position while keeping a garrison in Willstatt.

Both sides suffered from supply problems and from the weather. French horses were reduced to eating leaves, and the troops suffered under continuous rain. While the armies marked time waiting for better weather, Turenne had a close call. Peasants fired on him and a party of French officers, killing a guard who stood near Turenne. The rain let up on 22 July and Turenne began a turning maneuver that sought to pin Montecuccoli against the Rench. The French vanguard attacked the Imperials at Gamshurst but was driven off. Montecuccoli attempted an attack of his own on 23–24 July, but this was hampered by fog. There was more fighting over the day and night of 25–26 July. Seeing no hope of victory along the Rench, Montecuccoli ordered a retreat to the Black Forest, instructing Caprara to abandon Offenburg and join the main Imperial army.

== Encounter at Salzbach ==
Turenne followed after the Imperials. By this time, attrition had reduced each army to an approximate strength of 25,000 men. On the morning of 27 July the French found the Imperial army entrenching around the village of Salzbach, behind a stream of the same name, on a small plain at the foot of the mountains. The Imperial baggage train could be seen moving into the pine forest beyond the village. Montecuccoli took advantage of hedges and woods in protecting his troops, and placed musketeers in the village church and an old castle on his right flank. The Imperial commander had to hold this position because he was waiting for Caprara to join him. This officer was slow in arriving, though, because the presence of the French army had forced him to take a long detour through the foothills.

The French army formed line of battle south of the Salzbach Stream, with infantry to the front and cavalry behind. Turenne sent Pierre de Mormez, Seigneur de Saint Hilaire, his lieutenant general of artillery, to determine how best to place the army's guns. French volunteers went forward to fire on the nearest houses of the village, and eight French cannon were brought up to bombard the church and castle. Part of the village caught fire, but the French artillery was not effective against the church and castle because the Imperials had erected field fortifications in the church yard and cemetery to protect the structures. Imperial cannon responded, and an artillery duel began. Turenne sent a dispatch to King Louis saying he planned to attack the Imperials if they began to retreat. The French marshal discussed the situation with his generals, seeming confident of success. The French could see much movement among the Imperial units, suggesting irresolution, and the enemy looked to be on the verge of withdrawing.

== Death of Turenne ==
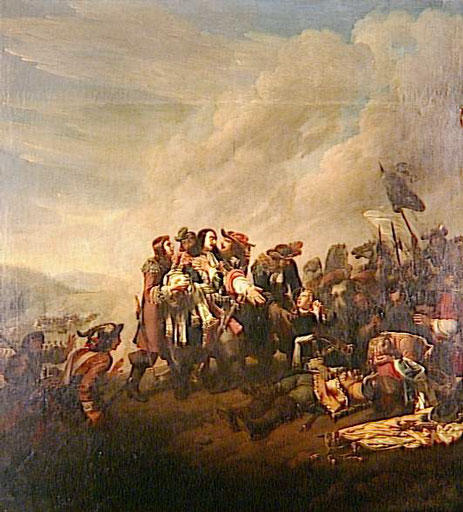
Death of Marshall Turenne

At about 2:00 p.m., Saint Hilaire asked Turenne to inspect a battery he was siting to suppress fire from Imperial guns commanded by Margrave Hermann of Baden-Baden. A staff officer urged caution because of the danger posed by the enemy's artillery fire. It has been suggested that the fire was especially hot because Saint Hilaire wore a red cloak, providing a good target. According to one source, Turenne agreed to be cautious, reportedly saying "je ne veux pas être tué aujourd'hui" ("I do not want to be killed today."). As the marshal and the general conferred, an Imperial cannonball hit them. It took off Saint Hilaire's left arm and passed through Turenne's body from shoulder to side. Turenne was able to take two steps before he fell, but he said nothing. Saint Hilaire survived, but Turenne was killed instantly.

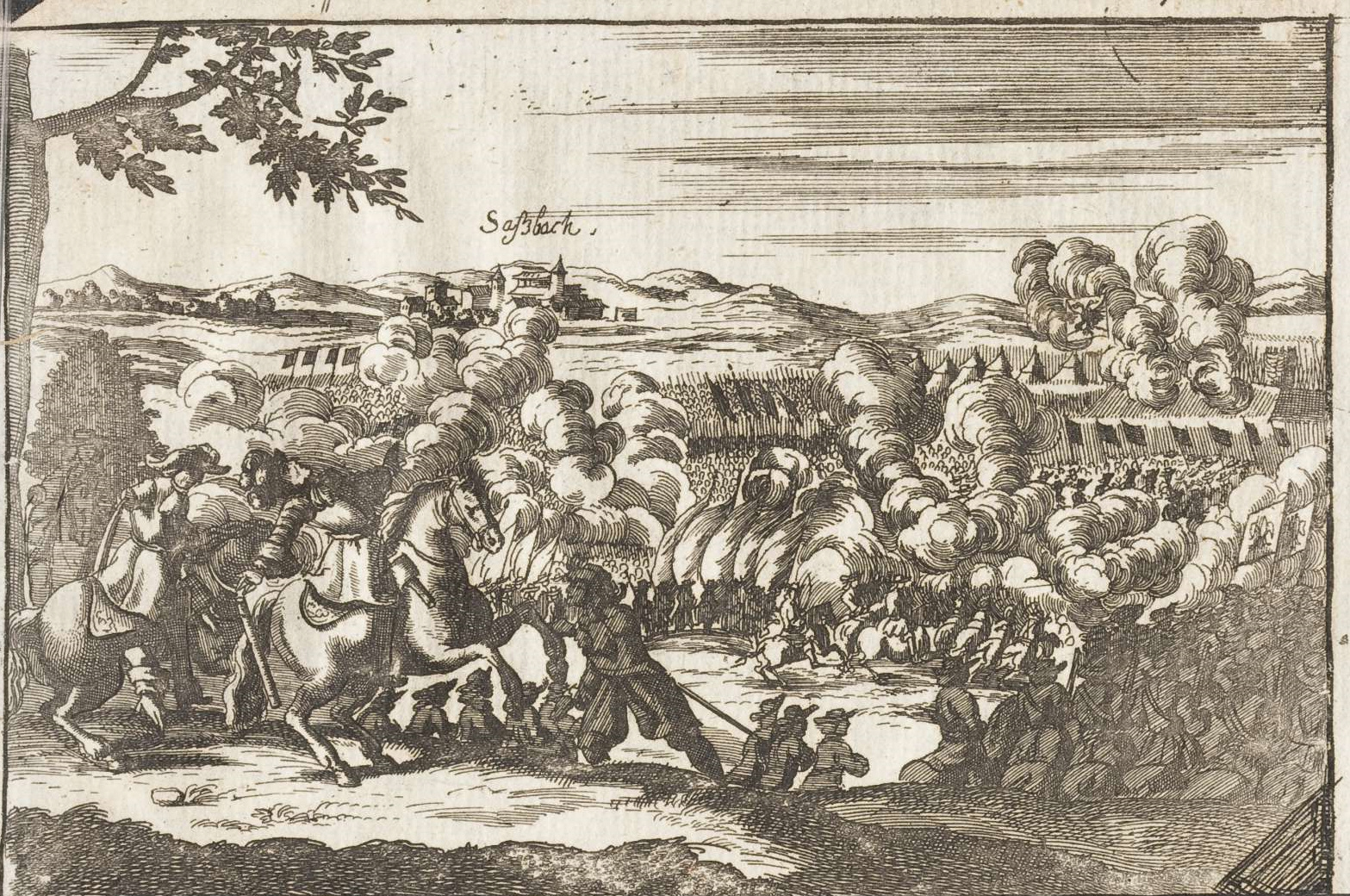
Turenne's death

At first, the French tried to hide the fact that their commander was dead. Meanwhile, Montecuccoli was expressing surprise that full-scale fighting had not yet begun by mid-afternoon. He soon learned of Turenne's death, possibly from a deserter. He is reported to have declared: "Today died a man who did honor to mankind."

== End and aftermath ==
As news of Turenne's death spread through the French army, there was grief, consternation, and anger. The soldiers, particularly the infantry, loved the old marshal. Some said: "Notre père est mort, mais il faut le venger." ("Our father is dead, but we must avenge him."). Guy Aldonce de Durfort de Lorges, the lieutenant general of the day (and Turenne's nephew), assumed command, although another officer disputed this for a time. The French cannons continued to fire. But soon it became clear that there would be no major battle. On the night of 29–30 July, the French army retreated in good order. A volunteer with the army stated later that Turenne's plan of campaign died with him, and that the generals who took over from him were considered worthy of reward merely for safely getting back across the Rhine to await orders from the royal court. Montecuccoli pressed hard on the French as they withdrew. It is not clear why he did not attack on 27 July as soon as he heard of Turenne's death. With his army disposed to defend against a blow from Turenne, he may not have considered it in a position to go over to the offensive. Once the French were in retreat, Montecuccoli felt strong enough to attack. He brought on a sharp fight at the Schutter River, but was unable to prevent the French from crossing into Alsace.

== Battlefield today ==
Turenne fell in what is now the small town of Sasbach, Germany. A monument stands near the site of Turenne's death, and the Turenne-Museum is nearby.

== Sources ==
- Anonymous (1732). A Relation or Journal of the Campaigns of the Marechal de Turenne, in the Years One Thousand Six Hundred Seventy Four, and One Thousand Six Hundred Seventy Five; 'Til the Time of His Death. Done from the French, By an Officer of the Army. Addison, Dublin.
- Brooks, Richard (2000). Atlas of World Military History. Barnes & Noble. ISBN 978-0760720257.
- Clodfelter, Micheal (2002). Warfare and Armed Conflicts: A Statistical Reference to Casualty and Other Figures 1500-1999. McFarland & Co. ISBN 978-0786412044.
- De Périni, Hardÿ (1896). Batailles françaises, Volume V (in French). Ernest Flammarion.
- Des Robert, Ferdinand (1903). Les Campagnes de Turenne en Allemagne d'apres des documents inedits (1672-1675) (in French) (2018 ed.). HACHETTE LIVRE-BNF. ISBN 978-2329018423.
- Guthrie, William (2003). The Later Thirty Years War: From the Battle of Wittstock to the Treaty of Westphalia (Contributions in Military Studies). Praeger. ISBN 978-0313324086.
- Hutton, Ronald (1989). Charles II King of England, Scotland and Ireland. Clarendon Press. ISBN 978-0198229117.
- La Chesnaye-Desbois, Francois Alexandre Aubert de (1761). Dictionnaire Genealogique, Heraldique, Historique et Chronologique Volume V (in French). Duchesne.
- Lynn, John A. (1999). The Wars of Louis XIV, 1667–1714. Addison Wesley Longman. ISBN 978-0582056299.
- Lynn, John A. (1997). Giant of the Grand Siecle: The French Army 1610-1715. Cambridge University Press. ISBN 978-0521572736.
- Ward, Laura (2004). Famous Last Words: The Ultimate Collection of Finales and Farewells. PRC Publishing Limited.
