= Jacques Henri de Durfort, 1st Duke of Duras =

Marshal of France (1625–1704)

Jacques Henri de Durfort
- 1st Duke of Duras
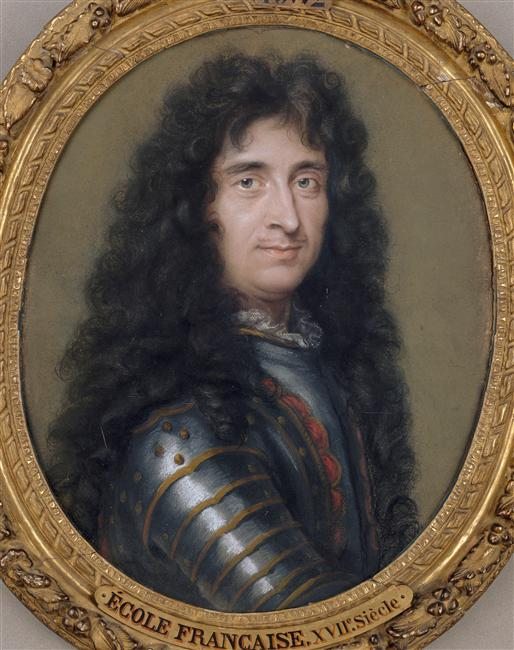
- Born: 9 October 1625; Duras, France
- Died: 12 October 1704 (aged 79); Paris, France
- Spouse: Marguerite Félice de Lévis
- Father: Guy Aldonce de Durfort
- Mother: Élisabeth de La Tour d'Auvergne
- Military career
- Allegiance: Kingdom of France
- Rank: Marshal of France
- Wars: Thirty Years' War; Fronde; Nine Years' War; Franco-Spanish War
- Awards: Order of Saint Louis; Order of the Holy Spirit; Order of Saint Michael

Jacques Henri de Durfort, 1st Duke of Duras (9 October 1625 – 12 October 1704) was Marshal of France.

== Early life ==
Jacques Henri was the oldest son of Guy Aldonce de Durfort (1605–1665), Marquis of Duras, Count of Rauzan and of Lorges, maréchal de camp; and of Élisabeth de La Tour d'Auvergne, sister of Henri de La Tour d'Auvergne, Viscount of Turenne. Just like him and his younger brother, Guy Aldonce de Durfort de Lorges, he converted to Catholicism shortly after his uncle.

== Career ==
His brother, Guy Aldonce de Durfort de Lorges, was also a Marshal of France. He served first under his uncle, Turenne, and under Condé. He distinguished himself at Mergentheim and Alerheim.

In 1651, he followed Condé into rebellion but came back into the service of the king in 1657, with the title of lieutenant-general. He played a major part in the conquest of Franche-Comté and was named by Louis XIV governor of that province and marshal in 1675. In 1689, he took part in the destruction of the Palatinate during the War of the Grand Alliance.

The Duc de Saint-Simon, who married his niece, speaks highly of him in his memoirs and notes that he was in such favour with Louis XIV that he "could more or less say what he pleased".

=== Personal ===
The Duke married Marguerite Félice de Lévis, daughter of Charles de Lévis, Duke of Ventadour and Marie de La Guiche. His wife was the sister-in-law of Charlotte de La Mothe Houdancourt, and aunt of the Duchess of Rohan-Rohan. Together, they were the parents of at least four children, including:

- Jacques Henri II of Durfort, 2nd Duke of Duras (1670–1697);
- Felice Armande de Durfort (1672–1730), married Paul Jules de La Porte, Duke Mazarin, son of Armand Charles de La Porte de La Meilleraye and Hortense Mancini;
- Louise Bernardine de Durfort (1675–1703), married Jean-François Paul de Blanchefort-Créquy (1678–1703), 5th Duke of Lesdiguières, Comte de Sault, Pair de France;
- Jean-Baptiste de Durfort, 3rd Duke of Duras (1684–1770), Marshal of France.
