= Philippe Henri, Comte de Grimoard =

Philippe Henri, comte de Grimoard (1753–1815) was a French soldier and military writer.

He entered the royal army at the age of sixteen, and in 1775 published his Essai théorique et practique sur les batailles. Shortly afterwards Louis XVI placed him in his own military cabinet and employed him especially in connection with schemes of army reform. By the start of the Revolution he had become one of Louis's most valued counsellors, in political as well as military matters, and was marked out, though only a colonel, as the next Minister of War.

In 1791 Grimoard was entrusted with the preparation of the scheme of defence for France, which proved two years later of great assistance to the Committee of Public Safety. The events of 1792 put an end to his military career, and the remainder of his life was spent in writing military books.

The following works by him, besides his first essay, have retained some importance:

- Histoire des dernières campagnes de Turenne (Paris, 1780)
- Lettres et mémoires de Turenne (Paris, 1780)
- Troupes legeres et leur emploi (Paris, 1782)
- Conquétes de Gustave-Adolphe (Stockholm and Neufchatel, 1782–1791)
- Memoires de Gustave-Adolphe (Paris, 1790)
- Correspondence of Marshal Richelieu (Paris, 1789)
- St Germain (1789)
- cand Bernis (1790)
- Vie et régne de Frédéric le Grand (London, 1788)
- Lettres et mémoires du maréchal de Saxe (Paris, 1794)
- L'Expédition de Minorque en 1756 (Paris, 1798)
- Recherches sur la force de l'armée française depuis Henri IV jusqu'en 1805 (Paris, 1806)
- Mémoires du maréchal de Tess (Paris, 1806)
- Lettres de Bolingbroke (Paris, 1808)
- Traité sur le service d'état-major (Paris, 1809)
- (with Servan) Tableau historique de la guerre de la Revolution 1792-1794 (Paris, 1808).
