= Jean-Armand de Joyeuse, Marquis de Grandpré =

French general

The Marquis de Grandpré
- Born: Jean-Armand de Joyeuse; 1631
- Died: 1 July 1710 (aged 78–79)
- Spouse: Marguerite de Joyeuse

Jean-Armand de Joyeuse (1631 – 1 July 1710), Marquis de Grandpré and Baron de Verpel, was a soldier and Marshal of France during the seventeenth and early eighteenth centuries.

== Early life and career ==
Joyeuse was born to Antoine François de Joyeuse, comte de Grandpré, and Harriet de la Vieuville in 1631. He joined the army at a young age, his first battle being in 1648. Joyeuse fought in the Battle of Rethel in 1652, and in the Battle of Stenay two years later.

Joyeuse married his cousin, Marguerite de Joyeuse, the daughter of the Baron de Verpel. He inherited his uncle's title upon the baron's death.

== Later service ==
By the outbreak of the Nine Years' War in 1688, Joyeuse was a general in French service. In March 1693, as a result of his long service, he was made a Marshal of France. Joyeuse was given command of the French army's left wing during the 1693 battle of Neerwinden. During the battle, he was shot and wounded, ending his active military service.

After Neerwinden, Joyeuse was given the governorships of various cities, including Metz. He died in 1710, during the War of the Spanish Succession.
