= Daniel Abbot =

British colonel

- Military career
- Rank: Colonel
- Commands: New Model Army
- Conflicts: Cromwellian conquest of Ireland

Daniel Abbot (or Abbott fl. 1650s) was a colonel of a regiment of dragoons in the New Model Army who fought throughout the Cromwellian conquest of Ireland and settled in the country once the war was over.

== Biography ==
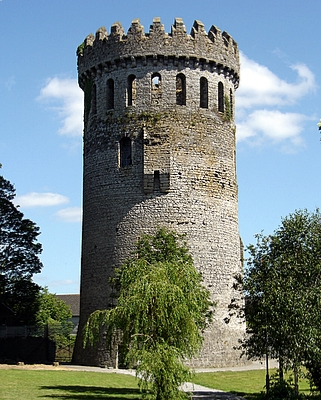
Nenagh Castle.

Daniel Abbot came to Ireland with Oliver Cromwell as colonel of a regiment of dragoons. He fought through the Cromwellian conquest of Ireland.

When the bulk of the army was disbanded in May 1653, he was chosen, along with Colonel Sadleir, Major Morgan and Vincent Gookin as the Trustees to carry out the assigning confiscated lands to the army for arrears of pay. His own arrears were satisfied in the barony of Moyfenrath, but led to a legal dispute with Dr Henry Jones.

After capturing Nenagh Castle in 1650, Abbot was appointed the military governor of it and appears to have made it his main dwelling from then until the Restoration.

Abbot was the second member for the counties Tipperary and Waterford in the Second Protectorate Parliament, which sat from 17 September 1656 until 4 February 1658. On 16 November 1658, Abbot was knighted at Dublin Castle by Henry Cromwell; Lord Deputy of Ireland.

Abbot was suspected of being opposed to the Restoration and in 1663 he took part in Blood's Plot to upset the Government. A reward of £100 was offered for his apprehension, but he managed to escape.

== Family ==
Abbot married a daughter of Thomas Sadleir (who was Lieutenant-General and Adjutant of the Irish Brigade in 1647).
