= Château de Duras (France) =

Château in Nouvelle-Aquitaine, France

Coordinates: 44.677°N 0.179°E

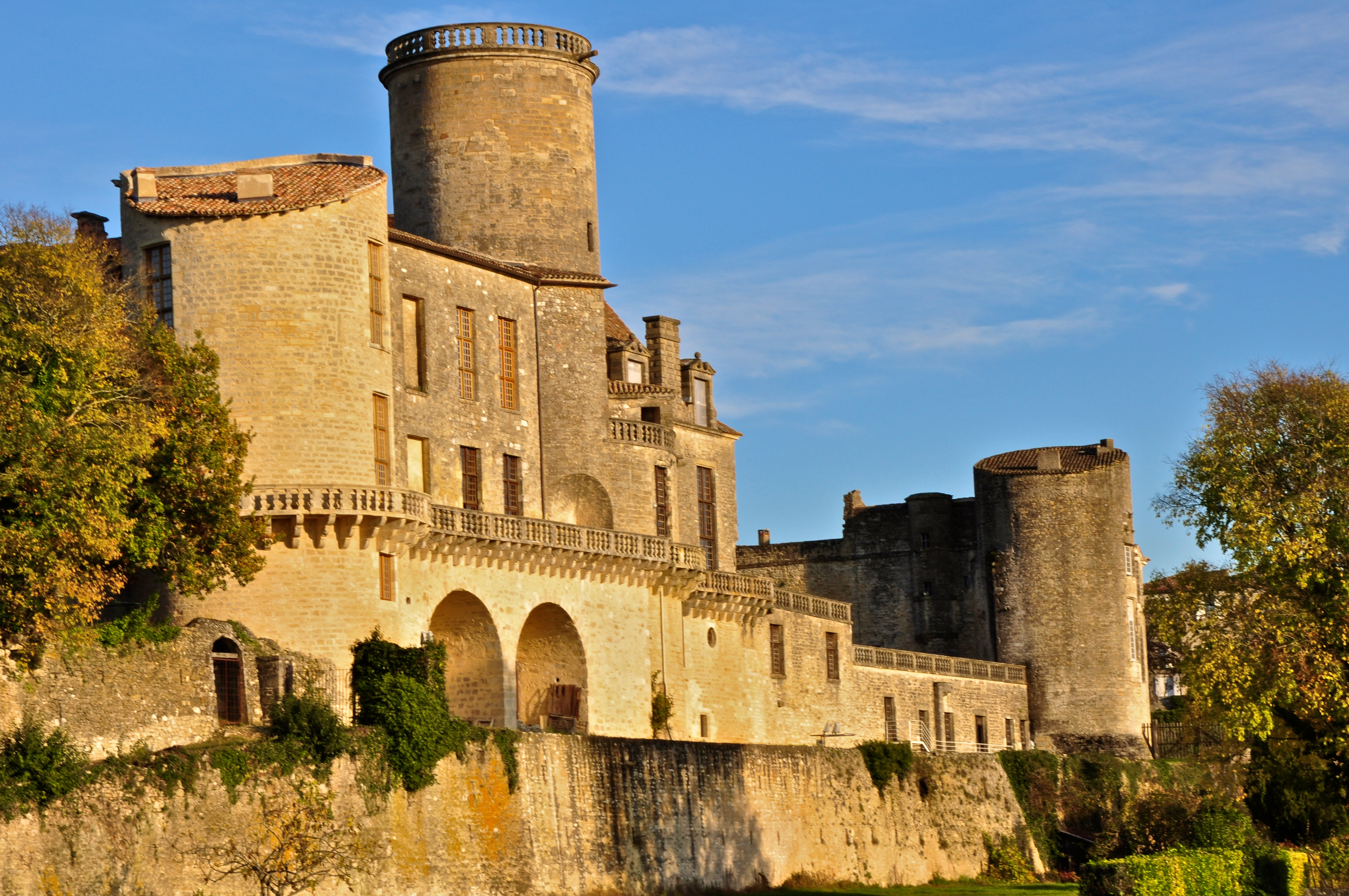
Château de Duras in 2009

Château de Duras is located in the town of Duras, in the department of Lot-et-Garonne, Nouvelle-Aquitaine, France. The castle was classified as a historic monument in 1970.

== History ==
The origin of the occupation of the site was the church of Saint-Ayrard (now demolished), which was located 1200m from the castle. The church was given in 977 to the Abbey of La Réole by Gombaud, Bishop of Vasconie and Guillaume, Duke of Gascony. In 1087, Bertrand de Taillecavat gave a quarter of the church of Saint-Ayrard to the abbey of La Réole. In 1127 the priory of Saint-Ayrard's villa is destroyed by the Viscount of Besamont. A house and a chapel was then built on the current site of the castle. A charter of 1233 attributed to the prior of La Réole the rights to the city of Duras, as he owned the priory of Saint-Ayrard. The charter is signed by Geraud de Malemort, Archbishop of Bordeaux, Raymond, Bishop of Agen and Guillaume de Bouville, Lord of Duras.

The first castle of Duras dates from the 12th century and was built on a rocky outcrop overlooking the Dropt valley. The castle belonged to the family of Bouville. The castle was captured in 1254, from the Viscounts of Benauges and Bezaume by King Henry III of England after a revolt of the Gascon lords. He passed the castle to his son, the future Edward I.
