= Battle of Entzheim =

Battle on 4 October 1674 near Entzheim during the Franco-Dutch War

Coordinates: 48.5353°N 7.6381°E

- Part of Franco-Dutch War
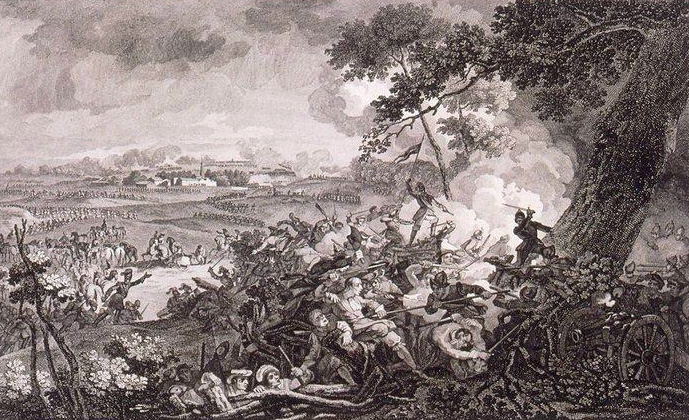
- Battle of Enzheim (Martinet ill.; E. Ruhierre graveur.)
Date	4 October 1674
Location	Entzheim France
Result	See Aftermath

Belligerents
France	Holy Roman Empire

Commanders and leaders
(Kingdom of France) Turenne (Kingdom of France) Marquis de Vauban (Kingdom of France) de Lorges (Kingdom of France) George Hamilton	(Holy Roman Empire) Bournonville (Holy Roman Empire) de Caprara (Holy Roman Empire) Prince de Holstein; Duke of Lorraine

Strength
22,000 men 30 guns	35,000–38,000 men 50 guns

Casualties and losses
2,500–3,500 killed or wounded	3,000 dead 4,000 killed or wounded 8–10 guns

The Battle of Entzheim (Note: Also known as Enzheim, or Ensheim) took place on 4 October 1674, during the 1672 to 1678 Franco-Dutch War. It was fought near the town of Entzheim, south of Strasbourg in Alsace, between a French army under Turenne, and an Imperial force commanded by Alexander von Bournonville.

In this campaign, Turenne compensated for being outnumbered by his aggression and vastly superior logistics, which allowed him to move fast and keep his opponents off balance. Despite a strong defensive position and vastly superior numbers, Bournonville decided to retreat after a series of French assaults.

Although Turenne incurred losses that were significantly higher as a percentage of his army, he prevented Bournonville invading Eastern France and the battle is generally regarded as inconclusive. However, the French established a psychological advantage, setting the scene for Turenne's Winter Campaign, often viewed as his greatest military achievement.

== Background ==
Both France and the Dutch Republic viewed the Spanish Netherlands as essential for their security and trade, making it a contested area throughout the 17th century. Large parts of it were occupied by French troops in the 1667 to 1668 War of Devolution, before Louis XIV of France was obliged to return it to Spain in the 1668 Treaty of Aix-la-Chapelle. After this, Louis decided the best way to force the Dutch to agree territorial concessions in the Spanish Netherlands was by first defeating them.

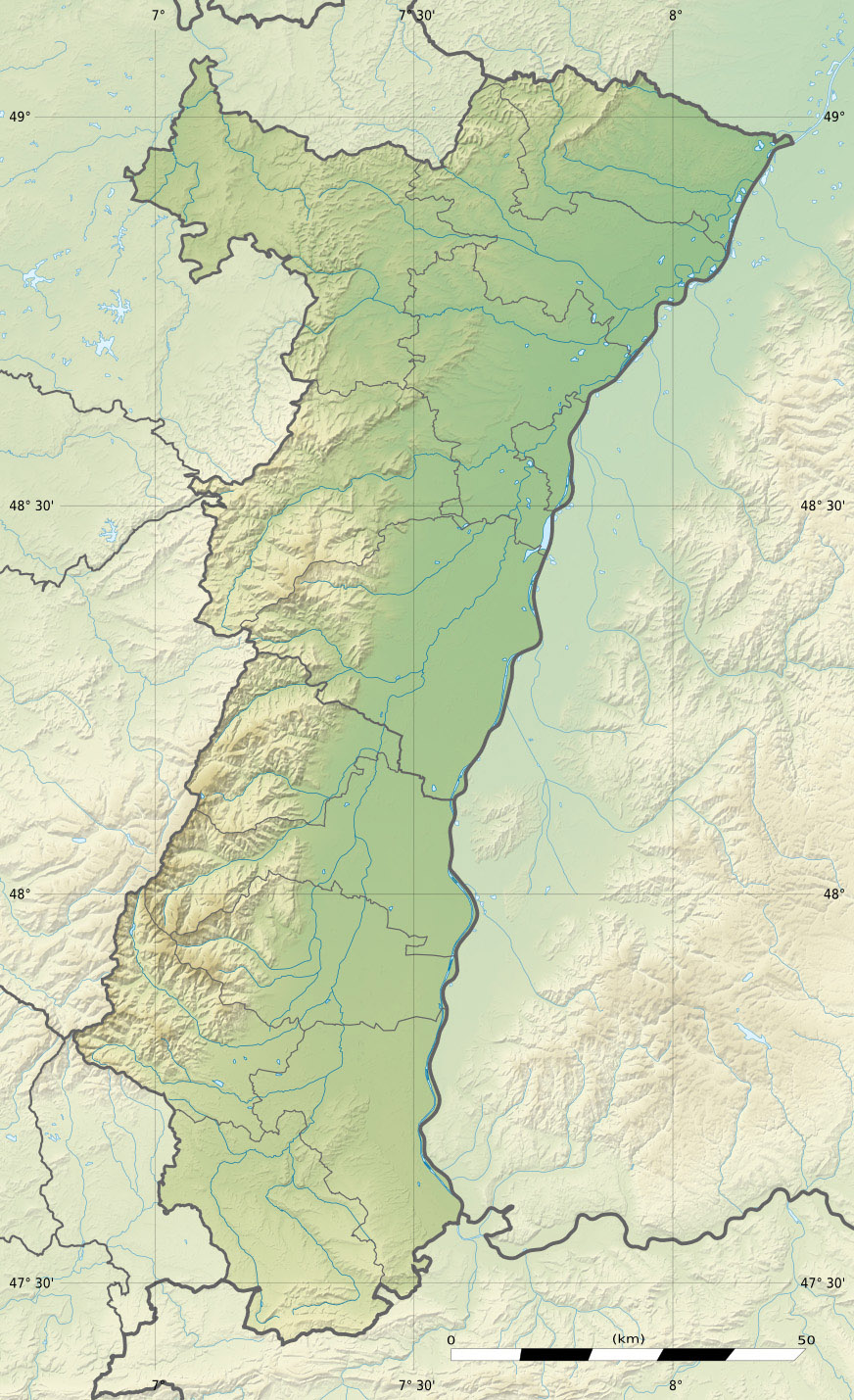
The 1674 campaign in Alsace; the modern French-German border runs along the Rhine (right)

At the outset of the Franco-Dutch War in May 1672, French troops quickly over-ran much of the Republic, but by July the Dutch position had stabilised. In addition, the unexpected success of his offensive encouraged Louis to make excessive demands, while concern at French gains brought the Dutch support from Brandenburg-Prussia, Emperor Leopold, and Charles II of Spain. In August 1673, the French army in the Rhineland under Turenne was faced by Imperial forces under Raimondo Montecuccoli who outmanoeuvred his opponent and helped the Dutch capture Bonn. Now facing war on multiple fronts, Louis relinquished most of his earlier gains to consolidate his position along the French border with the Spanish Netherlands and in the Rhineland.

In January 1674, Denmark joined the anti-French coalition, followed by the February Treaty of Westminster, which ended the Third Anglo-Dutch War. The allies agreed to focus on expelling France from its remaining positions in the Netherlands, while an Imperial army opened a second front in Alsace. Louis appointed Turenne commander in Alsace and ordered him to prevent the Imperials breaking into Eastern France, or linking up with the Dutch. Since he could not expect reinforcements, the longer Turenne delayed the worse his position became, and so he decided to take the offensive. He was helped in this since French armies of the period held significant advantages over their opponents; undivided command, talented generals, and vastly superior logistics. Reforms introduced by Secretary of War Louvois, meant they could mobilise quicker than their adversaries, and remain in the field longer.

This meant Turenne could attack his opponents one by one, and at Sinsheim on 16 June, he inflicted heavy casualties on a detachment under Aeneas de Caprara, although he was unable to prevent him linking up with Bournonville. In August 1674, the French and Dutch fought an inconclusive but bloody battle at Seneffe in Flanders. In early September, 40,000 Imperial troops under Bournonville and Caprara entered Alsace by crossing the Rhine at Strasbourg, then part of the Holy Roman Empire. Bournonville moved onto Entzheim to await another 20,000 troops led by Frederick William, Elector of Brandenburg, which would give him a combined force large enough to overwhelm the French. On the night of 2-3 October, Turenne left Molsheim, crossed the Bruche River, and arrived at Entzheim early on the morning of 4 October. The speed of his movement took Bournonville by surprise and cut him off from Strasbourg.

== Battle ==
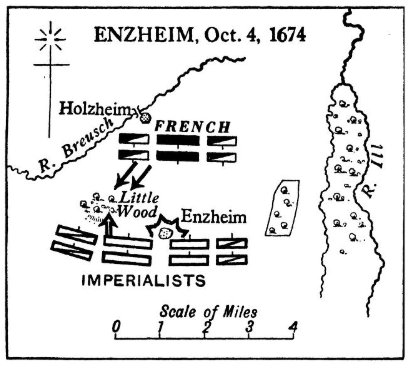
Battle map

Bournonville significantly outnumbered his opponent, with 35,000 men, half of which were cavalry, and 50 guns. Despite this, he decided to fight a defensive battle since Turenne had to attack immediately, or risk being caught between the Imperials and Fredrick William, while rain and mist meant conditions favoured the defenders. Most of his infantry was in the centre, anchored on Entzheim, supported by cavalry under Charles of Lorraine. On the right, his troops were hidden from view by meadows and vineyards, leading into the Foret de Bruche. His left was protected by a ditch, running from the village to the 'Little Wood', slightly in front of his position (see Map).

The cavalry was split evenly between the two wings; the right included the elite Imperial Cuirassiers under Caprara, with the German states units commanded by the Prince de Holstein-Ploen on the left. The 'Little Wood' was key to the Imperial position, since it had to be taken in order to attack Entzheim; aware of this, Holstein-Ploen placed eight guns and six battalions of infantry in the wood itself, with another eight in reserve immediately behind.

Turenne formed his army into two lines, infantry in the centre, and cavalry on the wings, the right commanded by the Marquis de Vaubrun, the left by his nephew, Guy Aldonce de Durfort de Lorges. He stationed the grenadier companies of his infantry regiments in the gaps between his cavalry squadrons, a tactic copied from Gustavus Adolphus. His artillery was placed in front of the infantry, in four batteries of eight guns. The second line and reserve included four English regiments, known as the British Brigade, commanded by Irish Catholic George Hamilton; one of its regiments was led by John Churchill, later Duke of Marlborough. Although England had left the war, they had been encouraged to remain in French service to ensure Charles II would still be paid for them, as agreed in the 1670 Secret Treaty of Dover with Louis.

Around 10:00 am, the French attacked the Little Wood with eight battalions of infantry, and dragoons under Louis Francois de Boufflers, a future Marshall of France. After the first assault was repulsed, they tried again, supported by four battalions from the second line, including the one commanded by Churchill. Holstein-Ploen responded by sending reinforcements from the reserve behind the wood, while heavy rain and mud impeded the French artillery as it tried to move forward; after two hours of back and forth combat, the French pulled back with heavy losses.

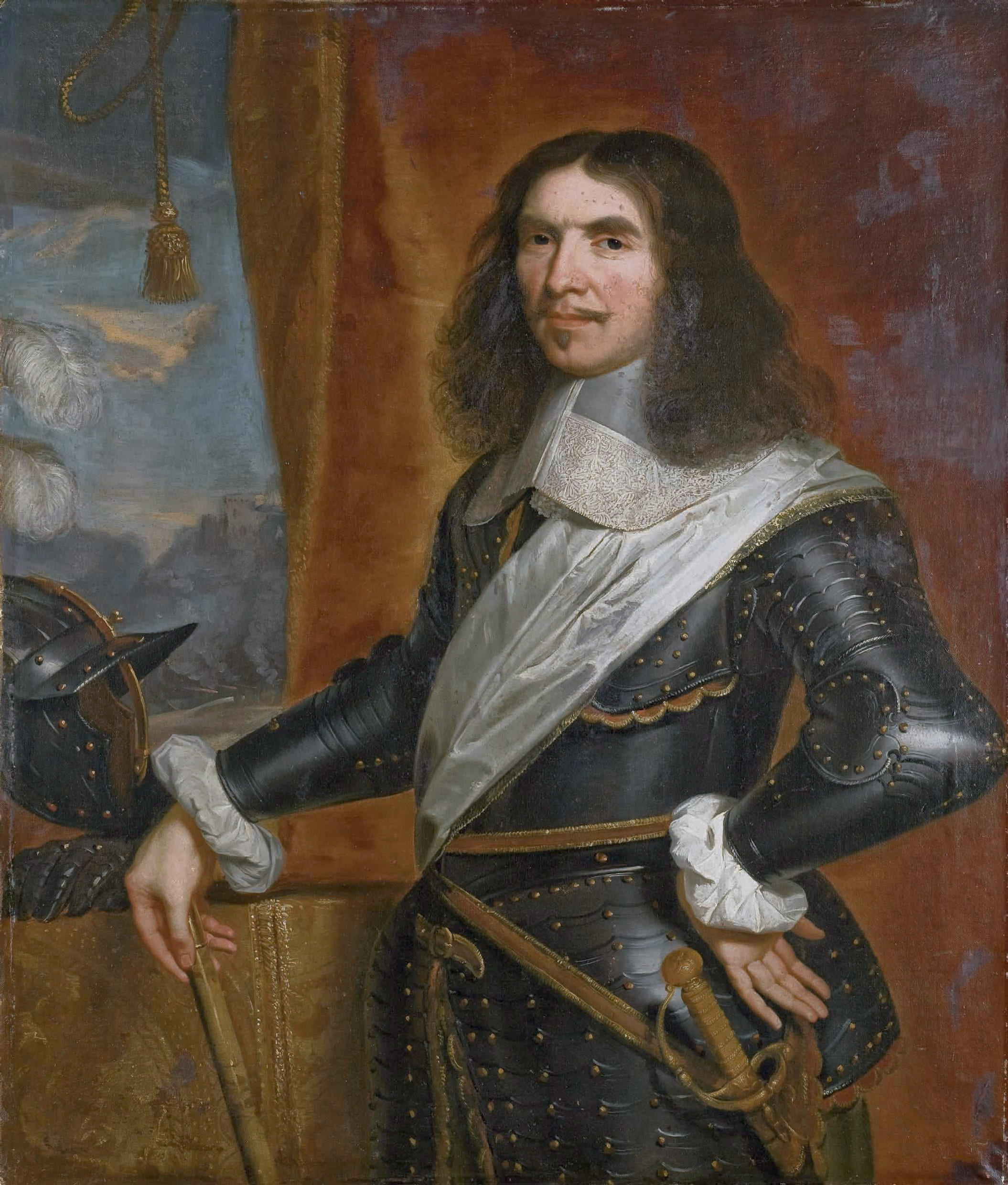
French commander, Vicomte de Turenne

Of the two English units involved, one lost 11 of 22 officers, the other all its officers and over half their men; Churchill later criticised Turenne's deployment. Rather than another frontal attack, Vaubrun's cavalry tried to move around the Little Wood and take the defenders in the rear, but were repulsed by Holstein-Ploen. Simultaneously, the heavily armed cuirassiers over-ran the French left, and the battle hung in the balance; however, the wet ground blunted the Austrian charge, and they quickly lost formation, allowing de Lorges to rally his troops, and force them back to the starting line.

Meanwhile, a third assault by the rest of Hamilton's British brigade, plus those of Puisieux and Réveillon, finally captured the Little Wood, threatening the Imperial left. After an unsuccessful attack by Vaubrun on the troops entrenched around Entzheim, Turenne ended the assaults, instead bombarding them with his artillery. By now, it was getting dark, and both sides were exhausted; having lost between 3,000 - 4,000 men, Bournonville ordered a retreat. The French had been marching or fighting for 40 hours non-stop, and their losses were about the same; aware they were incapable of making another attack, Turenne withdrew, leaving a small force of cavalry behind so that he could claim victory.

== Aftermath ==
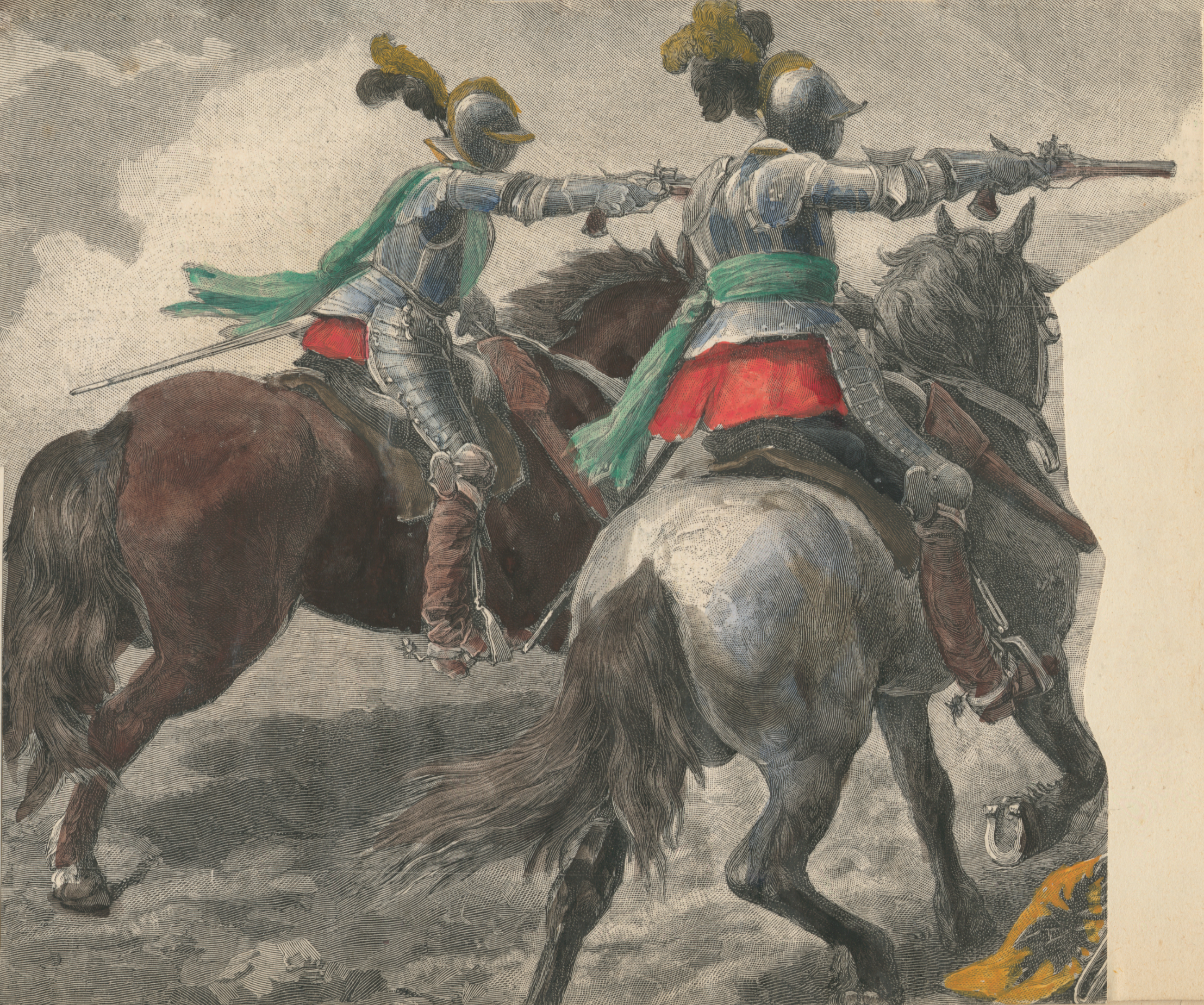
Austrian Cuirassiers, similar to those present at Entzheim; while heavily armoured, they were extremely expensive and relatively immobile

Bournonville entered winter quarters near Colmar, but Turenne did not pursue him; his own losses were around 3,500 men, many incurred by the British brigade, which was disbanded. He took his army north to Dettwiller between Saverne and Haguenau, where his exhausted troops could rest and refit. One modern commentator suggests Entzheim was a tactical draw, but strategic French victory, since the Imperials had been prevented from breaking into Eastern France.

British losses at Entzheim, combined with restrictions imposed on recruiting by Parliament, reduced its numbers from a nominal 4,000 to less than 1,400. Churchill and other senior officers left for England, and in May 1675, Parliament ordered any men still in France to return home. The exception was Hamilton's regiment, which was primarily composed of Irish Catholics like himself and remained in French service throughout the war. His officers included Patrick Sarsfield, a senior Jacobite commander during the 1689 to 1691 Williamite War in Ireland, who was killed at Landen in 1693.

The campaign that started in June 1674 and ended with his death in July 1675 has been described as 'Turenne's most brilliant campaign.' Significantly outnumbered, he used stealth and boldness to fight the Imperial army to a standstill at Entzheim; with his enemy now inactive, he was able to plan the winter movement that would culminate in decisive victory at the Battle of Turckheim.

The village of Entzheim still exists, but most of the battlefield now lies beneath Strasbourg International Airport.

== Sources ==
- Atkinson, Christopher Thomas (1946). "Charles II's regiments in France, 1672–1678: Part III". Journal of the Society for Army Historical Research. 24 (100): 161–172. JSTOR 44228420.
- Black, Jeremy (2011). Beyond the Military Revolution: War in the Seventeenth Century World. Palgrave Macmillan. ISBN 978-0230251564.
- Bodart, Gaston (1908). Militär-historisches Kriegs-Lexikon (1618-1905).
- Chandler, David G (1979). Marlborough as Military Commander (2nd, illustrated ed.). Batsford. ISBN 978-0713420753.
- Clodfelter, Micheal (2008). Warfare and Armed Conflicts: A Statistical Reference to Casualty and Other Figures, 1494-2007 (3rd ed.). McFarland & Co. ISBN 978-0-7864-3319-3.
- De Sévigné, Marie Rabutin-Chantal (1822). De St-Germain, Pierre Marie Gault (ed.). Letters of Madame De Sévigné, Volume III; to the Count de Bussy, 5 September 1674.
- Grimoard, Philippe-Henri, comte de (1782). Histoire Des Quatre Dernieres Campagnes Du Maréchal de Turenne en 1672, 1673, 1674, 1675. De Baurain. p. 129.
- Holmes, Richard (2008). Marlborough: Britain's Greatest General: England's Fragile Genius. Harper Press. ISBN 978-0007225712.
- Hutton, Ronald (1989). Charles II King of England, Scotland and Ireland. Clarendon Press. ISBN 978-0198229117.
- Kenyon, John Philipps (1986). The History Men: The Historical Profession in England since the Renaissance. Weidenfeld & Nicolson.
- Longueville, Thomas (1907). Marshal Turenne. Longmans, Green.
- Lynn, John A. (1999). The Wars of Louis XIV, 1667–1714. Addison Wesley Longman. ISBN 978-0582056299.
- Macintosh, Claude Truman (1973). French Diplomacy during the War of Devolution, the Triple Alliance and the Treaty of Aix-la-Chapelle (PhD). Ohio State University.
- Périni, Edouard Hardÿ de (1894). Batailles françaises [French Battles] (in French). Vol. V: Louis XIV 1672 à 1700. Paris: Ernest Flammarion éditeur. OCLC 461402333.
- Rousset, Camille (1865). Histoire de Louvois et de son administration politique et militaire jusqu'à la paix de Nimègue (in French). Vol. 2. Paris: Didier & Cie.
- Sévigné, Marie Rabutin-Chantal de (1822). De St-Germain, Pierre Marie Gault (ed.). Letters of Madame De Sévigné, Volume III; to the Count de Bussy, 5 September 1674.
- Tucker, Spencer C. (2010). A Global Chronology of Conflict. Santa Barbara, California: ABC CLIO. ISBN 978-1-85109-667-1.
