= Alexander von Bournonville =

Flemish military commander

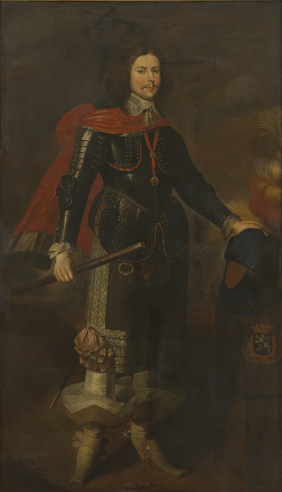
- Portrait of Alexander von Bournonville
- Born: January 5, 1616; Pamplona
- Died: August 20, 1690 (aged 74)
- Other names: Alexander de Bournonville, Alexander II Hyppolite, Prince of Bournonville and third Count of Hénin-Liétard
- Occupation: Flemish military commander

Alexander von Bournonville, Alexander de Bournonville, Alexander II Hyppolite, Prince of Bournonville and third Count of Hénin-Liétard (Brussels, 5 January 1616 – Pamplona, 20 August 1690) was a Flemish military commander. He held the titles of Field Marshal of the Holy Roman Empire, Knight of the Order of the Golden Fleece, Viceroy of Catalonia (1678–1685) and Viceroy of Navarre (1686–1691).

He was the son of Alexander I de Bournonville, count of Henin, Order of the Golden Fleece (1585–1656) and Anne de Melun (1590–1666).
He married with María Ernestina of Arenberg, daughter of Philippe-Charles, 3rd Count of Arenberg and had 3 daughters and a son Alexander III de Bournonville (1662–1705), his successor.

He fought for the Holy Roman Empire in the Thirty Years' War and then for Spain in the Franco-Spanish War (1635–1659), where he distinguished himself in the Battle of Arras (1654) and the Battle of Valenciennes (1656).
He was awarded on 12 July 1658, in Madrid, by King Philip IV of Spain the title of Prince of Bournonville, now a place located in Pas-de-Calais near the frontier with Belgium.

In 1672, he fought as Imperial Field marshal in the Franco-Dutch War and was unable to defeat Vicomte de Turenne in the Battle of Entzheim, despite the Holy Roman Empire's numerical superiority.

In 1676 he entered again in Spanish service and was sent the next year to Messina to crush there the rebellion supported by France.
Bournonville later settled in Spain and became both Viceroy of Catalonia and Viceroy of Navarre.

== See also ==
- List of Spanish viceroys of Catalonia
- List of Field Marshals of the Holy Roman Empire
- Viceroy of Navarre
- Order of the Golden Fleece
