= Germany–Turkey relations =

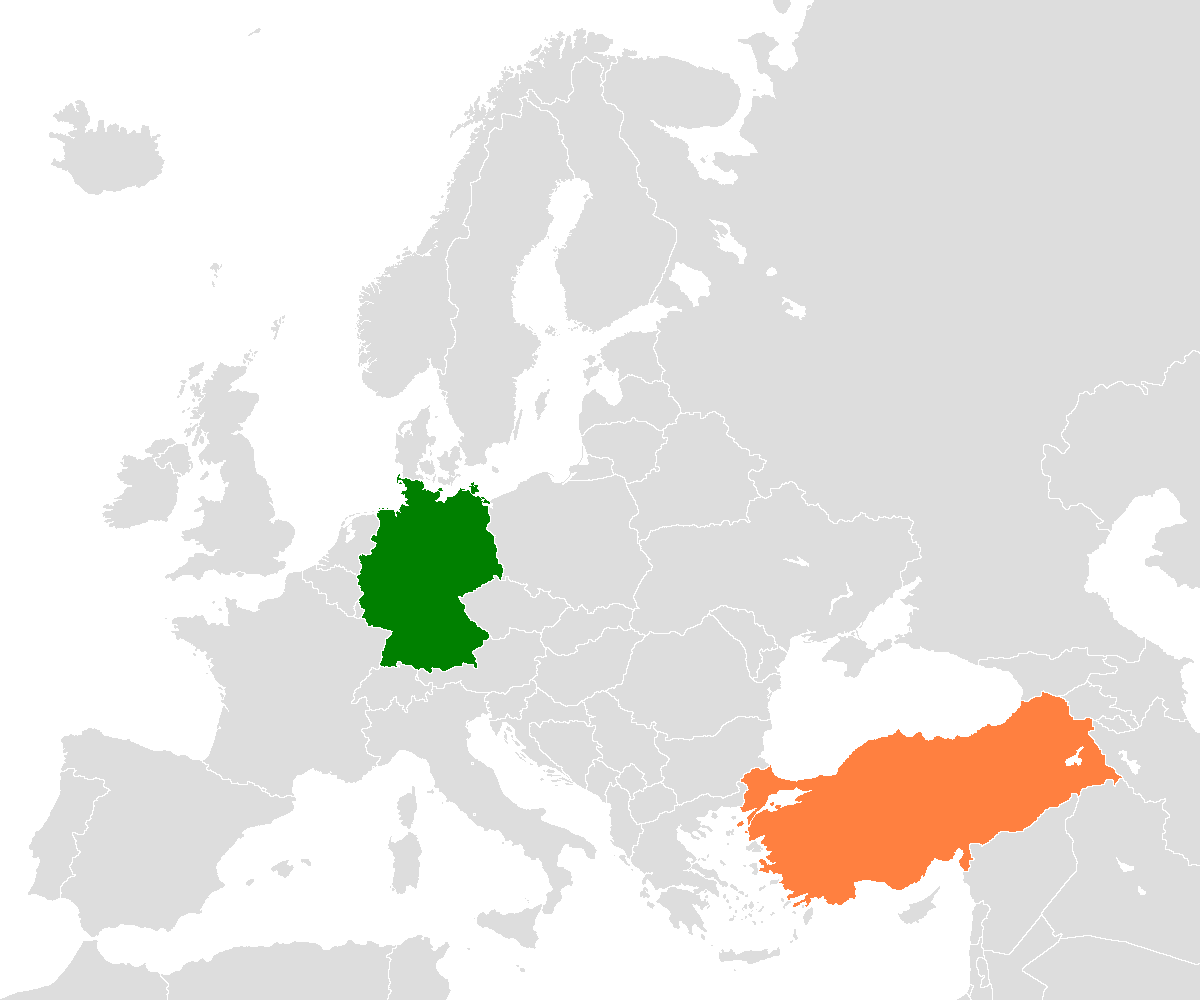

- Germany: Turkey

Diplomatic mission
- Embassy of Germany, Ankara: Embassy of Turkey, Berlin

Germany–Turkey relations (German: Deutsch-türkische Beziehungen; Turkish: Almanya-Türkiye ilişkileri) have their beginnings in the times of the Ottoman Empire and they have culminated in the development of strong bonds with many facets that include economic, military, cultural and social relations. With Turkey as a candidate for the European Union, of which Germany is the largest member, and the existence of a significant Turkish diaspora in Germany, these relations have become more and more intertwined over the decades. Relations with Turkey significantly deteriorated after the 2016–17 Turkish purges including the arrest of journalists such as Die Welt's Deniz Yücel. Both countries are members of the Council of Europe and NATO. Germany opposes Turkey's European Union membership. Germany has an embassy in Ankara and a consulate-general in Istanbul, and Turkey has an embassy in Berlin.

== History ==
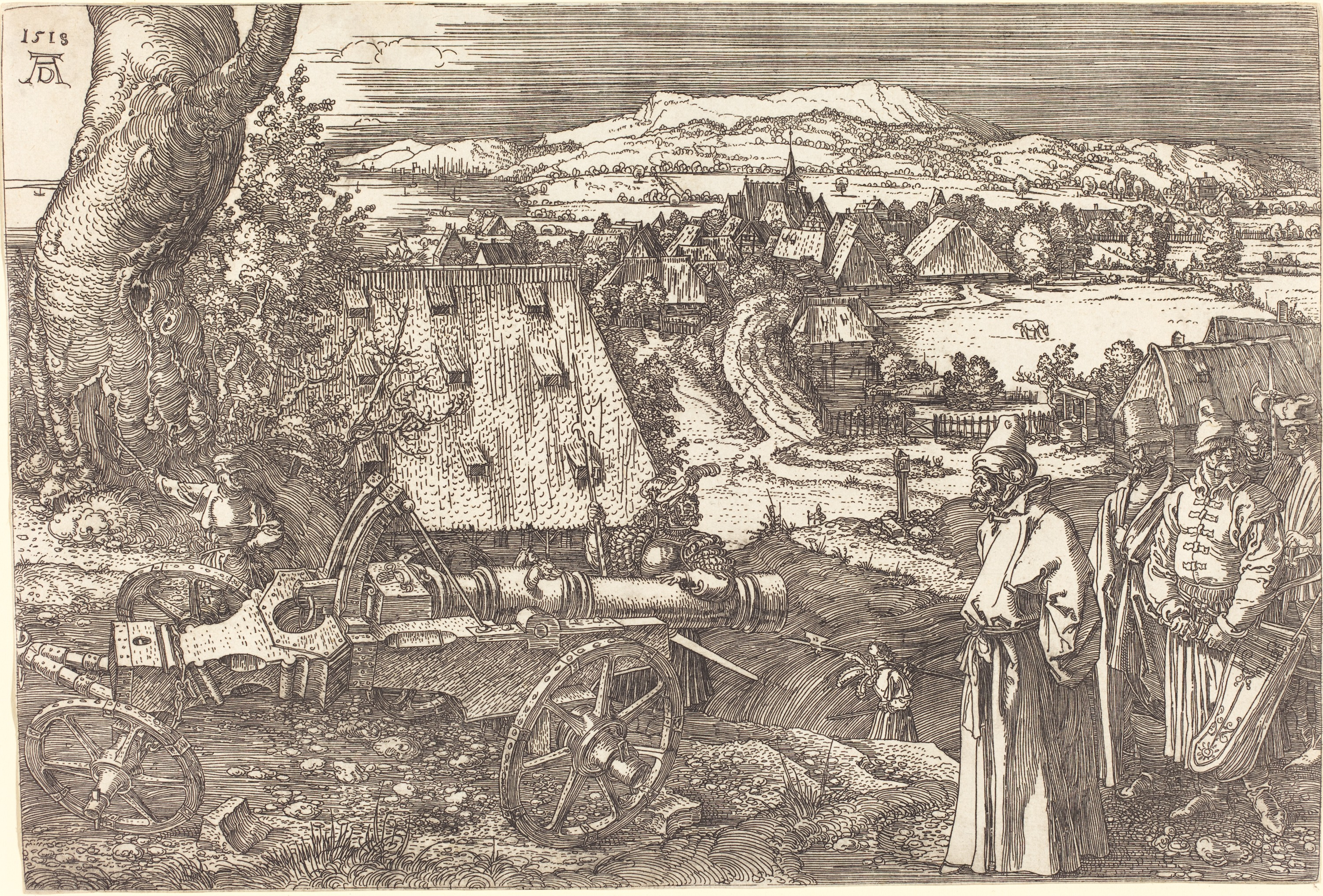
"The Great Gun" (1518), an allegorical representation by Albrecht Dürer of the Turkish menace for the German lands

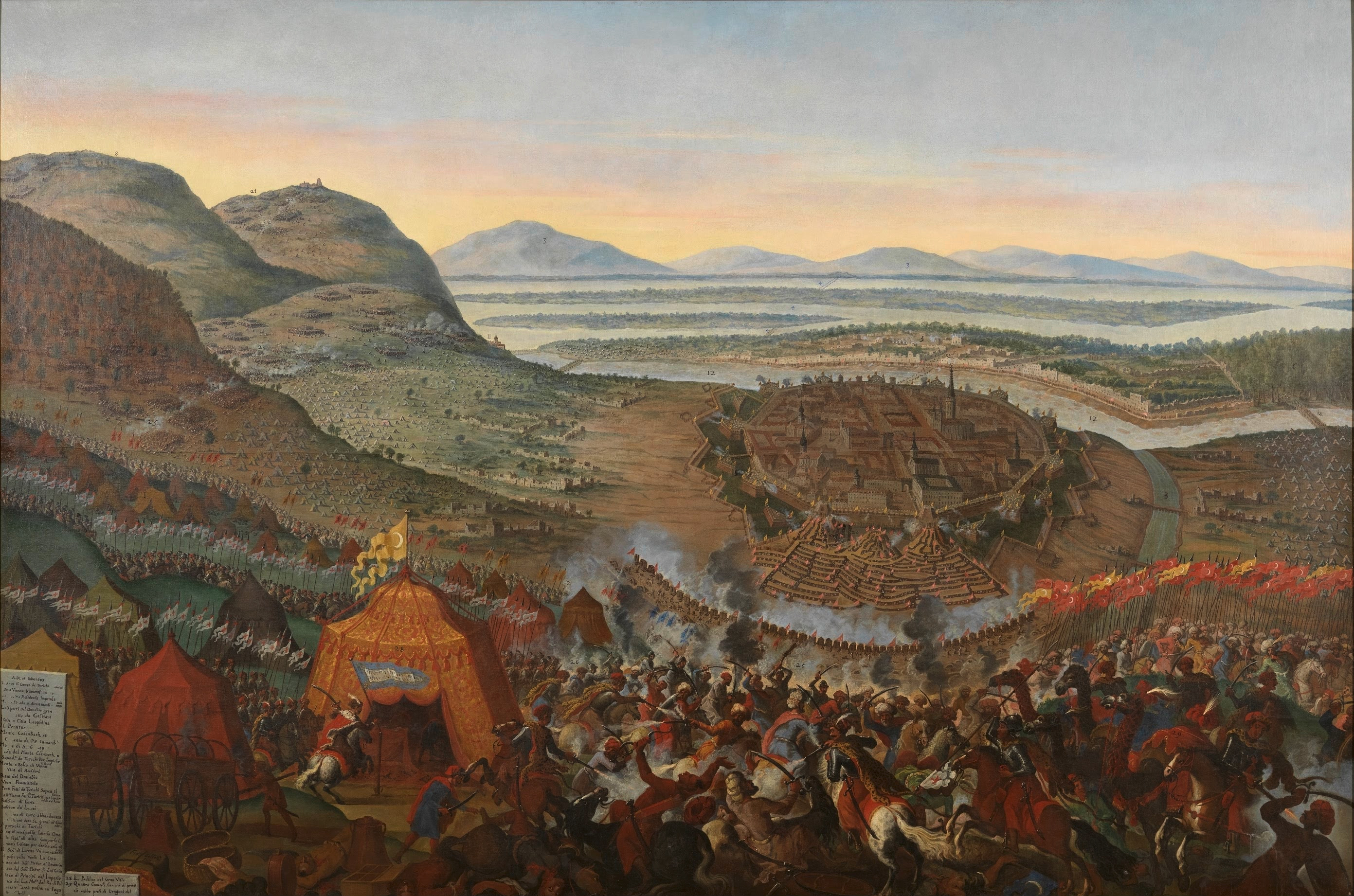
Second Siege of Vienna in 1683, painting by Frans Geffels

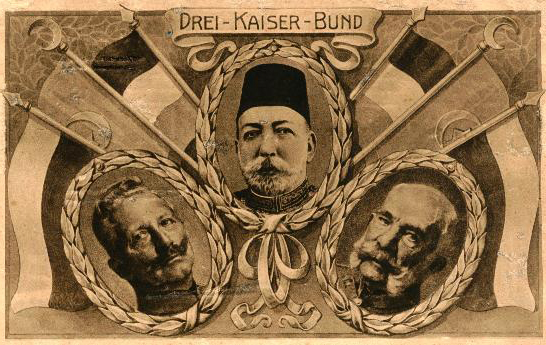
The three emperors of the Central Powers during World War I: Wilhelm II, Mehmed V, Franz Joseph. All three empires (German, Turkish, Austrian) came to an end in the aftermath of the war.

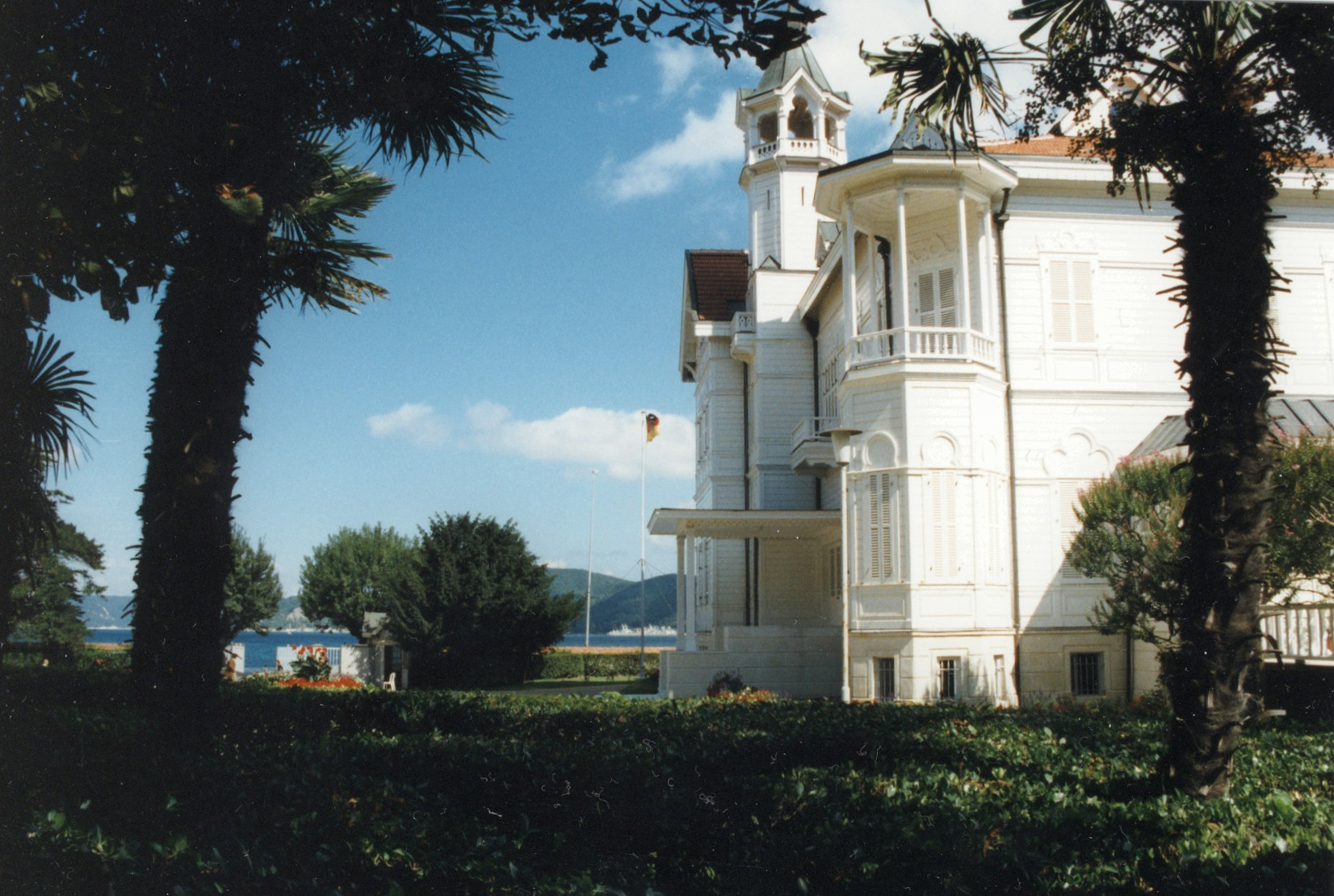
The summer residence of the German Consulate (German Embassy until 1923) in Tarabya, Istanbul, on the Bosphorus

=== Medieval and Early Modern periods ===
==== Wars between the Holy Roman Empire and Sultanate of Rum ====
- Crusade of 1101 (1101)
- Battle of Dorylaeum (1147)
- Battle of Philomelion (1190)
- Battle of Iconium (1190)

==== Wars between the Holy Roman Empire and Ottoman Empire ====
- Battle of Nicopolis (1396)
- Battle of Mohács (1526)
- First Turkish Siege of Vienna (1529)
- Little War in Hungary (1530–1552)
- Italian War of 1536–38
- Siege of Buda (1541)
- Italian War of 1542–46
- Siege of Esztergom (1543)
- Siege of Nice (1543)
- Italian War of 1551–59
- Long Turkish War (1591–1606)
- Turkish Siege of Érsekújvár (1663)
- Battle of Saint Gotthard (1664)
- Great Turkish War (1683–1699)
- Second Turkish Siege of Vienna (1683)
- Battle of Párkány (1683)
- First Holy League Siege of Buda (1684)
- Holy League Siege of Érsekújvár (1685)
- Second Holy League Siege of Buda (1686)
- Siege of Pécs (1686)
- Second Battle of Mohács (1687)
- Holy League Siege of Belgrade (1688)
- Turkish Siege of Belgrade (1690)
- Battle of Slankamen (1691)
- Battle of Lugos (1695)
- Battle of Ulaş (1696)
- Battle of Zenta (1697)

=== Late 19th century and World War I ===
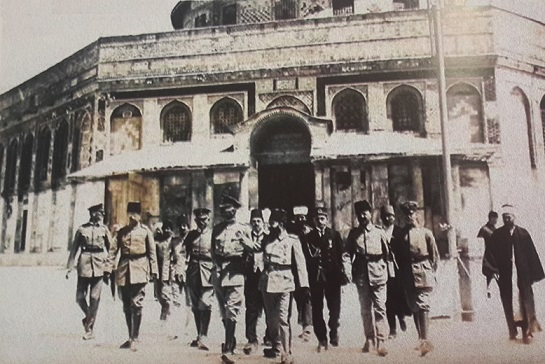
Djemal Pasha accompanying German General Erich von Falkenhayn, who commanded the Ottoman Yildirim Army.

- Baghdad Railway
- Ottoman–German Alliance
- Pursuit of Goeben and Breslau
- Middle Eastern theatre of World War I
- Germany and the Armenian genocide

In the late 19th century, the Ottoman Empire suffered defeats in the Russo-Turkish and Greek-Ottoman Wars, and sought to reform their military. Many army officers ended up training in Germany. The Sultan of the Ottoman Empire, Abdulhamid II (1876–1909), asked the Prussians for military support, and the GMC (German Military Commission) was established in 1882, and operated until the end of WW1.

The Ottoman Empire wanted an alliance with Germany because Germany was one of the few powers in Europe that did not seek Turkish territory, unlike Russia and Britain. Otto Von Bismarck visited the Ottoman Empire and declared himself a "friend of Muslims", and it was the German government's position that Turkey could be used to incite revolt in India, and could "tie up" the British army and navy.

"Colmar von der Goltz, head of the German military mission from 1883 to 1895, trained Ottoman army officers and wrote textbooks for them." He also befriended many important members of the young Turks movement.

The German proposals to build a railway system toward Baghdad alarmed the British, for it threatened British control over the links to India. However, these issues were peacefully resolved in February 1914, and did not play a role in the July Crisis that ended in the Great War.

The Ottoman–German Alliance was an alliance between the German Empire and the Ottoman Empire made on August 2, 1914, shortly following the outbreak of World War I. The alliance was created as part of a joint-cooperative effort that would strengthen and modernize the failing Ottoman military, as well as provide Germany safe passage into neighboring British colonies. The treaty came from the initiative of the Ottomans. It was replaced in January 1915 by a full-scale military alliance that promised Ottoman entry into the war. The Central Powers of World War I would eventually be made up of both the Germans and the Ottomans, as well as the Austro-Hungarian Empire and Bulgaria.

German General Otto Liman von Sanders was given command of the Ottoman Fifth Army defending Gallipoli.

Generals Erich von Falkenhayn and Otto Liman von Sanders commanded the Ottoman Yildirim Army during the Sinai and Palestine Campaign.

=== World War II ===
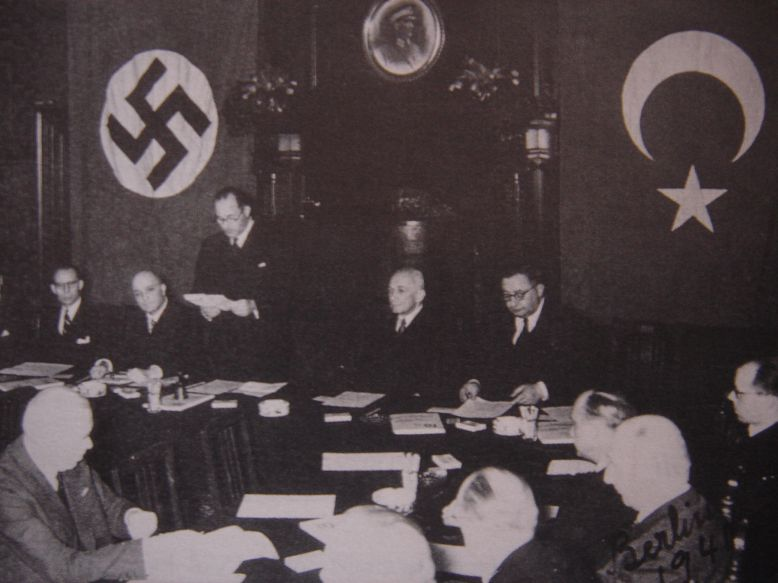
German–Turkish Treaty of Friendship and Non-Aggression

During World War II, Turkey maintained diplomatic relations with Germany until August 1944. The German–Turkish Treaty of Friendship was signed on 18 June 1941. In October 1941, the "Clodius Agreement" (named after the German negotiator, Dr. Carl August Clodius) was achieved, whereby Turkey would export up to 45,000 tons of chromite ore to Germany in 1941–1942, and 90,000 tons of the mineral in each of 1943 and 1944, contingent on Germany's supplies of military equipment to Turkey. The Germans provided as many as 117 railway locomotives and 1,250 freight rail cars to transport the ore. In an attempt to prevent the supply of this strategic mineral to Germany, the United States and the United Kingdom went on a spree of what was termed "preclusive buying", buying out Turkish chromite even if they did not need so much of it. As a part of the "package deal”, the Anglo-Americans bought Turkish dried fruit and tobacco as well.

In August 1944, the Soviet Army entered Bulgaria and cut overland contact between Turkey and the Axis powers. Turkey severed its diplomatic and commercial relations with Germany, and on February 23, 1945, declared war on Germany.

== Political relations ==
=== Accession of Turkey to the European Union ===
Germany's support to the Turkish bid has not been consistent in the German political arena. Support has varied over time; for example one former Chancellor, Helmut Kohl, expressed opposition on the issue, while another, Gerhard Schröder, was seen to be a staunch supporter.

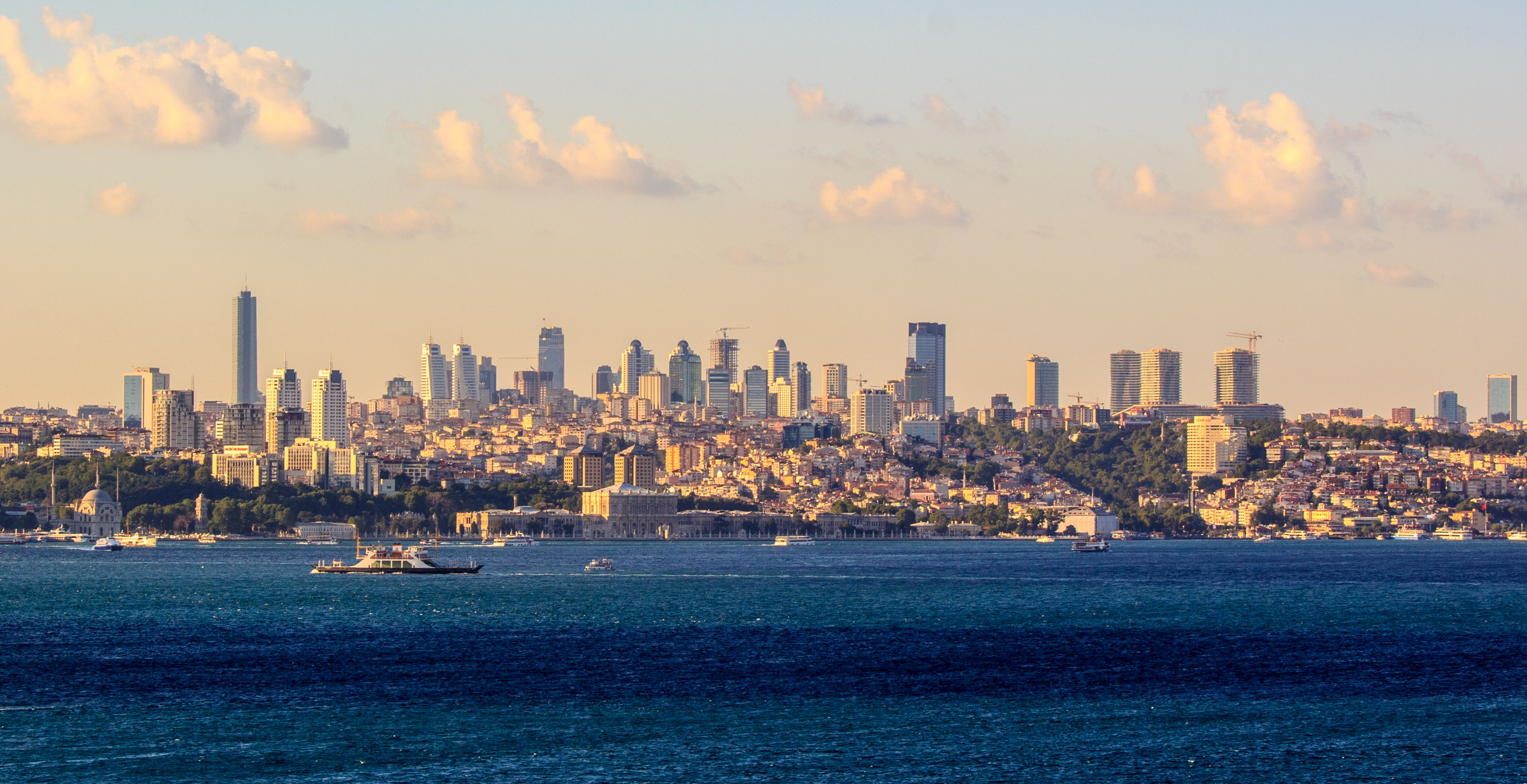
Skyline of Levent financial district in Istanbul, as seen from the Bosphorus. If Turkey were to join the European Union, Istanbul would become the largest city of the EU and Turkey would be the largest EU member in terms of both area and population.

German Chancellor Angela Merkel advocated a "vaguely defined partnership" and has opposed full membership of Turkey to the EU. Then-Prime Minister Recep Tayyip Erdoğan said in response in July 2009, "We will never accept a privileged partnership. We want full membership into the EU. We don't want anything else other than full membership."

In 2006, Merkel said "Turkey could be in deep, deep trouble when it comes to its aspirations to join the European Union" regarding its refusal to open up its ports to European Union member Cyprus. She added:

We need an implementation of the Ankara Protocols regarding unrestricted trade with Cyprus too. Otherwise, the situation becomes very, very serious when it comes to the continuation of Turkey's accession negotiations. I appeal to Turkey to do everything to avoid such a complicated situation and not to lead the European Union into such a situation.

Merkel also said that she could not imagine negotiations continuing without concessions made by Ankara toward opening up its ports to Cypriot ships. The Turkish Government responded by demanding that the EU lift its embargo on the Turkish-controlled part of the island in return.

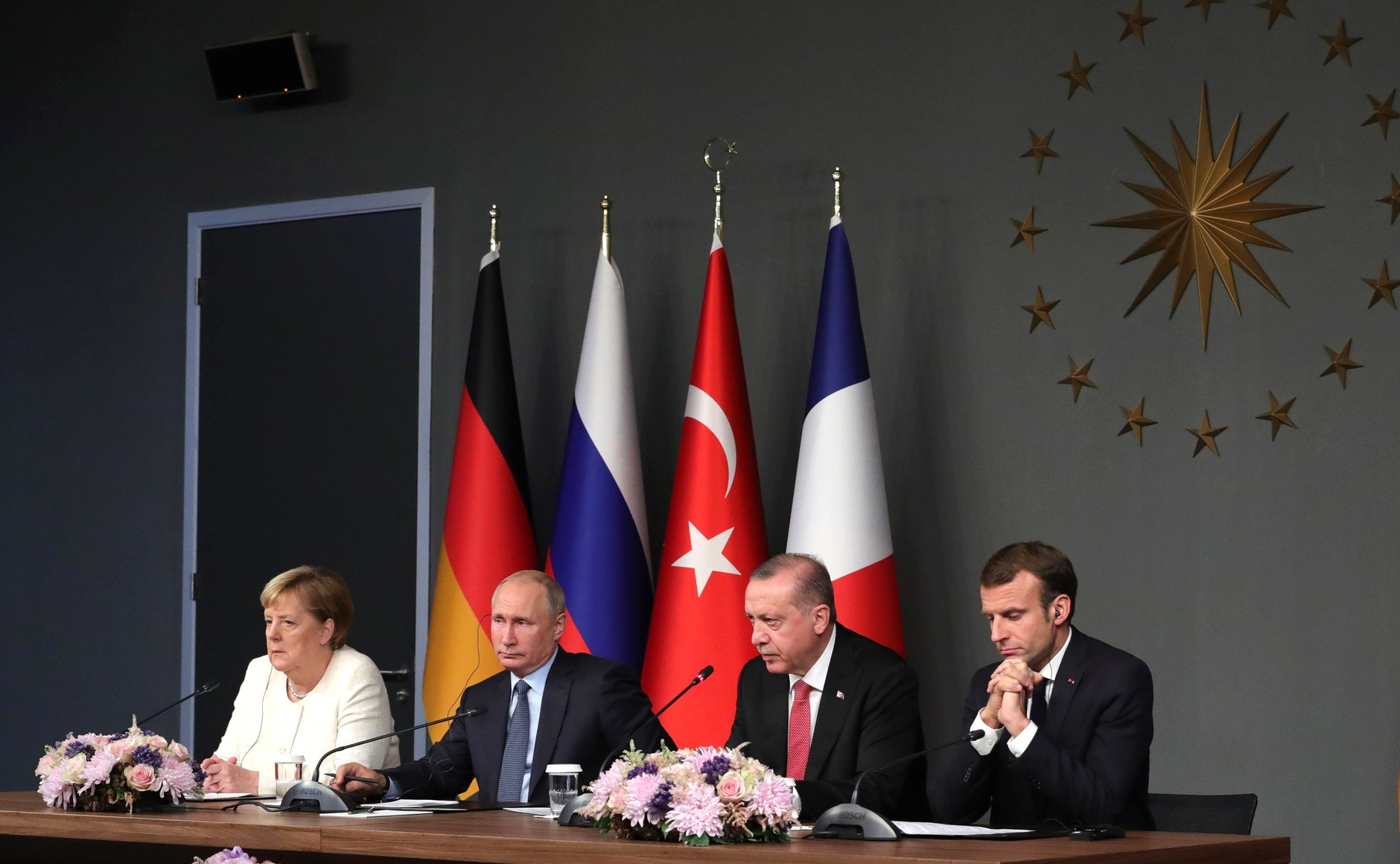
Angela Merkel, Emmanuel Macron, Recep Tayyip Erdoğan and Vladimir Putin when giving a press conference as part of Syria summit in Istanbul, Turkey.

On 20 June 2013, in the wake of Ankara's crackdown on mass demonstrations in Taksim Square and throughout the country, Germany blocked the start to new EU accession talks with Turkey. According to the Financial Times, one Turkish official said that such a move could potentially break off political relations with the bloc. "The EU needs Turkey more than Turkey needs the EU," Egemen Bagis, Turkey's EU minister stated. "If we have to, we could tell them, "get lost.'" Germany says that its reservation stems from a technical issue, but Angela Merkel has described herself as "shocked" after Ankara's use of overwhelming police force against mostly peaceful demonstrators.

On 25 June EU foreign ministers backed a German proposal to postpone further EU membership talks with Turkey for about four months due to the Turkey's handling of the protests. A delay in opening new chapters for Turkey would raise new doubts about whether the country should ever be admitted to the European Union. In early June in comments on Turkey's possible membership German Chancellor Angela Merkel did not address the compromise proposal but said Turkey must make progress on its relations with EU member Cyprus to give impetus to its membership ambitions.

=== EU sanctions ===
In December 2020, German Chancellor Angela Merkel was among the EU leaders who opposed sanctions against Turkey, due to its gas drilling activities in the Mediterranean and foreign policy in general.

=== Diplomatic incidents ===
In August 2018, German firemen removed a four-meter golden statue of Turkish President Recep Tayyip Erdoğan in Wiesbaden on security grounds after it provoked an angry response from local people.

In October 2021, in the wake of the appeal for the release of Turkish activist Osman Kavala signed by 10 western countries, Turkish president Recep Tayyip Erdoğan ordered his foreign minister to declare the German ambassador persona non grata, alongside the other 9 ambassadors. However, the ambassadors did not receive any formal notice to leave the country and Erdoğan eventually stepped back. In April 2022, Turkey condemned Germany's summoning of its ambassador and called in Germany’s ambassador Jürgen Schulz in a tit-for-tat move amid a row over Kavala's jailing for life.

In May 2022, Foreign Minister Mevlüt Çavuşoğlu summoned the German and French ambassadors to Turkey to protest events organized by the Kurdistan Workers' Party (PKK) in both countries.

In July 2022, the website of Deutsche Welle (DW) was blocked by an Ankara court after it refused to comply with a request to obtain a broadcast licence; DW had argued that being overseen by the country’s broadcast regulator would lead to demands that would be tantamount to censorship.

In May 2023, the public prosecutor's office in Darmstadt announced publicly that police had searched the private apartments of two journalists in the western town of Moerfelden-Walldorf and briefly detained them on suspicion of dangerous dissemination of personal data. In response, Turkey summoned the German ambassador in Ankara to express condemnation over the detention.

In July 2024, Germany summoned Turkey's ambassador over Turkish football player Merih Demiral's ultra-nationalist "wolf salute" at a UEFA Euro 2024 match, days ahead of a reported trip by Erdoğan to Berlin.

=== State visits ===
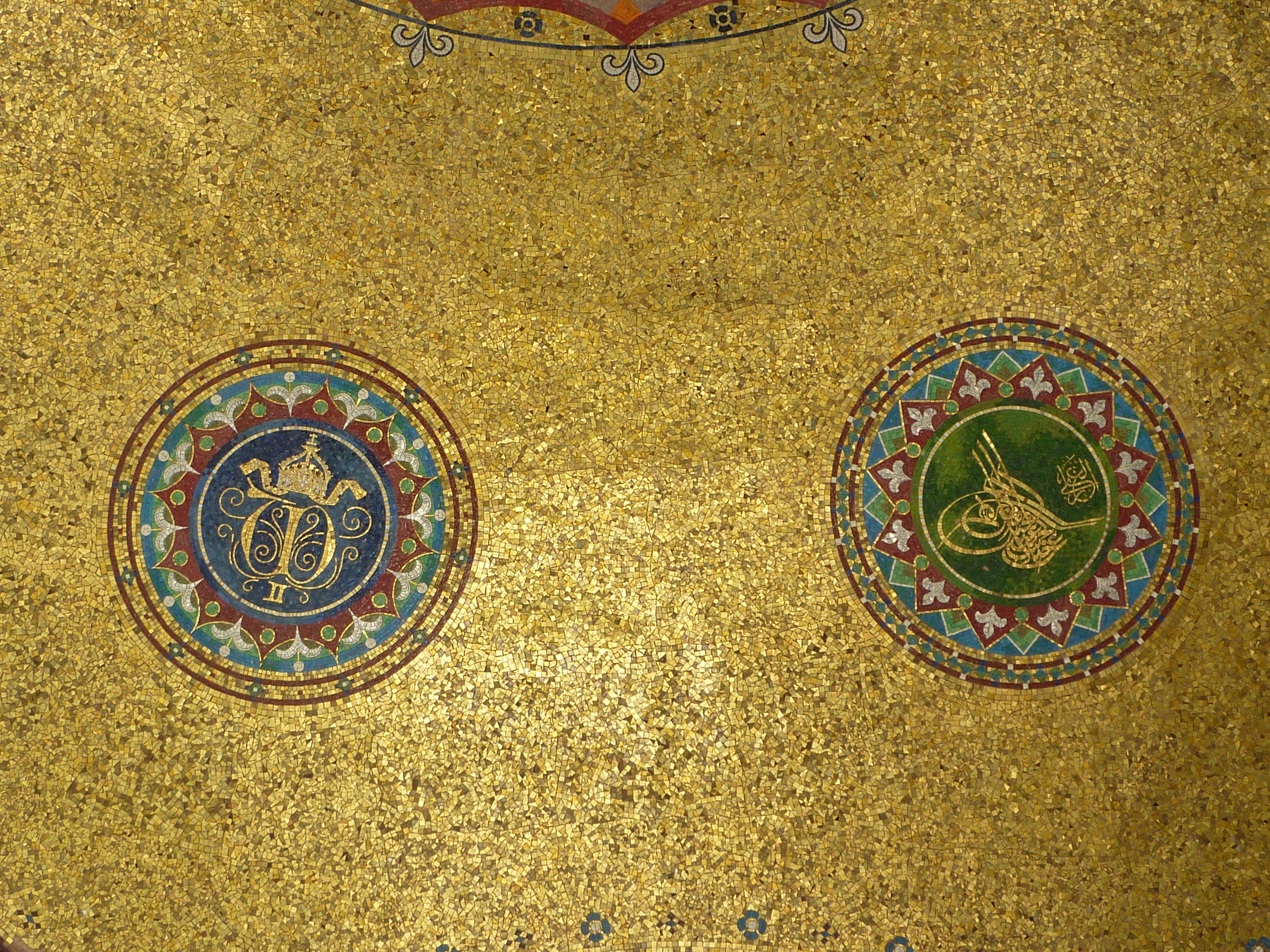
The monogram of Wilhelm II and the tughra of Abdul Hamid II on the dome of the German Fountain in Istanbul, commemorating the Kaiser's visit to Turkey in 1898.

In 2006, Chancellor Angela Merkel visited Turkey for talks with Prime Minister Recep Tayyip Erdoğan on bilateral relations and to discuss accession of Turkey to the EU.

In 2008, Prime Minister Recep Tayyip Erdoğan visited Berlin and met Chancellor Merkel, and also visited Munich. He suggested during the visit that the German government establish Turkish medium schools and that German high schools hire more teachers from Turkey.

In 2011, Prime Minister Recep Tayyip Erdoğan made another visit to Germany. During a speech in Düsseldorf, he urged Turks in Germany, to integrate, but not assimilate, a statement that caused a political outcry in Germany.

In 2018, in advance of a state visit by now-president Erdoğan, the Erdogan Not Welcome association organised protest demonstrations with about 80-200 participants in Berlin, Essen and Bielefeld. For Erdoğan's supporters in Turkey and abroad, the most significant event was the opening of a new multimillion-euro mega mosque in the cathedral city of Cologne. The mosque is run by the DITIB, a Turkish government-run Islamic organization in Germany. It is situated in the Ehrenfeld district of Cologne, also colloquially known as "Little Istanbul". The visit prompted criticism towards German president Frank-Walter Steinmeier who hosted a state banquet from Deniz Yucel, a German-Turkish journalist who was jailed for a year in Turkey. Yucel called the visit a betrayal of all those who longed for a free, democratic and secular society in Turkey. German authorities warned Erdoğan from using the visit for public campaigning.

On 19 October 2024, Turkish President Erdogan and German Chancellor Scholz met in Istanbul, where they disagreed on a regional issue but maintained a cooperative tone. Their talks focused on strengthening ties through arms deals and addressing migration concerns.

== Espionage accusations and detentions ==
Since the 2016 coup attempt, Turkish authorities have brought espionage accusations against a range of people including journalists, opposition politicians, human rights activists and employees of foreign ambassies, non governmental organisations and foundations. Several of these cases involved German institutions and at times have caused diplomatic friction between the two countries, in what has been described the practice as a form of hostage diplomacy. In 2017, Erdoğan described Deniz Yücel, then a correspondent for the German newspaper Die Welt, as a "German agent", which led to a serious diplomatic crisis between Germany and Turkey. Espionage charges have also been brought against a lawyer working for the German embassy in Turkey. According to Hakki Tas of the German Institute for Global and Area Studies, suspicion of German organisation predates the Erdoğan government, in early 2000s representatives of German organisations stood trial in Turkey because for allegations that the German intelligence service was using German foundations as a front. In November 2026, Yonca Verdioğlu Şık, a project coordinator who had worked for 18 years for the Heinrich Böll Foundation in Istanbul, was arrested at her home and according to her lawyer, accused of political and military espionage. She was born and raised in Germany. Transcripts of her interrogation published afterwards, reportedly contained no question about espionage, instead she was asked about the foundation's activities and about transfers from the foundation to her bank account. She was released after several days and made subject to a travel ban. She is married to the journalist and Workers' Party of Turkey MP Ahmet Şık, and opposition critics argued that the arrest was a means of pressuring him directly. Tas argues that such cases serve both domestic and foreign policy purposes. They signal to Turkish civil society that foreign contacts or funding can become ground for investigation.

== Economic relations ==
Germany and Turkey have held strong economic ties with one another throughout time. Machinery, electrical goods and motor vehicles and supply parts for the automobile industry account for a particularly large portion of German exports to Turkey. Textiles/leather goods and food, and increasingly motor vehicles and electronic goods, are the principal German imports from Turkey. At present, companies owned by Turkish businessmen in Germany employ approximately 200 thousand people. The annual turnover of these companies has reached 45 billion marks. More than three million German tourists visit Turkey annually. More than 4000 German companies are active in Turkey. Germany has turned out to be the number one partner of Turkey in fields such as foreign trade, financial and technical cooperation, tourism and defense industry.

In 2020, Germany was the biggest trade partner of Turkey, they had a bilateral trade volume of $38 billion. German companies invested nearly €25 billion in Turkey's energy sector.

== Arms deals ==
German Emperor Wilhelm II visited Istanbul in 1889 to secure the sale of German-made rifles to the Ottoman Army.

Turkey is an operator of the German Type 214 submarine. Moreover, Turkish Altay tanks rely on German MTU engines and RENK transmissions. Germany had also provided technical assistance in developing and operating drones, Leopard tank 2A4, KORKUT anti-aircraft system, PorSav missiles, MILGEM warship, Airbus A400M Atlas and MEKO frigates. As of July 2021, six German submarines were to be delivered to Turkey in 2022, in addition to five other Reis-class submarines in the next few years in a deal worth around $4 billion.

== Relationship between Turkish and German political parties ==
=== HDP and German green party ===
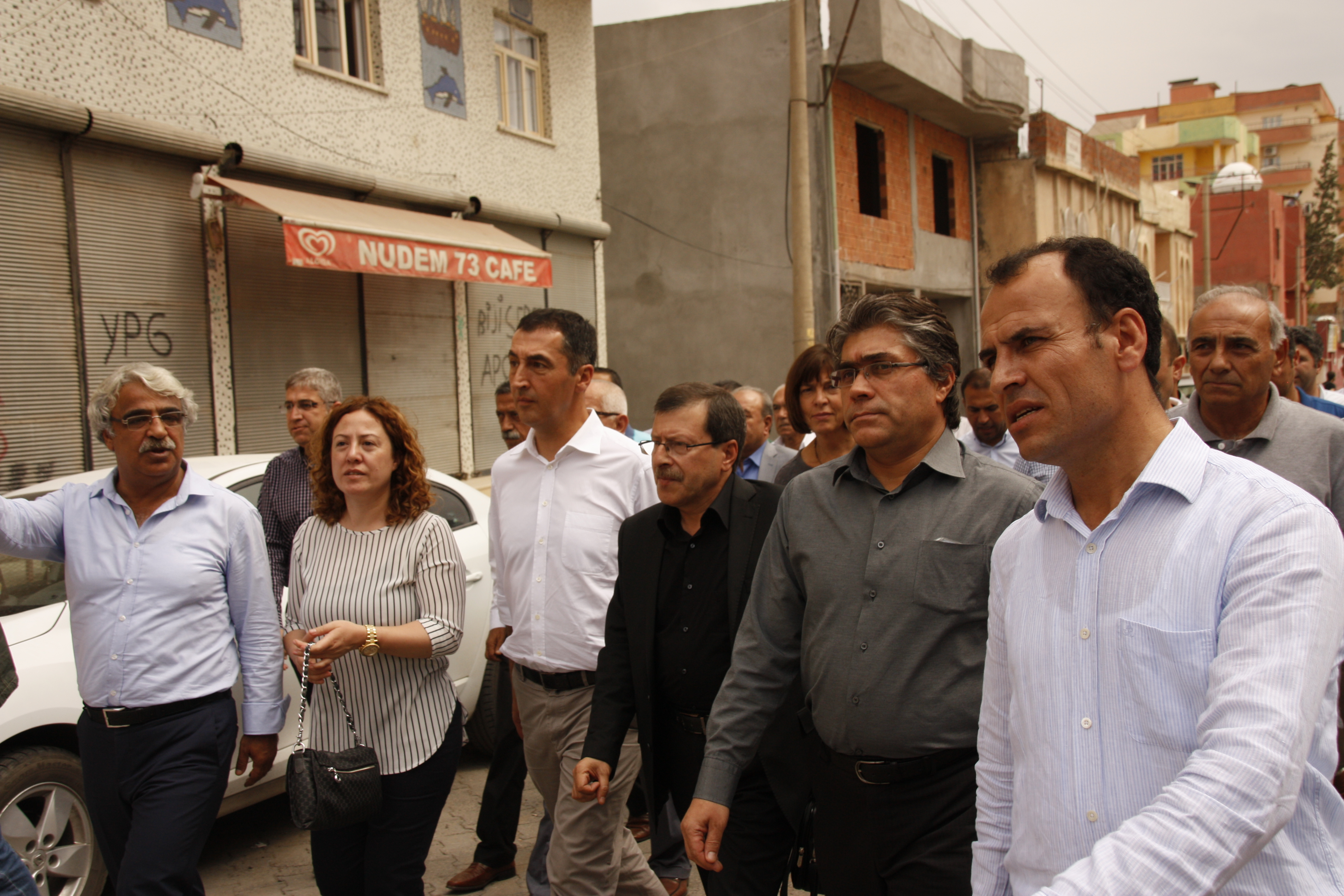
German Green party leader Cem Özdemir in Turkey during the Şırnak clashes, 15 September 2015

In May 2015, the German party Alliance '90/The Greens encouraged Turkish citizens living in Germany to vote for the Turkish Party HDP in the upcoming June 2015 Turkish general election. The MP Cem Özdemir of the Green Party, a prominent opponent of the politics of Turkish president Recep Tayyip Erdoğan, was given a personal security detail of three agents at the Munich Security Conference in 2018, after the Turkish security detail allegedly has identified him as a terrorist.

=== AKP and CDU ===
On 16 February 2004, Angela Merkel, then chairwoman of the German opposition party CDU, met with representatives of the ruling Turkish party AKP. The press response was somewhat perplexing, as for example, the German magazine Der Spiegel first reported an "Anti-Türkei-Reise" (Anti-Turkey-voyage) and only hours later that "CDU will mit islamischer AKP kooperieren" (CDU wants to cooperate with Islamic AKP). On 31 July 2016, the German Sunday newspaper Bild am Sonntag reported, that the "Union der Vielfalt", a group of members of the CDU warned the party leadership against infiltration from the AKP.

=== Recep Tayyip Erdoğan and FDP politician Wolfgang Kubicki ===
In September 2022, Recep Tayyip Erdogan has filed a lawsuit against Free Democratic Party (FDP) politician and Vice-President of the Bundestag Wolfgang Kubicki for allegedly having insulted him.

== Turkish diaspora ==
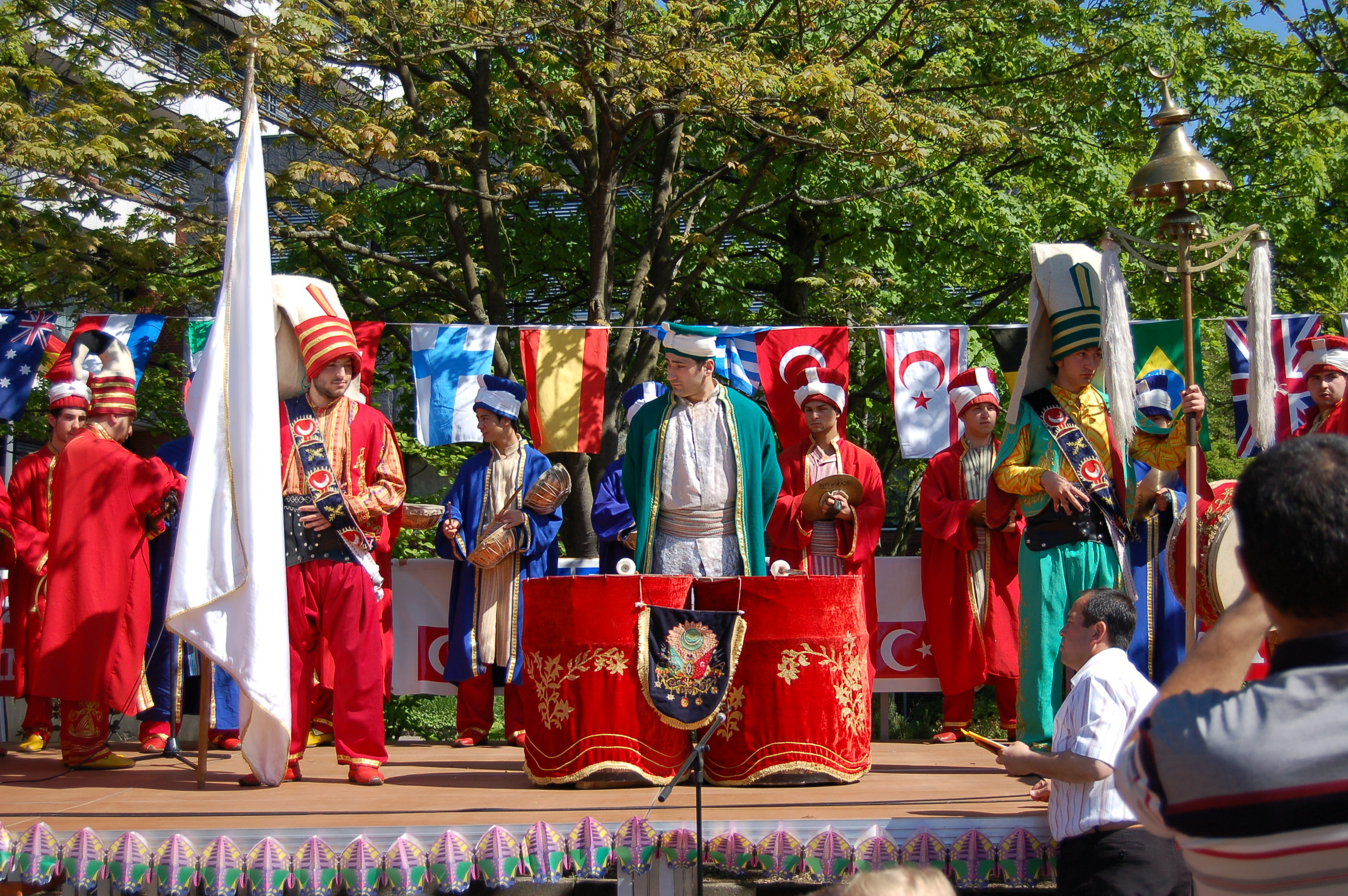
Turkish and Turkish Cypriot youth performing as an Ottoman military band in Uetersen, Schleswig-Holstein

With an estimated number of at least 2.1 million Turks in Germany, they form the largest ethnic minority.

Based on good Turkish-German relations from the 19th century onwards, Germany promoted Turkish immigration to Germany. However, large scale immigration didn't occur until the 20th century. Germany suffered an acute labor shortage after World War II and, in 1961, the Federal Republic of Germany (West Germany) officially invited Turkish workers to Germany to fill in this void, particularly to work in the factories that helped fuel Germany's economic miracle. The German authorities named these people Gastarbeiter (German for guest workers). Most Turks in Germany trace their ancestry to Central and Eastern Anatolia. Today, Turks are Germany's largest ethnic minority and form most of Germany's Muslim minority.

== Turkey's purges ==
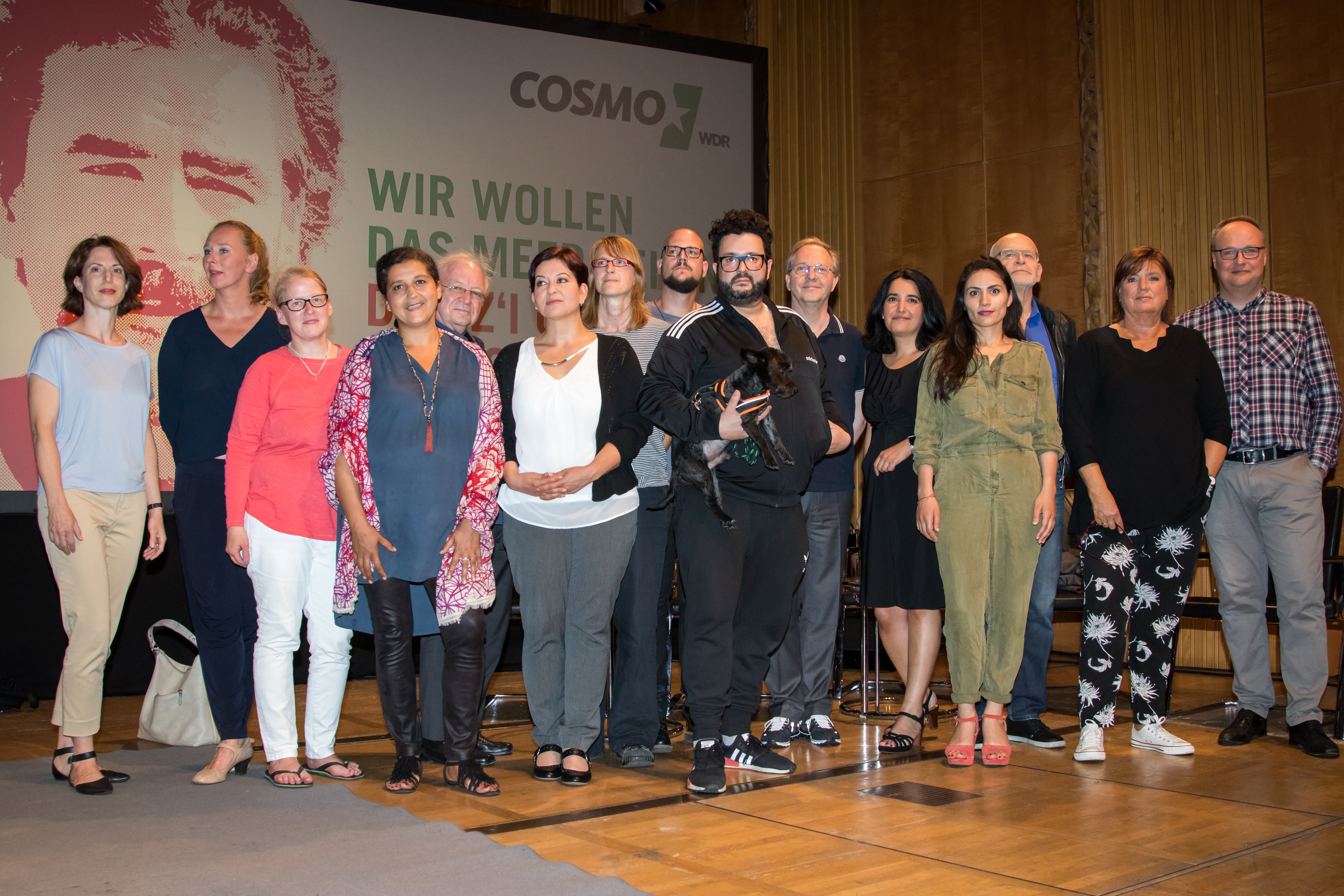
Free Deniz Yücel campaign in Cologne, 6 July 2017

On August 14, 2018, Turkish police arrested another German citizen on terrorism-related charges. German authorities said nine German nationals were in detention in Turkey for "political reasons" at that time.

In October 2018, Germany has warned citizens visiting Turkey to be extra cautious about their social media feeds in response to a spate of cases of Germans arrested for criticism of the Turkish government. “In some cases merely ‘liking’ another's post of that nature is enough,” The Germany Foreign Ministry said that even private comments could be risky. “Non-public comments on social media can be forwarded to Turkish authorities via denunciations,”

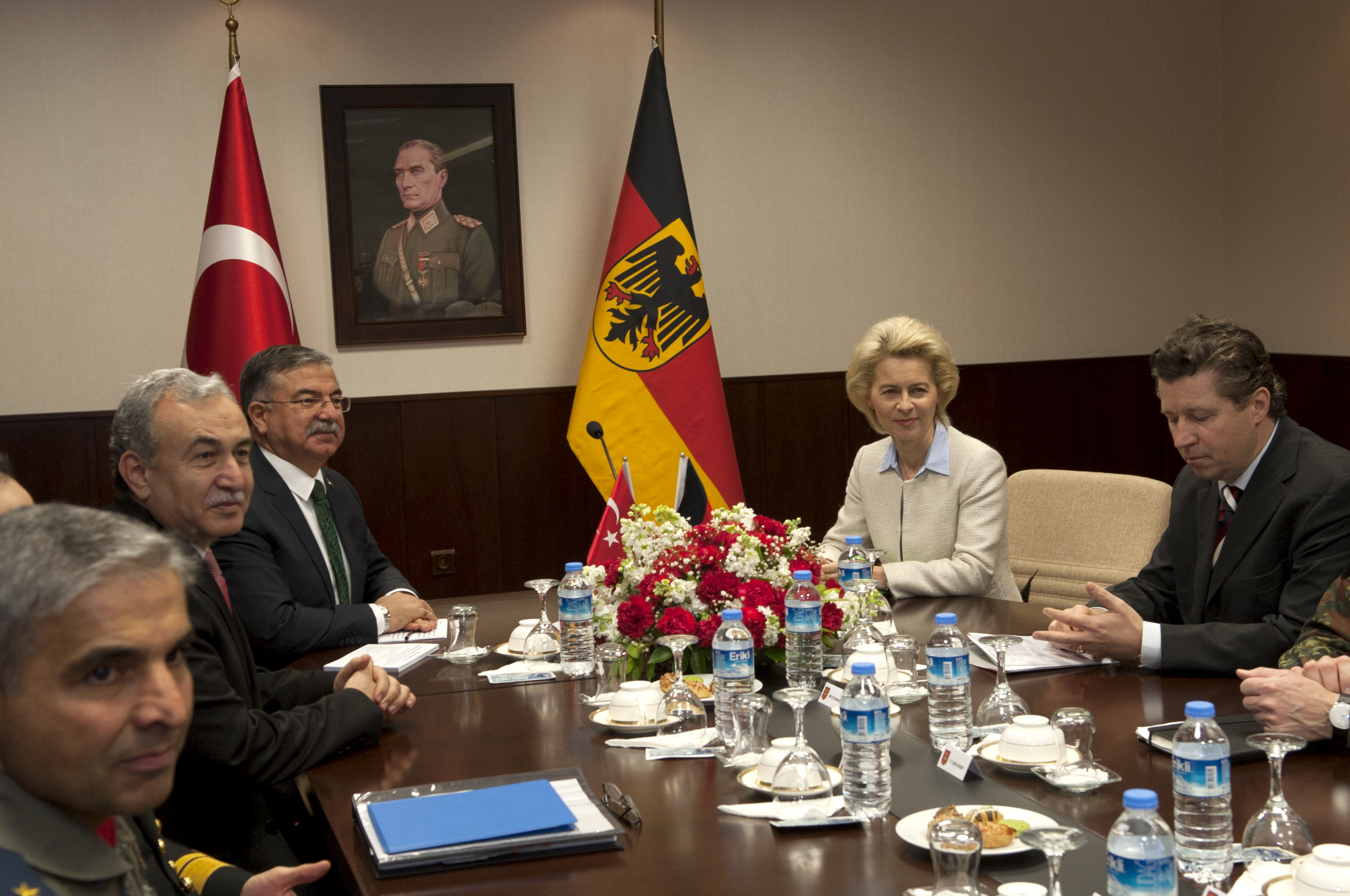
Turkish Defense Minister İsmet Yılmaz and German Defense Minister Ursula von der Leyen, Incirlik Air Base, 21 January 2016

== Turkish espionage in Germany ==
In July 2015, Der Tagesspiegel newspaper reported that German federal prosecutors were looking into claims that three men - two Turks and a German national - were instructed by MIT to spy on Erdogan critics in Cologne, particularly Kurds and members of the Muslim minority Alevi community.

In 2016, Bundestag Parliamentary Oversight Panel members demanded answer from German government about the reports that Germans of Turkish origin are being pressured in Germany by informers and officers of Turkey's National Intelligence Organization "MIT" intelligence agency. According to reports Turkey had 6,000 informants plus MIT officers in Germany who were putting pressure on "German Turks". Hans-Christian Ströbele told that there was an "unbelievable" level of "secret activities" in Germany by Turkey's MIT agency. According to Erich Schmidt-Eenboom, not even the former communist East German Stasi secret police had managed to run such a large "army of agents" in the former West Germany: "Here, it's not just about intelligence gathering, but increasingly about intelligence service repression." German lawmakers have called for an investigation, charging that Turkey is spying on suspected Gulen followers in Germany.

In March 2017, the Turkish secret intelligence service MIT was accused of conducting espionage of more than 300 people and 200 associations and schools linked to supporters of exiled Fethullah Gülen. Boris Pistorius, interior minister for Lower Saxony State, called this "intolerable and unacceptable", stating that "the intensity and ruthlessness with which people abroad are being investigated is remarkable". A German security official said that "we are horrified at how openly Turkey reveals that it is spying on Turks living here". On 30 March 2017 Interior Minister Thomas de Maiziere expresses suspicions that the move may have been intended to weigh on Turkish-German relations − "to provoke us in some way". The appallment was deepened when it was revealed that the 300 persons included politicians, including Michelle Müntefering.

In October 2017, according to German press reports officials working in Germany's immigration authorities pass on information about Turkish asylum seekers to Turkey. In many cases, even their locations were also revealed, that even their families did not know for security reasons. These incidents showed that Turkish spies may have infiltrated German authorities. In addition, Herbert Reul, the interior minister for the German state of the North Rhine-Westphalia, submitted a report to the state parliament, alleging that the Turkish-German organisation Osmanen Germania works with MIT. The organisation denied the accusations. In July 2018, Germany banned the organisation on allegations it is involved in organized crime and represents a threat to the general public.

In October 2021, German authorities arrested a Turk in a hotel at Düsseldorf for spying on behalf of Turkey. Police found a pistol, ammunition and a list with the names of Gulen supporters.

== Operation Irini ==
A Turkish freighter intercepted by German frigate Hamburg on 23 October 2020 with citing arms embargo to Libya. However, according to German officials, there was nothing about arms and allowed the passing of the ship. Turkish officials stated that this is a violation of maritime laws because Germany did it without permission from Turkey.

== Resident diplomatic missions ==
Of the Federal Republic of Germany

- Ankara (Embassy)

In 1923 the embassy was moved from Istanbul to Ankara. The embassy houses offices and official apartments, as well as the residence of the German ambassador since 1928.

- Istanbul (Consulate-General)

Following the relocation of the embassy to Ankara in 1923 the former embassy building in the Beyoğlu district of Istanbul houses the Consulate General and the German Archaeological Institute.

- İzmir (Consulate-General)
- Antalya (Consulate-General)

Of the Republic of Turkey

- Berlin (Embassy)
- Berlin (Consulate-General)
- Cologne (Consulate-General)
- Düsseldorf (Consulate-General)
- Essen (Consulate-General)
- Frankfurt (Consulate-General)
- Hamburg (Consulate-General)
- Hanover (Consulate-General)
- Karlsruhe (Consulate-General)
- Kassel (Consulate-General)
- Mainz (Consulate-General)
- Munich (Consulate-General)
- Münster (Consulate-General)
- Nuremberg (Consulate-General)
- Stuttgart (Consulate-General)

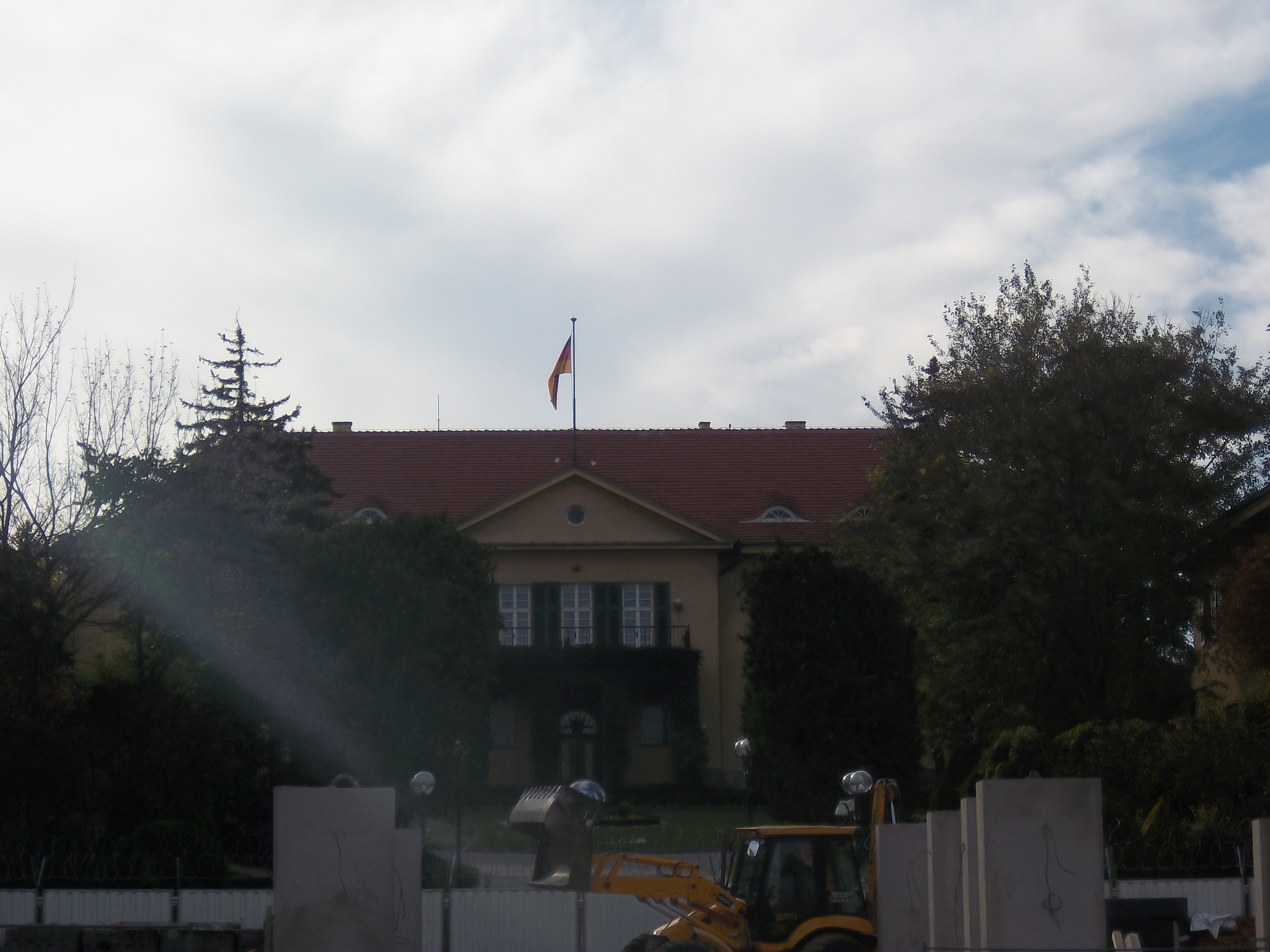
Embassy of Germany in Ankara

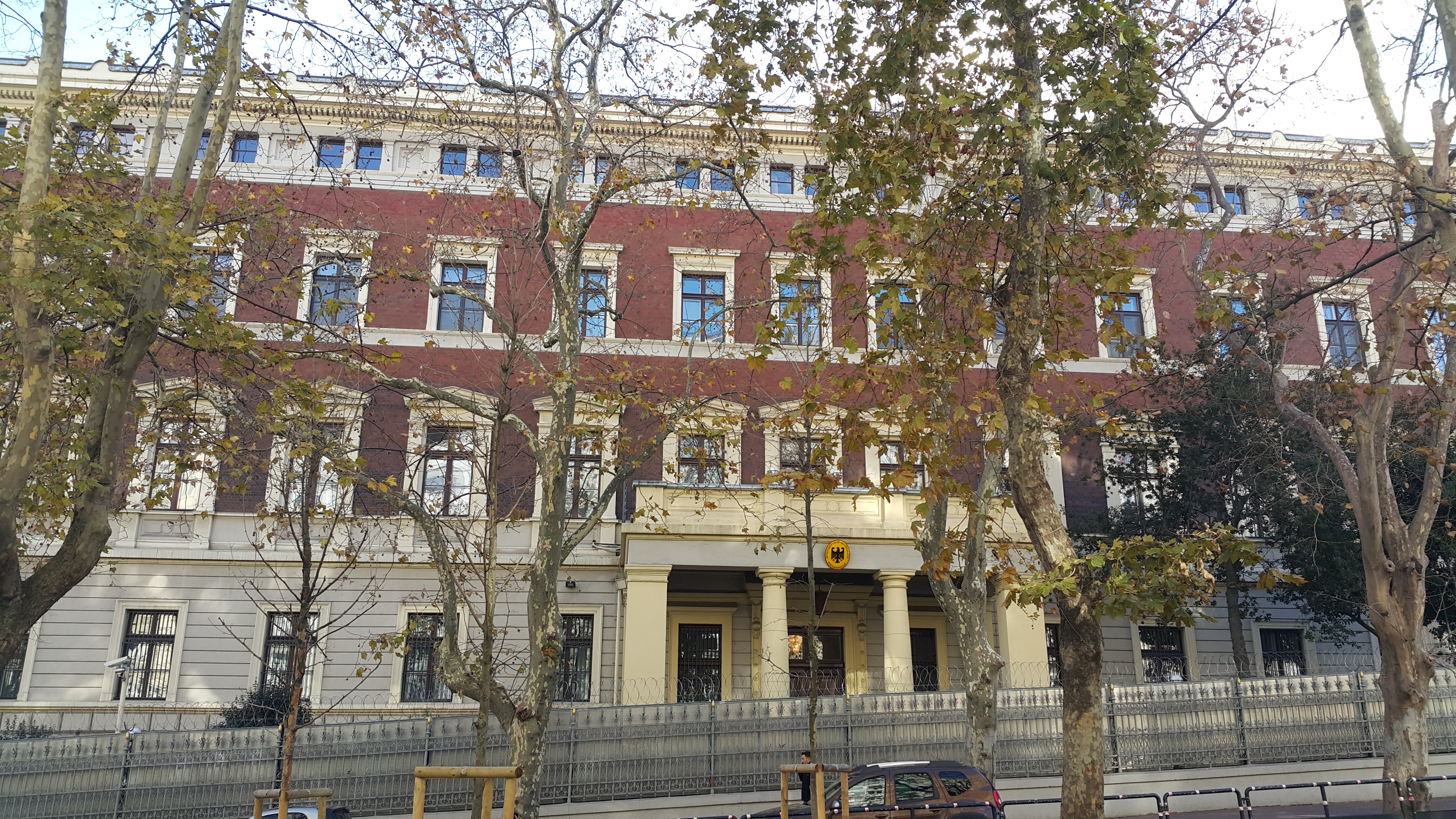
Consulate-General of Germany in Istanbul

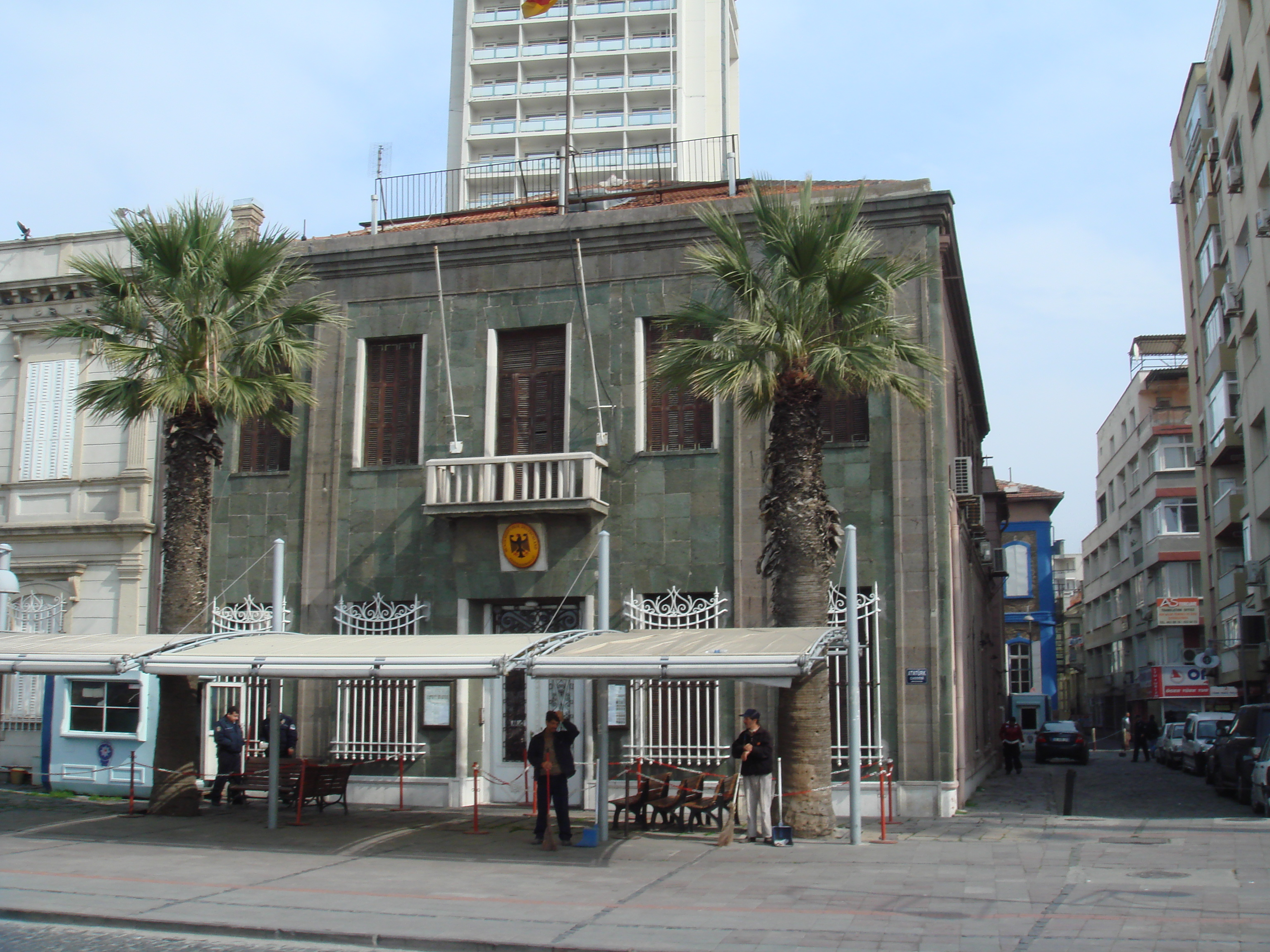
Consulate-General of Germany in İzmir
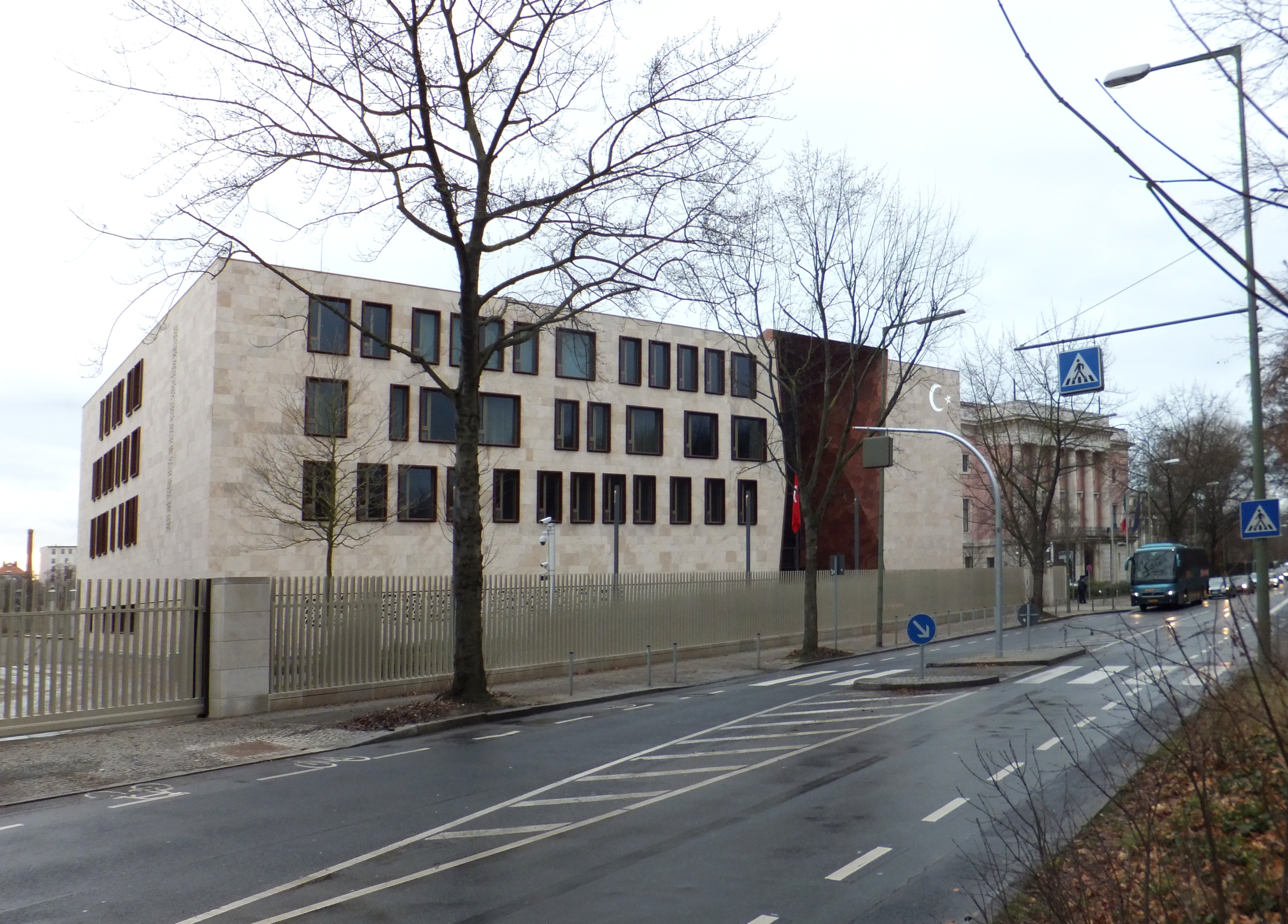
Embassy of Turkey in Berlin

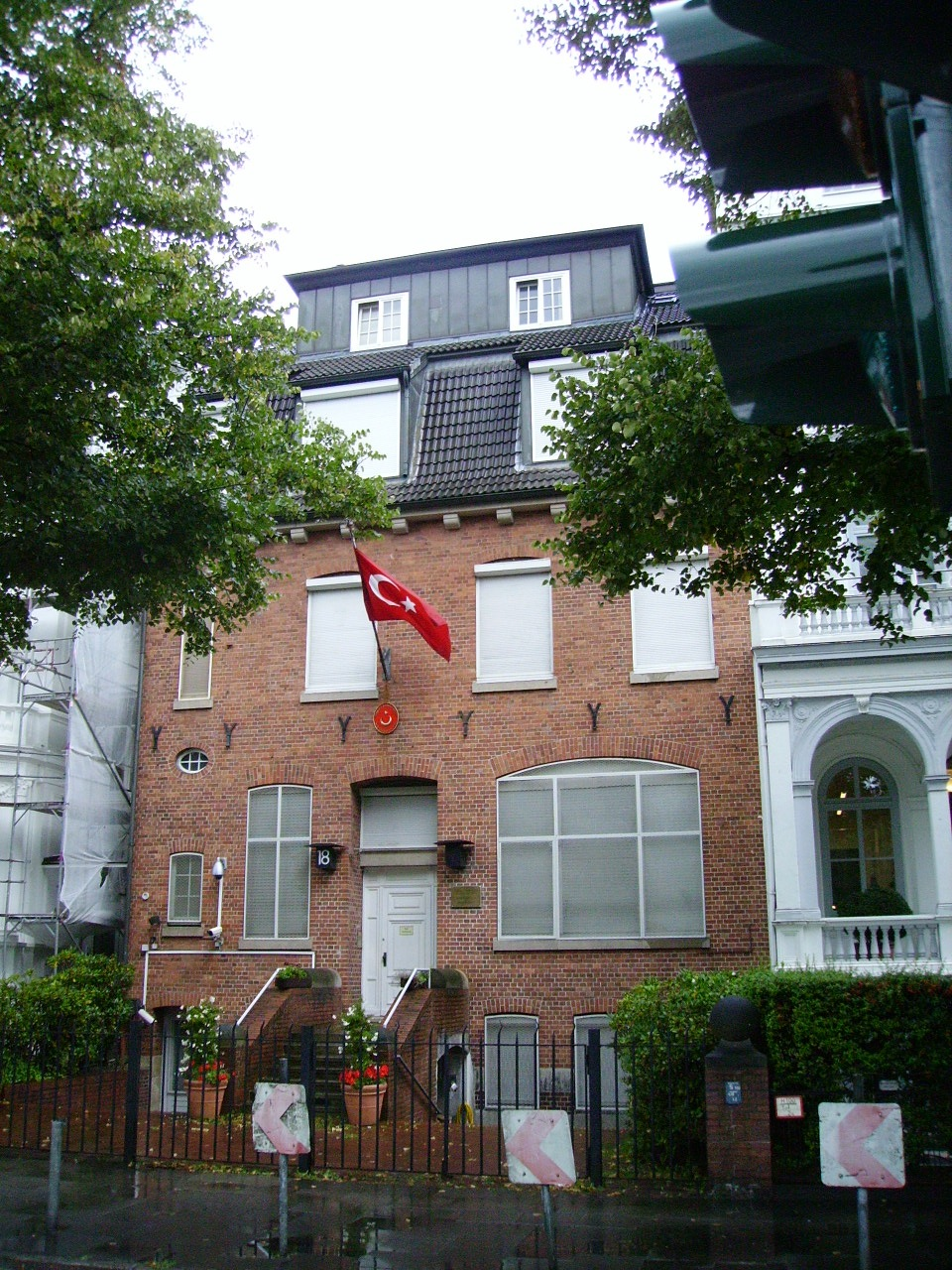
Consulate-General of Turkey in Hamburg

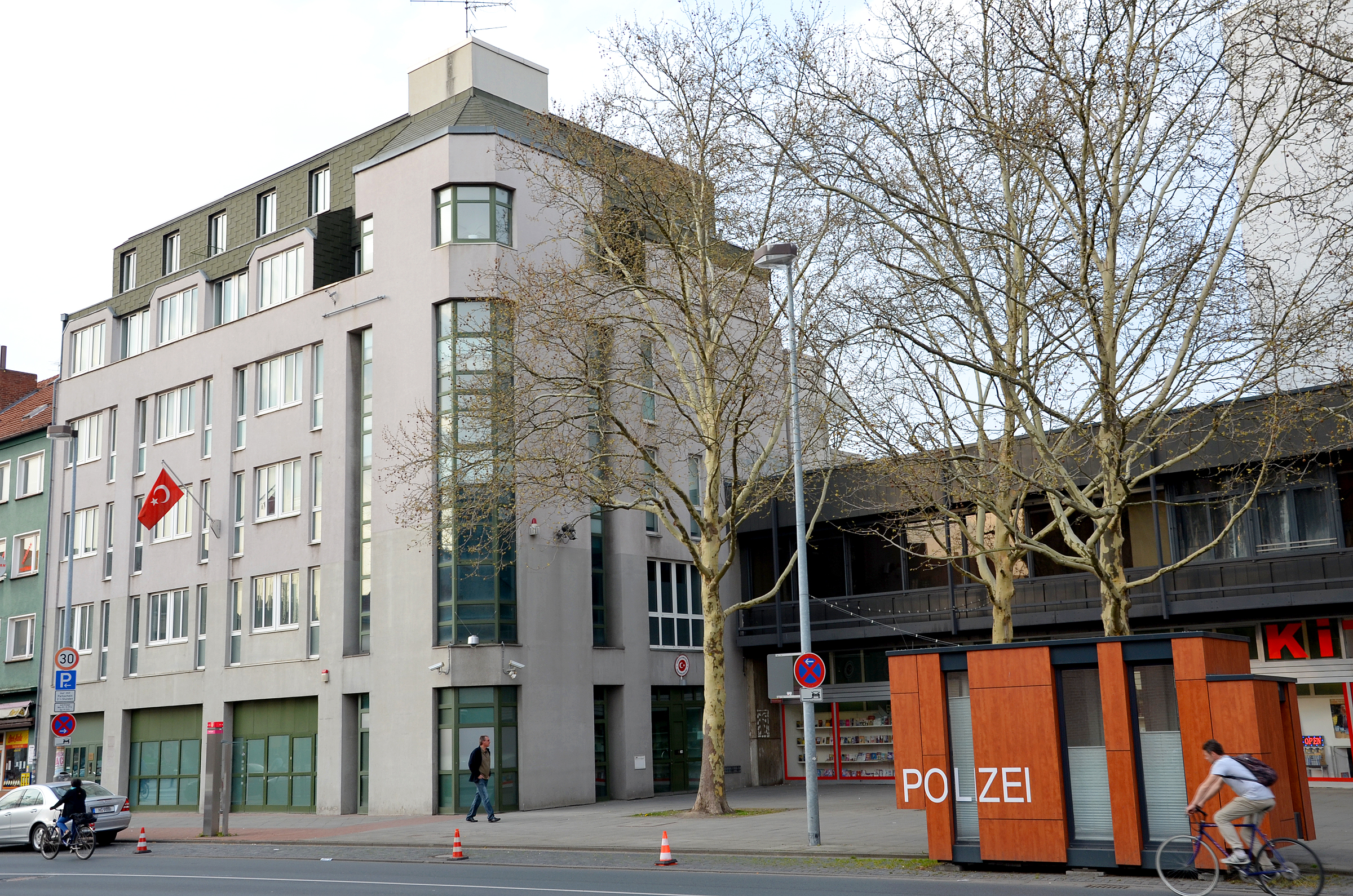
Consulate-General of Turkey in Hanover

== Country comparison ==
	Germany	Turkey
Population	84,388,654	85,814,871
Area	357,021 km^{2} (137,847 sq mi)	783,356 km2 (302,455 sq mi)
Population density	229/km^{2} (593/sq mi)	102/km2 (264.2/sq mi)
Capital	Berlin	Ankara
Largest city	Berlin – 3,769,495 (6,144,600 Metro)	Istanbul – 15,214,177 (5,343.220 Metro)
Global cities	Berlin, Munich, Dortmund, Frankfurt, Nuremberg, Hamburg, Düsseldorf, Cologne, Gelsenkirchen, Bremen, Hanover, Bonn, Leverkusen, Mannheim, Bochum, Stuttgart, Karlsruhe, Cottbus, Mönchengladbach, Darmstadt, Rostock, Wiesbaden, Potsdam, Münster, Essen, Osnabrück	Ankara, Istanbul, İzmir, Antalya, Bursa, Trabzon, Erzurum, Gaziantep, Kocaeli, Sakarya, Muğla, Diyarbakır, Kayseri, Sivas, Mardin, Eskişehir, Malatya, Edirne, Afyonkarahisar, Kırklareli, Denizli, Mersin, Tekirdağ, Adana, Şanlıurfa, Konya
Government	Federal parliamentary constitutional republic	Unitary presidential constitutional republic
Official language	German	Turkish
Current leader	President Frank-Walter Steinmeier; Chancellor Friedrich Merz	President Recep Tayyip Erdoğan; Vice President Cevdet Yılmaz
Main religions	58% Christianity, 37% non-religious, 4% Islam, 1% other	89.5% Islam, 8.9% non-religious, 1.6% other
Ethnic groups	80% Germans, 5% Turks, 5% other Europeans, 10% other	85% Turkish, 9% Kurdish, 6% other
GDP (PPP)	$3.615 trillion, $50,206 per capita	$0.857 trillion ($10,848 per capita)

== See also ==
- Turkey–European Union relations
- Böhmermann affair
- Germans in Turkey
- Kars Germans
- Turks in Germany
- Turks in Europe
- Grey passport scandal
- European Union–NATO relations
- Islam in Germany
- Kurds in Germany
