= Germans in Turkey =

There are over 50,000 Germans living in Turkey, primarily Germans married to Turkish spouses, employees, retirees and long-term tourists who buy properties across the Turkish coastline, often spending most of the year in the country.

== History ==
Caucasus Germans inhabited the northeast of the country since 18th century. Especially in the city of Kars.

The officials and the artisans sent to Istanbul during the close relations with the Ottoman Empire at the time of Kaiser Wilhelm II formed the so-called Bosporus Germans. The Germans in this group returned home after the First World War.

In 1933, the rise to power of the Nazis caused the second wave of immigration from Germany to Turkey. It has been reported that the number of these “exiled Germans”, concentrated in Istanbul and Ankara, reached 800 (190 of whom were academics who took up positions at Turkish universities). See, for example, Curt Kosswig for an example of a German emigrant academic. He stayed in Turkey from 1937 to 1955.

== See also ==
- Germany–Turkey relations
- Bosporus Germans
- Kars Germans
