= Siege of Érsekújvár =

Siege of Érsekújvár may refer to:

- Siege of Érsekújvár (1621), took place during Gabriel Bethlen's Revolt
- Siege of Érsekújvár (1663), took place during the Austro-Turkish War (1663–64)
- Siege of Érsekújvár (1685), took place during the Great Turkish War
