= Battle of Sinsheim =

1674 battle

Coordinates: 49.2326°N 8.8076°E

- Part of Franco-Dutch War
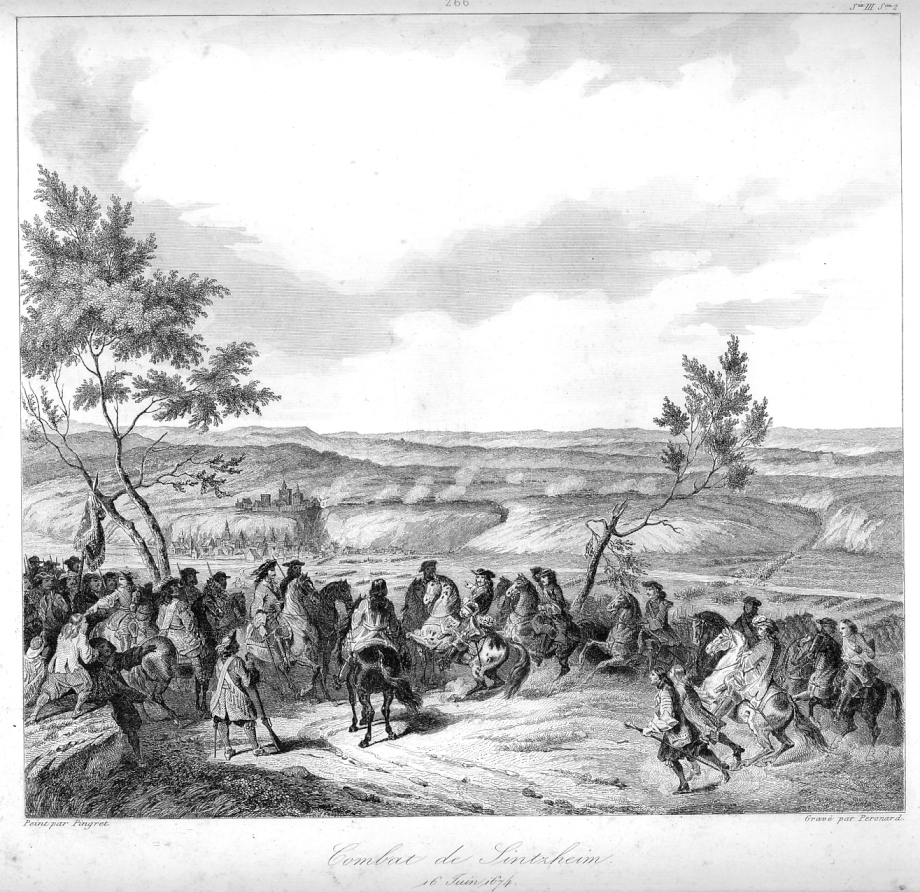
- Turenne's command post at Sinsheim
Date	16 June 1674
Location	Sinsheim, Baden-Württemberg, Germany
Result	French victory

Belligerents
Kingdom of France	Holy Roman Empire

Commanders and leaders
(Kingdom of France) Turenne	(Lorraine) Aeneas de Caprara

Strength
1,500 infantry, 6,000 cavalry	1,500 infantry, 7,000 cavalry

Casualties and losses
1,100–1,500 killed or wounded	2,000+ killed Unknown wounded 500 to 600 captured

The Battle of Sinsheim took place on 16 June 1674, near Sinsheim in modern Baden-Württemberg, then in the Holy Roman Empire. Part of the 1672 to 1678 Franco-Dutch War, a French army under Marshall Turenne defeated an Imperial force led by Aeneas de Caprara.

The war began in May 1672, when a French army invaded the Dutch Republic. In August 1673, the Dutch agreed an alliance with Emperor Leopold, opening a new theatre of operations in the Rhineland. For the 1674 campaign, Turenne was ordered to prevent Imperial troops entering the contested area of Alsace; facing a number of separate forces which outnumbered his in total, he sought to defeat his opponents piecemeal.

On 16 June 1674, Turenne intercepted a slightly larger Imperial detachment of around 8,500 men, on its way to join Alexander von Bournonville and their main army near Heidelberg. De Caprara managed to repulse the first two French assaults before withdrawing; although unable to prevent him linking up with von Bournonville, Turenne inflicted heavy casualties, and thereafter gained the strategic initiative in the campaign.

== Background ==
When the Franco-Dutch War began in May 1672, French troops quickly overran much of the Dutch Republic, but by July the Dutch position had stabilised. In addition, the unexpected success of his offensive encouraged Louis to make excessive demands, while concern at French gains brought the Dutch support from Brandenburg-Prussia, Emperor Leopold, and Charles II of Spain. In August 1673, the French army in the Rhineland under Turenne was faced by Imperial forces under Raimondo Montecuccoli who outmanoeuvred his opponent and helped the Dutch capture Bonn. Facing war on multiple fronts, Louis relinquished most of his earlier gains to consolidate his position along the French border with the Spanish Netherlands and in the Rhineland.

In January 1674, Denmark joined the anti-French coalition, followed by the February Treaty of Westminster, which ended the Third Anglo-Dutch War. The allies agreed to focus on expelling France from its remaining positions in the Netherlands, while an Imperial army opened a second front in Alsace. Louis appointed Turenne commander in Alsace and ordered him to prevent the Imperials breaking into Eastern France, or linking up with the Dutch. Since he could not expect reinforcements, the longer Turenne delayed, the worse his position became, and so he decided to take the offensive. He was helped in this since French armies of the period held significant advantages over their opponents; undivided command, talented generals, and vastly superior logistics. Reforms introduced by Louvois, the Secretary of War, meant they could mobilise much more quickly than their adversaries, and campaign for longer.

The main French objectives for 1674 were to retake the Franche-Comté and key fortresses along their border with the Spanish Netherlands. Turenne was tasked with preventing the Imperials entering Alsace but decided the best way to do that was to attack. On 14 June, he crossed the Rhine near Philippsburg, seeking to intercept an Imperial force under Aeneas de Caprara before it could link up with Alexander von Bournonville. On 16 June, Turenne caught Caprara outside Sinsheim and brought him to battle.

== Battle ==
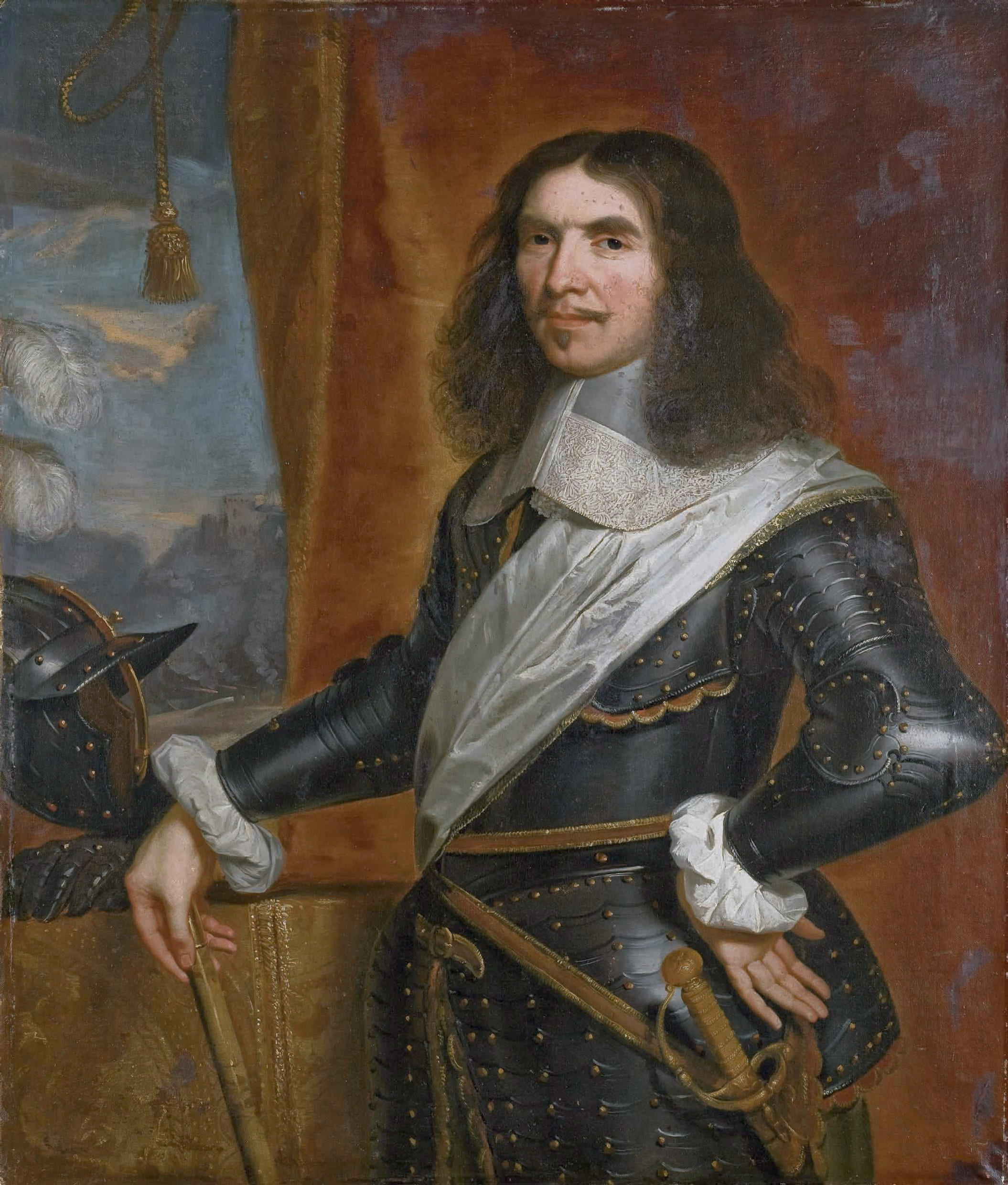
Turenne, French commander in the Rhineland

Caprara aligned his infantry along the hedgerows and gardens at the entrance of the village.

Turenne deployed his infantry and his dragoons on foot. They forced the outposts, crossed the Elsanz and entered Sinsheim. The Imperials retreated through the village and fell back on the plateau behind the village.

To reach the plateau, the French had to climb a narrow passage. Turenne positioned infantry and dragoons in the hedgerows flanking the narrow passage, as well as in the castle and in the vineyard. The French cavalry could then advance through the passage.

An enemy counter-attack was stopped by the covering fire of the French infantry. The Imperials were repelled from the plateau and withdrew. Turenne immediately left Sinsheim to monitor the bulk of the Imperial army, stationed on the Moselle.

There were 2,000 to 3,000 deaths, according to sources. The city was completely destroyed.

== Aftermath ==
The battle was only a limited success for Turenne, because both enemy forces succeeded in uniting near Heidelberg. On 1 July the Elector of Brandenburg also took up arms against France, and the Perpetual Diet of Regensburg declared war.

Turenne again crossed the Rhine and ravaged the Palatinate (July 1674), depriving the Imperials the resources to attack the Alsace.

== Sources ==
- Black, Jeremy (2011). Beyond the Military Revolution: War in the Seventeenth Century World. Palgrave Macmillan. ISBN 978-0230251564.
- Bodart, Gaston (1908). Militär-historisches Kriegs-Lexikon (1618-1905).
- Chandler, David G (1979). Marlborough as Military Commander (2nd, illustrated ed.). Batsford. ISBN 978-0713420753.
- De Périni, Hardÿ (1896). Batailles françaises, Volume V (in French). Ernest Flammarion.
- Guthrie, William P. (2003). The Later Thirty Years War: From the Battle of Wittstock to the Treaty of Westphalia (Contributions in Military Studies). Praeger. ISBN 978-0313324086.
- Hutton, Ronald (1989). Charles II King of England, Scotland and Ireland. Clarendon Press. ISBN 978-0198229117.
- Lynn, John (1999). The Wars of Louis XIV, 1667-1714 (Modern Wars In Perspective). Longman. ISBN 978-0582056299.;
- Zabecki, David, ed. (2014). Germany at War: 400 Years of Military History. ABC-CLIO. ISBN 978-1598849806.
- Longueville, Thomas (1907). Marshal Turenne. Robarts - University of Toronto. London: Longmans, Green.

- Périni, Hardÿ de (1896). Batailles françaises, Volume V (in French). Ernest Flammarion.
