= Embassy of Turkey, Berlin =

- Türkische Botschaft in Berlin
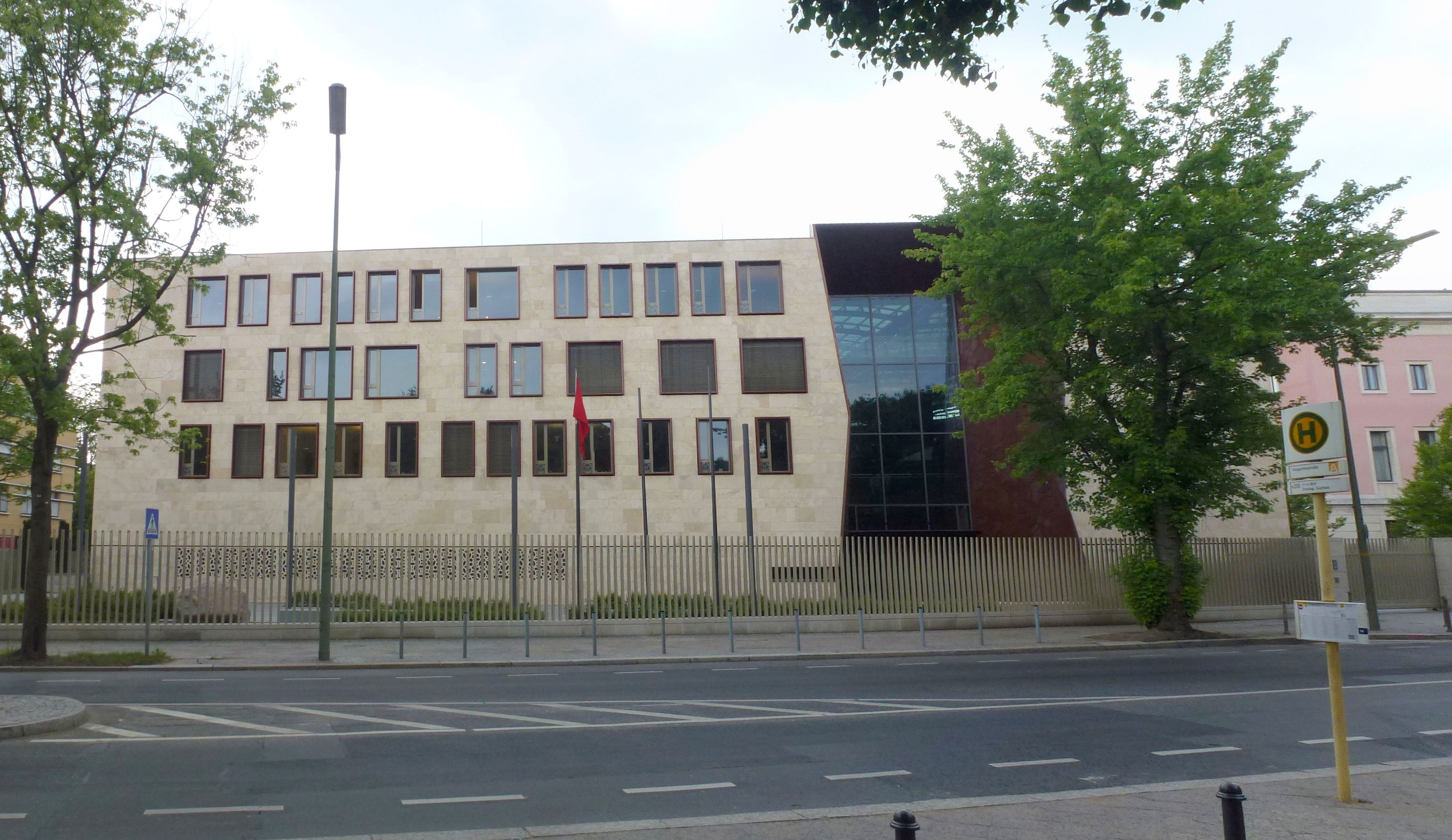
- The new building of Turkish Embassy in Berlin
- Interactive map of the Embassy of Turkey, Berlin area
- Alternative names: Türkiye Cumhuriyeti Berlin Büyükelçiliği

General information
- Location: Tiergartenstraße - Hildebranstraße, Berlin, Germany
- Coordinates: 52.50944°N 13.36079°E
- Groundbreaking: October 2010
- Construction started: July 2011
- Completed: October 2012
- Inaugurated: October 30, 2012
- Cost: EUR 30 million
- Owner: Turkish State

Design and construction
- Architects: Thomas Hillig, Volkmar Nickol and Felipe Schmidt

The Embassy of Turkey in Berlin maintains diplomatic relations and represents Turkey's interests in dealing with the German government. Currently, Ahmet Başar Şen is the ambassador of Turkey to Germany.

== History ==
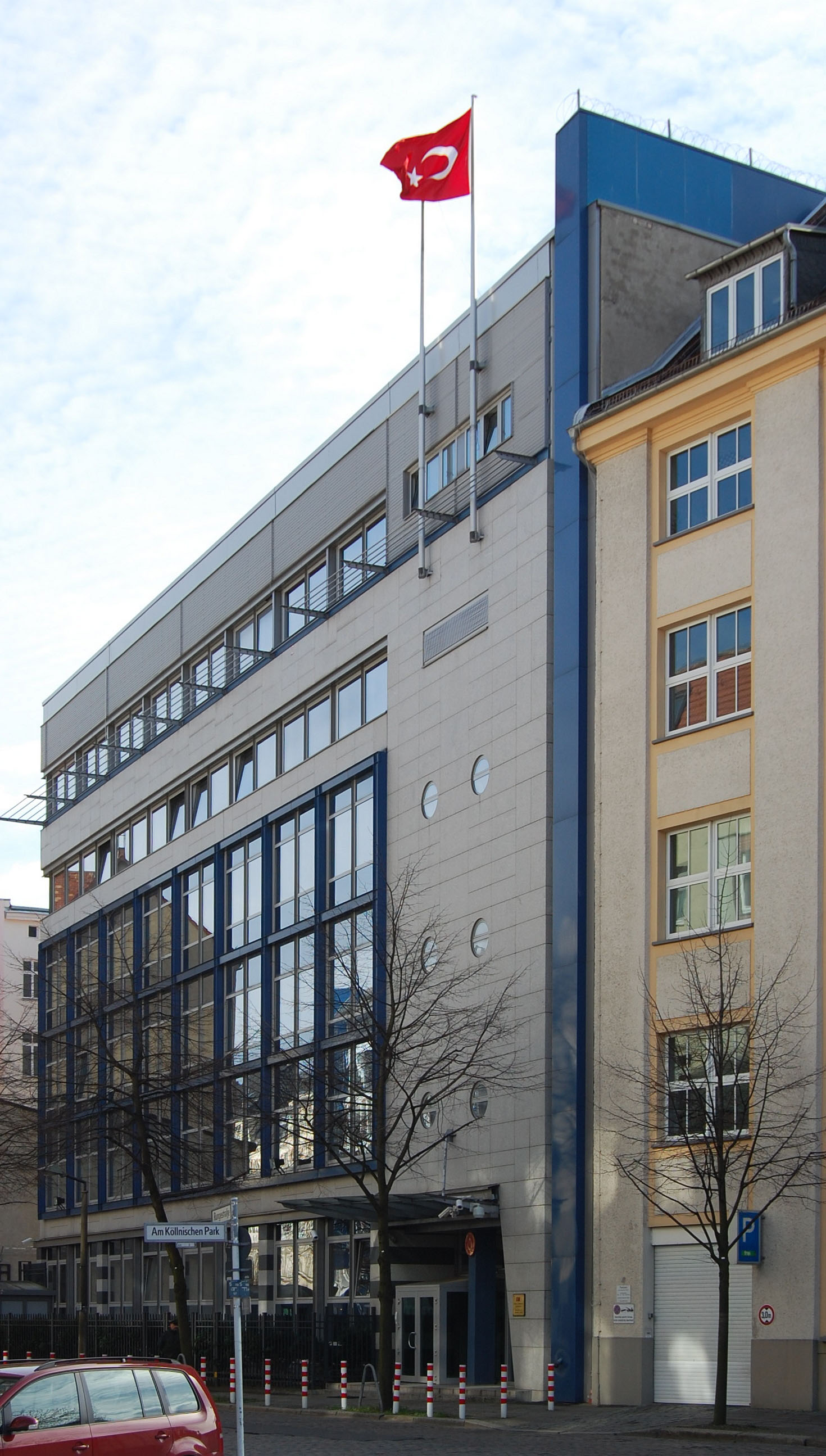
Former Turkish Embassy building in Berlin used between 1999 and 2012

Situated on the crossing of Tiergartenstraße with Hildebranstraße, the first embassy building was purchased by the Ottoman Empire in 1918, and was used until the dissolution of the Ottoman Empire.

The building served for the Turkish Republic's embassy between 1929 and 1944. It was destroyed during the last days of World War II in Allied air raids and street fighting.

With the establishment of the Federal Republic of Germany and the relocation of its capital to Bonn, the Turkish Embassy moved to Bad Godesberg. The Embassy of Turkey was based in Bonn from 1950 to 1999 when Berlin regained its capital status after the reunification of Germany.

From 1999 to 2012, the embassy quartered in a rented six-storey building in Berlin.

== New building ==
On October 30, 2012, a new embassy building, constructed on the site of the destroyed building, was opened with a ceremony attended by high ranked politicians such as the Turkish Prime Minister Recep Tayyip Erdoğan, Minister of Foreign Affairs Ahmet Davutoğlu, Minister for the European Union Egemen Bağış and Foreign Minister of Germany Guido Westerwelle as well as some 1,500 guests. The architecture of the building symbolises the situation of Turkey as a bridge between Asia and Europe.

== Technical details ==
The groundbreaking took place in October 2010. The construction began in July 2011 and was completed in October 2012. It cost EUR 30 million.

The building's floor area is 3,900 m^{2} (42,000 sq ft), and it covers a total area of 10,000 m^{2} (110,000 sq ft) including the parking lot. It is the biggest diplomatic mission of Turkey.

The embassy complex, designed by German architects Thomas Hillig and his colleagues Volkmar Nickol, Felipe Schmidt, consists of two blocks connected with an atrium. While one of the blocks is reserved for the ambassador's office and reception areas, the second block contains office space for 100 staff.

There is a conference hall with tiered seating for 110 people, where video shows can be held. Another conference and ball room can hold 800 guests, which is situated in a glass-roofed gallery (atrium) between the two blocks. With opening of its doors, the atrium transforms into a multi-purpose hall having a capacity of around 2,000 people. The gallery is decorated with nine pieces of stained glass, created by Turkish artist Bedri Rahmi Eyüboğlu (1911–1975) and brought from the former embassy building in Bonn.

The portal of the building is made of copper plates, which were taken off the embassy building's front door in Bonn. The glass of the interior and exterior windows is engraved with girih interlacing ornaments found in historical Seljuk art.

== See also ==
- Germany–Turkey relations
- List of diplomatic missions of Turkey
