= German–Turkish Treaty of Friendship =

1941 treaty between Germany and Turkey

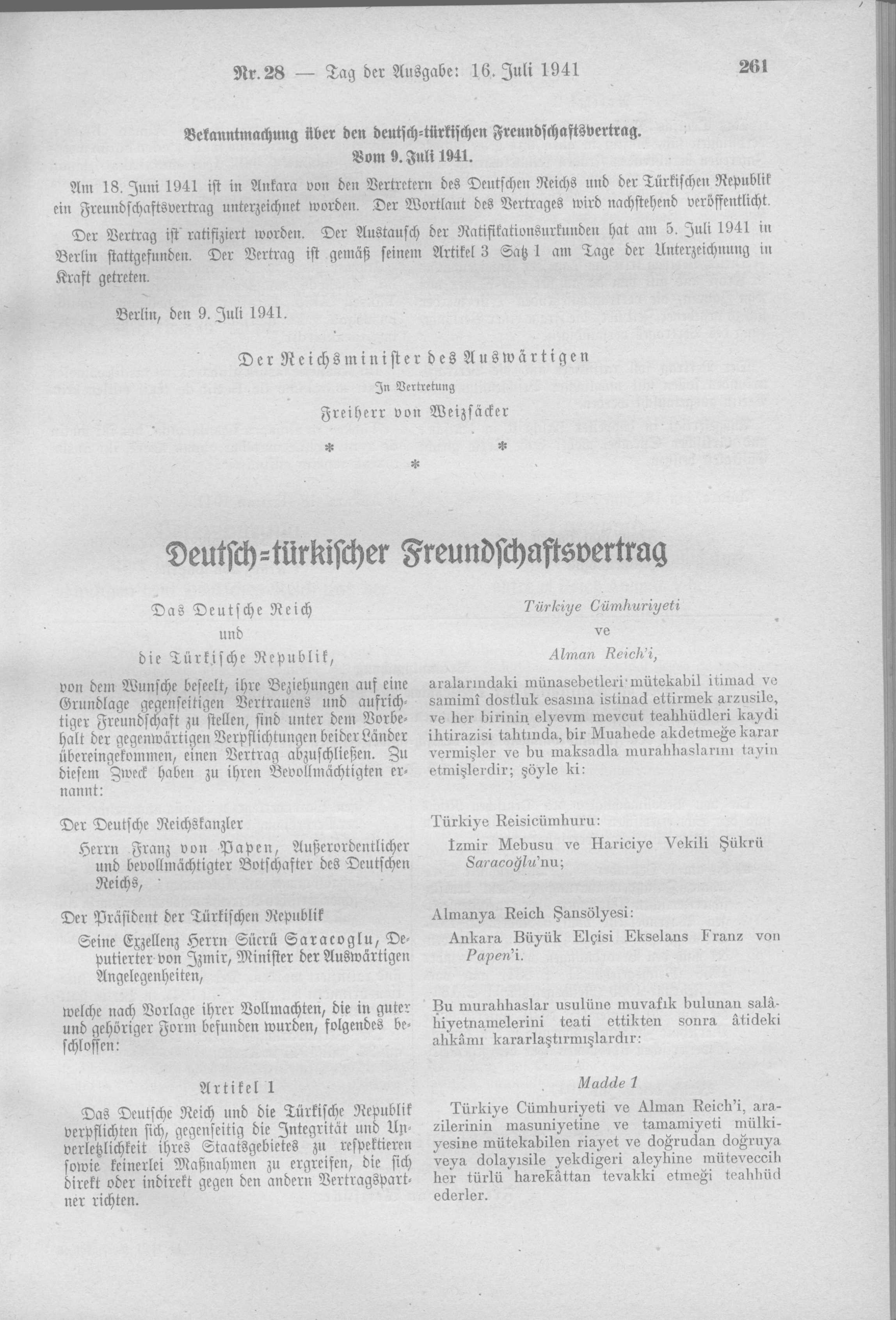
The German-Turkish Treaty of Friendship of 1941

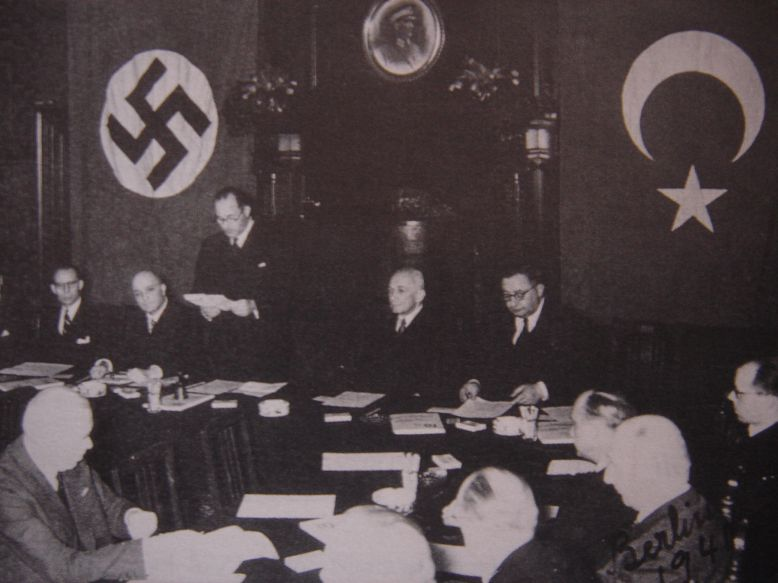
The two sides signing the pact

The German–Turkish Treaty of Friendship (German: Türkisch-Deutscher Freundschaftsvertrag, Turkish: Türk-Alman Dostluk Paktı) was a non-aggression pact signed between Nazi Germany and Turkey on 18 June 1941 in Ankara by German ambassador to Turkey Franz von Papen and Turkish Minister of Foreign Affairs Şükrü Saracoğlu. It went into effect on the same day.

== Terms ==
A short two-page document containing only three articles, the treaty stated that:

- Article 1 – Germany and Turkey agree to respect each other's territorial integrity and inviolability of borders and shall not take any measures, direct or indirect, contrary thereto.
- Article 2 – Germany and Turkey agree to communicate with each other on friendly terms regarding matters of common interest in order to come to a mutual understanding thereof.
- Article 3 – The treaty shall come into force on the day of signing, and shall be valid for a period of ten years.

Despite the pact stipulating that it was to last for ten years, Turkey severed its diplomatic and commercial relations with Germany in August 1944, and on 23 February 1945 Turkey declared war on Nazi Germany. The pact was dissolved on 24 October 1945, after the fall of the Third Reich, when Turkey joined the United Nations.

== Geopolitical context ==
After the outbreak of World War II in 1939, Turkish President İsmet İnönü pursued a policy of neutrality, tried to avoid involvement in the war and sought to acquire military equipment from both the Axis powers and the Allies. Germany tried to draw Turkey away from Britain by using diplomatic efforts.

As Germany was preparing to invade Yugoslavia and Greece in April 1941, Axis troops massed along the Bulgarian border and demanded permission to transit through its territory. On 1 March 1941, inspired by irredentist claims to territory in Greece (East Macedonia and Thrace) and Yugoslavia (Vardar Macedonia), Bulgaria signed the Tripartite Pact with the Axis powers.

On 4 March 1941, Franz von Papen forwarded a letter from Adolf Hitler to İnönü in which Hitler wrote that he had not started the war and did not intend to attack Turkey. Further, Hitler emphasised that he had ordered his troops in Bulgaria to stay far from the Turkish border to avoid making a false impression of their presence. Hitler proposed a non-aggression pact with Turkey.

On 6 April, Axis troops attacked Yugoslavia (in Operation 25) and soon after Greece (in Operation Marita) through Bulgaria. Yugoslavia surrendered on 17 April, by June 1, Greece was also defeated and the Nazis allowed Bulgaria to occupy much of the territory in both countries it had claimed.

In the meantime, on 1 April 1941, Rashid Ali Al-Gaylani launched a coup d'état, which overthrew the pro-British regime in Iraq. The four generals leading the revolt worked closely with German intelligence and accepted military aid from Germany. Hitler asked Turkey for permission to pass through its territory to render military aid to Iraq. In exchange, the Turkish government demanded border concessions from Iraq. On April 18, while the negotiations were still taking place, British forces invaded Iraq, by June 3 the coup was defeated and the regime of Emir Abdul-Illah (regent of four-year-old King Faisal II) restored. With the border issue now moot, the German–Turkish Treaty of Friendship was signed on 18 June 1941.

In August 1944, Turkey severed diplomatic and commercial relations with Germany. On 23 February 1945, Turkey declared war on Germany.

== Clodius Agreement ==
In October 1941, Turkey and Germany signed the Clodius Agreement (Note: So named after the German negotiator and diplomat, Carl August Clodius.) in which Turkey agreed to export up to 45,000 tons of chromite ore to Germany in 1941 and in 1942, and 90,000 tons of the mineral in both 1943 and 1944, contingent on Germany in return supplying military equipment to Turkey. Germany would provide as many as 117 railway locomotives and 1,250 freight rail cars to transport the ore.

In an attempt to prevent the supply of the strategic mineral from reaching Germany, both the United States and the U.K. went on a buying spree, purchasing Turkish chromite even if they did not need it. As part of the "package deal", the Anglo-Americans also bought Turkish dried fruit and tobacco.

== See also ==
- Anti-Comintern Pact
- Germany–Turkey relations
- World War II
