= Aeneas de Caprara =

Austrian Field Marshal

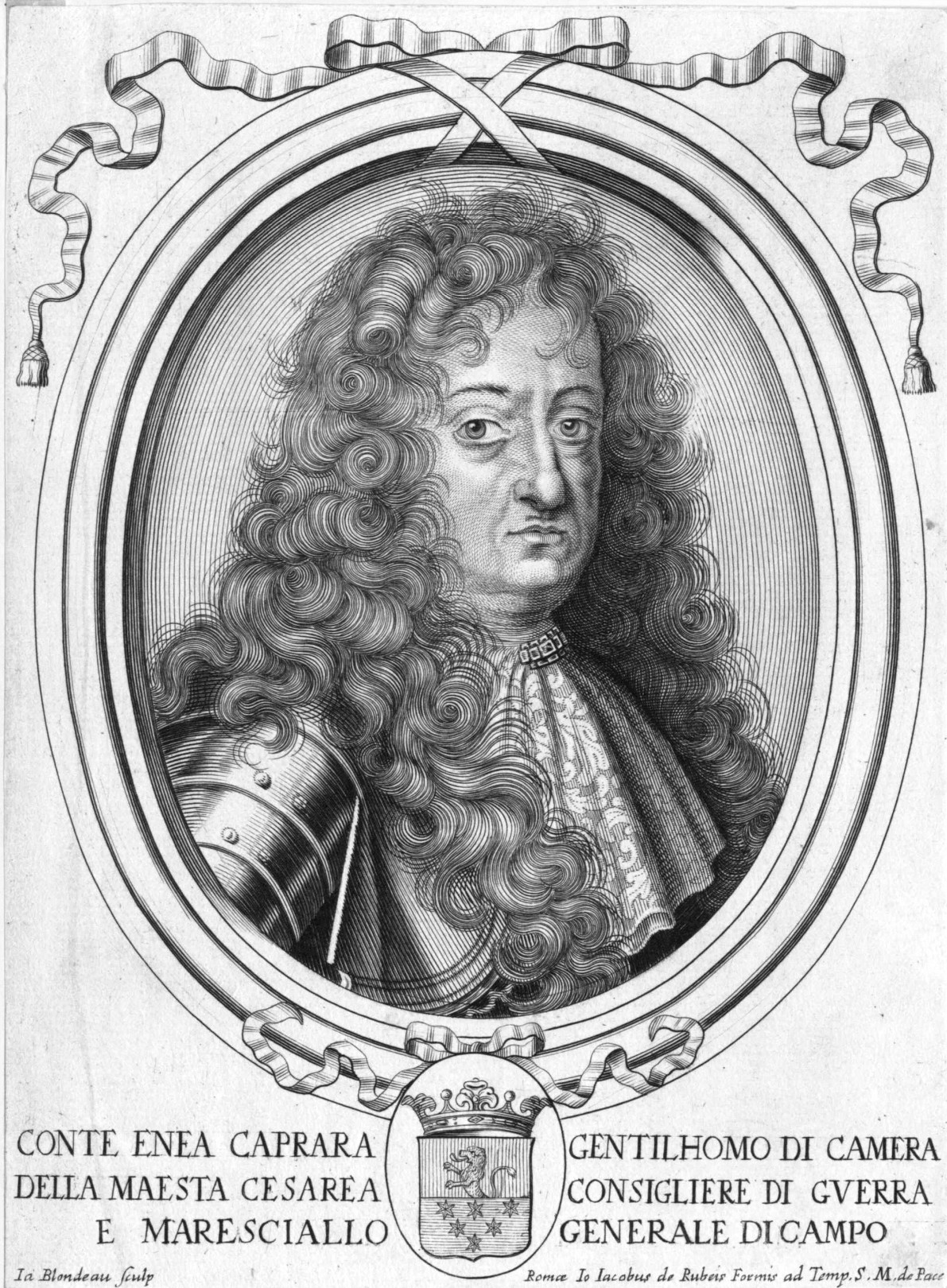
Count Aeneas Sylivius de Caprara (Enea Silvio de Caprara), imperial field marshal, engraving by G.G. Rossi.

Count Aeneas Sylvius de Caprara (1631 – February 1701), also known as Enea Silvio or Äneas Sylvius von Caprara, was an Austrian field marshal during the Nine Years' War.

== Early life ==
Born at Bologna to count Niccolò Caprara, he was a descendant of generals Raimondo Montecuccoli and Ottavio Piccolomini.

== Career ==
=== Involvement in the Dutch War ===
He served under Charles V, Duke of Lorraine during the Dutch War at the Battles of Sinsheim, Enzheim, and Mulhouse where he was subsequently captured. Later released, Caprara would relieve the siege at Offenburg in 1677, before the war's end the following year.

=== Involvement in the Great Turkish War ===
In 1683, during the Great Turkish War, Caprara would again return to the service of Charles of Lorraine against the Turkish advance into Hungary soon winning distinction after the siege and capture of Neuhaeusel from 7 July to 17 August 1685.

=== Involvement in the Nine Year's War ===
At the start of the Nine Years' War, Caprara was appointed commander-in-chief of Imperial forces in northern Italy where, in 1692, he was involved in the campaign to capture the Dauphiné. Transferred to Hungary two years later, Caprara would remain commander-in-chief of Imperial forces in the region until his retirement in 1696, serving as vice president of the Imperial War Council until his death in February 1701.
