= Deniz Yücel =

German-Turkish journalist and publisher (born 1973)

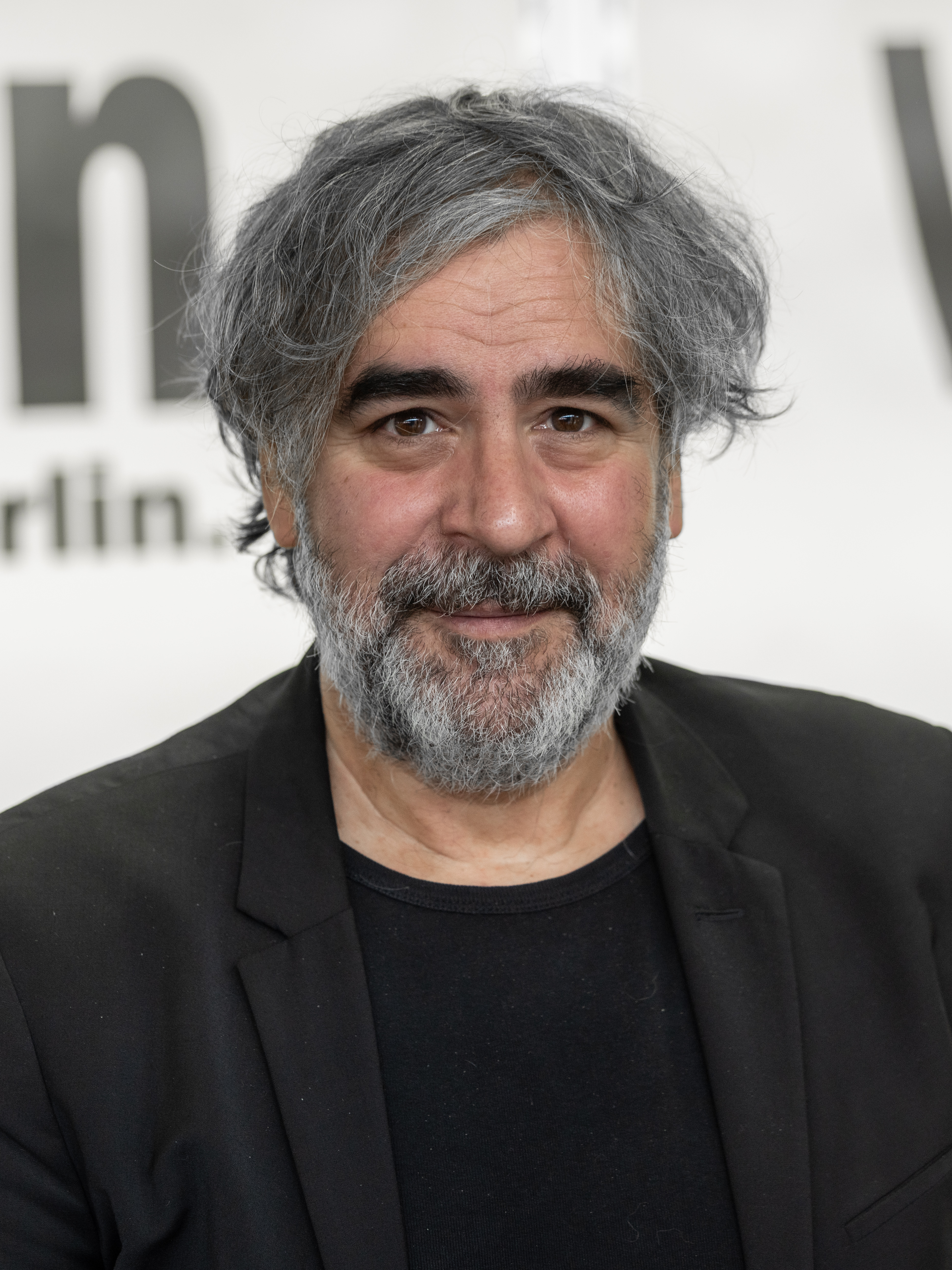
- Yücel at the Frankfurt Book Fair 2025
- Born: 10 September 1973 (age 52); Flörsheim am Main, West Germany
- Occupation: Journalist
- Spouse: Dilek Mayatürk (m. 2017)

Deniz Yücel (Turkish pronunciation: [deˈniz jyˈdʒæl]; born 10 September 1973) is a German-Turkish journalist and publisher. He has been a contributor to several German publications, most notably Die Tageszeitung and Die Welt.

In February 2017, he was imprisoned by the Turkish government, which claimed he was a spy. He was released in February 2018, and the courts ruled his incarceration to be an unlawful violation of his human rights.

== Espionage accusations and imprisonment ==
The Turkish government repeatedly accused Yücel of espionage on behalf of Germany's federal intelligence agency, the Bundesnachrichtendienst, and in support of the alleged terrorist organizations FETÖ and PKK. The government further claimed that Yücel aided these two groups in inciting violence in Turkey. In a speech in 2017, Turkish President Recep Tayyip Erdogan declared that Yücel "is a spy, not a journalist".

On 14 February 2017, Yücel was formally indicted by a Turkish court and imprisoned for espionage. His incarceration was widely criticized by journalists, politicians, and the German public. Sigmar Gabriel, the German Minister of Foreign Affairs, immediately summoned the Turkish ambassador to the Foreign Office to protest Yücel's imprisonment.

Yücel received strong public and political support in Germany throughout his imprisonment such as that by Cem Özdemir or that of the popular Twitter hashtag #FreeDeniz campaign. The German newspaper Die Welt, for which Yücel is a correspondent, offered to forward letters of support to the journalist. It also published Yücel's prison address in Turkey and suggested that letters written in Turkish could be sent directly to the journalist's prison cell. The Prison letter reading commission at times only let him read the letters of his mother-in-law, but not those of his wife.

On 16 February 2018, just over a year after his imprisonment began, Yücel was released.

On 28 June 2019, the Constitutional Court of Turkey ruled that the detention of Yücel had been unlawful.

On 25 January 2022, the European Court of Human Rights (ECHR) ruled that Turkey had violated Deniz Yücel's human rights. The court ruled that Yücel's pre-trial detention violated his rights in three cases, including his right to liberty and security, right to compensation for unlawful detention, as well as freedom of expression.

== Works ==
- Taksim ist überall. Die Gezi-Bewegung und die Zukunft der Türkei. 2014, ISBN 978-3-89401-791-0.
- Und morgen die ganze Türkei. Der lange Aufstieg des Recep Tayyip Erdoğan, in: Kursbuch 188, 27 November 2016 (excerpts here).
- Wir sind ja nicht zum Spaß hier. Edition Nautilus, Hamburg 2018, ISBN 978-3-96054-073-1
- Agentterrorist. Eine Geschichte über Freiheit und Freundschaft, Demokratie und Nichtsodemokratie. Kiepenheuer & Witsch, Cologne 2019, ISBN 978-3-462-05278-7

== See also ==
- Censorship in Turkey
- List of arrested journalists in Turkey
- Germany–Turkey relations
- Turkey's media purge after the failed July 2016 coup d'état
