= Bosporus Germans =

Ethnic Germans living and settled in Istanbul, Turkey

Bosporus Germans were ethnic Germans who lived in Istanbul from the second half of the 19th century.

Even before then there was evidence of a strong German presence in the city. For example, the Taksim German Hospital, founded by three nurses, started receiving patients in 1852. Today many German expatriates live in the city although they would not call themselves true Bosporus Germans.

== Nineteenth century ==
The first generation came a few decades before and (especially) during the three political visits of Kaiser Wilhelm II to Constantinople (Istanbul), the capital city of the Ottoman Empire (on 21 October 1889, and on 5 October 1898, as the guest of Sultan Abdülhamid II; and on 15 October 1917, as the guest of Sultan Mehmed V). Most of the initial German settlers in Istanbul were craftsmen, industrialists and soldiers. Baron Colmar Freiherr von der Goltz, also known as Goltz Pasha, who was the chief advisor of the Ottoman Army from 1883 to 1896; and General Otto Liman von Sanders, who was a successful commander of the Ottoman Army during World War I, may be the most famous of them in the military field.

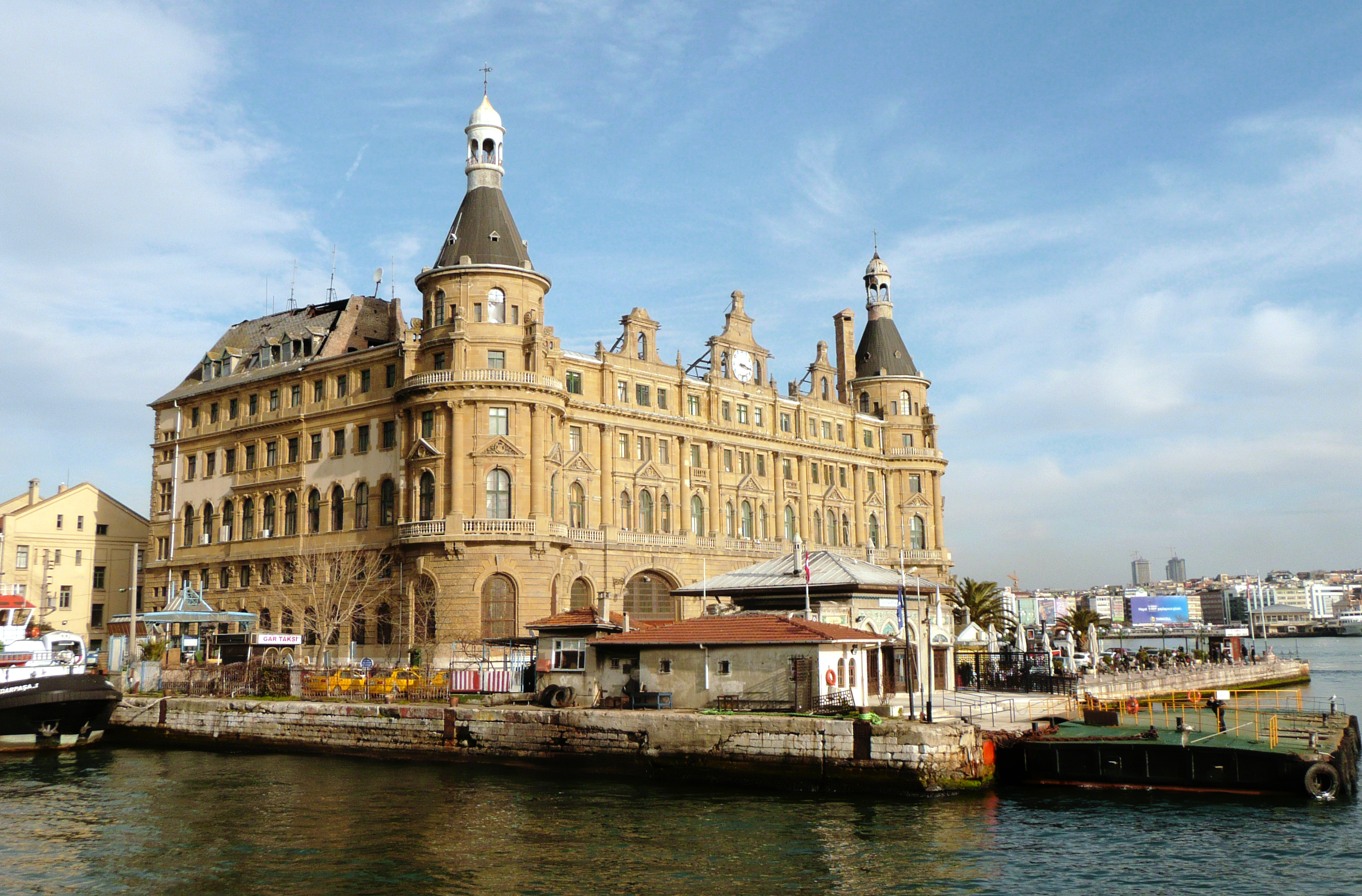
Haydarpaşa Terminal

In 1890 the German architect August Jachmund designed Sirkeci Railway Station on the European side of Istanbul and the nearby Deutsche Orient Bank Headquarters, also in the Sirkeci quarter, during the last year of Otto von Bismarck's chancellorship (1889–90). Haydarpaşa Railway Station, on the Asian side of Istanbul, was also designed by a German architect in 1908. The German engineers and craftsmen working on Haydarpaşa Station also established a small German colony in nearby Yeldeğirmeni (now a neighbourhood of Kadıköy). Both these train stations played a vital role in the Berlin-Istanbul-Baghdad Railway project, which would enhance economic and political ties between the German and Ottoman empires and allow Germany to bypass the British-controlled Suez Canal to reach the lucrative markets and resources of the Orient.

The German Fountain in the Hippodrome was built in 1900 to commemorate the visit of the Kaiser to Constantinople. Some of the most beautiful Bosporus villas, such as the Krupp and Huber Villas, were also designed by Germans.

Many Germans in Istanbul supported the Young Turk movement of the early-20th century and nurtured the Young Turks' relationship with the Social Democratic Party of Germany (SPD) as well as with the German Liberals around Friedrich Naumann (1860–1919). From the circle around Naumann came Ernest Jäckh (1875–1959), a purveyor of Young Turk propaganda (and later professor at Columbia University.) Jäckh however did not live in Constantinople for long and so can't be considered a true "Bosporus German". Another visitor to Constantinople during the First World War was Theodor Heuss, a friend of Naumann and Jäckh, who designed the German Cultural Centre there and later became the first Federal President of Germany (in office from 1949 until 1959). Active Social Democrats in Constantinople included Alexander Parvus (1867–1924) (who lived in the city from 1910 to 1914), and Dr. Friedrich Schrader (1865–1922) (known as "İştiraki" {translation: Socialist}, who lived there from 1891 to 1918.

In his book Flüchtlingsreise, Schrader describes the preliminary end of the German community in Istanbul, when Article 19 of the 1918 ceasefire agreement between the Ottoman Empire and the Entente powers decreed that Germans and Austrians were to be expelled within one month. In December 1918 Germans were detained on the steamer Corcovado, formerly the floating HQ of the German Mittelmeerdivision. Some, like Schrader, tried to avoid detention and deportation by fleeing to Germany via Odessa and war-torn Ukraine. A few Germans were allowed to stay, including Paul Lange (1857–1919), the Master of the Sultan's Music, and his immediate family, who were however deported in May 1920 shortly after Lange was buried with great pomp in Istanbul in a state funeral, one of the last major events of the dying Ottoman Sultanate.

== Twentieth century ==
A second generation of Germans arrived in İstanbul as refugees fleeing the Third Reich. The former Mayor of Berlin Ernst Reuter (1889–1953) and his son Edzard, later the president of Daimler-Chrysler, are two of the best known. Austrian architect Clemens Holzmeister (1886–1983) also lived in effective exile in Turkey. Many poorer Germans lived in Anatolia in poverty and despair. They were known as Haymatloz (in German: Heimatlos for homelandless) because of a stamp printed in their passports by the Turkish authorities.

The architect Bruno Taut arrived in Istanbul in 1936, settled in the city and built a pagoda-like house for himself in the hills above Ortaköy in 1938.

== Twenty-first century ==
Currently Istanbul is home to a "third generation" of German expatriates, including the football trainer Christoph Daum (1953- ).

The Deutsche Schule Istanbul (1868) and St. George's Austrian High School (1882) are still well-attended German-language schools while the Istanbul Lisesi (1884) teaches in German as the primary foreign language and is recognised as a Deutsche Auslandsschule (German international school) by Germany.

However, the current generation of German residents of Istanbul are not 'Bosporus Germans' in the original sense of the world.
