= Grey passport scandal =

Human trafficking scheme in Turkey

The Grey passport scandal refers to a human trafficking scheme facilitated through the issuing of so-called Grey Passports usually provided to Turkish diplomats and other civil servants to travel abroad without fulfilling the visa requirements. With such passports, it is estimated that several thousand Turkish citizens travelled abroad disguised as public civil servants and did not return. The scandal began with an article focusing in a case of 43 people who have been smuggled out of Turkey over the Municipality of Malatya by means of this scheme, published in the Turkish newspaper Habertürk in April 2021. The Turkish Interior Minister Süleyman Soylu admitted that several hundred of the recipients of Grey Passports did not return after their passports were invalidated and the Ministry of the Interior suspended the issuing of Grey Passports in order to prevent further human trafficking.

== Modus operandi ==
In the first reported case in Malatya, a person in Germany of Turkish descent, invited Turkish citizens to attend an ecologic event which later would not take place. The immigrants would have to pay between 6000 and 8000 Euros to participate in the journey and most would disperse upon their arrival to Germany. It soon emerged that a similar method was applied in other Turkish Municipalities as well. The passports would be withdrawn once the illegal immigrants arrived in Germany. The fact that people who wouldn't be able to receive a legal passport, were able to obtain an apparently legally issued diplomatic grey passport, raised suspicions that the scheme was operating with some complicity from within the Turkish Ministry of the Interior, which was responsible of the vetting process of the agencies allowed to release such passports.

=== Developments in Germany ===
In Germany, an investigation into the filer of invitations was initiated, thirty people were investigated for being involved in the trafficking scheme and more than a hundred Turkish immigrants are being investigated for having entered Germany illegally. In November 2021, one defendant who confessed of having received a request of assistance by the deputy Mayor of the Municipality in Korgan, Ordu was sentenced to a fine of 900 Euros. The Turkish consular official who detected the irregularities in the consulate of Hanover, was suspended from her duties and prohibited from entering the consulate again.

=== Developments in Turkey ===
Opposition politicians from the People's Democratic Party the Republican People's Party (CHP) and Good Party (IYI Party) demanded a clarification by the Turkish Government. Veli Agbaba, deputy for the oppositional Republican People's Party(CHP) accused the Justice and Development Party (AKP) led municipality of Bingöl to have incurred in such practices between 2014 and 2019. Meral Aksener of the Good party criticized the Government of the AKP for the economic situation which caused the people to search for a better environment abroad. A parliamentary investigation in the scandal was dismissed by the AKP and the ultra-nationalist Nationalist Movement Party (MHP). The scandal sparked investigations in dozens of municipalities in Turkey namely Bingöl, Malatya but also in the provinces of Elazig or Erzurum. As a result of an investigation into ninety municipalities, several officials were transferred. The majority of the investigated municipalities were governed by the AKP, three had a mayor of the CHP and one of the HDP.
