= Siege of Érsekújvár (1685) =

- Part of Great Turkish War
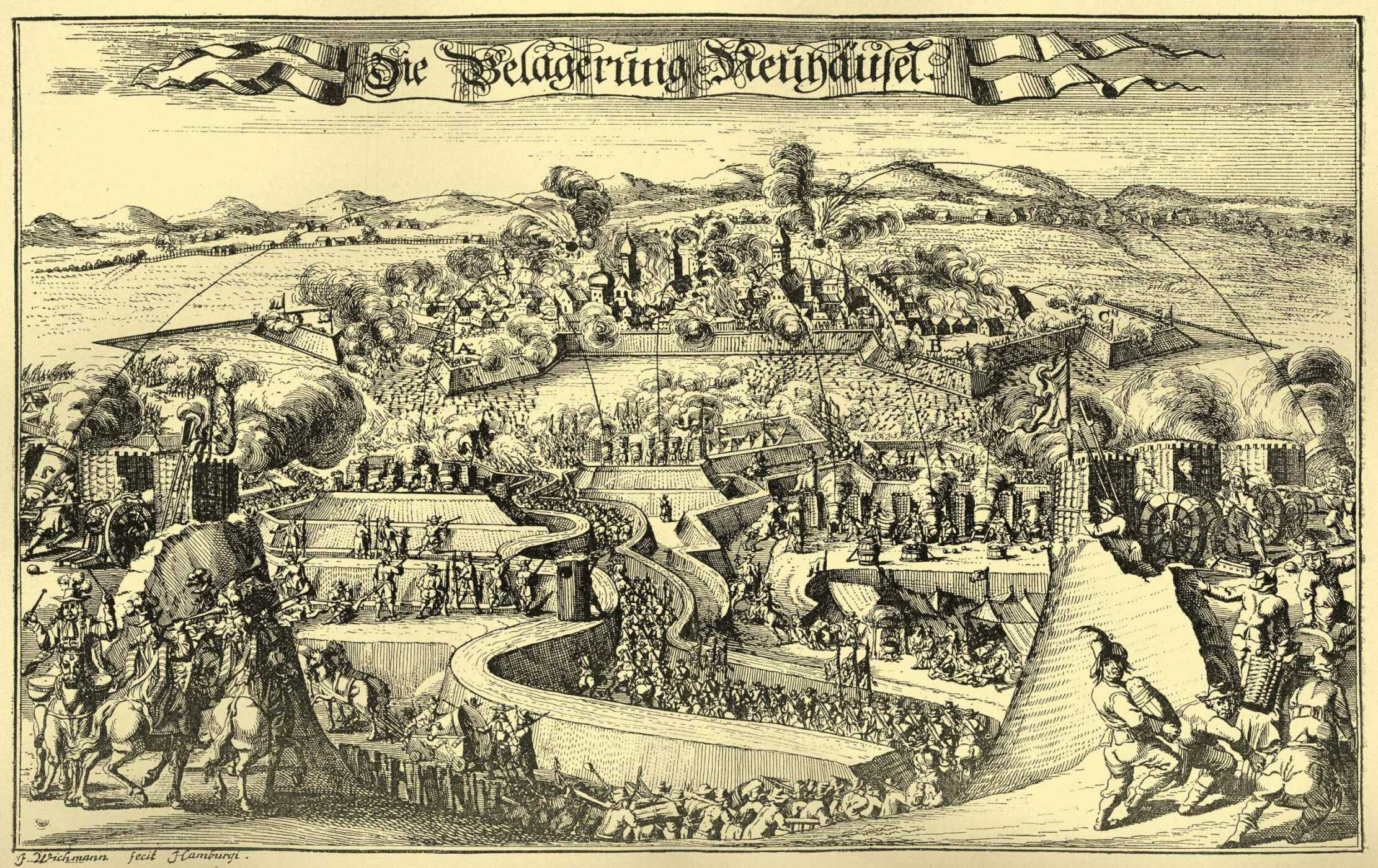
Date	July 7 – August 17, 1685
Location	Érsekújvár, Ottoman Empire (today: Nové Zámky, modern-day southwestern Slovakia)
Result	Holy Roman Empire victory

Belligerents
Holy Roman Empire	Ottoman Empire

Commanders and leaders
(Holy Roman Empire) Aeneas de Caprara	Unknown

Strength
15,000	3,000

Casualties and losses
Unknown	3,000 killed

The siege of Érsekújvár was fought between July 7 and August 17 of 1685, between the besieging Habsburg army and the Ottoman garrison of Érsekújvár, city in what is today Nové Zámky, Slovakia (Turkish: Uyvar). The Austrian commander, Aeneas de Caprara, invested the city and stormed it on August 17, slaying the entire Ottoman garrison.
