= Battle of the Faubourg St Antoine =

French battle

- Part of the Fronde
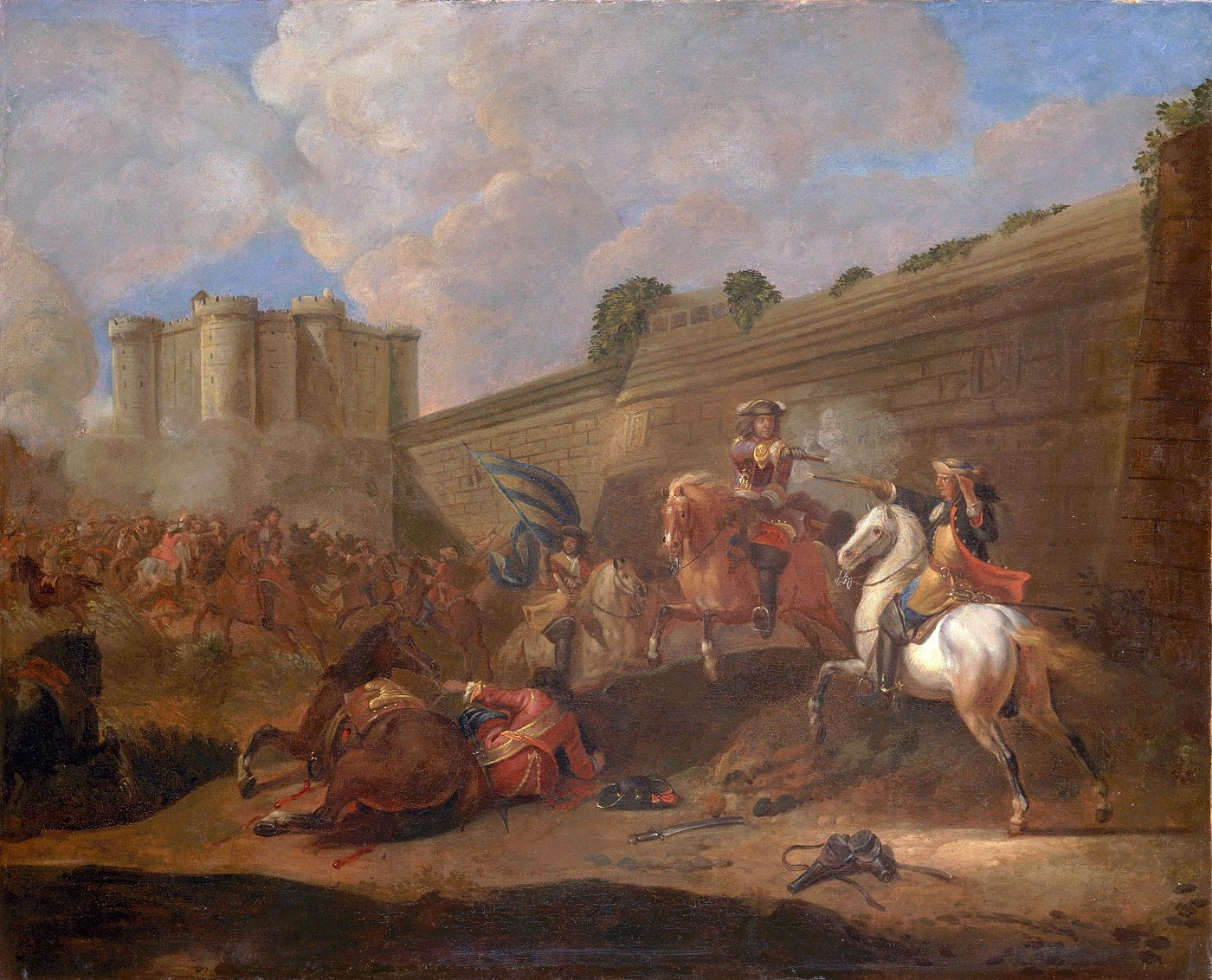
- A contemporary depiction of the battle of the Faubourg St Antoine beneath the walls of the Bastille in 1652
Date	2 July 1652
Location	Porte Saint-Antoine, Paris 48.853333°N 2.369167°E
Result	Royalist victory

Belligerents
(Kingdom of France) Royalists	Condé rebels

Commanders and leaders
(Kingdom of France) Henri de Turenne	Louis, Grand Condé

Strength
8,000	6,000

Casualties and losses
1,500	1,500
- Shown within Paris, France

The Battle of the Faubourg Saint Antoine occurred on 2 July 1652 during the Fronde rebellion in France. It is named after the Faubourg Saint-Antoine, a district near the Bastille in the east of Paris, where the battle took place.

== Details ==
During the period of the Second Fronde, between 1650 and 1653, Louis, the Prince of Condé, controlled much of Paris, having allied himself with the Parliament of Paris, which was in open rebellion against the Crown. French King Louis XIV had only recently reached the age of majority (on 7 September 1651), and Condé still claimed that the nefarious influence of Cardinal Mazarin rendered him incapable of rule. In the months before the battle, Condé had won a victory over the royalist forces at the Battle of Bléneau in April 1652, but was subsequently pressed back toward Paris by Turenne's larger army over the following weeks of manoeuvre around the capital.

On 2 July 1652, the battle of the Faubourg St Antoine took place just outside the Bastille. Condé had sallied out of Paris to prevent the advance of the royalist forces under the command of Henri de Turenne. Condé's forces became trapped against the city walls and the Porte St Antoine, which the Parliament refused to open; he was coming under increasingly heavy fire from the Royalist artillery and the situation looked bleak. King Louis XIV and Cardinal Mazarin watched the engagement from the heights of Charonne outside the city walls. In a famous incident, La Grande Mademoiselle, the daughter of Gaston, the Duke of Orléans, convinced her father to issue an order for the Parisian forces to act, before she then entered the Bastille and personally ensured that the commander turned the fortress's cannon on Turenne's army, causing significant casualties and enabling Condé's army's safe withdrawal. Mazarin reportedly remarked of her action: "With that cannon, Mademoiselle has shot her husband", meaning that any prospect of her marriage to Louis XIV was now destroyed. As a consequence of her intervention, when Louis XIV returned to Paris in October 1652, La Grande Mademoiselle was sent into exile at her estate at Saint-Fargeau, where she remained until 1657.

Later in 1652, Condé was finally forced to surrender Paris to the royalist forces in October, effectively bringing the Parisian Fronde to an end: the Bastille returned to royal control. The Fronde in the Provinces, especially around Bordeaux, however, continued through the summer of 1653, also with involvement of the Spanish fleet in the Battle of Bordeaux (1653).

== Bibliography ==
- Hazan, Eric. (2011) The Invention of Paris: A History in Footsteps. London: Verso. ISBN 978-1-84467-705-4.
- Le Bas, M. (1840) France. Annales historiques. Paris: F. Didot fréres. OCLC 656850085. (in French)
- Munck, Thomas. (1990) Seventeenth Century Europe: 1598-1700. London: Macmillan. ISBN 978-0-333-28641-8.
- Grant, RG, ed. (2011). 1001 Battles That Changed the Course of History. Universe Publishing. ISBN 978-0789322333.
- Sainte-Aulaire, Louis Clair de Beaupoil Le Comte de. (1827) Histoire de la Fronde, Tome 3. Paris: Baudouin Frères. OCLC 562330561. (in French)
- Treasure, Geoffrey. (1997) Mazarin: the Crisis of Absolutism in France. London: Routledge. ISBN 978-0-415-16211-1.
