= Turning movement =

Military tactic

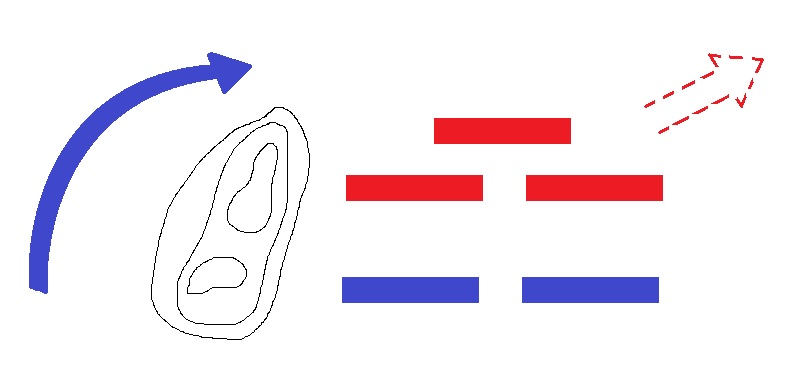
Classic military turning movement. Part of blue force has separated and using terrain to screen their movement, is attempting to "turn" the red force. The red force has to move out of their position to avoid being attacked from two directions.

In military tactics, a turning movement is a form of maneuver in which the attacking force seeks to avoid the enemy's principal defensive positions by seizing objectives behind the enemy's current positions, thereby causing the enemy force to move out of their current positions or divert major forces to meet the threat. One early example is the Battle of Lake Trasimene during the Second Punic War.

== Examples ==
- Battle of Lake Trasimene (217 BC)
- Turenne's Winter Campaign (1675)
- Battle of Ulm (1805)
- Peninsula Campaign (1862)
- Sherman's March to the Sea (1864)
