= Battle of Mulhouse (1674) =

Battle in the Franco-Dutch War

Coordinates: 47.7495°N 7.3399°E

- Part of Franco-Dutch War
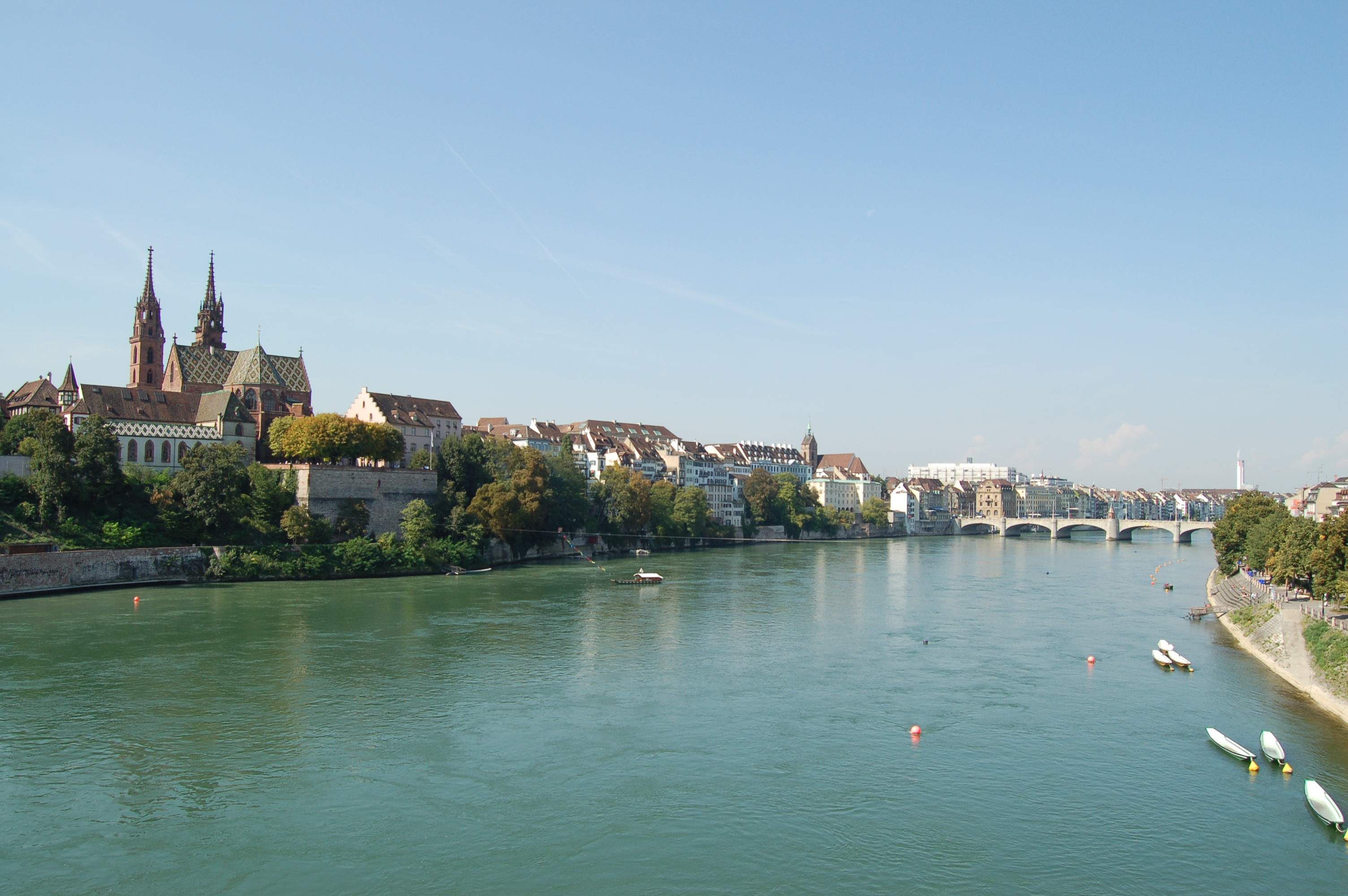
- The Rhine, south of Mulhouse
Date	29 December 1674
Location	Mulhouse, Alsace, France
Result	French victory

Belligerents
France	Holy Roman Empire

Commanders and leaders
(Kingdom of France) Turenne (Kingdom of France) Montauban (POW)	(Holy Roman Empire) Hermann of Baden-Baden (Holy Roman Empire) Bournonville

Strength
3,000	5,000

Casualties and losses
60	300 killed or wounded 900–1,000 captured

The Battle of Mulhouse took place on 29 December 1674 in Alsace, part of Turenne's Winter Campaign during the Franco-Dutch War. It was fought by the French army under Turenne and part of Alexander von Bournonville's Imperial army commanded by Hermann of Baden-Baden.

Following the inconclusive Battle of Entzheim on 4 October, the Imperial army took up winter quarters around Colmar. Rather than doing the same, Turenne split up his army and traveled through the Vosges Mountains before reforming it near Belfort. Taken by surprise, Bournonville sent Hermann to hold Mulhouse, where he was attacked and defeated by Turenne on 29 December. Another French victory at the Battle of Turckheim on 5 January 1675 forced the Imperials to withdraw from Alsace.

== Background ==
In the 1667–1668 War of Devolution, France captured most of the Spanish Netherlands before the Triple Alliance of the Dutch Republic, England and Sweden forced them to relinquish most of these gains at the Treaty of Aix-la-Chapelle. Louis XIV now decided achieving his objectives in the Netherlands was best done by attacking the Dutch directly. When France invaded the Dutch Republic in May 1672, at first it seemed they had won an overwhelming victory. However, by July the Dutch position had stabilised, while concern at French gains brought them support from Frederick William of Brandenburg-Prussia, Emperor Leopold and Charles II of Spain.

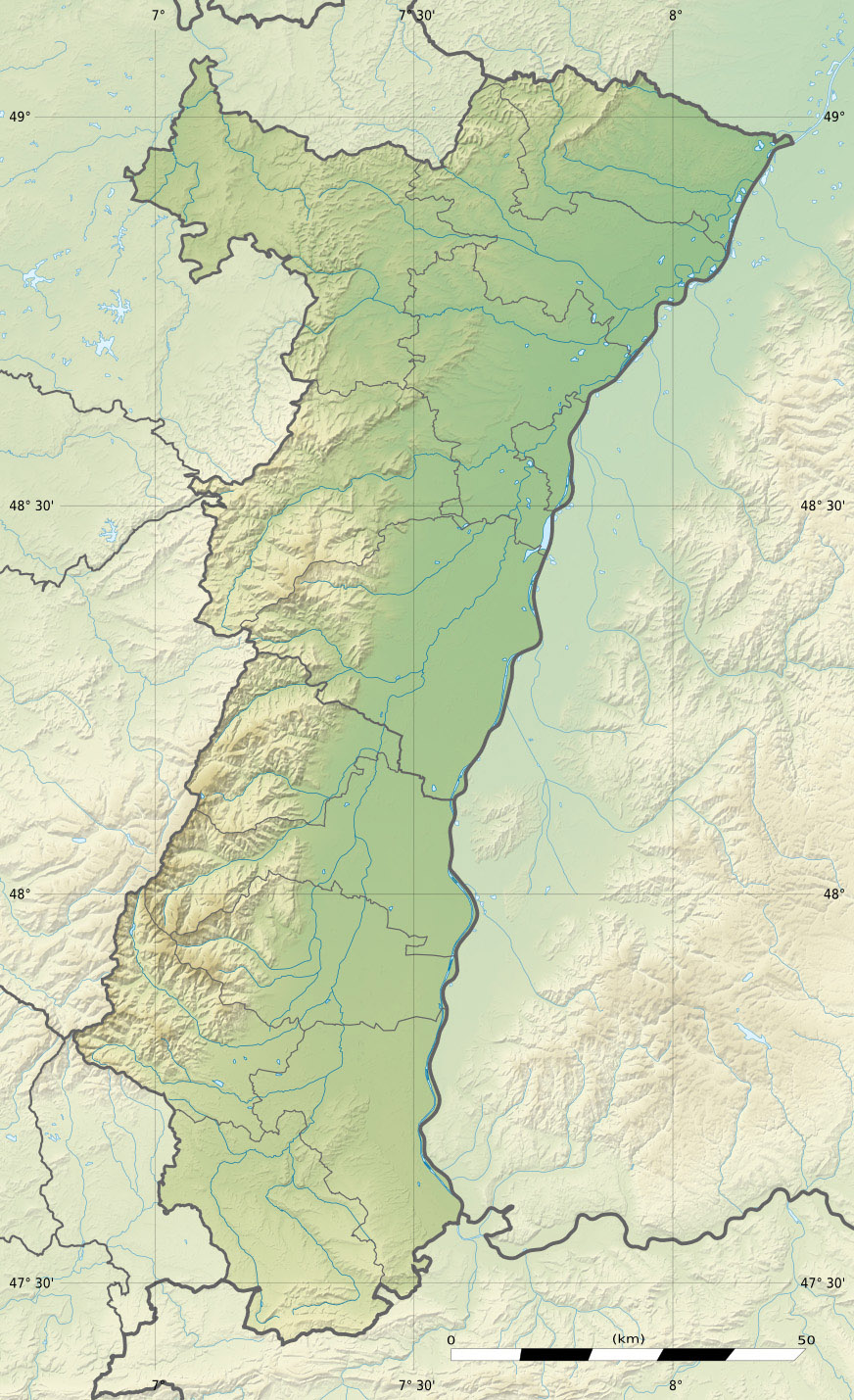
The campaign in Alsace; the modern French-German border runs along the Rhine (right)

In August 1672, an Imperial army entered the Rhineland, forcing Louis into a war of attrition around the French frontiers. The French army in Germany was led by Turenne, often considered the greatest general of the period. Over the next two years, he won a series of victories over superior Imperial forces led by Alexander von Bournonville and Raimondo Montecuccoli, the one commander contemporaries considered his equal.

After 1673, it became a largely defensive campaign, focused on protecting French gains in the Rhineland and preventing Imperial forces linking up with the Dutch. France was over-extended, a problem that increased when Denmark–Norway joined the Alliance in January, 1674, while England and the Dutch Republic made peace in the February Treaty of Westminster.

Although the main campaign of 1674 was fought in Flanders, an Imperial army opened a second front in Alsace when Bournonville crossed the Rhine at Strasbourg, with over 40,000 men. This was a diplomatic coup for Emperor Leopold, since despite being a Free Imperial city, Strasbourg had previously been neutral and its bridge was a major crossing point. Bournonville now halted, waiting for another 20,000 men provided by Frederick William; once combined, they would overwhelm the smaller French army and invade eastern France.

The campaign that began in June 1674 and ended with his death in July 1675 has been described as 'Turenne's most brilliant.' Despite being out-numbered, he attacked Bournonville on 4 October before he could be reinforced; although the Battle of Entzheim was indecisive, the Imperials withdrew, entering winter quarters around Colmar, where they were joined by Frederick William's troops. Although it was normal practice to avoid campaigning during the winter, Turenne went on the offensive. He marched south, using the Vosges mountains to screen his movements from the Imperial commanders and reached Belfort on 27 December (see Map).

== Battle ==
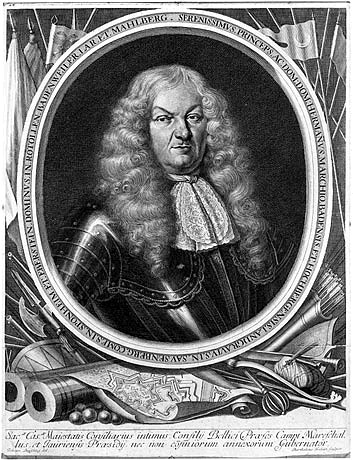
Hermann, Prince of Baden-Baden, 1628–1691; Imperial commander at Mulhouse

Although the arrival of French troops at Belfort took Bournonville by surprise, Turenne was forced to delay his attack on Alsace in order to gather supplies. Learning from prisoners the Imperial forces were concentrated at Colmar and Altkirch, Turenne decided to split them by advancing through Mulhouse, then a free city associated with Switzerland. To do this, he set off with an advance guard of 3,000 cavalry, leaving his infantry to follow as soon as possible.

Bournonville hoped to hold a line along the Ill River until his army could assemble and the delay in the French advance allowed Hermann of Baden-Baden and around 5,000 Imperial cavalry men to occupy Mulhouse. Moving north from Altkirch toward Colmar, Turenne reached the Ill near Mulhouse on 29 December, where he found seven Imperial squadrons deployed along the river bank. As the river was fordable at this point, Turenne ordered Montauban to attack and the battle quickly escalated as both commanders fed in reinforcements.

As this contest was going on, Turenne deployed a large force on his right, which advanced with as much fanfare as possible, giving the impression the whole French army was arriving. The Imperial cuirassiers fell back into Mulhouse and the entire force withdrew in disorder, some escaping toward Basel to take refuge in Switzerland. Turenne lost 60 men, including Montauban who had been captured; sources disagree on Imperial casualties, one suggesting they exceeded 1,300 including prisoners. This seems inflated for what was a relatively minor engagement, and the lower figure of 300 seems more likely.

== Aftermath ==
Turenne returned to his main force at Belfort, which was finally ready to resume its advance on Colmar in early January; on 5 January, he defeated Bournonville at the Battle of Turckheim, forcing the Imperial army out of Alsace.

== Sources ==
- Brooks, Richard (2000). Atlas of World Military History. Barnes and Noble Books. ISBN 978-0760720257.
- Chandler, David (1984). Marlborough as Military Commander (1989 ed.). Spellmount. ISBN 978-0946771127.
- Clodfelter, Micheal (1992). Warfare and Armed Conflicts: A Statistical Reference to Casualty and Other Figures, 1500–2000 (2008 ed.). McFarland & Co. ISBN 978-0786474707.
- Davenport, Frances (1917). European treaties bearing on the history of the United States and its dependencies: Volume I. Carnegie Institution.
- De Périni, Hardÿ (1896). Batailles françaises, 1660–1700 V5. Ernest Flammarion, Paris.
- Dodge, Theodore Ayrault (1890). Gustavus Adolphus: A History of the Art of War from its Revival After the Middle Ages to the End of the Spanish Succession War, with a Detailed Account of the Campaigns of the Great Swede, and of the Most Famous Campaigns of Turenne, Conde, Eugene, and Marlborough. Vol. II. Houghton, Mifflin and Company.
- Guthrie, William (2003). The Later Thirty Years War: From the Battle of Wittstock to the Treaty of Westphalia (Contributions in Military Studies). Praeger. ISBN 978-0313324086.
- Lynn, John (1996). The Wars of Louis XIV, 1667-1714 (Modern Wars In Perspective). Longman. ISBN 978-0582056299.
- A Relation or Journal of the Campaigns of the Marechal de Turenne, in the Years One Thousand Six Hundred Seventy Four, and One Thousand Six Hundred Seventy Five; 'Til the Time of His Death. Done from the French, By an Officer of the Army. Dublin: Addison's Head, 1732.
- Smith, Rhea (1965). Spain; A Modern History. University of Michigan Press. ISBN 978-0472071500.
- Tucker, Spencer C. (2009). A Global Chronology of Conflict: From the Ancient World to the Modern Middle East [6 volumes]. ABC-CLIO. ISBN 978-1-85109-672-5.
- Bodart, G. (1916). Losses of Life in Modern Wars, Austria-Hungary; France. Creative Media Partners, LLC. ISBN 978-1371465520.
