= Charles de Monchy d'Hocquincourt =

French military officer and Marshal of France

Charles de Monchy Marquess of Hocquincourt
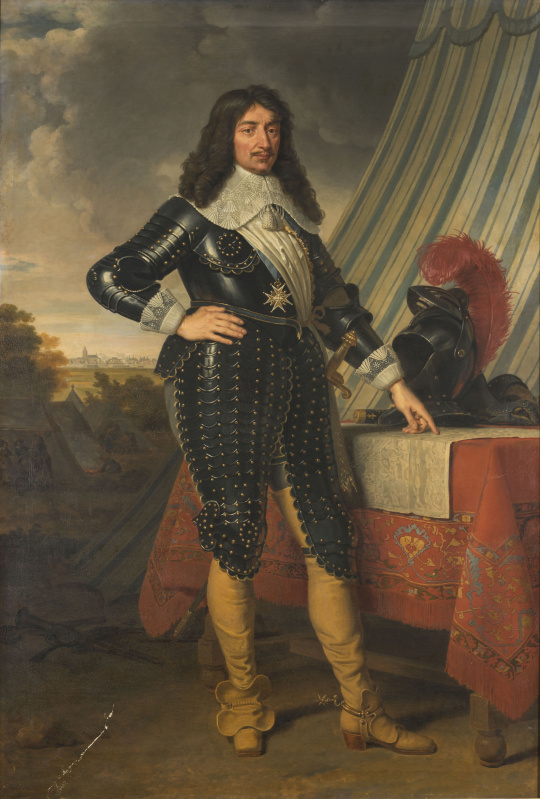
- Born: 1599
- Died: 13 June 1658 (aged 58–59); Siege of Dunkirk
- Spouse: Eléonore d'Estampes (m. 1628; died 1658)
- Military career
- Allegiance: France
- Rank: Marshal of France

Charles de Monchy, Marquess of Hocquincourt (1599 – 13 June 1658), was a French nobleman and officer of the reigns of Kings Louis XIII and Louis XIV. He was made Marshal of France in 1651.

== Early life ==
Monchy was born in 1599 into the House of Monchy, an ancient family of the nobility of Picardy, the oldest of which dates back to the 11th century. He was the son of Georges de Monchy, Lord of Hocquincourt, who had married his cousin, Claude de Monchy, Lady of Inquessen. His younger sister, Catherine de Monchy d'Hocquincourt, married Marshal Jacques Rouxel de Grancey.

== Career ==
He distinguished himself in the various campaigns against the Spanish during the Franco-Spanish War, under King Louis XIII, at La Marfée, at Ville-Franche and at Lérida in 1642.

He was made Maréchal de camp in 1639, commanding the left wing of the royal army at the Battle of Rethel (or Blanc-Champ) where Viscount Turenne, then a rebel, was defeated in 1650, and received the baton of Marshal of France on 5 January 1651.

In 1652, he was defeated at Bléneau, a battle of the Second Fronde, by Louis de Condé, who was then in the ranks of the Spanish. He was sent to Catalonia in 1653, he besieged Girona without success and then took part in the Battle of Bordils. He took part in the relief of Arras in August 1654, but failed to prevent Condé's escape.

In order to please Madame de Montbazon and Madame de Châtillon, who were part of the Fronde, he was seen abandoning the Court and joining the Spanish in 1655. They entrusted him with the defense of Dunkirk, where he was killed in 1658.

== Personal life ==
On 7 November 1628, Monchy married Eléonore d'Estampes (1607–1679), the youngest daughter of Jacques d'Estampes, Lord of Valençay, and Louise Blondel. Together, they were the parents of eight children, including:

- Georges de Monchy (d. 1688), the Marquess of Hocquincourt; he became Governor of Péronne, Lieutenant-General of the King's Armies in 1655, Mestre de camp of the Brittany regiment, he opposed his father who wanted to deliver the town of Péronne to the Spanish.
- Armand de Monchy (d. 1679), who became the Bishop of Verdun.
- Jacques de Monchy (d. 1652)
- Dominique de Monchy (d. 1665), who drowned with his ship after a naval battle against the Ottoman galleys in November 1665, in the company of Tourville.
- Honoré de Monchy d'Hocquincourt.
- Gabriel de Monchy (1643–1675), known as the Count of Hocquincourt; Commander of the Queen's Dragoons, he was killed at Gramshusen during an attack on the church.
- Claude de Monchy.
- Marguerite de Monchy.

The Marquess died on 13 June 1658 during the Siege of Dunkirk.
