= Henri de La Tour d'Auvergne, Viscount of Turenne =

French nobleman, general, Marshal of France (1611–1675)

Marshal General Henri de La Tour d'Auvergne vicomte de Turenne
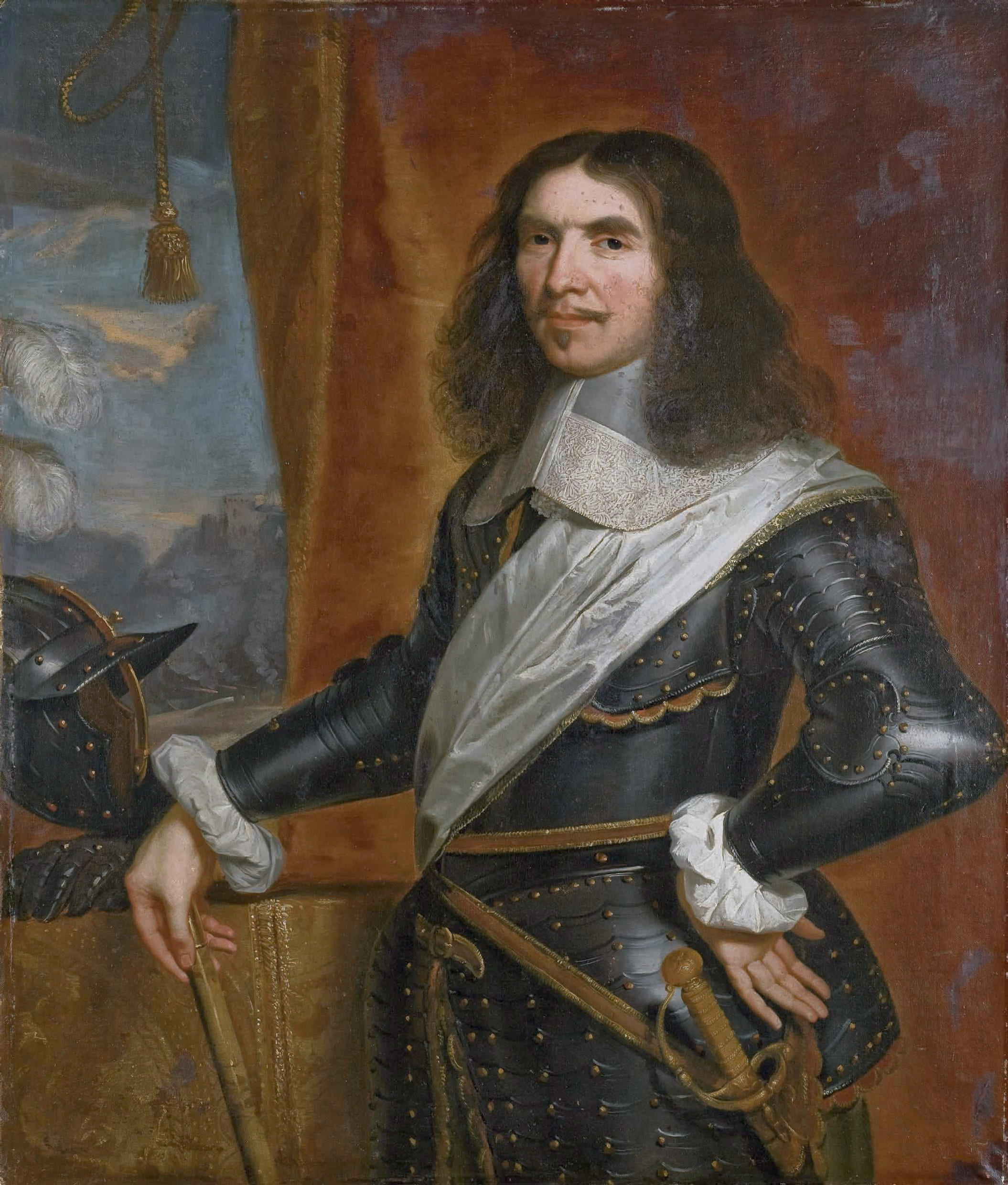
- Portrait by Philippe de Champaigne
- Born: 11 September 1611; Castle of Sedan, Principality of Sedan (present-day France)
- Died: 27 July 1675 (aged 63); Sasbach, Duchy of Württemberg (present-day Germany)
- Relatives: House of La Tour d'Auvergne
- Military career
- Allegiance: Dutch Republic (1625–1633); Kingdom of France (1630–1675)
- Branch: Dutch States Army; French Army; • French Royal Army
- Service years: 1625–1675
- Rank: Maréchal général des camps et armées du roi
- Nickname: Turenne
- Conflicts: See battles: Eighty Years' War; Siege of Klundert; Siege of Wilhelmstadt; Siege of Groll; Siege of 's-Hertogenbosch; Thirty Years' War; Siege of La Mothe; Siege of Heidelberg; Siege of Spire; Battle of Meizenheim; Siege of Zabern; Battle of Jussey; Siege of Jonville; Siege of Landreçies; Siege of Breisach; Battle of the Route de Quiers; Battle of Casale; Siege of Turin; Siege of Coni; Siege of Ceva; Siege of Mondovì; Siege of Trino; Condé's Bavarian Campaign; Battle of Freiburg; Siege of Philippsburg; Siege of Landau; Battle of Herbsthausen; Battle of Nördlingen; Siege of Rain; Siege of Augsburg; Siege of Worms; Battle of Zusmarshausen; Fronde; Battle of Rethel; Battle of Bléneau; Battle of the Faubourg Étampes; Siege of Étampes; Battle of the Faubourg St Antoine; Franco-Spanish War; Siege of Rethel; Siege of Mouzon; Siege of Saint Menehould; Siege of Stenay; Siege of Arras; Battle of Arras; Siege of Landrecies; Siege of La Capelle; Battle of Valenciennes; Siege of La Chapelle; Siege of Saint Ghislain; Siege of Cambrai; Battle of the Dunes; Siege of Dunkirk; Siege of Bergues; War of Devolution; Siege of Tournai; Siege of Lille; Franco-Dutch War; Siege of Nijmegen; Battle of Sinsheim; Turenne's Winter Campaign; Battle of Entzheim; Battle of Mulhouse; Battle of Turckheim; Battle of Salzbach †

Henri de La Tour d'Auvergne, vicomte de Turenne (11 September 1611 – 27 July 1675), commonly known as Turenne (French: [tyʁɛn]), was a French general and one of only six marshals to have been promoted Marshal General of France. The most illustrious member of the La Tour d'Auvergne family, his military exploits over his five-decade career earned him a reputation as one of the greatest military commanders in history.

Born to a Huguenot family, the son of a Marshal of France, he was introduced to the art of war at a young age. He first served as a volunteer in the Dutch States Army under the orders of his maternal uncles Maurice of Nassau and Frederick Henry before pursuing his career in the service of France, where his noble origins and proven qualities soon saw him rise to the top of the military hierarchy. He rose to prominence during the Thirty Years' War by capturing the fortress of Breisach in 1638. Promoted Marshal of France in 1643, he struck against Bavaria the following year, defeating the Bavarian army in three years of campaigning and forcing the Elector of Bavaria to make peace. The Elector soon broke the treaty and in 1648 Turenne invaded again with Swedish support, subduing the Imperial army at Zusmarshausen and pacifying Bavaria.

Turenne initially supported the Fronde but returned to royal service in 1651, emerging as France's foremost general by defeating the rebellious army of the Prince of Condé on the outskirts of Paris and re-occupying the city. His triumphs against Spanish armies at Arras (1654) and at Dunkirk (1658) led to the overrunning of much of the Spanish Netherlands and brought the war against Spain to a victorious conclusion. Two years later, Louis XIV appointed him Marshal General of France. Although a supporter of absolute monarchy, he only converted to Catholicism in 1668, refusing to do so earlier despite political incentives.

During the War of Devolution in 1667, Turenne captured the Spanish Netherlands practically without resistance. In 1672 the French invaded the Dutch Republic and the Marshal General conquered the country up to Amsterdam. Checked by the Dutch flooding of the land, he invaded the Holy Roman Empire the next year, reaching the Elbe and compelling Brandenburg to abandon the anti-French coalition. Faced with the loss of Alsace to superior Allied forces, he crowned his career with a series of battlefield victories, most notably at Turckheim (1675) and a masterful strategic turning movement around the Vosges in mid-winter that drove the Imperials from Alsace. He was killed by an Imperial cannonball at the battle of Salzbach in 1675.

== Background and early career ==
Turenne's coat of arms as a Marshal of France
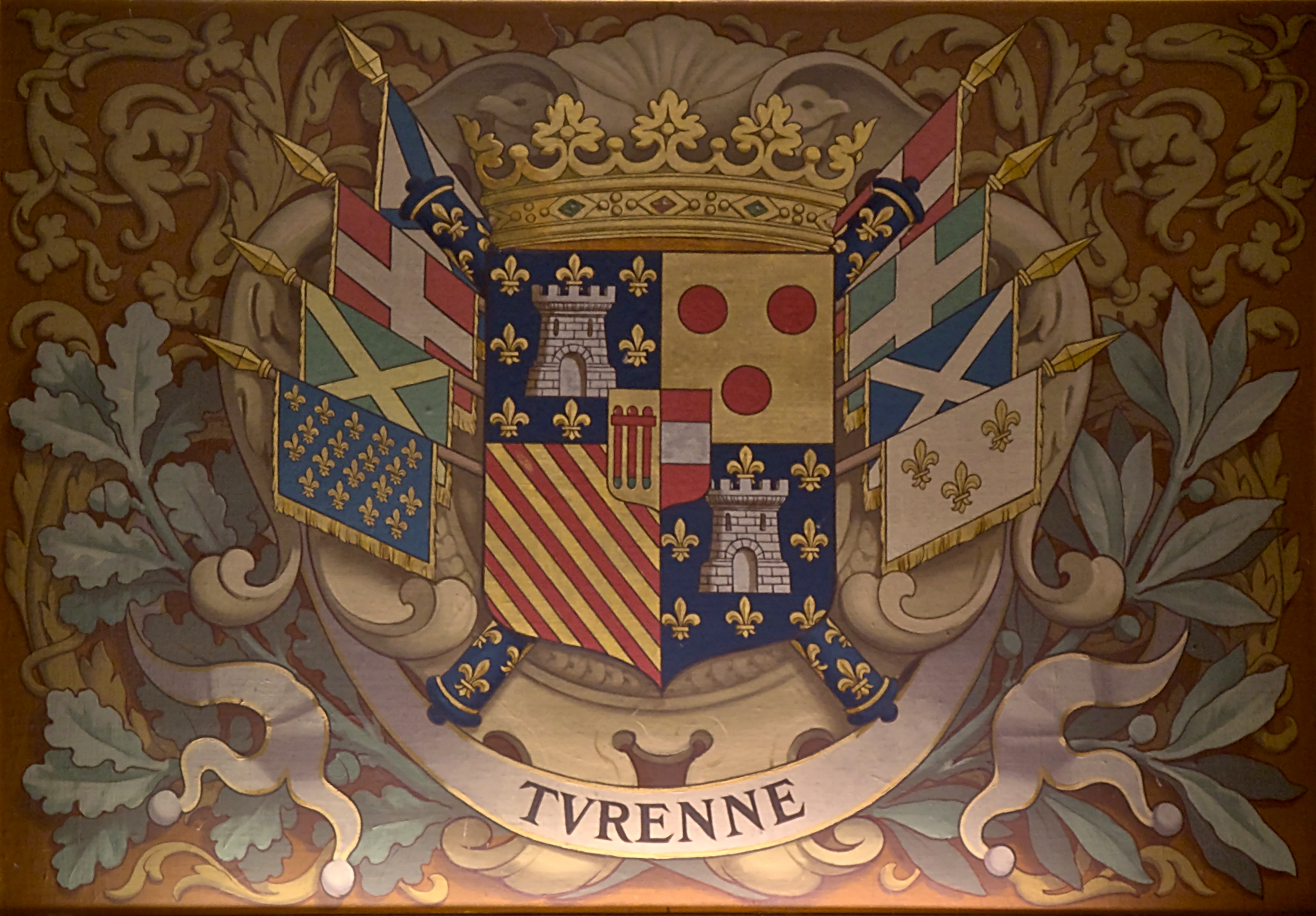
- in the Château de Chantilly

Versions
- SVG depiction of the same
- Shield: Français : Blason : écartelé, en 1 et 4 d'azur semé de fleurs de lys d'or et à la tour d'argent maçonnée et ouverte de sable (qui est de La Tour), en 2 d'or au trois tourteaux de gueules (qui est Boulogne), et 3 coticé d'or et de gueules de 8 pièces (qui est Turenne), sur le tout parti d'or au gonfanon de gueules frangé de sinople (qui est Auvergne) et de gueules à la fasce d'argent (qui est Bouillon)

The second son of Henri de La Tour d'Auvergne, Duke of Bouillon, sovereign Prince of Sedan, by his second wife Elizabeth, daughter of William the Silent, Prince of Orange, he was born at Sedan. It is said that much of his money found its way to the poor during his early life. He received a Huguenot education and the usual training of a young noble of the time, but physical infirmity hampered his progress, though he showed a marked skill at history and geography, and was greatly impressed by the exploits of Alexander the Great and Caesar. At first he was a lazy student but after his father started saying his intellectual laziness was as great a barrier to joining the army as his physical weakness, he began to study on his own accord. After his father's death in 1623, he devoted himself to bodily exercises and in a great measure overcame his natural weakness. Turenne and his mother were devout Calvinists and were suspicious of Cardinal Richelieu, so when Turenne began his military career at the age of fourteen, he did so in the camp of his uncle, Maurice of Nassau, the Stadtholder of Holland and Prince of Orange. He started as a private in Maurice's bodyguard during the Eighty Years' War.

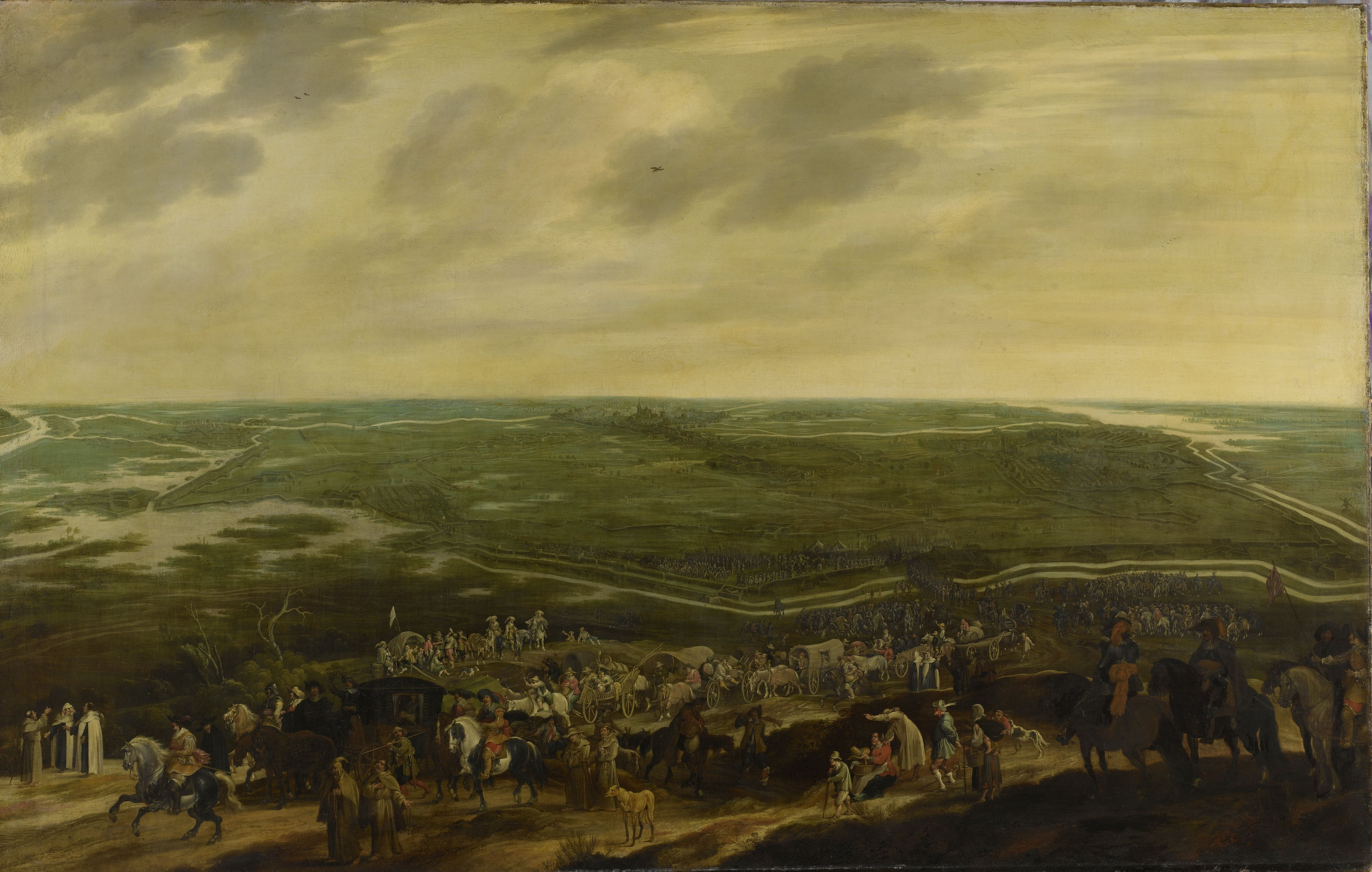
Spanish troops in retreat after the siege of Den Bosch in 1629. Turenne distinguished himself during the siege.

Frederick Henry of Nassau, who succeeded his brother Maurice as Stadtholder and Prince of Orange in 1625, granted Turenne a captaincy in 1626. Turenne personally drilled his troops, as was the custom at the time, and won their respect with his charity and simple lifestyle. His company was alleged to be the best drilled and most disciplined one in the army, he required of his soldiers not only discipline but also high moral standards. His kindness made him well-liked among the entire army. The young officer took his part in the sieges of the period, learning much about fortifications and siege warfare. In 1629, Turenne served in the siege of Bois-le-Duc as commander of an artillery and reconnaissance. He won special commendation for his skill at this battle, but was reprimanded for recklessness. He also learned much about the details of leading an army, like posting guards and reconnaissance. In 1630 Turenne left the Netherlands and entered the service of France, motivated both by the prospect of military advancement but also because of his mother's desire to display loyalty to the French crown.

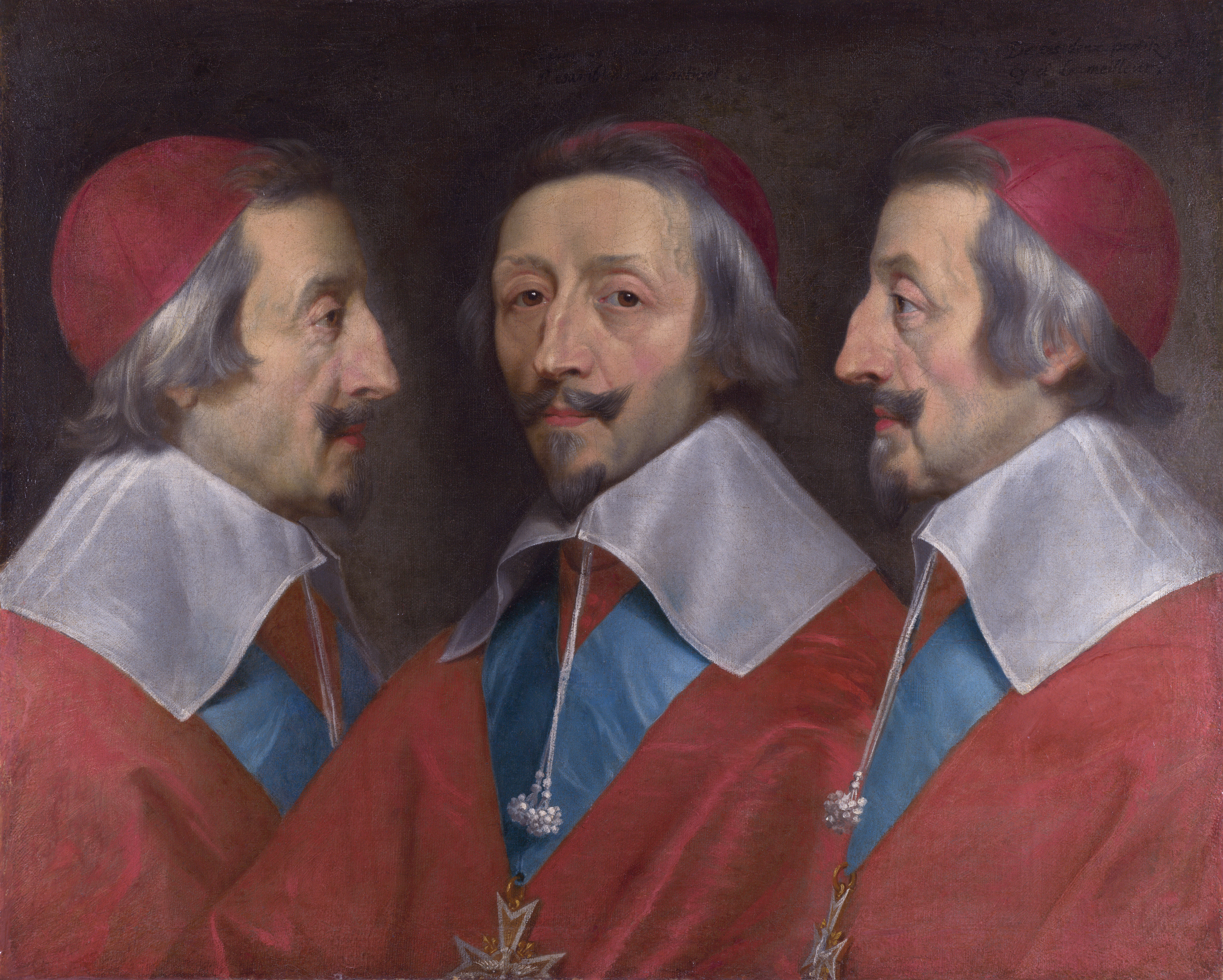
Cardinal Richelieu

Cardinal Richelieu immediately made him colonel of an infantry regiment. Yet he continued to serve with the Prince of Orange at short intervals, who at the time had an alliance with France. He took part in successful fighting near Antwerp and fought against Hendrik van den Bergh. He took part in an uneventful campaign under Schomberg in 1630 but his first serious service under the French flag occurred at the siege of La Mothe in Lorraine by Marshal de la Force (1634), where his brilliant courage at the assault won him immediate promotion to the rank of maréchal de camp (equivalent to the modern grade of major-general). In 1635 Turenne served under Louis de Nogaret de La Valette in Lorraine and on the Rhine. The French and their allies raised the Imperial siege of Mainz (8 August 1635), but the French army had to fall back on Metz for want of provisions. In the retreat he measured swords with the famous Imperial General Gallas, and distinguished himself greatly. He managed to defeat his pursuers in battle but the Imperials were too numerous to be turned around. The reorganised army took the field again in 1636 and captured Saverne (Zabern), at the storming of which he was seriously wounded. In 1637 he took part in the campaign of Flanders, including the capture of Landrecies (26 July). In the latter part of 1638, serving under Bernhard of Saxe-Weimar (1608–1639), he directed the assault on Breisach (reputedly the strongest fortress on the upper Rhine), which surrendered on 17 December. In led the assault on the powerful fortress of Vieux-Brisach in 1638 and obtained its capitulation on December 17.

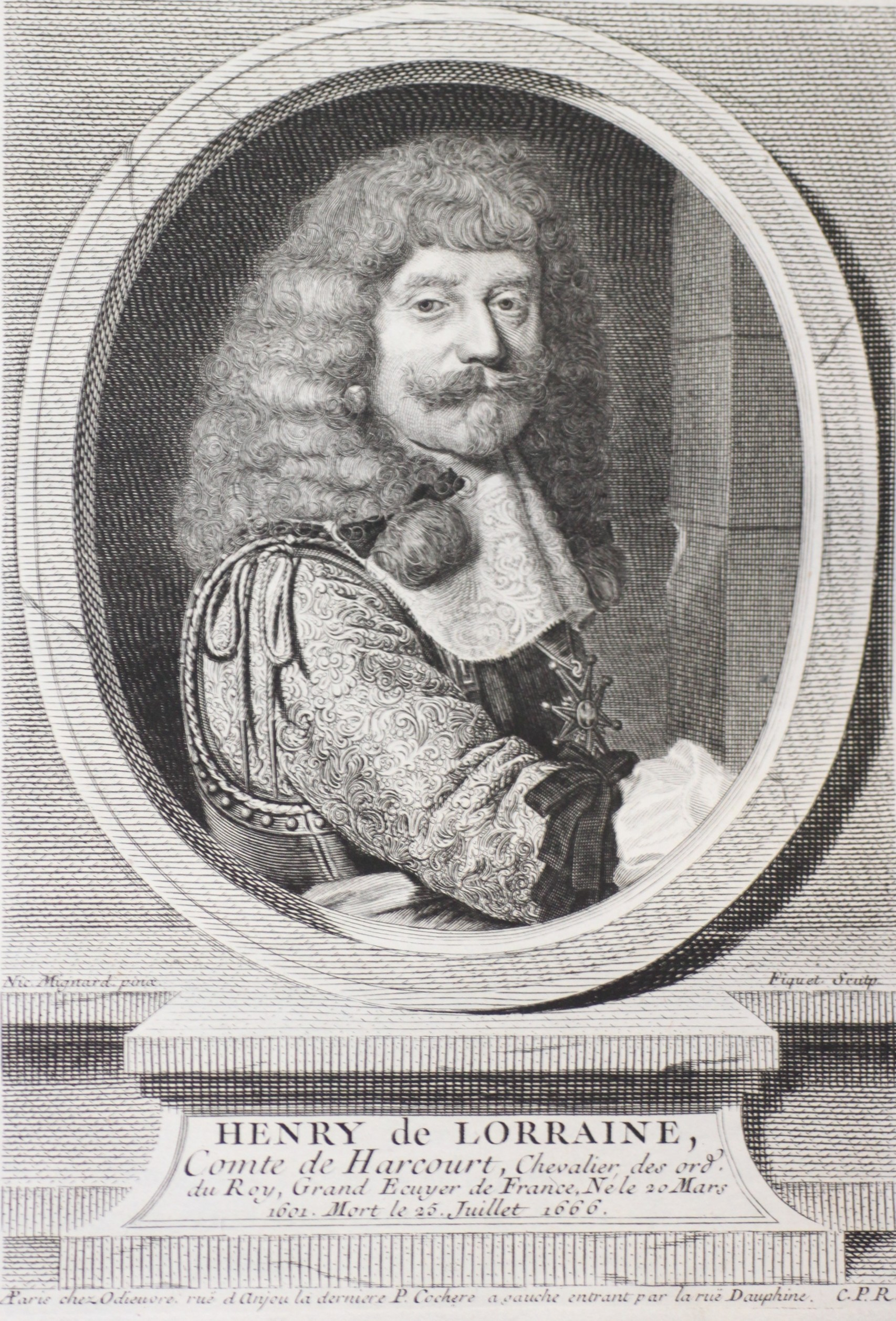
Henri, Count of Harcourt Turenne's superior at Turin

Turenne had now gained a reputation as one of the foremost of the younger generals of France, and Richelieu next employed him in the Italian campaign of 1639–1640 under Henri de Lorraine, count of Harcourt. On 19 November 1639, Turenne fought in the famous rearguard action called the battle of the "Route de Quiers", for which he received a lot of credit, though he only gave himself a small role in his own description of events. At the battle of Casal, 10,000 Frenchmen defeated 20,000 Spaniards. The French commander Harcourt was almost encircled, but Turenne used deception to scare off the enemy and the battle was won. In 1640, Harcourt saved Casale Monferrato and besieged Prince Thomas' forces in Turin, which in turn were besieging another French force in the citadel thereof. That winter he relieved the citadel of Turin, held by the French against the forces of Prince Thomas of Savoy. The French in the citadel held out, while Prince Thomas had to surrender on 17 September 1640, a fourth army which had invested Harcourt's lines being at the same time forced to retire. Turenne, by now lieutenant-general, played a major role in the victory. He himself commanded during the campaign of 1641 and took Coni, Ceva and Mondovì.

In 1642 he served as second-in-command of the French troops which conquered Roussillon. At this time Richelieu discovered the conspiracy of Cinq Mars in which Turenne's elder brother, the Duke of Bouillon, had become implicated.

== Marshal of France ==
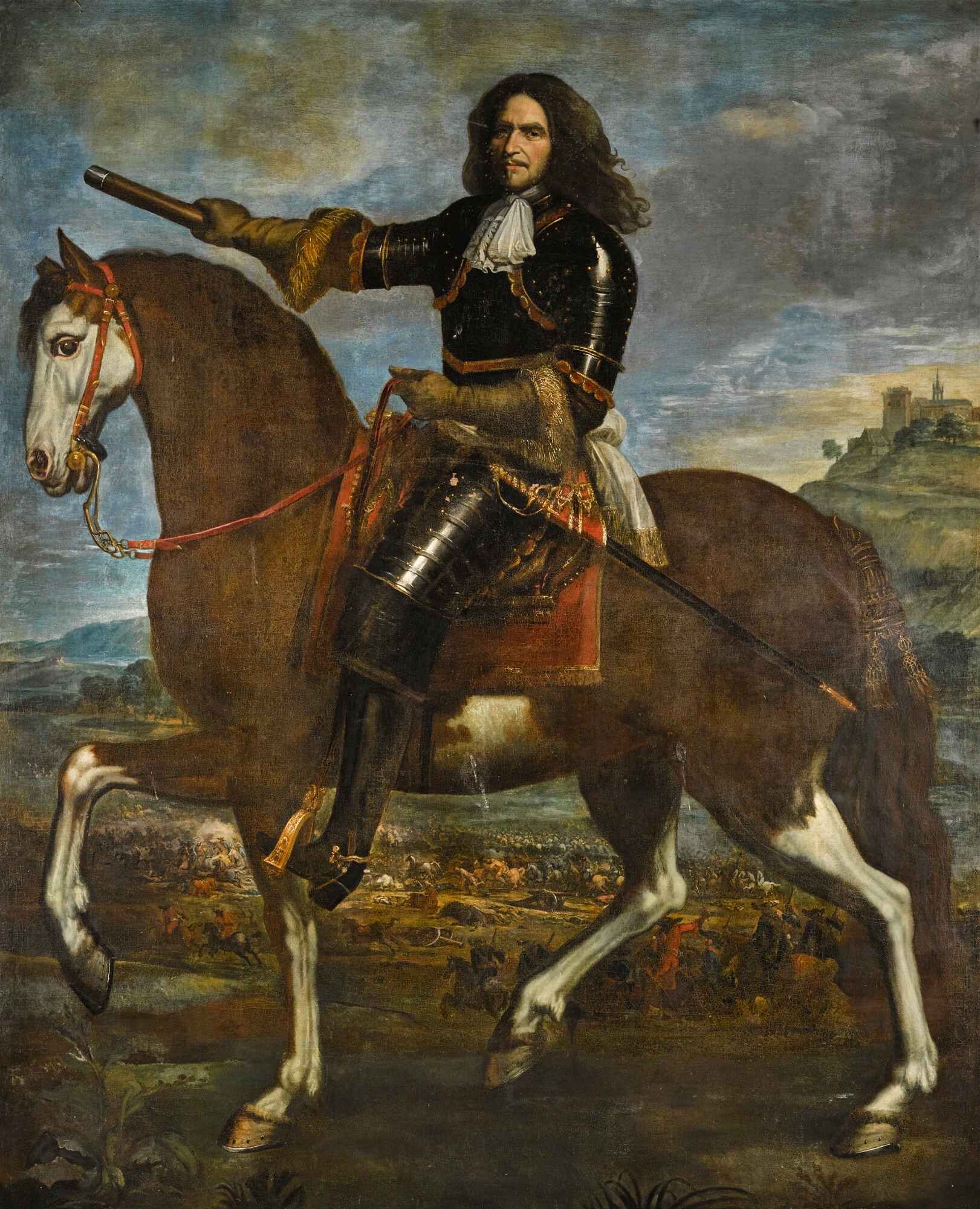
Turenne as Marshal of France.

The relations of the principality of Sedan to the French crown markedly influenced the earlier career of Turenne; sometimes it proved necessary to advance the soldier to conciliate the ducal family, at other times the machinations of the ducal family against Richelieu or Mazarin prevented the king's advisers from giving their full confidence to their general in the field. Moreover, his steady adherence to the Protestant religion provided a further element of difficulty in Turenne's relations with the ministers. Cardinal Richelieu nevertheless entrusted him with the command in Italy in 1643 under Prince Thomas, who had changed sides in the quarrel, and who was not trusted by Richelieu. Thomas, nominally in command, quickly put Turenne in control of the campaign. Using deception to fool the Spanish into weakening Trino, Turenne took the town in a few weeks. He was promoted to Marshal of France on 16 May 1643.

Turenne was recalled due to the intrigues of Cardinal Mazarin, who was sabotaging Turenne's career. This meant that he was available in case of sudden need for a good commander. After the French suffered a devastating defeat at Tuttlingen, Turenne was thrown back into action. The following campaign would greatly advance his career.

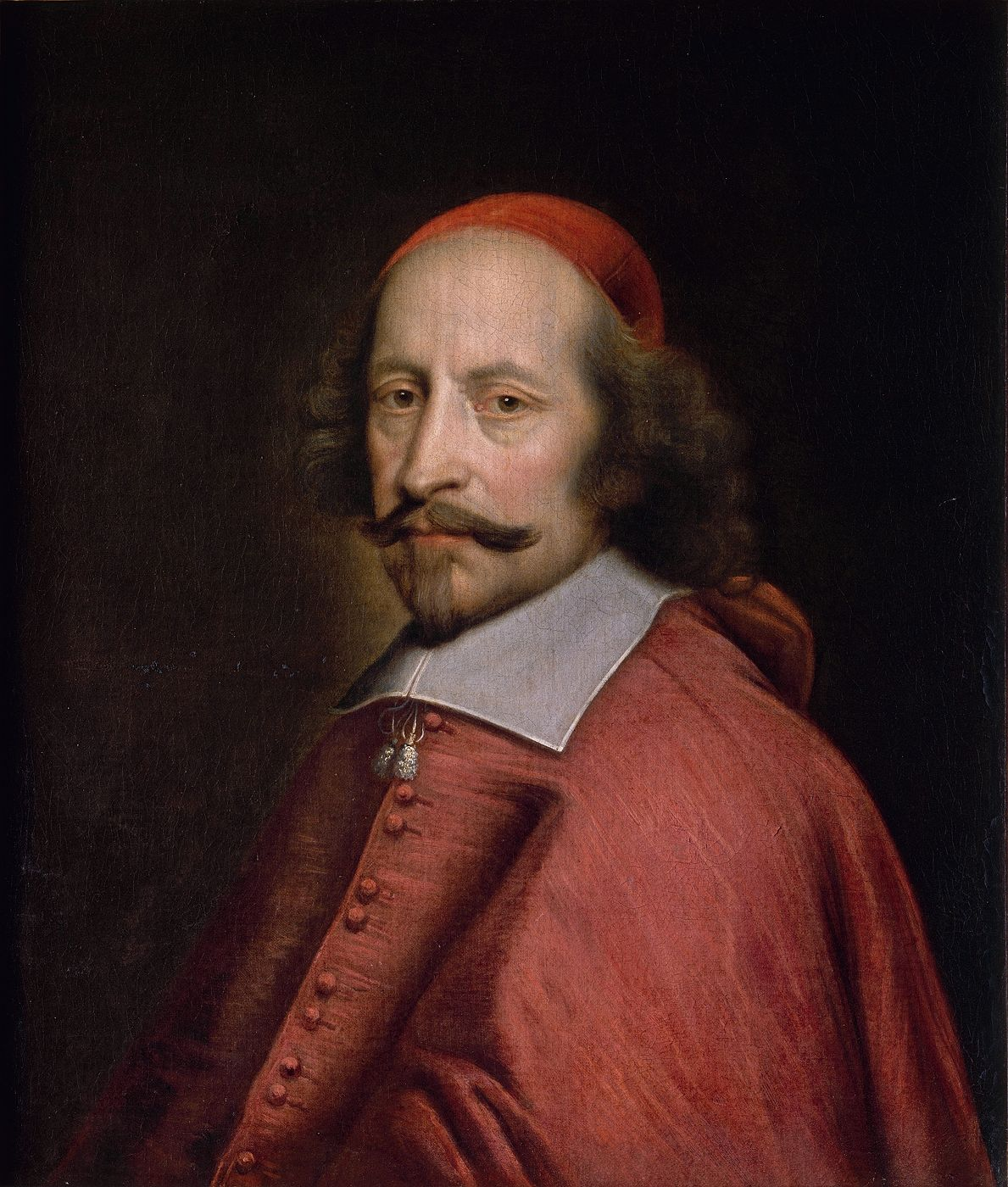
Cardinal Mazarin

While moulding the army back into fighting condition, Turenne bought mounts for 5,000 cavalrymen and clothes for 4,000 infantrymen with his own money. The reorganization finished; Turenne began campaigning in June 1644, crossing the Rhine at Breisach. He defeated Gaspard von Mercy in the Black Forest before retreating to the Rhine. Unable to relieve the besieged Freiburg with inferior numbers, he was quickly joined by a force under the Duke of Enghien, later to be known as the Grand Condé. The Duke, as a prince of the royal house, took the chief command of the united armies of "France" and "Weimar". The desperately fought battle of Freiburg against Franz von Mercy's Bavarians (3, 5 and 9 August 1644) proved the chief event of the first campaign. In this battle, Turenne distinguished himself with a well-executed strike at the enemy flank. The French continued on by successfully besieging Philippsburg. Before the capitulation Enghien withdrew and left Turenne in command. At the same time the Duke of Lorraine moved to besiege nearby Bacharach. Turenne took 500 men and built a huge camp near Bacharach, believing Turenne had a large force; Lorraine retreated. Turenne continued on by taking the important fortress of Kreuznach and blocking the route between the two armies.

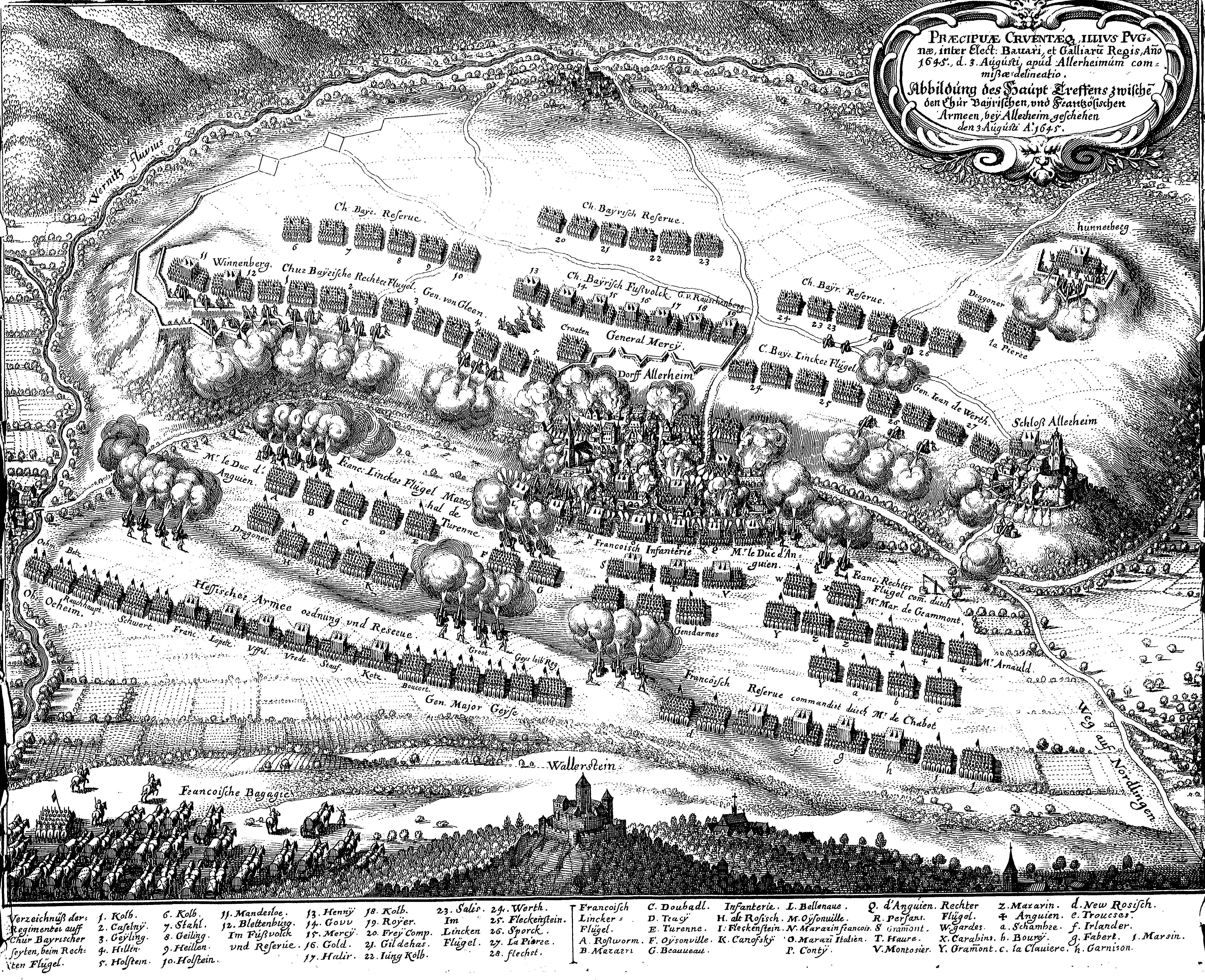
Battle of Nördlingen

Turenne began the 1645 campaign with a successful forward movement, but Mercy managed to deceive him into thinking the Bavarians were scattered and far away and he was taken by surprise and defeated at Mergentheim. While Turenne had quickly ordered his forces to unite one of his subordinates, general Rosen, was not informed on the situation, defied the order, leading to defeat while Turenne's main force was winning. Turenne's army lost all of its artillery and baggage and five-sixths of its infantry. Turenne retreated to Hesse, which caused its forces to join the French as well as a Swedish force and reinforcements under Condé, who took command once again. The Swedes soon departed, but Enghien commanded still 17,000 men. The French marched into Bavaria with facing little opposition until they caught up with Mercy's retreating army. Mercy inflicted casualties on the French in an artillery duel and outmanoeuvred them in the march on Allerheim, buying time to fortify his position. Turenne advised not to fight but this was rejected by Condé. Turenne's plan of attack was accepted by Condé. The following battle was a French victory and Mercy was killed but the French had suffered heavily. Ill health forced Enghien to retire soon afterwards, leaving Turenne for the third time in command of the French army. He was met by superior imperial forces and forced to retreat. At Philippsburg, Turenne crossed the Rhine using a bridge made of boats.

A month after his retreat, Turenne marched 120 miles to Trier, which he recaptured for its elector Philipp Christoph von Sötern after over a decade of imperialist occupation. Having taken control of the Moselle for France by this move, he set upon improving the defence of that river. Turenne now returned to France, where he was offered the Duchy of Château-Thierry, which had also been promised to his brother by Mazarin, who was trying to drive a wedge between Turenne and his rebellious brother, but Turenne saw what the cardinal was doing and accepted only if the transaction to his brother was completed.

In 1646, Turenne obtained more military successes. He decided to unite his forces with the Swedes under Carl Gustaf Wrangel. Mazarin, however, had made a deal with the Duke of Bavaria not to unite French and Swedish forces and not to cross the Rhine. In return, the Bavarians would not join the Imperial army. He ordered Turenne to besiege Luxembourg but Turenne correctly suspected the Duke of Bavaria of foul play and procrastinated. Soon the Bavarian army linked up with the Imperial forces, and Turenne tried to do the same to assist Wrangel. He was successful by using a detour via Wesel because there was no other bridge south of there he could use. In conjunction with Wrangel, Turenne marched unhindered up until the area between Memmingen and Landsberg am Lech. Their combined army invaded Bavaria by crossing the Danube and advanced as far as Munich and Bregenz, plundering their way through the country. This convinced the Elector of Bavaria to conclude a truce in March 1647. With these manoeuvres Napoleon said he displayed "great boldness, sagacity and genius; they are fertile in grand results, and ought to be studied by all military men".

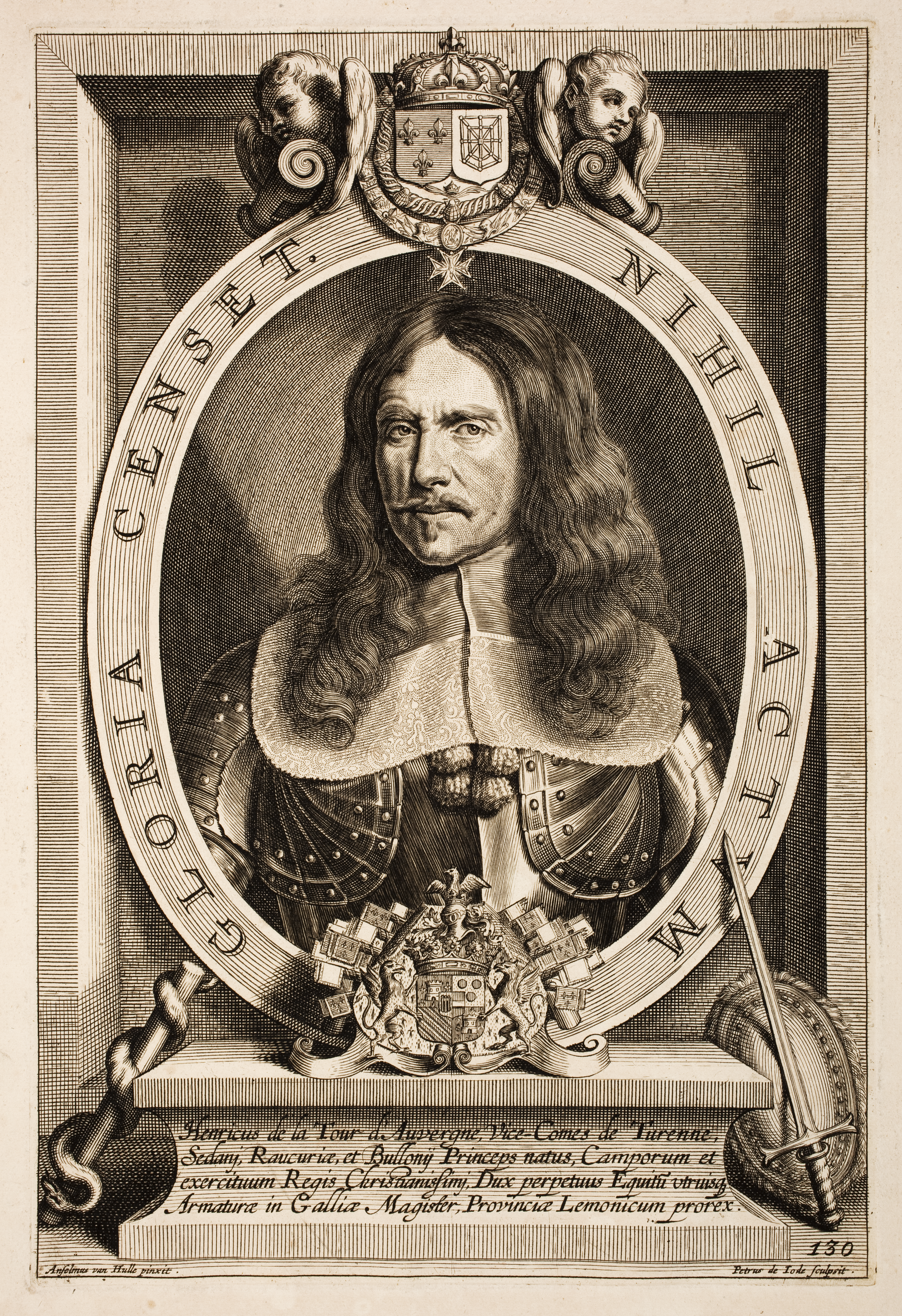
Turenne at the Peace of Westphalia, engraving after Anselm van Hulle.

In 1647 he proposed to attack the weakened army of the emperor, but he was ordered into Flanders instead. Not only did France thus lose an opportunity, but a serious mutiny broke out amongst the Weimar troops, who had not received their pay for six months. Rosen, who had been recently promoted to high office on Turenne's insistence, convinced the Weimarian cavalry to revolt, pretending to be held prisoner by them. Turenne had already left for Flanders with his main force but rode back with a small contingent, surprising the mutineers. Instead of destroying them with a surprise attack, he marched with them as if he was still in command and managed to secretly have Rosen arrested, after which the mutiny died down. He then marched into Luxembourg but soon received orders to switch to the Rhine. As Turenne predicted, Bavaria again joined the Imperial cause in 1647. He compelled the Imperials to lift the Siege of Worms and formally declared war on Bavaria. After joining with the Swedes, once again led by Wrangel, they moved together against the imperials. Scouts detected the imperials, and during the following night Turenne secretly moved his troops close to the imperials. The following day, 17 May, the imperials marched off unaware of the danger, resulting in their rearguard being caught isolated and defeated in a vicious battle at Zusmarshausen. Troops subsequently wasted Bavaria with fire and sword until a more secure pacification was obtained. This devastation, for which many modern writers have blamed Turenne, appeared no more harsh a measure than the spirit of the times and the circumstances of the case permitted. Turenne planned on moving into Austria and taking Vienna, but as the Peace of Westphalia had been signed, this campaign never materialized.

== The Fronde and the early reign of Louis XIV ==
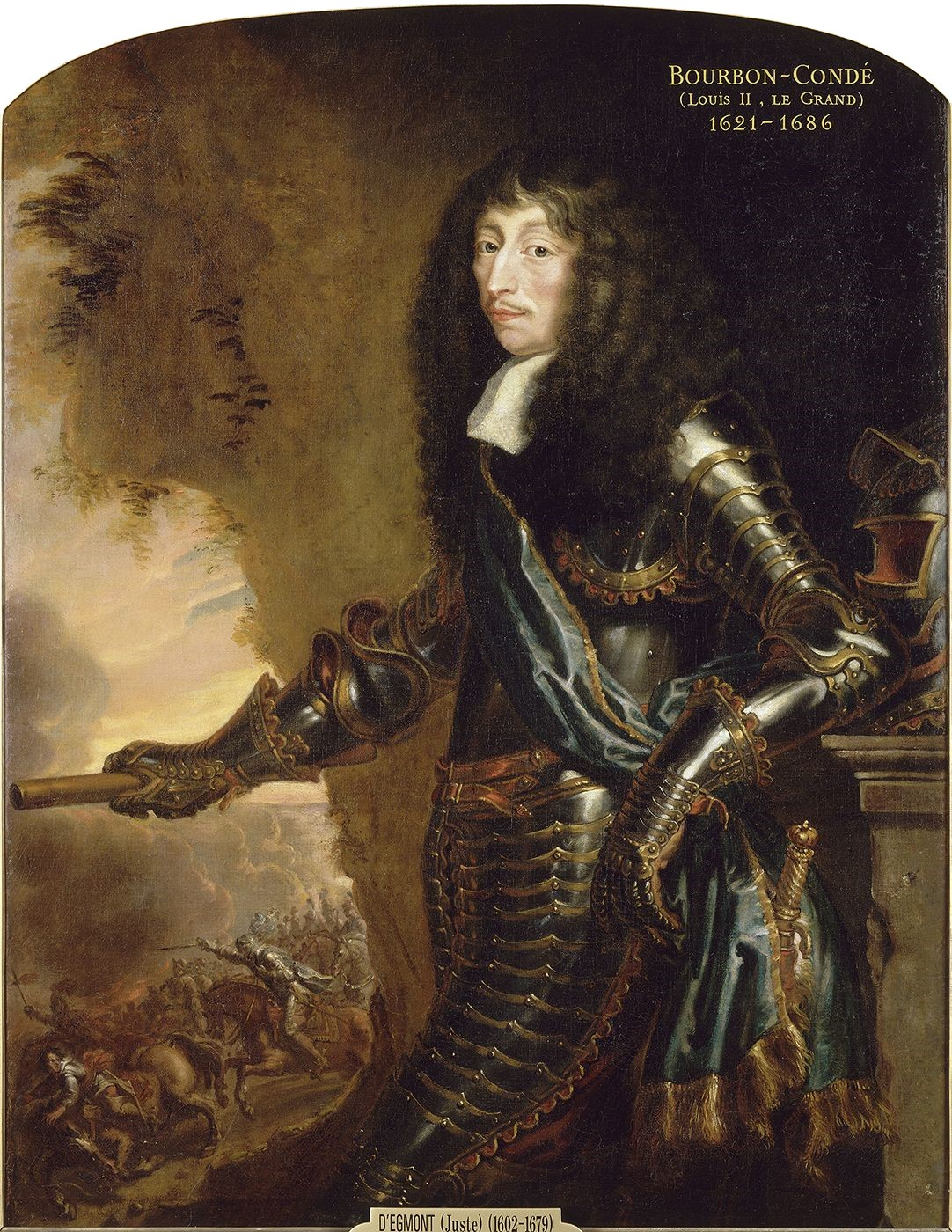
Louis de Bourbon, duc d'Enghien The Grand Condé

The Peace of Westphalia (1648) brought little peace to France, which soon became involved in the civil war of the Fronde (1648–1653). During the first war, he refused to join either side. Mazarin had him removed as commander of the army of Weimar causing Turenne to flee to the Netherlands, where he remained until the treaty of Rueil (March 1649) put an end to the first war of the Fronde. Louis, Grand Condé had made many enemies at court, especially Mazarin, which would eventually lead to conflict. While Condé had expected to be rewarded greatly for his military service, which had turned the Fronde in Mazarin's favour, Mazarin did not have a high opinion of Condé's accomplishments. Condé had recently inherited the princely title of Condé, won great fame and influence through his military actions, was made prince of the blood and had built strong connections among the members of the first Fronde. Now he and Mazarin were busy plotting each other's destruction. The second war erupted when Condé and some of his allies were arrested. Turenne, intended for arrest with them, escaped in time, and with the duchess de Longueville held Stenay for the cause of the "Princes"—Condé, his brother Conti, and his brother-in-law the Duc de Longueville. Love for the duchess seems to have ruled Turenne's action, both in the first war and, now, in seeking Spanish aid for the Princes. In this war, Turenne sustained one of his few reverses at Rethel (15 December 1650), but the second conflict ended in the early months of the following year with the collapse of the court party and the release of the Princes.

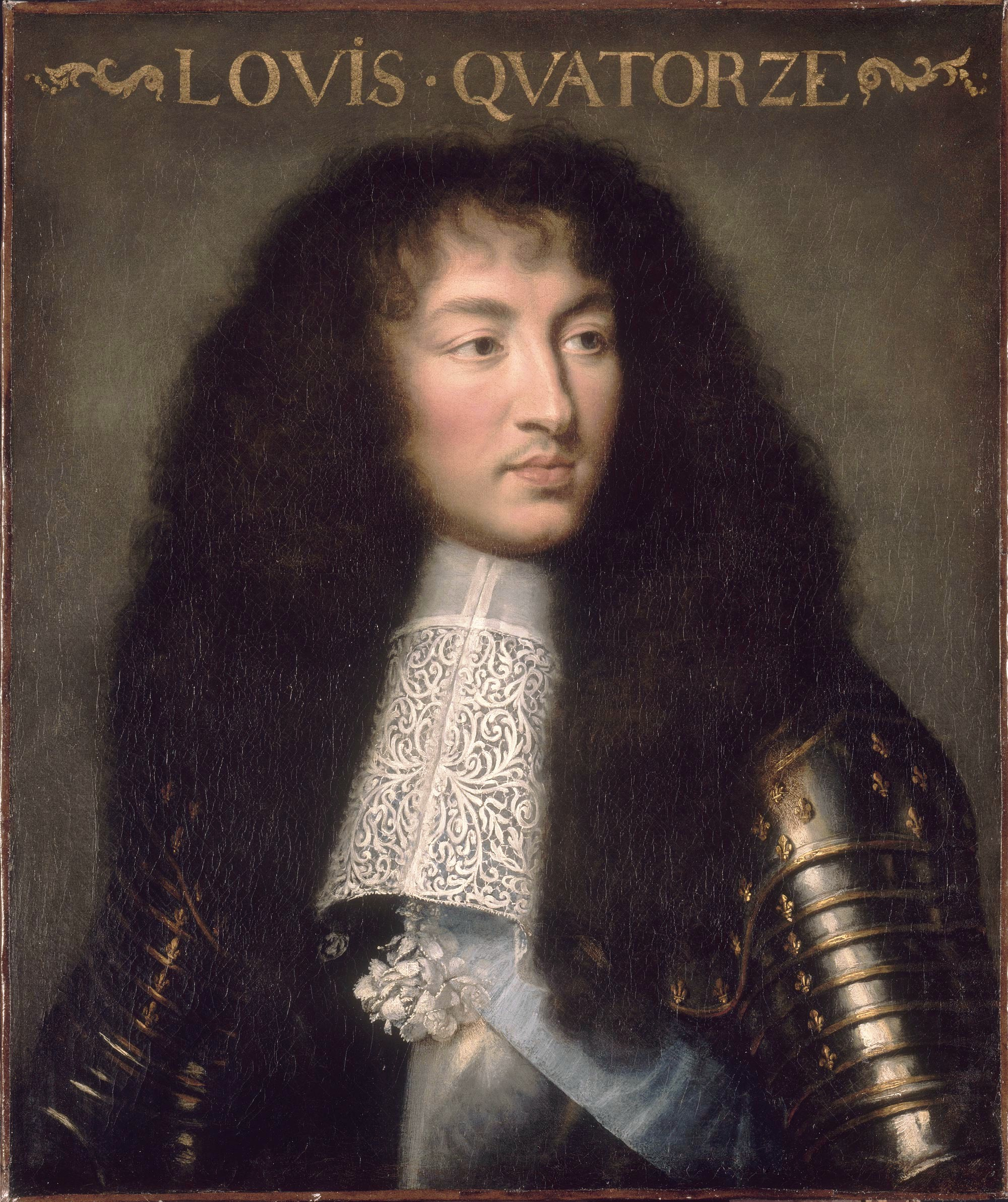
Louis XIV as king of France

Turenne reconciled and returned to Paris in May 1651, but the trouble soon revived, and Condé again raised the standard of revolt in the south of France. In this, the third war of the Fronde, Turenne and Condé stood opposed to each other, the marshal commanding the royal armies, the prince that of the Frondeurs and their Spanish allies. Turenne displayed the personal bravery of a young soldier at Jargeau (28 March 1652), the skill and wariness of a veteran general at Gien (7 April), and he practically crushed the civil war in the Battle of the Faubourg St Antoine (2 July) and in the re-occupation of Paris (21 October).

== Against Spain ==
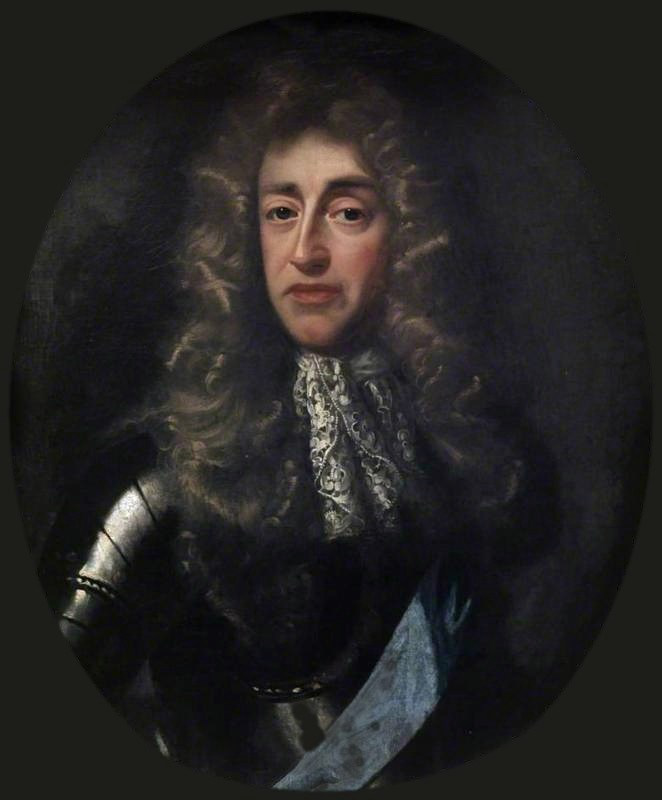
The duke of York and future king James of England

Turenne still needed to deal with Condé, who was fighting alongside the Spaniards. The long-drawn-out campaigns of the "Spanish Fronde" gave ample scope for the display of military skill by both the famous captains. In June 1653, Turenne and La Ferté marched against the Frondeurs. They had 7,000 infantry and 5,000 cavalry (or 6,000 infantry and 10,000 cavalry, according to a different source). Condé controlled 30,000 troops. Hearing that the Spanish army camped in two positions 120 miles apart, he rapidly marched on and captured Rethel, which lay between them. Now a Spanish force, the one not commanded by Condé, of 16,000 infantry and 11,000 cavalry arrived in the area. Turenne decided to shadow this force to prevent it from taking Paris with Condé, and limit their freedom of action until winter. The Spanish intended only to take a few forts, so Turenne was successful. At one point Condé was in a position to defeat Turenne but the Spanish commander did not allow Condé to attack. Eventually the Spanish managed to evade Turenne and captured Rocroi, but while they were doing this Turenne took Mouzon. He also took Sainte-Menehould.

Turenne started the 1654 campaign by moving on Stenay, one of the centres of the Fronde and personal property of Condé. Turenne had received reinforcement for the campaign and prepared vigorously to defend against a relief attempt. Instead, Condé and Archduke Leopold Wilhelm outmanoeuvred him by besieging the crucial fortress of Arras. As Condé and the Archduke had 25,000 troops, and Turenne could call on only 14,000-15,000, Turenne decided to wait until Stenay fell before moving against the Frondeurs in force. Turenne was not in sole command: the Duke of York, La Ferté, Broglie, and Hocquincourt all had authority as well. However, he overcame opposition to his plan to deal aggressively with the more numerous Spanish army. Turenne had tirelessly prepared for the attack. He scouted the enemy positions in person and realized the Spanish would take too long to decide whether to attack him or not. He provided religious services to his troops and explained to his officers the techniques to use against the elaborate Spanish defences. The Spanish were routed, losing 6,000 men and 63 cannons, while the French lost just 400 men. This victory was a turning point: from then on, the French had a marked advantage in the region.

Before the campaign of 1655, another important matter required Turenne's energies. Riots had broken out in Paris, combined with political disputes between the king and parliament; civil conflict threatened again. The king forbade parliament from meeting, while parliament, for their part, ignored this demand. At the invitation of the increasingly despotic Mazarin, Turenne was invited to negotiate, which he did successfully.

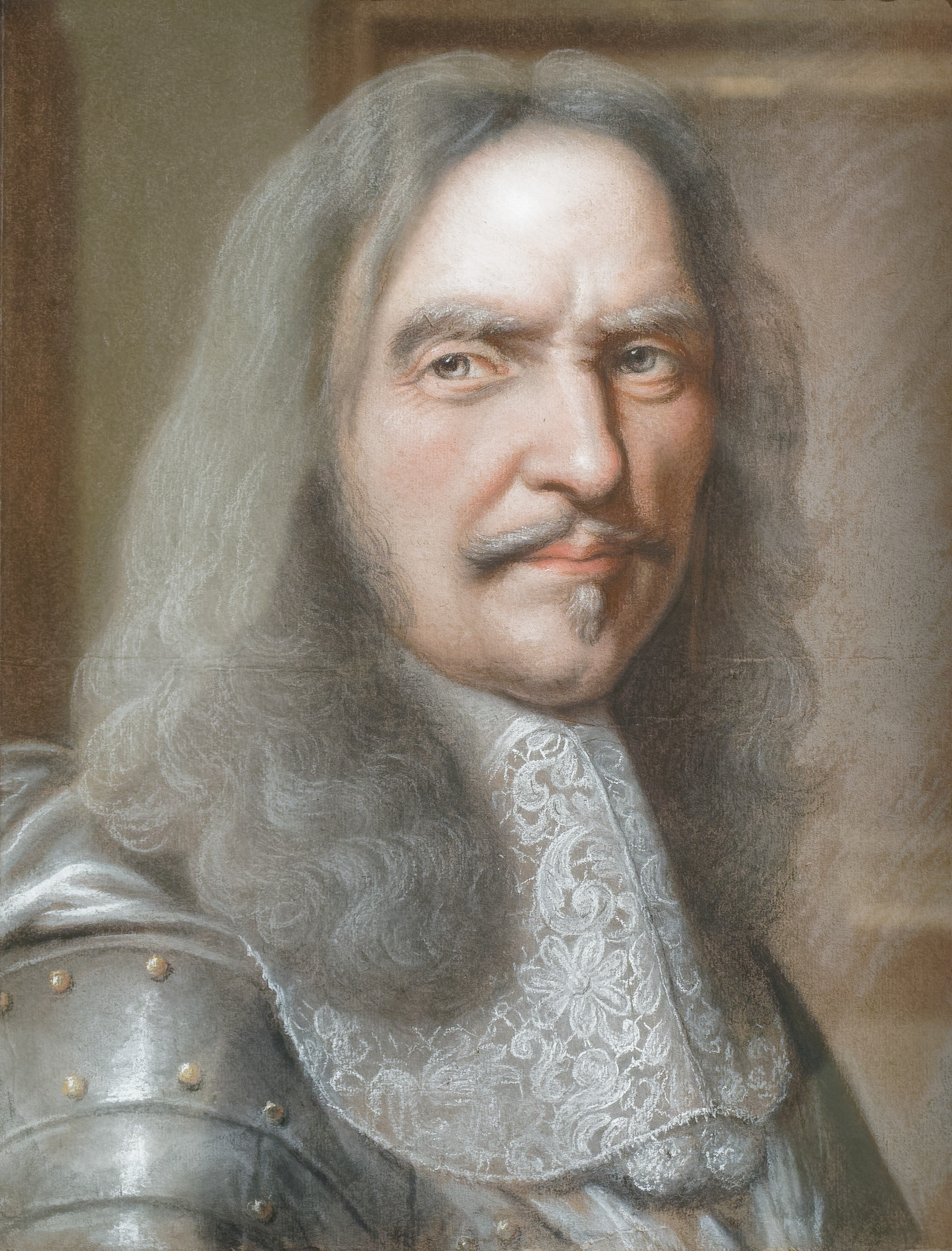
Turenne wearing armour

Turenne started the 1655 campaign by taking Landrecies. Soon after, Turenne almost captured Condé but the failure of a subordinate led to the latter's escape. Turenne then took the fortresses of Condé and St. Guislain before being recalled to the court at Compiègne. Hocquincourt had been robbed of his important position by Mazarin and was now approached by Condé. If Hocquincourt surrendered Ham and Peronne, which he was in charge of, the French position would be much weaker. Turenne could not move forces to the place due to the Spanish dispositions, but convinced Mazarin to negotiate with Hocquincourt, which succeeded.

At this point, Cromwell's England as well as Lorraine, up until now Spain's ally, joined the French side. Philip IV of Spain replaced the commanders who had been so unsuccessful in the last campaigns with the veteran commanders Marshal Caracena and Don John Joseph of Austria. In June, troops under Turenne and La Ferté surrounded Valenciennes, beginning the siege of that place. The Spanish broke the nearby dikes to flood Turenne's position but Turenne had the water diverted to flood part of the city. When Turenne observed the Spaniards preparing for an attack, he gave orders to prepare for an afternoon or nighttime attack. But La Ferté did not carry out the order, so when the Spanish attacked, his position was overrun in no more than 15 minutes. La Ferté and 4,400 troops were captured. Despite the confusion and darkness, Turenne managed to collect his forces and made an ordered retreat, though losing half his artillery. After twelve miles, Turenne ordered a halt. Seeing the French in battle array, the Spanish suspected a trap and, as a result, failed to attack. Despite this, Turenne was unable to save Condé and Quesnoy, but he did take La Chapelle, which Condé failed to relieve, and prevented the fall of St. Guislain.

In his later commentary, Napoleon criticized Turenne for the defeat at Valenciennes. He wrote that Turenne should have marched against the Spanish because the river split his army, and so he could not support La Ferté if the latter needed help.

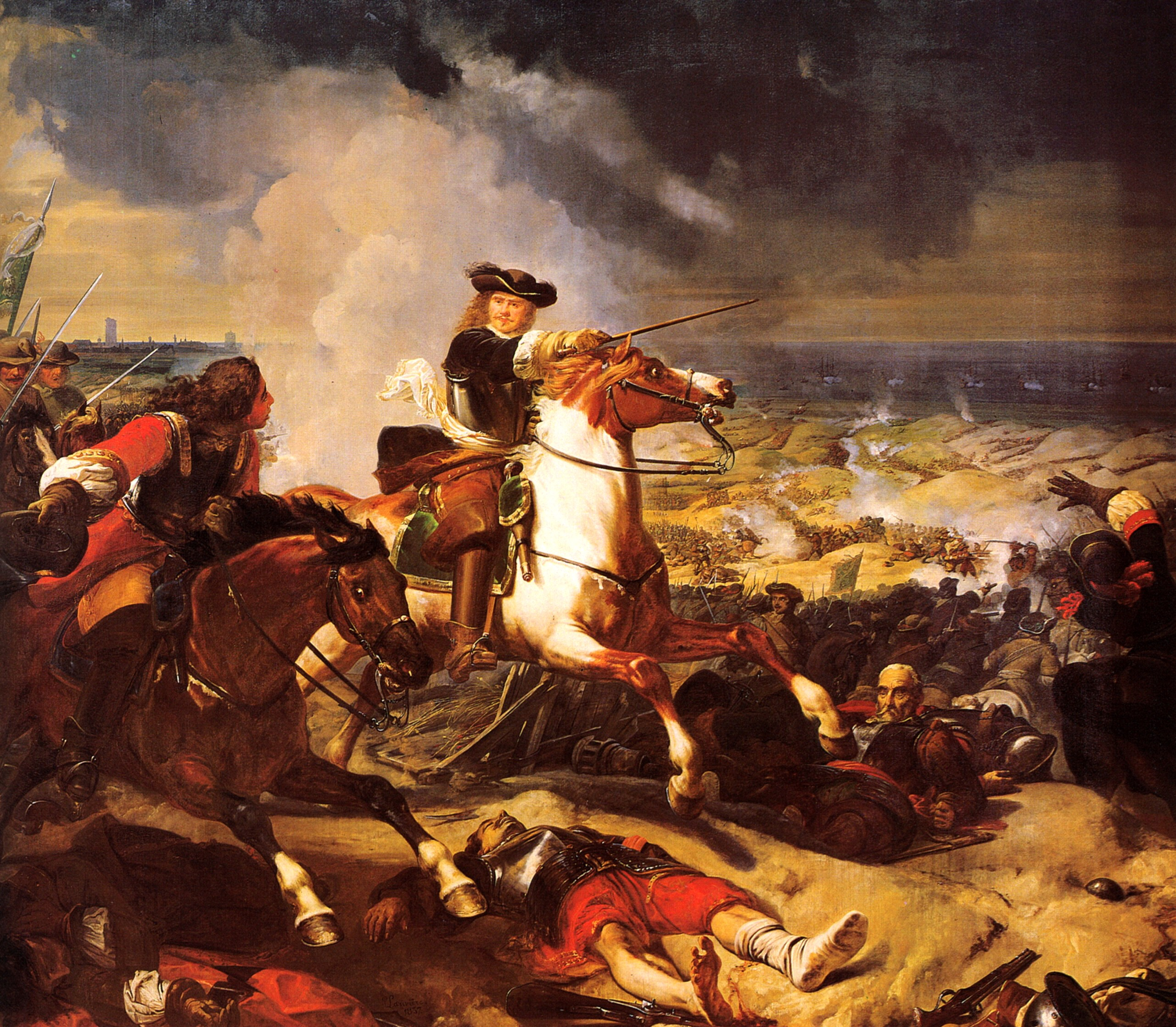
The Battle of the Dunes by Charles-Philippe Larivière. Galerie des Batailles, Palace of Versailles. In the foreground is Turenne on a Skewbald horse.

The war eventually concluded soon after Turenne's crushing victory at the Battle of the Dunes near Dunkirk in 1658, in which a corps of English veterans sent by Cromwell played a notable part (3–14 June); a victory which, followed by another successful campaign in 1658, led to the Treaty of the Pyrenees in 1659.

On the death of Mazarin in 1661, Louis XIV took the reins of government into his own hands, and as one of his first acts appointed Turenne "marshal-general of the camps and armies of the king". He had offered to revive the office of Constable of France (suppressed in 1627) in Turenne's favour if the marshal would become a Roman Catholic. Turenne declined. Born of Calvinist parents and educated a Protestant, he had refused to marry one of Richelieu's nieces in 1639 and subsequently rejected a similar proposal from Mazarin.

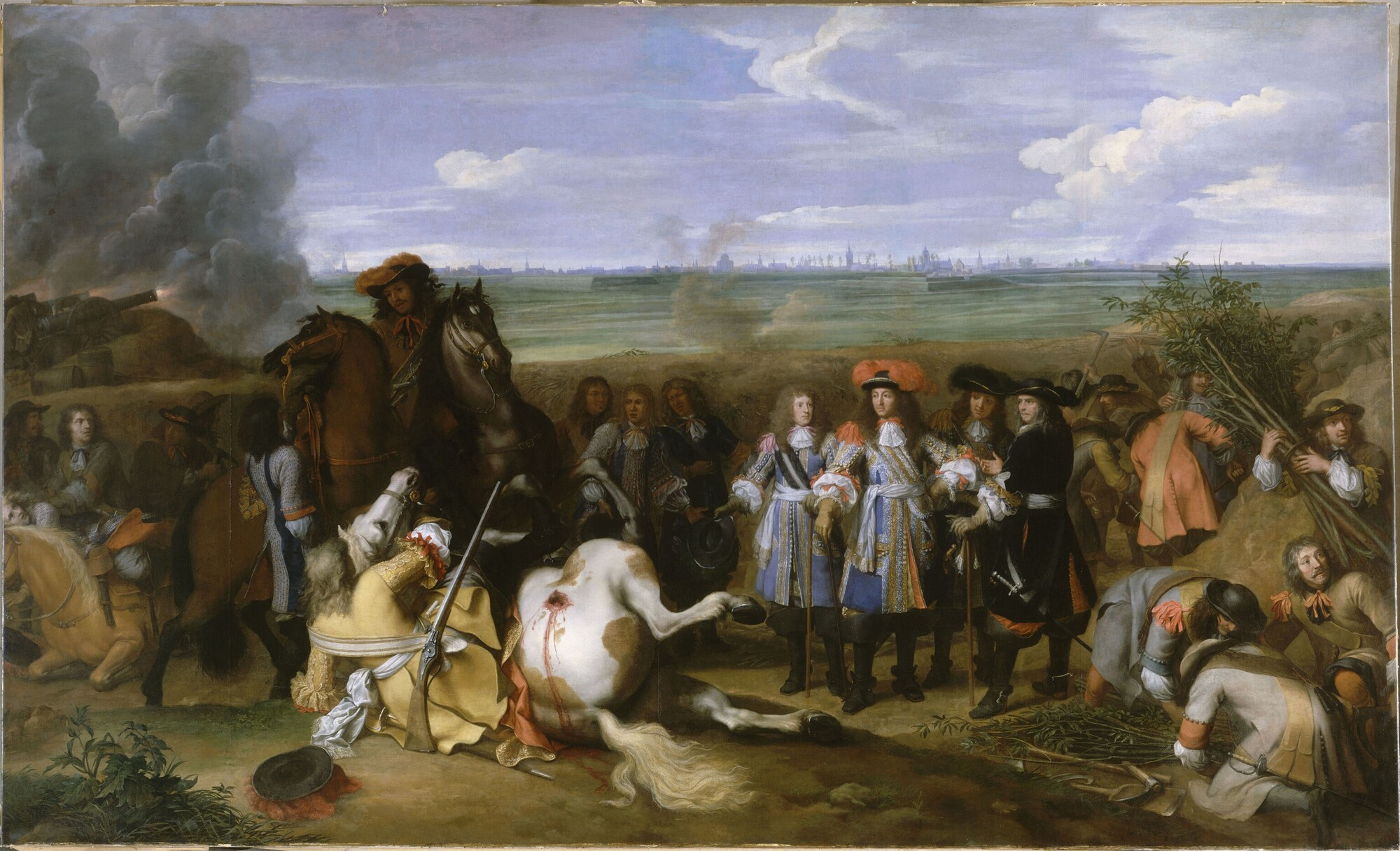
Louis XIV visiting a trench during the War of Devolution

In 1652, Turenne married Charlotte de Caumont, a daughter of the Protestant Marshal de la Force, to whom he remained deeply attached. But he sincerely deplored the division of Christianity into two hostile camps. He had always distrusted the influence of many dissident and uncontrolled sects; the history of independence in the English army and people made a deep impression on his mind, and the same fear of indiscipline which drove the English Presbyterians into royalism drew Turenne more and more towards the Roman Catholic Church. The letters between him and his wife show how closely both studied available evidence on the matter, and in the end, two years after her death, the eloquence of Bossuet and the persuasions of his nephew, the Cardinal de Bouillon, persuaded him to become Catholic in October 1668.

In 1667 he had returned to the more congenial air of the "Camps and Armies of the King", directing (nominally under Louis XIV) the famous Promenade Militaire in which the French overran the Spanish Netherlands. Soon afterwards, Condé, now reconciled with the king, rivalled Turenne's success by the rapid conquest of the Franche-Comté, shortly before the end of the War of Devolution in February 1668.

== The Dutch War ==
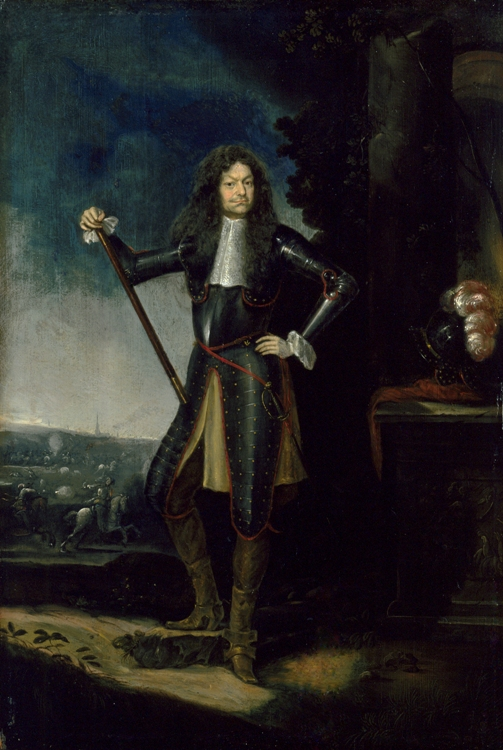
Raimondo Montecuccoli

In Louis XIV's Dutch War of 1672, Turenne accompanied the army commanded by the king, which overran the Dutch United Provinces up to the gates of Amsterdam. The terms offered by Louis to the Prince of Orange only aroused a more bitter resistance.

The Dutch opened the dikes and flooded the countryside around Amsterdam. This measure completely checked Turenne, whom the king had left in command. News of this event roused Europe to action, and the conflict spread to Germany. Turenne fought a successful war of manoeuvre on the middle Rhine while Condé covered Alsace.

In January 1673, he assumed the offensive, penetrated far into Germany, and forced the Great Elector of Brandenburg to make peace. Later in the year, Turenne sought to prevent an Imperial army, commanded by General Raimondo Montecuccoli, from linking up with the Dutch. However, he received instructions that he protested were contradictory: he was ordered to bar Montecuccoli's army from reaching the Dutch Netherlands, while guarding Alsace and avoiding harm to neutral German states that might drive them into the enemy camp. Outnumbered and undersupplied, Turenne's army was unable to stop Montecuccoli from joining the Dutch and capturing the important place of Bonn.

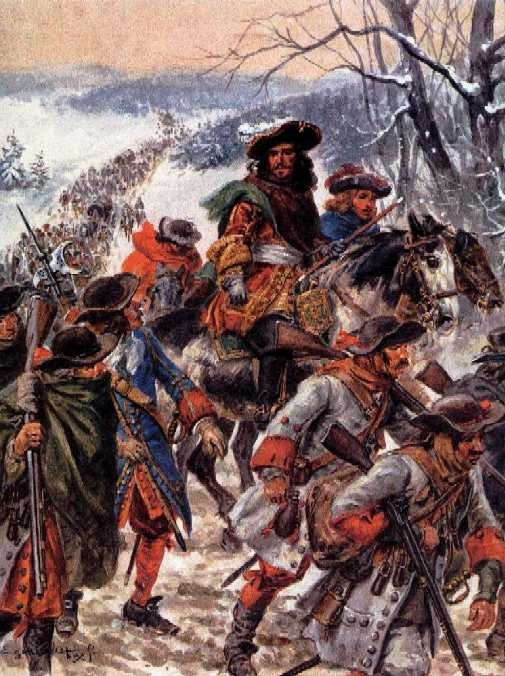
Turenne at the battle of Turckheim

In June 1674, Turenne won the battle of Sinzheim, which made him master of the Electorate of the Palatinate. Under orders from Paris, the French wasted the country far and wide. In the autumn, the anti-French allies again advanced, and though they again outmanoeuvred Turenne, the action of the neutral city of Strasbourg occasioned his failure by permitting the enemy to cross the Rhine by the bridge at that place. The battle of Enzheim followed; this proved a strategic victory for Turenne but hardly affected the situation, and, at the beginning of December, the allies remained in Alsace. The old marshal now made the most daring campaign of his career. A swift and secret march in mid-winter from one end of the Vosges to the other took the allies by surprise. Sharply following up his first successes, Turenne drove the enemy to Turkheim, and there inflicted upon them a heavy defeat (5 January 1675). As revenge for the active resistance the inhabitants of the city had shown, Turenne let his troops loot it. In a few weeks he had completely recovered Alsace.

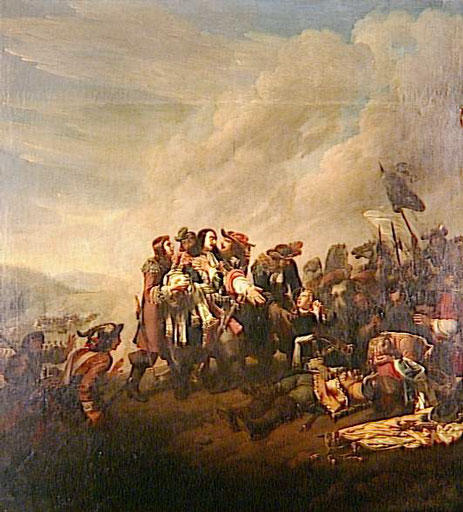
Turenne's death at the battle of Salzbach

In the summer campaign he once more faced Montecuccoli, and after the highest display of "strategic chess moves" by both commanders, Turenne finally compelled his opponent to offer battle at a disadvantage at Salzbach. There, on 27 July 1675, he was struck by an imperial cannonball while scouting enemy positions and killed instantly. Thomas de Longueville writes: "Twice he opened his eyes, and then he closed them forever." The news of his death produced universal sorrow.

== Legacy ==
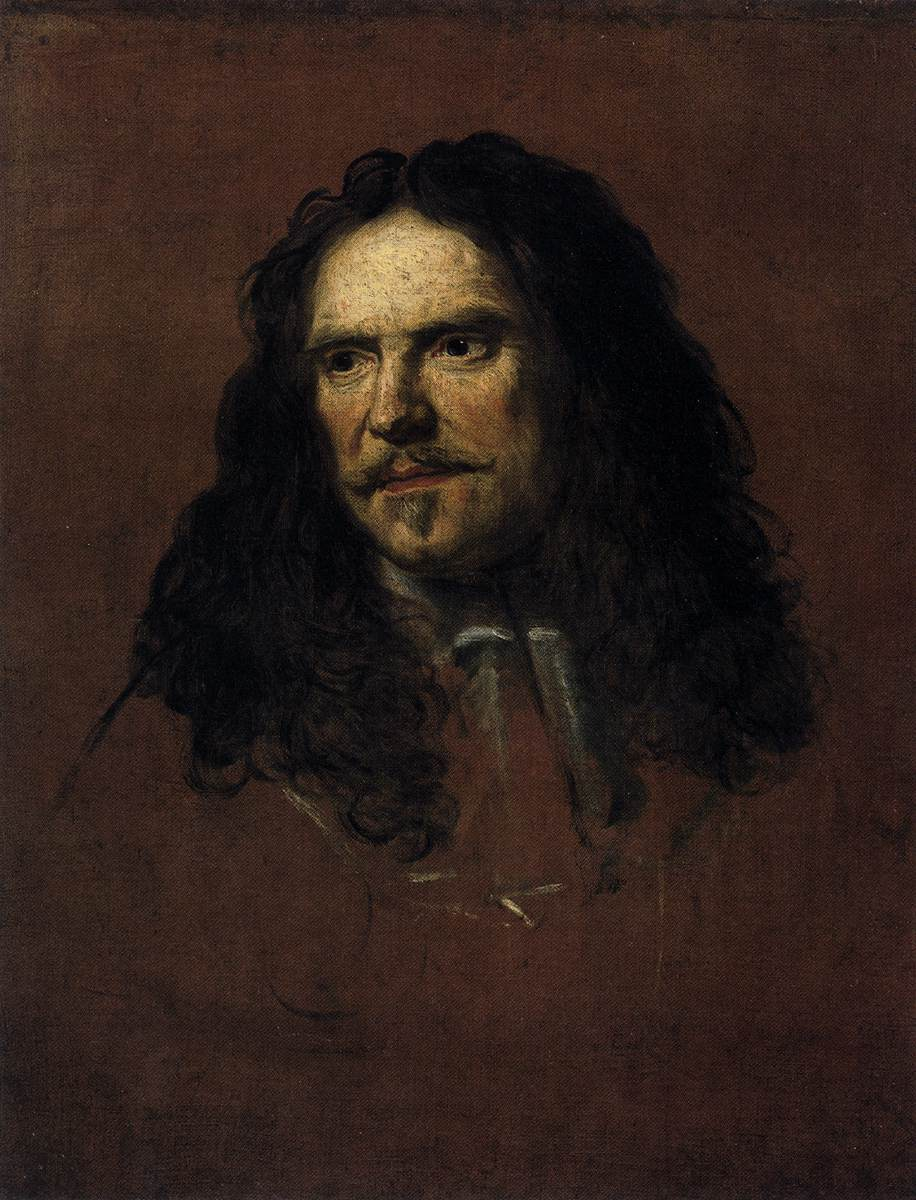
Portrait of Turenne by Charles Le Brun, c. 1665

Turenne's most eloquent countrymen wrote his éloges, and Montecuccoli himself exclaimed, "Il est mort aujourd'hui un homme qui faisait honneur à l'homme" (A man is dead today who did honour to Man). His body, taken to St Denis, was buried with the Kings of France. Even the revolutionaries of 1793 respected it, and, while they reburied the bodies of the monarchs in a mass grave, they preserved the remains of Turenne at the Jardin des Plantes until 22 September 1800, when Napoleon had them removed to the church of the Invalides at Paris, where they still rest.

Napoleon recommended that all soldiers "read and re-read" the campaigns of Turenne as one of the great captains of history, considering him much better than Frederick the Great. He reportedly remarked: "In Frederick's place he would have accomplished much more, and he would not have committed the King's mistakes. Turenne's genius would have been just as superior for conducting grand armies as well as small ones. His fame as a general rivalled that of any other in Europe at a period when the populace studied war more critically than ever before, for his military character epitomized the art of war of his time (Prince de Ligne). Strategic caution and logistic accuracy, combined with a brilliant dash in small combats and constancy under all circumstances—of success or failure—perhaps emerge as the salient points of Turenne's genius for war. Great battles he avoided. "Few sieges and many combats" he used as his maxim. And, unlike his great rival Condé, who appeared as brilliant in his first battle as in his last, Turenne improved day by day. Napoleon said of him that his genius grew bolder as it grew older, and a later author, the Duke of Aumale (Histoire des princes de la maison de Condé), took the same view when he wrote: "To know him, you must follow him up to Salzbach. In his case, every day signalled some progress”.

Turenne was regarded as a reserved and honourable soldier, known for his tact and relative indifference to court politics. His personal conduct was considered more austere than was common among the French aristocracy of his time. He spent much of his career with his troops, earning their loyalty through a combination of strict discipline and personal generosity. Although Condé was considered the more versatile military commander, Turenne was often regarded as a leading representative of 17th-century military art. His style of command was particularly suited to the small, professional armies and dynastic warfare of the reign of Louis XIV.

During the French Revolution, his reputation as a man of the people made his tomb one of the few nobles’ tombs not destroyed by the Revolutionaries. Napoleon rated him the greatest modern commander. Eugene of Savoy when praised above Turenne called the flattery ingratiating at the expense of Turenne. Turenne is one of the subjects of Morris’ work “Great commanders of modern times”. According to him, the “powerful genius” of Turenne greatly contributed to shaping modern warfare.

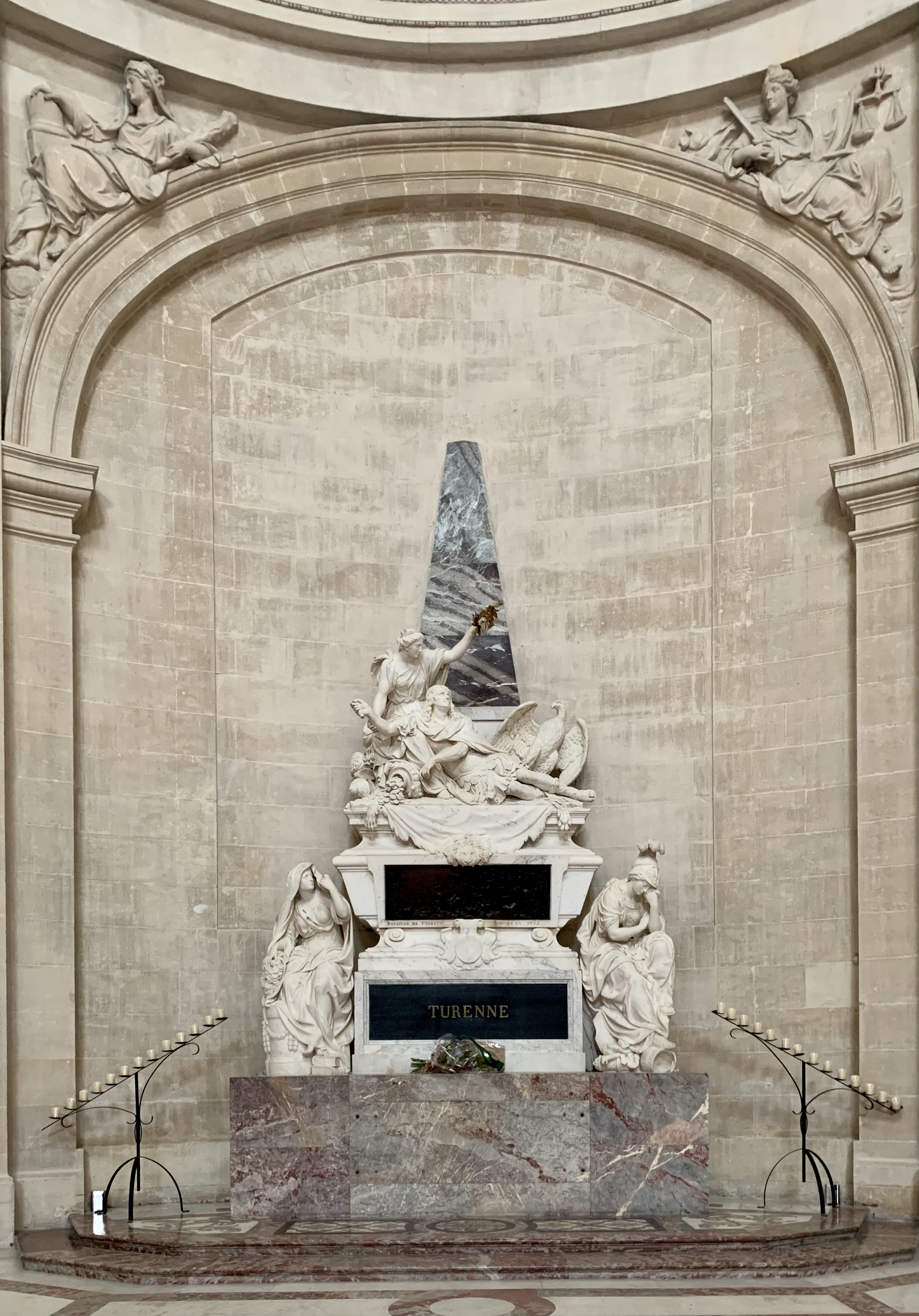
Turennes's tomb in Les Invalides

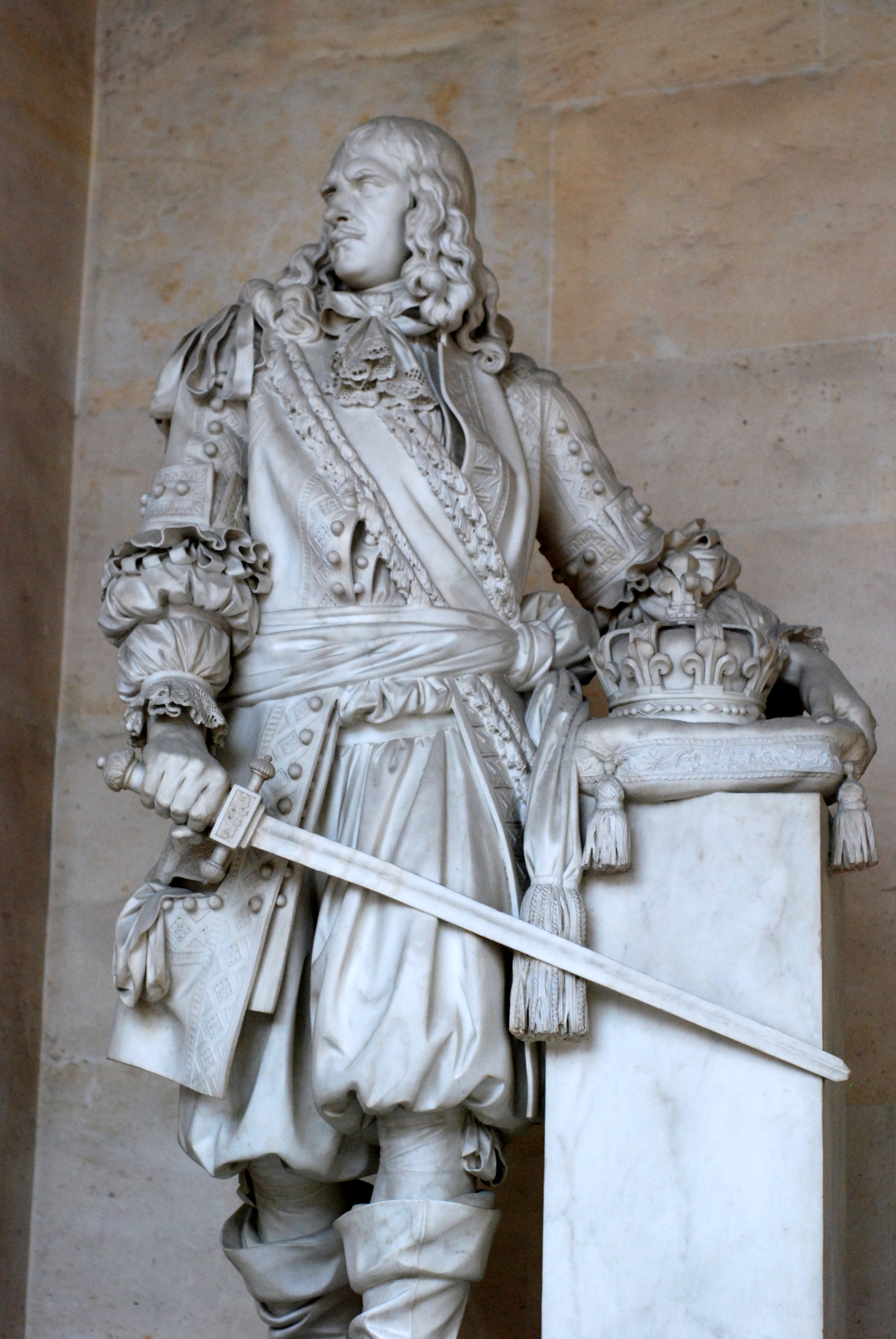
Statue of Turenne in Versailles

== In fiction ==
Marshal of France Turenne is depicted in several volumes of the alternate history novels in the 1632 series written by Eric Flint and David Weber. These include 1633 and 1634: The Baltic War. Turenne also appears in a historical novel by G.A. Henty called Won by the Sword.

== Sources ==
- Beach (1914). "Conde, Louis II of Bourbon, Prince of" . In Beach, Chandler B. (ed.). The New Student's Reference Work . Chicago: F. E. Compton and Co. p. 439–440.
- Brown, Daniel (27 September 2018). "The 7 best military commanders of all time, according to Napoleon Bonaparte". Business Insider.
- Elliott, Ivo D'Oyly (23 July 2020). "Henri de La Tour d'Auvergne, vicomte de Turenne | French military leader". Encyclopedia Britannica.
- Hozier, Sir Henry Montague (1885). Turenne. Chapman and Hall.
- Jagt, Arnold (2011), Book Reviews from Original Ads: A list of books for young people by G. A. Henty, archived from the original on 18 November 2012
- Longueville, Thomas (1907). Marshal Turenne. Robarts - University of Toronto. London: Longmans, Green.
- Luvaas, Jay (2001). Napoleon On the Art of War. Simon and Schuster. ISBN 978-0684872711.
- Lynn, John A. (2013). The Wars of Louis XIV 1667-1714. Taylor & Francis. ISBN 978-1317899518.
- Morris, William O'Connor (1891). Great commanders of modern times and The campaign of 1815. University of California Libraries. London, Calcutta, W.H. Allen.
- Ramsey, Andrew Michael; James II, King of England; La Moussaye, François de Goyon de Matignon; Pre-1801 Imprint Collection (Library of Congress) DLC (1735). The history of Henri de La Tour d'Auvergne, viscount de Turenne, marshal-general of France ... London: Printed by J. Bettenham, [etc.]
- Prince Eugene; Shand, Alexander Innes (2014). Eugene of Savoy: Marlborough's Great Military Partner-Memoirs of Prince Eugene of Savoy and Prince Eugene-Soldier of Fortune. Leonaur Limited. ISBN 978-1-78282-308-7.

Attribution:
