= House of Monchy =

Aristocratic family beginning in 16th century in Picardy, France

Monchy
- Former Mayor S. J. R. de Monchy puts the first spade into the ground at the Vegetable Market, The Hague, for the building of a new city hall.
- Current region: France
- Origin: Picardie

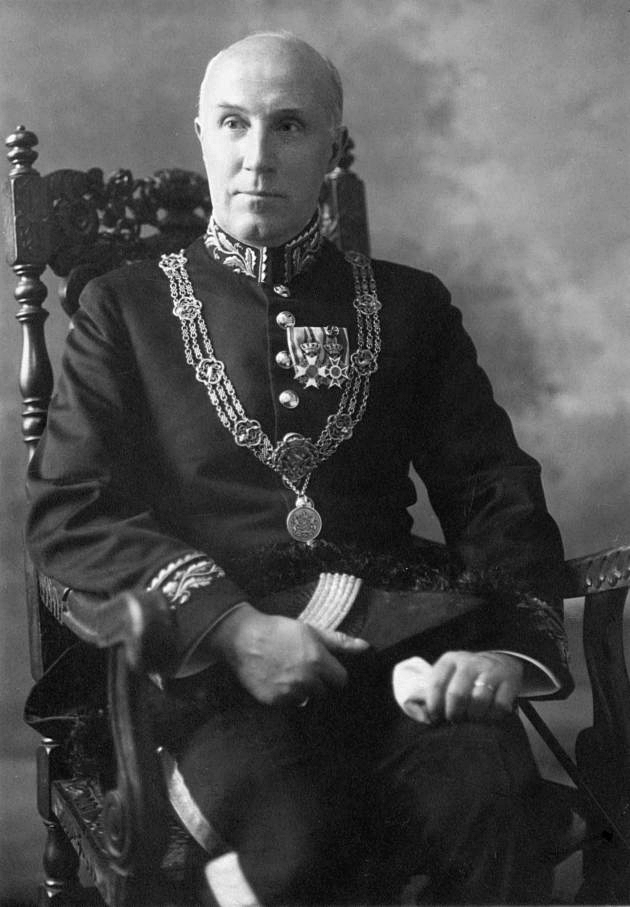
Salomon de Monchy, 1934

The House of Monchy is a French aristocratic family, originated in Picardy, France.

== Notable members ==
- Jean de Monchy, Seigneur de Sénarpont (1500–1563), lieutenant-general of Picardy from 1559 to 1563
- Charles de Monchy d'Hocquincourt (1599–1658), 17th-century French military leader
- François Willem de Monchy (1749–1796), physician at Rotterdam
- Marinus and René de Monchy, of Rotterdam, 19th-century leading Dutch business men
- Salomon de Monchy (1880–1961), burgomaster of Arnhem 1921 to 1934 and of The Hague 1934 to 1947
