= Turenne's winter campaign =

1674–75 campaign in the Franco-Dutch War

- Part of the Franco-Dutch War
Date	December 1674 – January 5, 1675
Location	France
Result	French victory: Holy Roman Empire expelled from Alsace

Belligerents
France	Holy Roman Empire; Brandenburg-Prussia

Commanders and leaders
(Kingdom of France) Vicomte de Turenne	(Holy Roman Empire) Alexander von Bournonville (Holy Roman Empire) Charles IV, Duke of Lorraine; Frederick William, Elector of Brandenburg

Strength
Initial: 20,000–28,000 men Total: 33,000 men	Initial: 57,000 men Total: 70,000 men

Turenne's winter campaign took place during the Franco-Dutch War of 1672-78. During December 1674 and January 1675, Henri de la Tour d'Auvergne, Vicomte de Turenne, led French forces on a flank march that resulted in the defeat of an army fielded principally by the Holy Roman Empire and in that army's expulsion from Alsace.

== Background ==
The Franco-Dutch War largely stemmed from the desires of King Louis XIV to achieve glory through military victory and to punish the Netherlands for what he perceived to be Dutch betrayal during the War of Devolution (1667–68). The Dutch had started that war as a French ally but, faced with Louis's growing territorial ambitions, had ended by allying with England and Sweden to curb French expansionism. Pressure from this new alliance forced Louis to accept a compromise end to the War of Devolution. Louis then paid off Sweden and England to abandon the alliance. In 1672, France invaded the Netherlands, but the Dutch managed to bog down the French advance. Soon other powers, including the Holy Roman Empire, joined the war against France.

While the main campaign of 1674 was being fought in the Netherlands, Leopold I, Holy Roman Emperor, sought to open a second front against France in Alsace. Much of this province was under French control, but parts of it were not, such as the free city of Strasbourg.

An Imperial army under Field Marshal Alexander von Bournonville crossed the Rhine River into Alsace at Strasbourg in September 1674. Turenne attacked the Imperials on October 4 at Entzheim with a smaller force. Although the battle was indecisive tactically, it prompted Bournonville to end the 1674 campaign and enter winter quarters. There he was reinforced by troops provided by Frederick William, Elector of Brandenburg. King Louis attempted to strengthen Turenne's army, but met with mixed success. Prince Louis, Grand Condé sent 20 infantry battalions and 24 cavalry squadrons from his army in the north; this helped Turenne, but he was still heavily outnumbered. The king also invoked the arriere ban, a relic of feudal times calling on French nobles to support the monarchy with levies. Over 5,000 men assembled at Nancy, but they were undisciplined and useless to Turenne, who had them disbanded in November.

== Turenne's plan ==
Armies in the Seventeenth Century generally campaigned between April and October and avoided combat during the winter. Bad weather made movement of artillery and supplies difficult as autumn rains and spring floods turned roads to mud. Food and kindling for the men were hard to come by in the winter, as was fodder for animals. Armies entered winter quarters in the late autumn and began to campaign again in the spring. Bournonville carried on this tradition in 1674 by moving his army of around 57,000 men into camps mainly in the rich region around Colmar in southern Alsace. He expected his opponent to also suspend operations over the winter.

Turenne's army was encamped between Saverne and Haguenau in northern Alsace. However, the French were not really in winter quarters. The French military administration under Francois-Michel le Tellier, Marquis de Louvois, had so reformed the army's supply system that French troops could campaign all year. As he explained to King Louis, Turenne determined to use this advantage over the enemy army by marching around its flank and launching a surprise attack in the dead of winter.

== French deception ==
Turenne took steps to allay any suspicions Bournonville might have about French intentions. The French fortresses in Middle Alsace were put in a state of defence, as if the French were settling in for the winter. Turenne marched his field army southwest—away from the enemy. Once the reinforcements from Conde's army arrived, Turenne commanded a total of 33,000 men. He split his force into smaller units to confuse enemy agents. Each unit was given specific instructions on the route it was to take; however, Turenne did not divulge his ultimate aim. He kept the Vosges Mountains between his men and the enemy, and used his cavalry to further screen his manoeuvre.

== Winter march ==
The French field army left its camps near Saverne at the beginning of December 1674 and moved into Lorraine. Turenne requisitioned large amounts of grain and other foodstuffs, ruthlessly ignoring the complaints of the local authorities that he was stripping the province of food. The march led through Sarrebourg and Baccarat, and reached Epinal on December 18.

In Alsace, Bournonville and his allies argued over what to do. Some generals wanted to continue campaigning in the winter and attack Saverne or Haguenau. The Elector of Brandenburg preferred to move south and take Belfort. The exiled Charles IV, Duke of Lorraine sought to reclaim his province. He sent troops to take Remiremont and Epinal. As Turenne's forces approached the latter, the duke's men fled.

As news of the French march was reported to the enemy commanders, Turenne sought to further confuse them about where the French were going. Detachments left the main body and moved east, into the Vosges. They made a show of attacking through the mountain passes, including Col du Bonhomme and Col de la Schlucht. Although enemy troops retreated under their pressure, the French had no intention of pressing home these attacks.

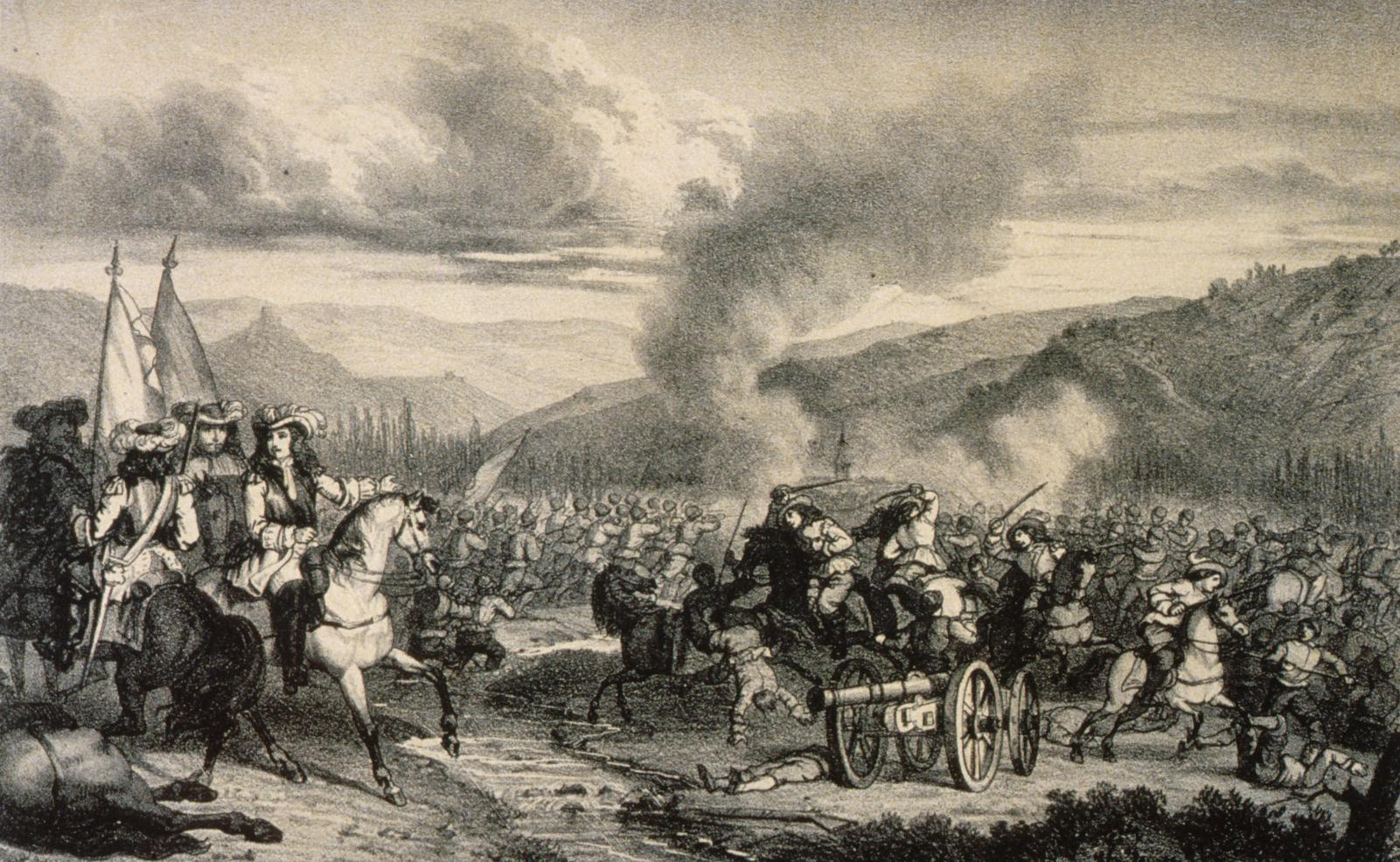
19th century engraving of the Battle of Turckheim

After Epinal, Turenne turned southeast. Snow and bad roads slowed the advance, as the men tired and food ran short. The French main body marched through Remiremont, meeting no resistance from the troops of the Duke of Lorraine, and entered Belfort on December 27. The French had now come to the southern end of the Vosges. From there, Turenne moved northeast, reaching Mulhouse in southern Alsace on December 29. Taking an enemy detachment by surprise there, Turenne gained a quick victory at the Battle of Mulhouse. As the new year began, the French struck due north at the enemy headquarters near Colmar. At the Battle of Turckheim on January 5, 1675, Turenne decisively defeated Bournonville. The latter was forced to evacuate Alsace and cross back over the Rhine at Strasbourg.

== Assessment ==
A French soldier said that Turenne's manoeuvre during the winter campaign was "one of the best concerted Stratagems and at the same Time one of the greatest Actions that ever was done by any General." Even though he was 64 years old, Turenne boldly decided to flout convention by campaigning in winter. Other generals might lose their edge with age, but Napoleon said of Turenne that his "audacity grew with years and experience." He ably used the natural feature of the Vosges to mask his march. His campaign anticipated similar manoeuvres that would later be carried out by such great generals as Napoleon and Stonewall Jackson.
