= Battle of Bléneau =

Engagement during the Second Fronde

- Part of the Fronde
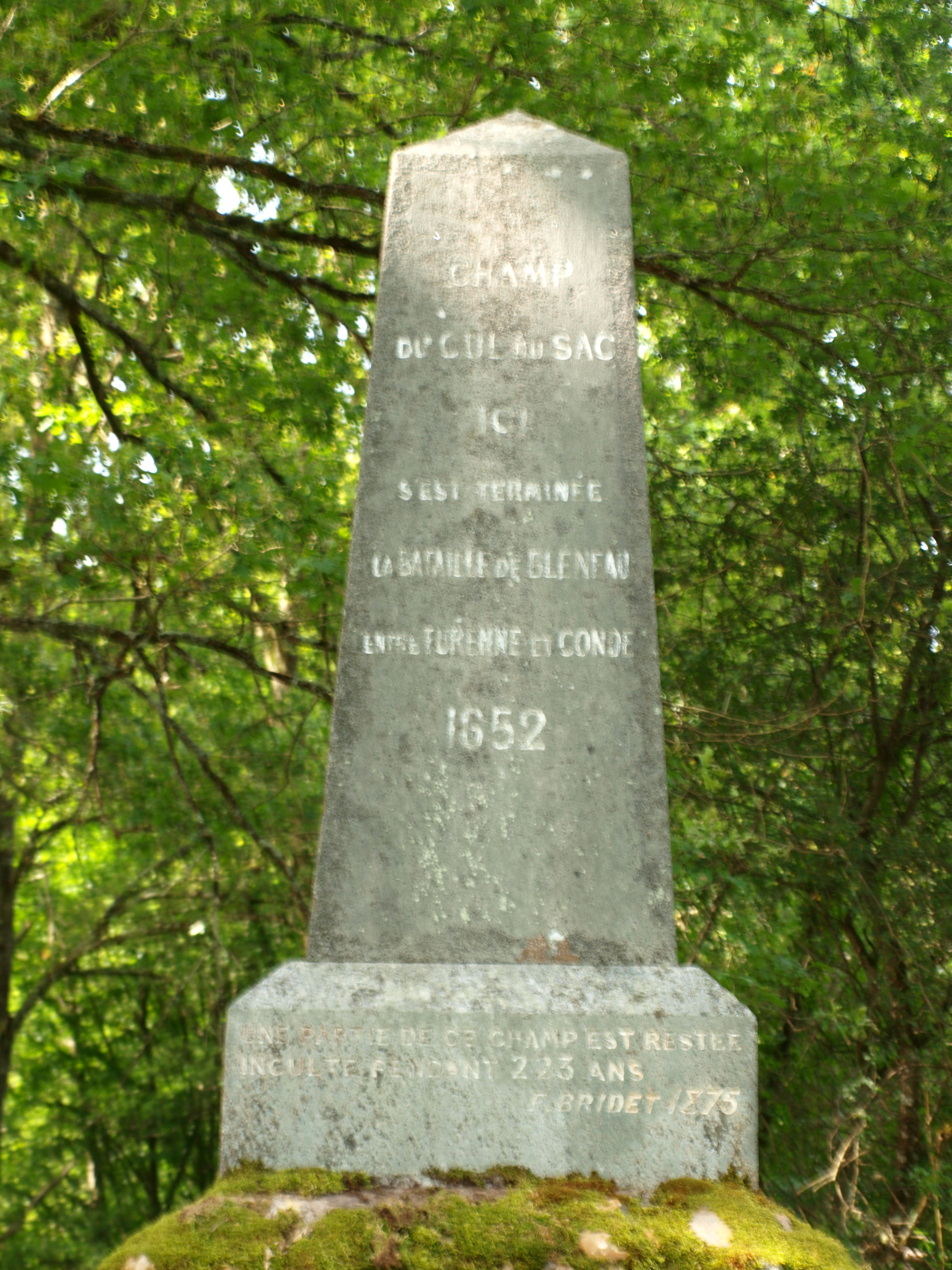
Date	7 April 1652
Location	Bléneau, France
Result	Inconclusive

Belligerents
(Kingdom of France) Royalists	Condé rebels

Commanders and leaders
(Kingdom of France) Henri de Turenne (Kingdom of France) Charles de Monchy	Louis, Grand Condé

Strength
4,000	14,000

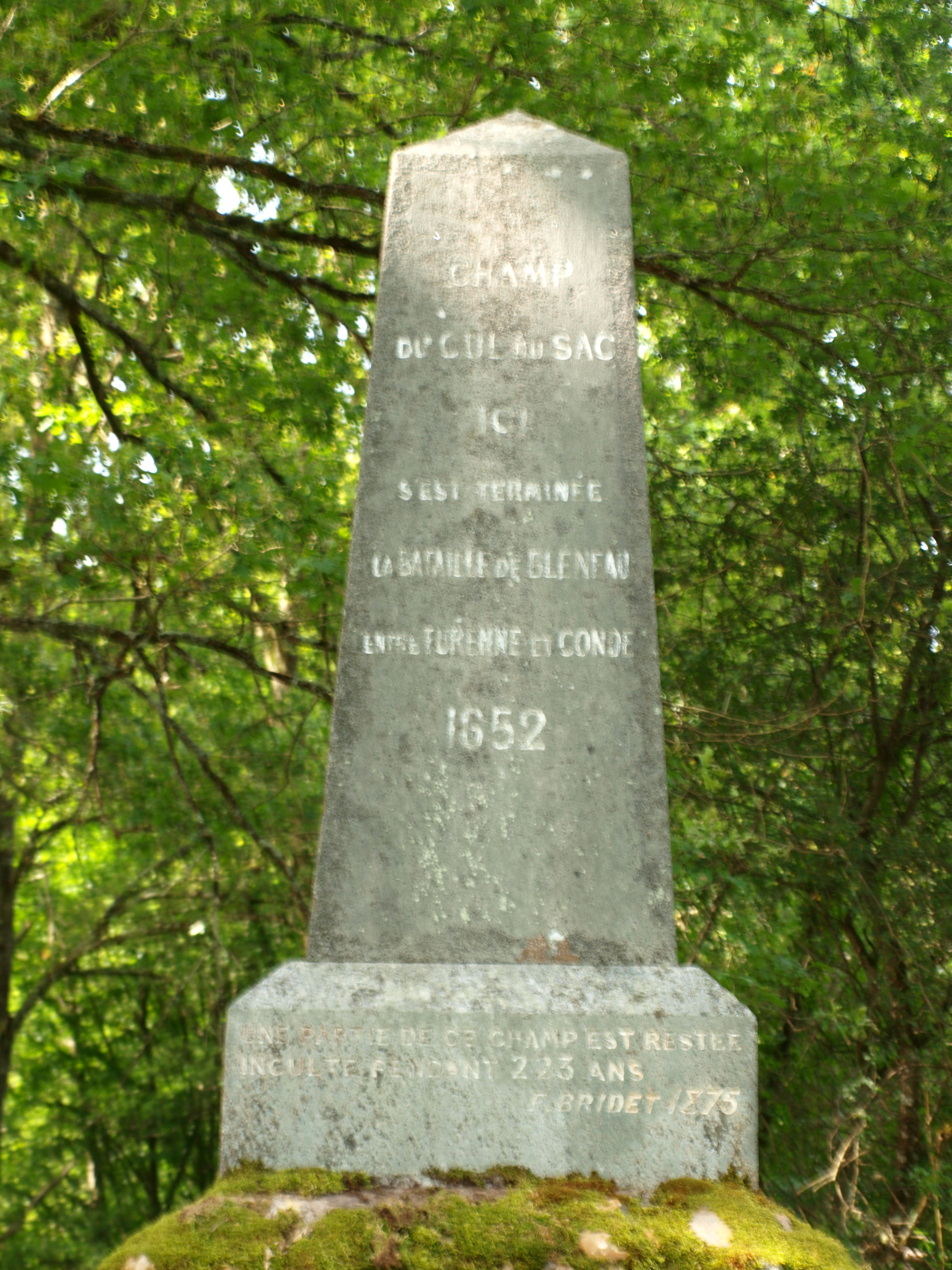
A stone reading 'Champ du Cul-de-Sac: Here ended the Battle of Bléneau between Turenne and Condé'

The Battle of Bléneau was a battle of the Second Fronde fought on April 7, 1652, near Bléneau in France between the armies of the rebel Louis II de Bourbon, Prince de Condé and the Royalist Henri de la Tour d'Auvergne, Vicomte de Turenne. Condé destroyed part of the Royalist army but failed to exploit his victory, retreating to Paris. Turenne regrouped and laid siege to the rebels at Étampes.

During the first four months of 1652, Condé's attempts to conquer Aquitaine were thwarted by royalist troops led by the Count of Harcourt. Upon receiving intelligence that the royal court was travelling toward Paris, Condé left the southwest along with his supporters, among them La Rochefoucauld. On the first of April, he was reinforced at Lorris by troops led by the Duke of Nemours and the force that Gaston of Orleans had given command of to the Duke of Beaufort. Orleans and Beaufort, despite being brothers-in-law, got along poorly. Therefore, Condé took command of the combined rebel army.

The royal army's disposition was as such: the court was at Gien, Turenne was at Briare, while Marshall Charles de Monchy d'Hocquincourt had imprudently advanced his forces to the village of Bléneau. There, he quartered his troops. Condé ambushed the Marshall's soldiers during the night of April 6/7th and destroyed part of the royal army, compelling d'Hocquincourt to withdraw toward Auxerre. For several hours, the royal court feared being taken prisoner in Gien. In the morning, however, Turenne, despite his numerical disadvantage against Condé, counter-attacked. Exploiting the terrain, the royalists got the better of the rebels. Condé withdrew toward Paris with what remained of his force.

Among the rebel casualties was Nemours, who was wounded in the thigh amidst the fighting.

Victory was claimed by both sides, but Turenne had ensured the safety of the king and managed to thwart Condé's plans. The latter reached Paris by April 11 and quartered his forces there.

== Aftermath ==
Bussy-Rabutin wrote in his memoirs: Pour le Maréchal de Turenne, il fit une action de grand Capitaine : car sans attendre les troupes du Maréchal d'Hocquincourt, il osa se présenter en bataille devant le Prince de Condé, qui était beaucoup plus fort que lui seul, mais qui, par la contenance du Maréchal de Turenne, crut que les deux Maréchaux étaient déjà rassemblés. La hardiesse de cette action qui n'était pourtant pas téméraire, car le Maréchal de Turenne s'était posté fort avantageusement, sauva l'Etat : tout était perdu s'il eût voulu se ménager davantage.

For Turenne, it was an action of a great captain: for without waiting for the [regrouping] of the troops of Marshall d’Hocquincourt, he dared to present himself in the battle against Condé, who was much stronger than him alone, but who, due to the countenance of Turenne, believed that they [their forces] were equal in number. The hard-fought nature of this action was not reckless, for Turenne posted himself very well, saving the state: had he wished to hold back for his own sake, all would have been lost.

Napoleon critiqued both generals in The Memorial of Saint-Helena. He judged that Condé, who possessed the greater force, could have been able to force Turenne's position. As for Turenne, Napoleon believed that he took too great a risk in confronting a larger force, and one whose morale had recently been bolstered by victory (referring to the victory against d’Hocquincourt).
