= Bernard VI =

Bernard VI may refer to:

- Bernard VI, Count of Armagnac (c. 1270–1319)
- Bernard VI, Lord of Lippe (died 1415), German nobleman
- Bernard VI of Moreuil (1285–after 1350), noble of Picardy
