= Robert III Clément =

French nobleman

- Lord of Mez
- Predecessor: Aubry Clément
- Successor: Albéric Clément
- Born: c. 1120/1130
- Died: c. 1182
- Spouse: Hersende de Mez
- Issue: Albéric Clément; Henry I Clément; Hugh Clément
- Father: Robert II Clément
- Mother: Mahaut de Tourneau

Robert III Clément (c. 1120/1130 – c. 1182) was a French nobleman and courtier who served as tutor and senior Minister of State to Philip II of France. Two of his sons, Albéric and Henry I Clément, were appointed the first and third Marshals of France respectively.

== Life and career ==
Born to Robert II Clément and Mahaut de Tourneau sometime between 1120 and 1130, Robert inherited the seigneurie of Mez on his brother Aubry's death in 1148. He had accompanied Aubry to the Holy Land in 1147 as part of the Second Crusade, but returned to France after his brother's death at Constantinople in 1148. Robert then set about recovering property of the Lordship of Mez that Aubry had sold to the Ferrières Abbey in order to fund their journey, contesting the sale on the grounds that he, as the heir to the title, had never ratified it. Robert then entered the court of Louis VII of France along with his brother Giles, distinguishing himself in administration, gaining a reputation for good judgement and integrity, and becoming one of Louis's most prominent counselors towards the end of his reign. In 1178, he (alongside Giles) was one of the judges in the suit between Barthelemy of Paris and the Abbey of Saint-Germain-des-Prés.

Robert was appointed tutor to a young Philip II, with Robert of Auxerre noting in his work that he was also appointed guardian of the prince by his father Louis VII, although the exact nature of Robert's later relationship with the young monarch is not clear, with some sources putting Robert as simply one of the chiefs among Philip's ministers (alongside Giles) rather than a straightforward guardian or regent. In addition, Philip's actions even in the period immediately following his coronation show no signs of being dictated by a regent; the boy king even negotiated directly with Henry II on the matter of the French war against Philip I, Count of Flanders. Robert nevertheless exercised significant control and influence over Philip's early reign, with the king depending on Robert for day-to-day administration of the kingdom.

Robert died sometime between 1181 and 1182 Giles appears to have briefly taken over his brother's position after his death.

== Family ==
Robert had three sons with Hersende de Mez: Albéric, Henry and Hugh. While both Albéric and Henry would go on to serve at court and in the armies of the French sovereign, Hugh entered the Church, serving as abbé of St Spire de Corbeil (1190-1196), and later Dean of Notre-Dame de Paris (1200-1203).

Preceded by Aubry Clément	Lord of Mez; 1148–1181	Succeeded by Albéric Clément
