= Guincourt =

- Commune
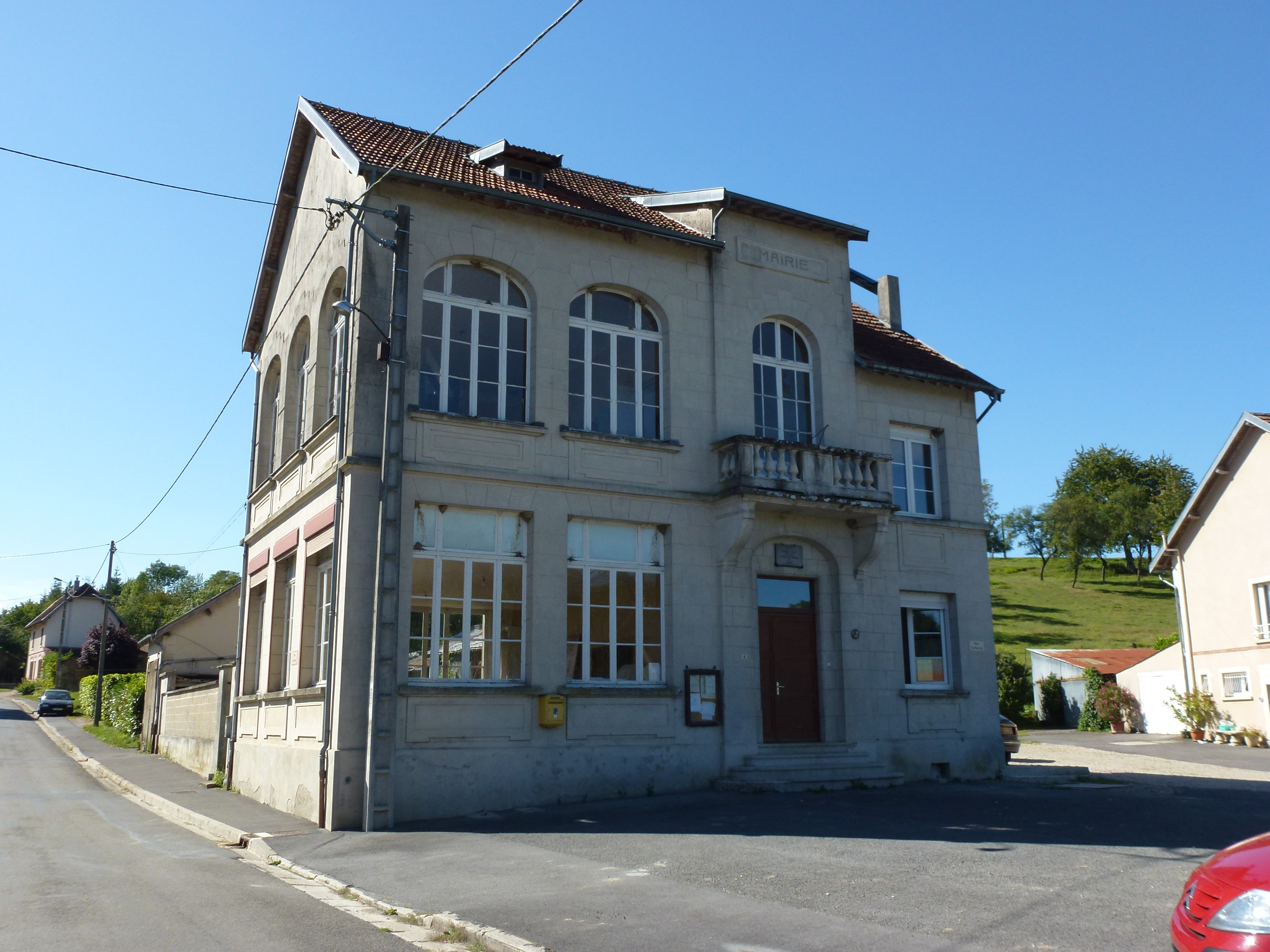
- The town hall in Guincourt
- Location of Guincourt
- Location within France Location within Grand Est
- Coordinates: 49°33′29″N 4°37′37″E
- Country: France
- Region: Grand Est
- Department: Ardennes
- Arrondissement: Vouziers
- Canton: Attigny
- Intercommunality: Crêtes Préardennaises

Government
  - Mayor (2020–2026): Dominique Pierre
- Area^{1}: 5.31 km^{2} (2.05 sq mi)
- Elevation: 149 m (489 ft)
- Population (2023): 70
  - Density: 13/km^{2} (34/sq mi)
- Time zone: UTC+01:00 (CET)
  - Summer (DST): UTC+02:00 (CEST)
- INSEE/Postal code: 08204 /08130
- Website: https://guincourt.fr/
- ^{1} French Land Register data, which excludes lakes, ponds, glaciers > 1 km^{2} (0.386 sq mi or 247 acres) and river estuaries.

Guincourt (French pronunciation: [ɡɛ̃kuʁ]) is a commune in the Ardennes department in northern France, in the former county of Vermandois. It lies just off the old road between Tourteron and Saint-Loup-Terrier.

== Population ==
Historical population
| Year | Pop. | ±% p.a. |
|---|---|---|
| 1968 | 99 | — |
| 1975 | 85 | −2.15% |
| 1982 | 77 | −1.40% |
| 1990 | 78 | +0.16% |
| 1999 | 95 | +2.21% |
| 2007 | 97 | +0.26% |
| 2012 | 96 | −0.21% |
| 2017 | 90 | −1.28% |
| 2023 | 70 | −4.10% |
Source: INSEE

== Personalities ==
Jean de Schulemberg (1597–1671), comte de Montejeux, a marshal of France, was born in the château.

== See also ==
- Communes of the Ardennes department
