= Jean de Corbeil =

French military officer

The supposed arms of Jean de Corbeil.

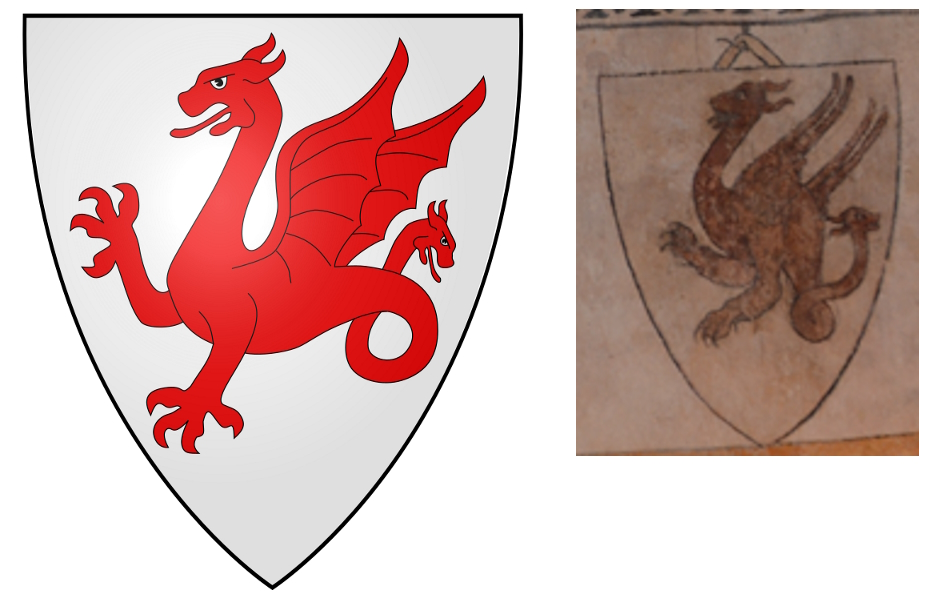
The real blason of Jean de Corbeil

Jean de Corbeil (died November 1318), Seigneur of Grez-sur-Loing, was a Marshal of France.

He was the son of Jean de Corbeil, lord of Grez-sur-Loing, and grandson of Bishop Guillaume de Grez, count of Beauvais and a Peer of France. In 1308 de Corbeil was appointed Marshal of France by Philip IV and was sent to Flanders. In May 1313 he was among the lords appointed by Louis X to negotiate peace with Louis I, Count of Nevers. He served in Flanders in 1318 under Louis, Count of Évreux and died at the end of that year.
