= Rogues de Hangest =

French noble

Rogues de Hangest († 1352), was the lord of Hangest-en-Santerre and Davenescourt. He was also the Marshal of France from 1344 to 1352.

== Biography ==
Rogues were the lord of 2 towns when his father, John III of Hangest, died in 1328.

=== Family ===
Son of John III of Hangest, he married a woman in his court named, Isabeau de Montmorency. She later died and Rogues married Alix de Garland. He had 1 son with Alix, John IV, and he soon grew up to become an adviser to the Dauphin of Vienna.

=== Military career ===
Rogues took part in the war against France in 1337, He also accompanied Philip VI of Valois in the Siege of Tournai in 1340. He was at the camp of Bouvines near Tournai, when Edward III, King of England, provoked Philip VI in singular combat.

He was appointed the king's bread maker in 1344 and the dignity of Marshal of France.

=== Death ===
Rogues died of Natural Causes in 1352.

== Coat of Arms ==
Figure
Blazon

Argent cross Gules charged with five escallops or.

== See also ==
- Hangest Family
