= Jean de Schulemberg =

Jean III de Schulemberg, comte de Montejeu
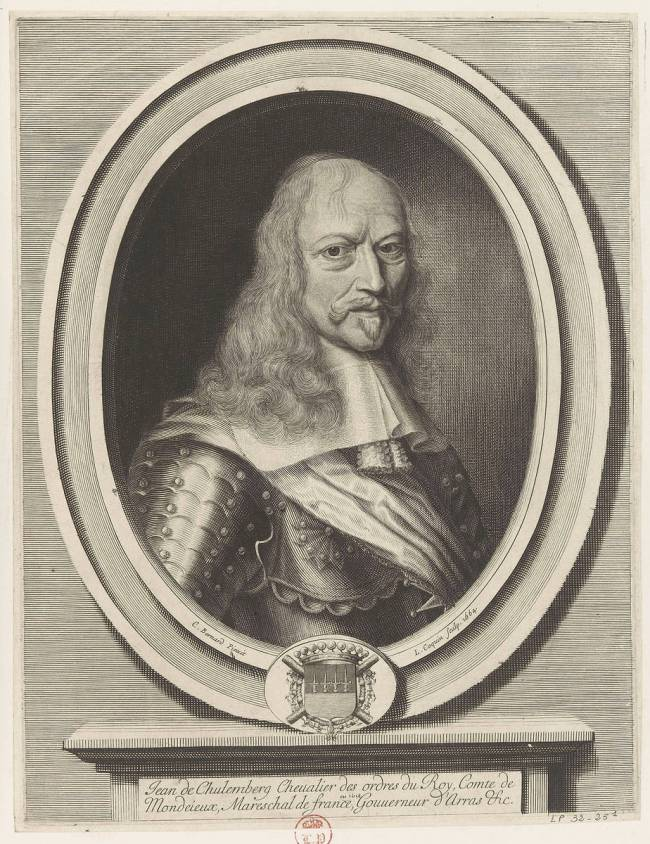
- Jean de Schulemberg
- Born: ca 1597/98; Château de Guincourt
- Died: 25 March 1671; Montejeu, Attigny
- Spouse: Madeleine de Roure
- Children: None
- Relatives: Henri de La Tour d'Auvergne (Prince he served)
- Military career
- Rank: Marshal of France
- Conflicts: Siege of Vercelli; Battle of Prague; Sieges of Saint-Jean d'Angely and Montauban; Siege of Coblenz; Defense of Arras
- Awards: Chevalier du Saint-Esprit
- Other work: Governor of Arras

Jean III de Schulemberg, comte de Montejeu[x] (ca 1597/98 – 25 March 1671), of distant Prussian origin, was born at the château de Guincourt, son of Jean, seigneur de Montejeu and his wife Anne, daughter of Jean d'Averhoult, seigneur de La Lobe.

== Life ==
He attended a course of studies at the Academy of Sedan, but at the age of sixteen served as cornet (standard-bearer) to the Protestant Henri de La Tour d'Auvergne, sovereign prince of Sedan, whom he followed at the siege of Vercelli in Piedmont (1614), and then at the battle of Prague, 8 November 1620. In 1621 he proclaimed himself a Roman Catholic though still serving under Henri de La Tour d'Auvergne. With the formal outbreak of hostilities in the Thirty Years' War, he participated at the sieges of Saint-Jean d'Angely and Montauban, then commanded troops repelling the siege of Coblenz; he fought under the maréchal de La Force, commanded troops in Berry and in Artois, was made a field marshal (1639), a lieutenant-general (1650), and then, called from Coblenz to be governor of Arras, made a name for himself at the defense of Arras (1654), facing down and counterattacking the prince de Condé, at the head of Spanish troops; the Great Condé was forced to retire, 25 August. In consequence of this success he was made marquis de Montejeu and a Marshal of France, 16 June 1658. He was made a Chevalier du Saint-Esprit, 31 December 1661. He died in 1671 at his château of Montejeu, Attigny.

He married Madeleine de Roure, daughter of the seigneur de Basancourt; she died in 1674. They left no children.

== Sources ==
A brief biographical sketch was published by Suzanne Renée Briet, "Un Maréchal de France inconnu : Jean de Schulemberg, comte de Mont-de-Jeux (1598–1671)", Les cahiers d’études ardennais 4 (1959:38–40) Mezières: Editions de la Société d'Études Ardennaises, Archives departmentales; it was expanded in book form as Le maréchal de Schulemberg (Mezières: Editions de la Société d'Études Ardennaises) 1960.
