= Bernard VI of Moreuil =

Noble of Picard, Marshal of France

Coat of arms of Moreuil

Bernard de Moreuil (born 1285; died after 22 May 1350) was a noble of Picardy, the lord of Moreuil and Cœuvres, and Marshal of France.

== Biography ==
Bernard VI of Moreuil took part in the campaign of Flanders in 1314 under the orders of Guy IV of Châtillon, count of Saint-Pol. He was sent, as commissioner, for the reformation of the kingdom, to the bailiwicks of Senlis, Chartres and Paris.

Named Marshal of France in 1322, he was sent to the borders of Calais and Boulogne, in 1344.

King Philip VI of Valois made him his lieutenant after the Battle of Crecy, in which his brother Thibaut de Moreuil died, and sent him to defend Boulogne-Sur-Mer against the English.

Bernard VI de Moreuil was also appointed governor of the son of the King of France, the future John the Good. He was also made grand queux de France, having the charge of directing the kitchens of the court and the cuisines de la cour.

Bernard de Moreuil died around 1350.
