= Marshal of France =

French military title

Marshal of France Maréchal de France
- Rank flag

- Shoulder and sleeve insignia
- Country: France
- Service branch: French Army
- Rank group: General officer
- NATO rank code: OF-10
- Formation: 1185
- Next lower rank: Army general (Note: A military rank.)
- Equivalent ranks: Admiral of France

Related articles
- History: Marshal of the Empire

Marshal of France (French: Maréchal de France, plural Maréchaux de France) is a French military distinction, rather than a military rank, which is awarded to generals for exceptional achievements.

The title has been awarded since 1185, though briefly abolished (1793–1804) and for a period dormant (1870–1916). It was one of the Great Officers of the Crown of France during the ancien régime and Bourbon Restoration, and one of the Grand Dignitaries of the Empire during the First French Empire (when the title was Marshal of the Empire, not Marshal of France).

Between the end of the 16th century and the middle of the 19th century, six Marshals of France were given the even more exalted rank of Marshal General of France: Biron, Lesdiguières, Turenne, Villars, Saxe, and Soult. The last Marshal of France to be elevated to date is Marie-Pierre Kœnig in 1984, posthumously.

The distinction of Admiral of France is the equivalent in the French Navy.

== History ==
The title derived from the office of marescallus Franciae created by King Philip II Augustus for Albéric Clément about 1190.

The title was abolished by the National Convention in 1793. It was restored as Marshal of the Empire during the First Empire by Napoleon. Under the Bourbon Restoration, the title reverted to Marshal of France, and Napoleon III kept that designation.

After the fall of Napoleon III and the Second French Empire, the Third Republic did not use the title until the First World War, when it was recreated as a military distinction and not a rank.

As with any official position, the distinction of Marshal of France is awarded by executive decree, but usually after a special law voted by the French Parliament.

The last living Marshal of France was Alphonse Juin, promoted in 1952, who died in 1967. The latest Marshal of France was Marie-Pierre Kœnig, who was made a Marshal posthumously in 1984. Today, the title of Marshal of France can only be granted to a general officer who fought victoriously in war-time.

== Insignia and symbols ==
A Marshal of France wears insignia consisting of seven stars on each shoulder strap. As a symbol of their rank, marshals are also presented with a ceremonial baton, a blue cylinder adorned with stars that historically featured fleurs-de-lis under the monarchy and eagles during the First French Empire. The baton bears the Latin motto Terror belli, decus pacis, meaning "terror in war, ornament in peace".

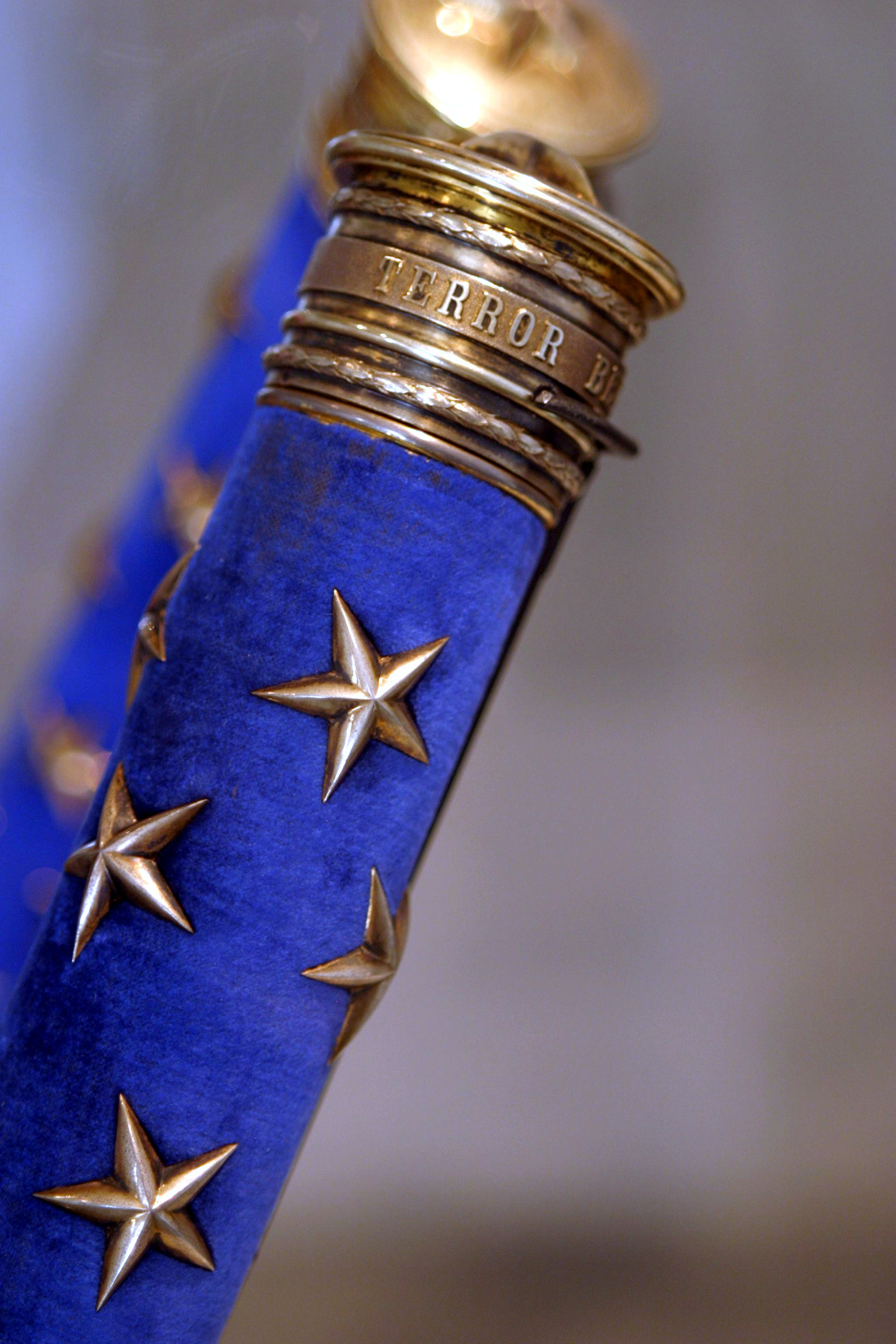
Terror belli...

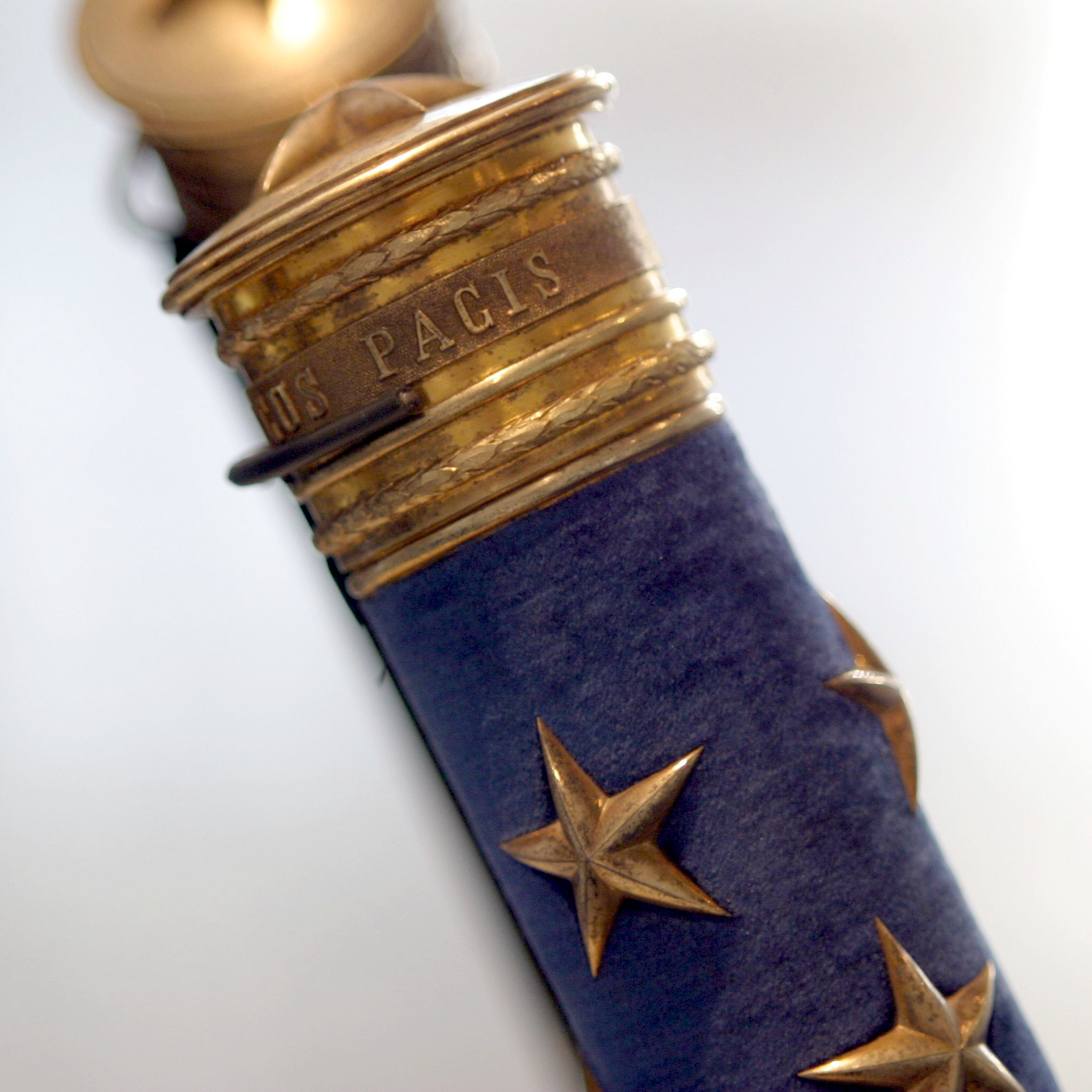
...decus pacis

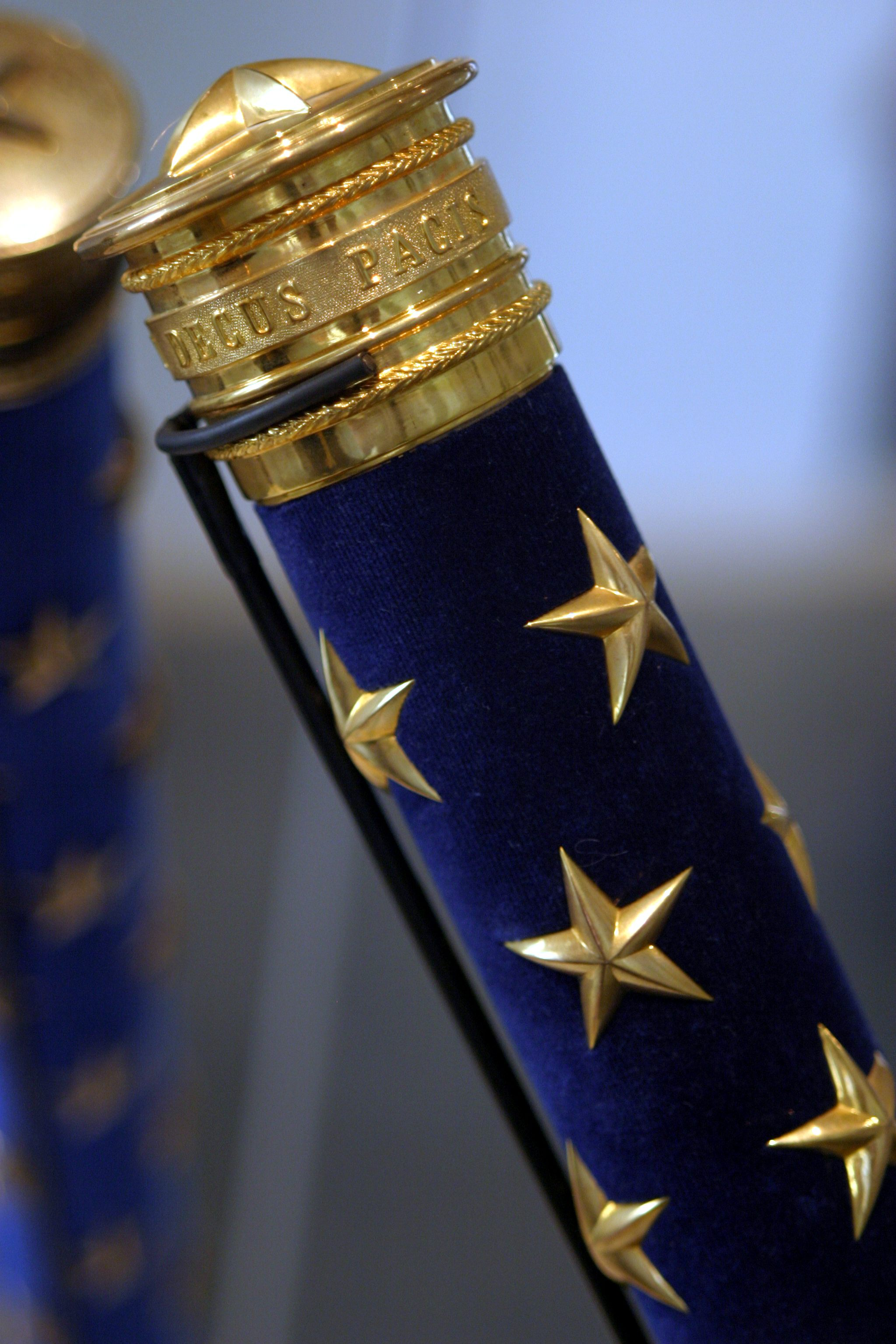
Modern-day baton, belonging to one of the four Marshals of France appointed after World War II (Leclerc, de Lattre, Juin, and Kœnig)

== Direct Capetians ==
=== Philip II, 1180–1223 ===
- Albéric Clément, Lord of Le Mez (died 1191), Marshal of France in 1185
- Matthew II of Montmorency, Lord of Montmorency and Marly, Marshal of France in 1191
- Guillaume de Bournel (died 1195), Marshal of France in 1192
- Nivelon d'Arras (died 1204), Marshal of France in 1202
- Henry I Clément, called the "Little Marshal", Lord of Le Mez and of Argentan (1170–1214), Marshal of France in 1204
- Jean III Clément, Lord of Le Mez and of Argentan (died 1262), Marshal of France in 1214
- Guillaume de la Tournelle (dates unknown), Marshal of France in 1220

=== Louis IX, 1226–1270 ===
- Ferry Pasté, Lord of Challeranges (died 1247), Marshal of France in 1240
- Jean Guillaume de Beaumont (died 1257), Marshal of France in 1250
- Henri de Cousances (died 1268), Marshal of France in 1255
- Gauthier III, Lord of Nemours (died 1270), Marshal of France in 1257
- Henri II Clément, Lord of Le Mez and Argentan (died 1265), Marshal of France in 1262
- Héric de Beaujeu (died 1270), Marshal of France in 1265
- Renaud de Précigny (died 1270), Marshal of France in 1265
- Hugh of Mirepoix, Marshal of France in 1266
- Raoul II Sores (died 1282), Marshal of France in 1270
- Lancelot de Saint-Maard (died 1278), Marshal of France in 1270

=== Philip III, 1270–1285 ===
- Ferry de Verneuil (died 1283), Marshal of France in 1272
- Guillaume V du Bec Crespin (died 1283), Marshal of France in 1283
- Jean II d'Harcourt, Viscount of Châtellerault, Lord of Harcourt (died 1302), Marshal of France in 1283
- Raoul V Le Flamenc (died 1287), Marshal of France in 1285

=== Philip IV, 1285–1314 ===
- Jean de Varennes (died 1292), Marshal of France in 1288
- Simon de Melun, Lord of La Loupe and of Marcheville (died 1302), Marshal of France in 1290
- Guy Ier de Clermont de Nesle (died 1302), Marshal of France in 1292
- Foulques du Merle (died 1314), Marshal of France in 1302
- Miles VI de Noyers (died 1350), Marshal of France in 1302
- Jean de Corbeil, Lord of Grez (died 1318), Marshal of France in 1308

=== Louis X, 1314–1316 ===
- Jean IV de Beaumont (died 1318), Marshal of France in 1315

=== Philip V, 1316–1322 ===
- Mathieu de Trie (died 1344), Marshal of France in 1318
- Jean des Barres (dates unknown), Marshal of France in 1318
- Bernard VI de Moreuil, Lord of Moreuil (died 1350), Marshal of France in 1322

=== Charles IV, 1322–1328 ===
- Robert-Jean Bertran de Briquebec, Baron of Briquebec, Viscount of Roncheville (1285–1348), Marshal of France in 1325

== Valois ==
=== Philip VI, 1328–1350 ===
- Anseau de Joinville (1265–1343), Marshal of France in 1339
- Charles I de Montmorency, Lord of Montmorency (1325–1381), Marshal of France in 1344
- Robert de Waurin, Lord of Saint-Venant (died 1360), Marshal of France in 1344
- Guy II de Nesle, Lord of Offémont and of Mello (died 1352), Marshal of France in 1345
- Édouard I de Beaujeu, Lord of Châteauneuf (1316–1351), Marshal of France in 1347

=== Jean II 1350–1364 ===
- Arnoul d'Audrehem, Lord of Audrehem (died 1370), Marshal of France in 1351
- Rogues de Hangest, Lord of Avesnecourt (died 1352), Marshal of France in 1352
- Jean de Clermont, Lord of Chantilly and of Beaumont (died 1356), Marshal of France in 1352
- Jean I Le Maingre (1310–1367), Marshal of France in 1356

=== Charles V, 1364–1380 ===
- Jean IV de Mauquenchy, Lord of Blainville (died 1391), Marshal of France in 1368
- Louis de Sancerre, Count of Sancerre (1342–1402), Marshal of France in 1369

=== Charles VI, 1380–1422 ===
- Jean II Le Meingre (1364–1421), Marshal of France in 1391
- Jean II de Rieux, Lord of Rochefort and of Rieux (1342–1417), Marshal of France in 1397
- Pierre de Rieux, Lord of Rochefort and of Rieux (1389–1439), Marshal of France in 1417
- Claude de Beauvoir, Lord of Chastellux and Viscount of Avallon (1385–1453), Marshal of France in 1418
- Jean de Villiers de L'Isle-Adam (1384–1437), Marshal of France in 1418
- Jacques de Montberon, Lord of Engoumois (died 1422), Marshal of France in 1418
- Gilbert Motier de La Fayette (1396–1464), Marshal of France in 1421
- Antoine de Vergy (died 1439), Marshal of France in 1422
- Jean de La Baume, Count of Montrevel-en-Bresse (died 1435), Marshal of France in 1422

=== Charles VII, 1422–1461 ===
- Amaury de Séverac, Lord of Beaucaire and of Chaude-Aigues (died 1427), Marshal of France in 1424
- Jean de Brosse, Baron of Boussac and of Sainte-Sévère (1375–1433), Marshal of France in 1426
- Gilles de Rais, Lord of Ingrande and of Champtocé (c. 1405 – 1440), Marshal of France in 1429
- André de Laval-Montmorency, Lord of Lohéac and of Retz (1408–1486), Marshal of France in 1439
- Philippe de Culant, Lord of Jaloignes, of La Croisette, of Saint-Armand and of Chalais (died 1454), Marshal of France in 1441
- Jean Poton de Xaintrailles, Seneschal de Limousin (1390–1461), Marshal of France in 1454

=== Louis XI, 1461–1483 ===
- Joachim Rouhault de Gamaches, Lord of Boismenard (died 1478), Marshal of France in 1461
- Jean de Lescun, Count of Comminges (died 1473), Marshal of France in 1461
- Wolfart VI Van Borselleen, Lord of Veere in Zeeland and Earl of Buchan in Scotland (died 1487), Marshal of France in 1464
- Pierre de Rohan de Gié, Lord of Rohan (1450–1514), Marshal of France in 1476

=== Charles VIII, 1483–1498 ===
- Philippe de Crèvecœur d'Esquerdes (1418–1494), Marshal of France in 1486
- Jean de Baudricourt, Lord of Choiseul and Bailiff of Chaumont (died 1499), Marshal of France in 1486

== Valois-Orléans ==
=== Louis XII, 1498–1515 ===
- Gian Giacomo Trivulzio, Marquis of Vigevano (1448–1518), Marshal of France in 1499
- Charles II d'Amboise, Lord of Chaumont, of Meillan and of Charenton (1473–1511), Marshal of France in 1506
- Odet de Foix, Vicomte de Lautrec, Viscount of Lautrec (1485–1528), Marshal of France in 1511
- Robert Stewart, Lord of Aubigny, Count of Lennox (1470–1544), Marshal of France in 1514

== Valois-Angoulême ==
=== Francis I 1515–1547 ===
- Jacques II de Chabannes, Lord of La Palice (died 1525), Marshal of France in 1515
- Gaspard I de Coligny, Lord of Châtillon-sur-Loing (died 1522), Marshal of France in 1516
- Thomas de Foix-Lescun (died 1525), Marshal of France in 1518
- Anne de Montmorency, Duke of Montmorency and Baron of Damville, Count of Beaumont-sur-Oise and of Dammartin, Viscount of Melun, first Baron of France and Grand Master, Constable of France etc. (1492–1567), Marshal of France in 1522
- Théodor Trivulce (1458–1531), Marshal of France in 1526
- Robert III de La Marck, Duke of Bouillon, Lord of Sedan (1491–1537), Marshal of France in 1526
- Claude d'Annebaut (1500–1552), Marshal of France in 1538
- René de Montjean (died 1538), Lord of Montjean, Marshal of France in 1538
- Oudard du Biez, Seigneur of Le Biez (died 1553), Marshal of France in 1542
- Antoine de Lettes-Desprez, Lord of Montpezat (1490–1544), Marshal of France in 1544
- Jean Caraccioli, Prince of Melphes (1480–1550), Marshal of France in 1544

=== Henry II 1547–1559 ===
- Jacques d'Albon de Saint-André, Marquis of Fronsac (died 1562), Marshal of France 1547
- Robert IV de La Marck, Duke of Bouillon and Prince of Sedan (1520–1556), Marshal of France in 1547
- Charles de Cossé, Count of Brissac (1505–1563), Marshal of France in 1550
- Pietro Strozzi (1500–1558), Marshal of France in 1554
- Paul de La Barthe, Lord of Thermes (1482–1562), Marshal of France in 1558

=== Francis II 1559–1560 ===
- François de Montmorency, Duke of Montmorency (1530–1579), Marshal of France in 1559

=== Charles IX, 1560–1574 ===
- François de Scépeaux, Lord of Vieilleville (1509–1571), Marshal of France in 1562
- Imbert de La Plâtière, Lord of Bourdillon (1524–1567), Marshal of France in 1562
- Henri I de Montmorency, Lord of Damville, Duke of Montmorency, Count of Dammartin and Alais, Baron of Chateaubriant, Lord of Chantilly and Ecouen (1534–1614), Marshal of France in 1566
- Artus de Cossé-Brissac, Lord of Gonnor and Count of Secondigny (1512–1582), Marshal of France in 1567
- Gaspard de Saulx, Lord of Tavannes (1509–1575), Marshal of France in 1570
- Honorat II de Savoye, Marquis of Villars (1511–1580), Marshal of France in 1571
- Albert de Gondi, Duke of Retz (1522–1602), Marshal of France in 1573

=== Henry III 1574–1589 ===
- Roger I de Saint-Lary, Lord of Bellegarde (died 1579), Marshal of France in 1574
- Blaise de Lasseran-Massencôme, Seigneur de Montluc (1500–1577), Marshal of France in 1574
- Louis Prévost de Sansac, Baron de Sansac (1496–1576), Marshal of France
- Armand de Gontaut, Baron de Biron (1524–1592), Marshal of France in 1577
- Jacques II de Goyon, Lord of Matignon and of Lesparre, Count of Thorigny, Prince of Mortagne sur Gironde (1525–1597), Marshal of France in 1579
- Jean VI d'Aumont, Baron of Estrabonne, Count of Châteauroux (1522–1595), Marshal of France
- Guillaume de Joyeuse, Viscount of Joyeuse, Lord of Saint-Didier, of Laudun, of Puyvert and of Arques (1520–1592), Marshal of France in 1582

== Bourbons ==
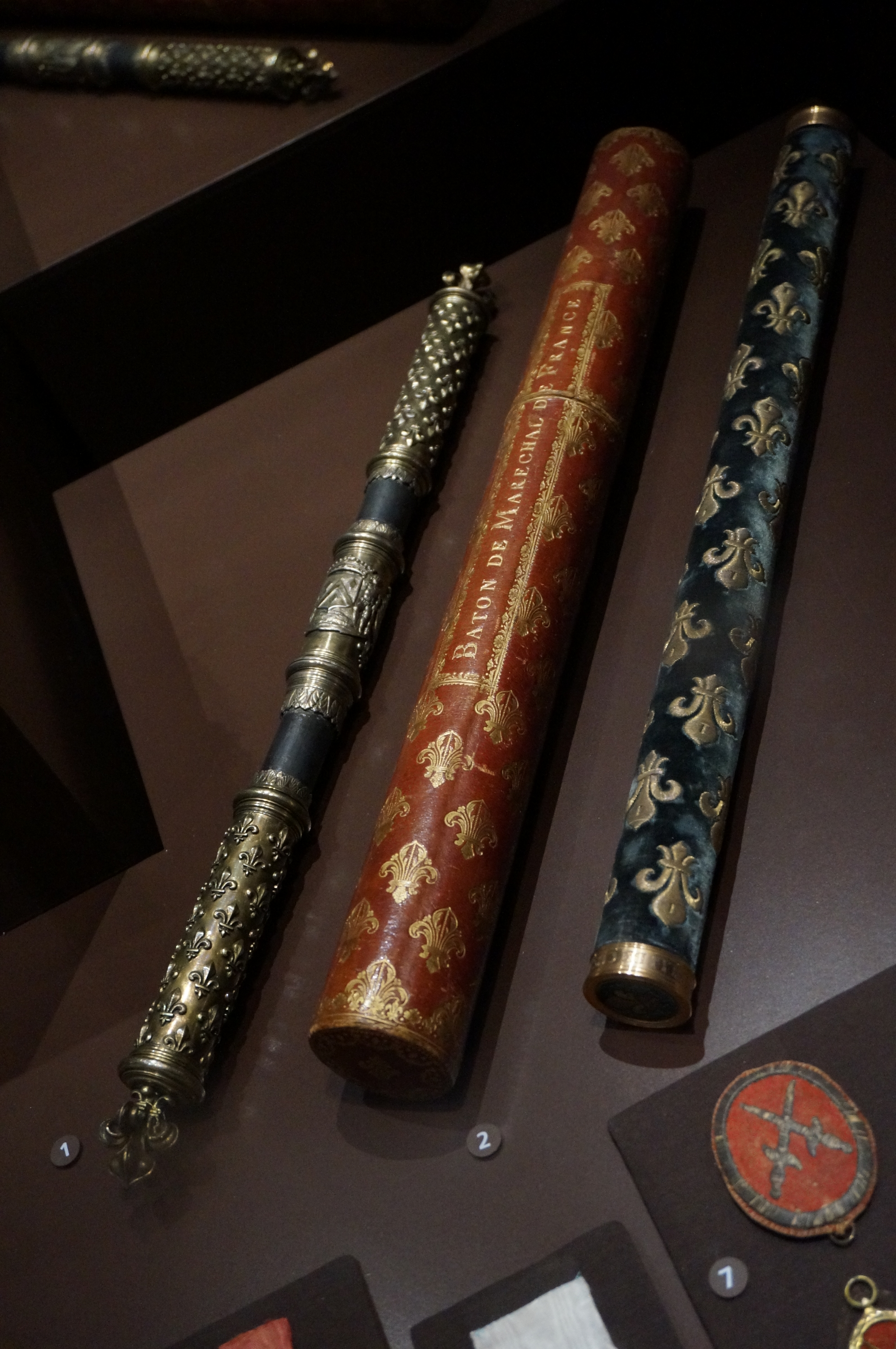
Pre-revolutionary marshals' batons in the Musée de l'Armée

=== Henry IV 1589–1610 ===
- Henri de La Tour d'Auvergne, Vicomte de Turenne, Duc de Bouillon (1555–1623), Marshal of France in 1592
- Charles de Gontaut, Duc de Biron (1562–1602), Marshal of France in 1594
- Claude de La Châtre (1536–1614), Marshal of France in 1594
- Jean de Montluc de Balagny (1560–1603), Marshal of France in 1594
- Charles II de Cossé, Duke of Brissac (1562–1621), Marshal of France in 1594
- Jean III de Baumanoir, Marquis of Lavardin and Count of Nègrepelisse (1551–1614), Marshal of France in 1595
- Henri, Duke of Joyeuse (1567–1608), Marshal of France in 1595
- Urbain de Montmorency-Laval, Marquis of Sablé (1557–1629), Marshal of France in 1595
- Alphonse d'Ornano (1548–1610), Marshal of France in 1597
- Guillaume de Hautemer, Count of Grancey (1537–1613), Marshal of France in 1597
- François de Bonne, Duke of Lesdiguières (1543–1626), Marshal of France in 1608

=== Louis XIII, 1610–1643 ===
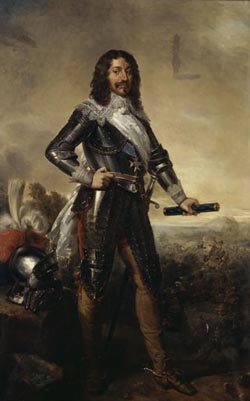
Charles de Schomberg

- Concino Concini, Marquis of Ancre (1575–1617), Marshal of France in 1613
- Gilles de Courtenvaux, Marquis of Souvré (1540–1626), Marshal of France in 1614
- Antoine, Baron de Roquelaure (1560–1625), Marshal of France in 1614
- Louis de La Châtre, Baron de Maisonfort (died 1630), Marshal of France in 1616
- Pons de Lauzières-Thémines-Cardaillac, Marquis of Thémines (1553–1627), Marshal of France in 1616
- François de La Grange d'Arquian, Lord of Montigny and of Séry in Bérry (1554–1617), Marshal of France in 1616
- Nicolas de L'Hôpital, Duke of Vitry (1581–1644), Marshal of France in 1617
- Charles de Choiseul-Praslin, Marquis of Praslin (1563–1626), Marshal of France in 1619
- Jean-François de La Guiche, Count of La Palice (1569–1632), Marshal of France in 1619
- Honoré d'Albert d'Ailly, Duke of Chaulnes (1581–1649), Marshal of France in 1620
- François d'Esparbes de Lussan, Viscount of Aubeterre (c. 1571–1628), Marshal of France in 1620
- Charles de Créquy, Prince of Poix, Duke of Lesdiguières (1580–1638), Marshal of France in 1621
- Jacques Nompar de Caumont, Duke of La Force (1558–1652), Marshal of France in 1621
- François, Marquis of Bassompierre (1579–1646), Marshal of France in 1622
- Gaspard de Coligny, Duke of Châtillon (1584–1646), Marshal of France in 1622
- Henri de Schomberg (1574–1632), Marshal of France in 1625
- Jean-Baptiste d'Ornano (1581–1626), Marshal of France in 1626
- François Annibal, Duc d'Estrées (1573–1670), Marshal of France in 1626
- Timoléon d'Epinay de Saint-Luc (1580–1644), Marshal of France in 1627
- Louis de Marillac, Count of Beaumont-le-Roger (1572–1632), Marshal of France in 1629
- Henri II, Duke of Montmorency and of Damville, also Admiral of France (1595–1632), Marshal of France in 1630
- Jean Caylar d'Anduze de Saint-Bonnet, Marquis of Toiras (1585–1636), Marshal of France in 1630
- Antoine Coëffier de Ruzé d'Effiat (1581–1632), Marshal of France in 1631
- Urbain de Maillé, Marquis of Brézé (1597–1650), Marshal of France in 1633
- Maximilien de Béthune, Duke of Sully (1560–1641), Marshal of France in 1634
- Charles de Schomberg, Duke of Halluin (1601–1656), Marshal of France in 1637
- Charles de La Porte, Marquis of Meilleraye (1602–1664), Marshal of France in 1639
- Antoine III, Duke of Gramont (1604–1678), Marshal of France in 1641
- Jean-Baptiste Budes, Count of Guébriant (1602–1643), Marshal of France in 1642
- Philippe de La Mothe-Houdancourt, Duke of Cardona (1605–1657), Marshal of France in 1642
- François de L'Hôpital, Count of Rosnay (1583–1660), Marshal of France in 1643
- Henri de la Tour d'Auvergne, Vicomte de Turenne (1611–1675), Marshal of France in 1643, Marshal General of France in 1660
- Jean, Count of Gassion (1609–1647), Marshal of France in 1643

=== Louis XIV, 1643–1715 ===
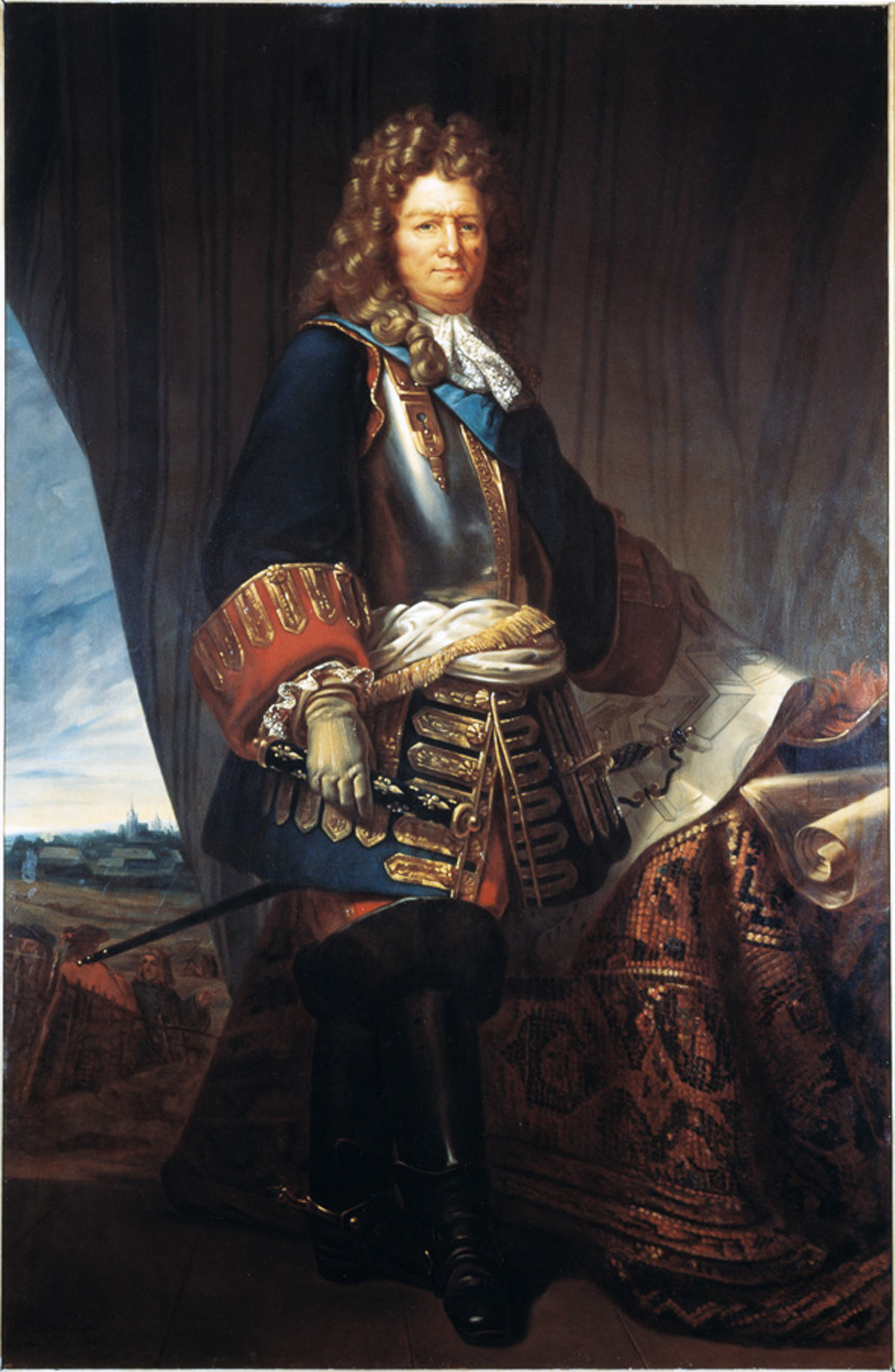
Sébastien de Vauban

- César, Duke of Choiseul (1598–1675), Marshal of France in 1645
- Josias, Count of Rantzau (1609–1650), Marshal of France in 1645
- Nicolas de Neufville, Duke of Villeroi (1597–1685), Marshal of France in 1646
- Antoine d'Aumont de Rochebaron, Duc d'Aumont (1601–1669), Marshal of France in 1651
- Jacques d'Étampes, Marquis of la Ferté-Imbault (1590–1663), Marshal of France in 1651
- Henri, Duke of la Ferté-Senneterre (1600–1681), Marshal of France in 1651
- Charles de Monchy, Marquis d'Hocquincourt (1599–1658), Marshal of France in 1651
- Jacques Rouxel, Count of Grancey (1603–1680), Marshal of France in 1651
- Armand Nompar de Caumont, Duke of La Force (1582–1672), Marshal of France in 1652
- Philippe de Clérambault, Count of Palluau (1606–1665), Marshal of France in 1652
- César Phoebus d'Albret, Count of Miossens (1614–1676), Marshal of France in 1653
- Louis de Foucault de Saint-Germain Beaupré Count of Le Daugnon (1616–1659), Marshal of France in 1653
- Jean de Schulemberg, Count of Montejeu (1597–1671), Marshal of France in 1658
- Abraham de Fabert, Marquis of Esternay (1599–1662), Marshal of France in 1658
- Jacques de Mauvisière, Marquis of Castelnau (1620–1658), Marshal of France in 1658
- Bernardin Gigault, Marquis of Bellefonds (1630–1694), Marshal of France in 1668
- François de Créquy, Marquis of Marines (1620–1687), Marshal of France in 1668
- Louis de Crevant, Duke of Humières (1628–1694), Marshal of France in 1668
- Godefroy d'Estrades, Count of Estrades (1607–1686), Marshal of France in 1675
- Philippe de Montaut-Bénac, Duke of Navailles (1619–1684), Marshal of France in 1675
- Frédéric Armand, Duke of Schomberg (1616–1690), Marshal of France in 1675
- Jacques Henri de Durfort, Duke of Duras (1626–1704), Marshal of France in 1675
- François d'Aubusson, Duke of la Feuillade (1625–1691), Marshal of France in 1675
- Louis Victor de Rochechouart, Duke of Mortemart le Maréchal de Vivonne (1636–1688), Marshal of France in 1675
- François-Henri de Montmorency, duc de Luxembourg (1628–1695), Marshal of France in 1675
- Henri Louis d'Aloigny, Marquis of Rochefort (1636–1676), Marshal of France in 1675
- Guy de Durfort, Duke of Lorges (1630–1702), Marshal of France in 1676
- Jean II, Count of Estrées 1624–1707), Marshal of France in 1681
- Claude de Choiseul, Marquis of Francières (1632–1711), Marshal of France in 1693
- Jean Armand de Joyeuse, Marquis of Grandpré (1632–1710), Marshal of France in 1693
- François de Neufville, Duke of Villeroi (1644–1730), Marshal of France in 1693
- Louis François, duc de Boufflers, comte de Cagny (1644–1711), Marshal of France in 1693
- Anne-Hilarion de Costentin, Count of Tourville (1642–1701), Marshal of France in 1693
- Anne-Jules, 2nd duc de Noailles (1650–1708), Marshal of France in 1693
- Nicolas Catinat (1637–1712), Marshal of France in 1693
- Louis Joseph de Bourbon, duc de Vendôme (1654–1712), Marshal of France in 1695
- Claude Louis Hector, Duke of Villars (1653–1734), Marshal of France in 1702, Marshal General of France in 1733
- Noël Bouton, Marquis of Chamilly (1636–1715), Marshal of France in 1703
- Victor Marie, Duc d'Estrées (1660–1737), Marshal of France in 1703
- François Louis Rousselet, Marquis of Château-Renault (1637–1716), Marshal of France in 1703
- Sébastien Le Prestre, Marquis of Vauban (1633–1707), Marshal of France in 1703
- Conrad, Marquis of Rosen (1628–1715), Marshal of France in 1703
- Nicolas Chalon du Blé, Marquis of Huxelles (1652–1730), Marshal of France in 1703
- René de Froulay, Count of Tessé (1651–1725), Marshal of France in 1703
- Camille d'Hostun, duc de Tallard (1652–1728), Marshal of France in 1703
- Nicolas Auguste de La Baume, Marquis of Montrevel (1636–1716), Marshal of France in 1703
- Henry, duc d'Harcourt (1654–1718), Marshal of France in 1703
- Ferdinand, Count of Marsin (1656–1706), Marshal of France in 1703
- James FitzJames, 1st Duke of Berwick (1670–1734), Marshal of France in 1706
- Charles Auguste Goyon, Count of Matignon (1647–1729), Marshal of France in 1708
- Jacques de Bazin, Marquis of Bezons (1645–1733), Marshal of France in 1709
- Pierre de Montesquiou, Count of Artagnan (1645–1725), Marshal of France in 1709 N.B.: not the famous D'Artagnan, but a relative

=== Louis XV, 1715–1774 ===
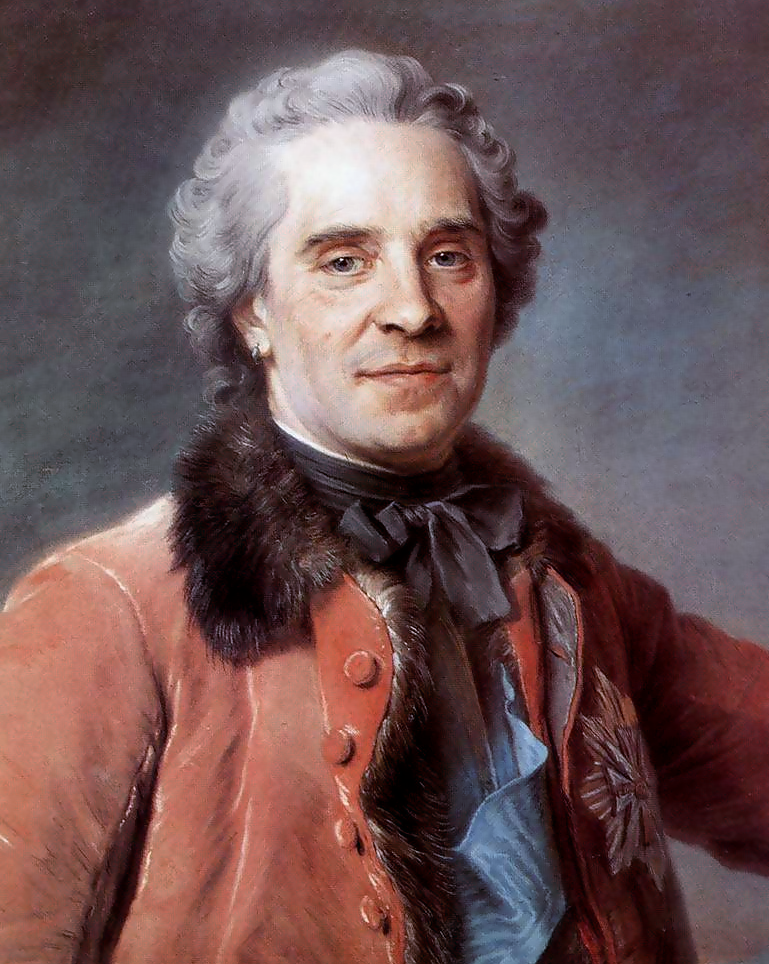
Maurice de Saxe

- Victor-Maurice, comte de Broglie (1646–1727), Marshal of France in 1724
- Antoine Gaston Jean Baptiste, Duke of Roquelaure (1656–1738), Marshal of France in 1724
- Jacques Rouxel, Count of Grancey and of Médavy (1655–1725), Marshal of France in 1724
- Éléonor du Maine, Count of Le Bourg (1655–1739), Marshal of France in 1724
- Yves, marquis d'Alègre (1653–1733), Marshal of France in 1724
- Louis d'Aubusson, Duke of la Feuillade (1673–1725), Marshal of France in 1724
- Antoine V, Duke of Gramont (1671–1725), Marshal of France in 1724
- Alain Emmanuel, Marquis of Coëtlogon (1646–1730), Marshal of France in 1730
- Charles de Gontaut, Duke of Biron (1663–1756), Marshal of France in 1734
- Jacques de Chastenet, Marquis of Puységur (1665–1743), Marshal of France in 1734
- Claude Bidal, Marquis of Asfeld (1665–1743), Marshal of France in 1734
- Adrien-Maurice, 3rd duc de Noailles (1678–1766), Marshal of France in 1734
- Christian Louis de Montmorency-Luxembourg, Prince de Tingry (1713–1787), Marshal of France in 1734
- François Marie II, Duke of Broglie (1671–1745), Marshal of France in 1734
- François de Franquetot, Duke of Coigny (1670–1759), Marshal of France in 1734
- Charles, Duke of Lévis-Charlus (1669–1734), Marshal of France in 1734
- Louis de Brancas de Forcalquier, Marquis of Céreste (1671–1750), Marshal of France in 1740
- Louis Auguste d'Albert d'Ailly, Duke of Chaulnes (1676–1744), Marshal of France in 1741
- Louis Armand de Brichanteau, Duke of Nangis (1682–1742), Marshal of France in 1741
- Louis de Gand de Mérode de Montmorency, prince d'Isenghien (1678–1762), Marshal of France in 1741
- Jean-Baptiste de Durfort, Duke of Duras (1684–1778), Marshal of France in 1741
- Jean-Baptiste Desmarets, Marquis of Maillebois (1682–1762), Marshal of France in 1741
- Charles Fouquet, Duke of Belle-Isle, called the Marshal of Belle-Isle (1684–1762), Marshal of France in 1741
- Maurice, comte de Saxe (1696–1750), Marshal of France in 1741, Marshal General of France in 1747
- Jean-Baptiste Andrault, Marquis of Maulévrier (1677–1754), Marshal of France in 1745
- Claude Testu, Marquis of Balincourt (1680–1770), Marshal of France in 1746
- Philippe Charles, Marquis of la Fare (1687–1752), Marshal of France in 1746
- François, duc d'Harcourt (1689–1750), Marshal of France in 1746
- Guy, Count of Montmorency-Laval (1677–1751), Marshal of France in 1747
- Gaspard, Duke of Clermont-Tonnerre 1688–1781, Marshal of France in 1747
- Louis Charles, Marquis of La Mothe-Houdancourt (1687–1755), Marshal of France in 1747
- Ulrich, Count of Löwendahl (1700–1755), Marshal of France in 1747
- Louis François Armand du Plessis, duc de Richelieu (1696–1788), Marshal of France in 1748
- Jean de Fay, Marquis of la Tour-Maubourg (1684–1764), Marshal of France in 1757
- Louis Antoine de Gontaut (1701–1788), Count (afterwards Duke) of Biron, Marshal of France in 1757
- Daniel François de Gélas de Voisons d'Ambres, Viscount of Lautrec (1686–1762), Marshal of France in 1757
- Charles François Frédéric de Montmorency, Duke of Piney-Luxembourg (1702–1764), Marshal of France in 1757
- Louis Le Tellier, Duc d'Estrées (1695–1771), Marshal of France in 1757
- Jean Charles de la Ferté, Marquis of La Ferté Senneterre (1685–1770), Marshal of France in 1757
- Charles O'Brien de Thomond, Count of Thomond and of Clare (1699–1761), Marshal of France in 1757
- Gaston Pierre de Lévis, Duke of Mirepoix (1699–1758), Marshal of France in 1757
- Ladislas Ignace de Bercheny (1689–1778), Marshal of France in 1758
- Hubert de Brienne, Count of Conflans (1690–1777), Marshal of France in 1758
- Louis Georges, Marquis of Contades (1704–1793), Marshal of France in 1758
- Charles de Rohan, Prince of Soubise (1715–1787), Marshal of France in 1758
- Victor François, Duke de Broglie (1718–1804), Marshal of France in 1759
- Guy Michel de Durfort de Lorge, Duke of Randan (1704–1773), Marshal of France in 1768
- Louis de Brienne de Conflans, Marquis of Armentières (1711–1774), Marshal of France in 1768
- Jean de Cossé, Duke of Brissac (1698–1780), Marshal of France in 1768

=== Louis XVI, 1774–1792 ===
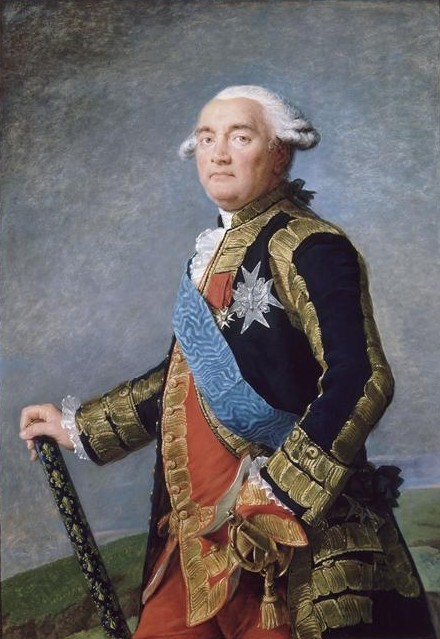
Philippe de Ségur

- Anne Pierre, Duke of Harcourt (1701–1783), Marshal of France in 1775
- Louis, 4th duc de Noailles (1713–1793), Marshal of France in 1775
- Antoine, Count of Nicolaï (1712–1787), Marshal of France in 1775
- Charles, Duke of Fitz-James (1712–1787), Marshal of France in 1775
- Philippe, Duke of Mouchy (1715–1794), Marshal of France in 1775
- Emmanuel de Durfort, Duke of Duras (1715–1789), Marshal of France in 1775
- Louis Nicolas, Duc du Muy (1702–1775), Marshal of France in 1775
- Claude, Count of Saint-Germain (1707–1778), Marshal of France in 1775
- Guy de Montmorency, Duke of Laval (1723–1798), Marshal of France in 1783
- Augustin, Count of Mailly (1708–1794), Marshal of France in 1783
- Henri Bouchard de Lussan, Marquis of Aubeterre (1714–1788), Marshal of France in 1783
- Charles de Beauvau, Prince of Beauvau-Craon (1720–1793), Marshal of France in 1783
- Noël Jourda, Count of Vaux (1705–1788), Marshal of France in 1783
- Philippe Henri, marquis de Ségur (1724–1801), Marshal of France in 1783
- Jacques de Choiseul-Stainville, Count of Choiseul (1727–1789), Marshal of France in 1783
- Charles de La Croix, Marquis of Castries (1727–1801), Marshal of France in 1783
- Emmanuel de Croÿ-Solre, Duke of Croÿ (1718–1784), Marshal of France in 1783
- François Gaston de Lévis, Duc de Lévis (1719–1787), Marshal of France in 1783
- Nicolas Luckner, Comte Luckner (1722–1794), Marshal of France since in 1791
- Jean-Baptiste Donatien de Vimeur, comte de Rochambeau (1725–1807), Marshal of France in 1791

== First Empire ==
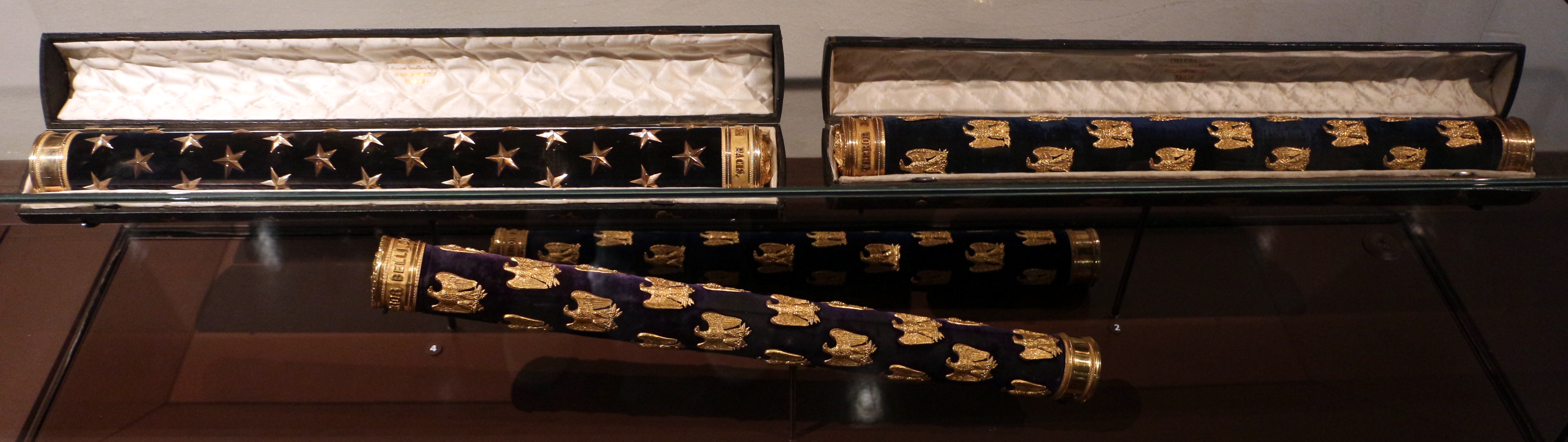
Napoleonic marshals' batons in the Musée de l'Armée

=== Napoleon I, 1804–1814, 1815 ===
Throughout his reign, Napoleon created a total of twenty-six Marshals of the Empire:

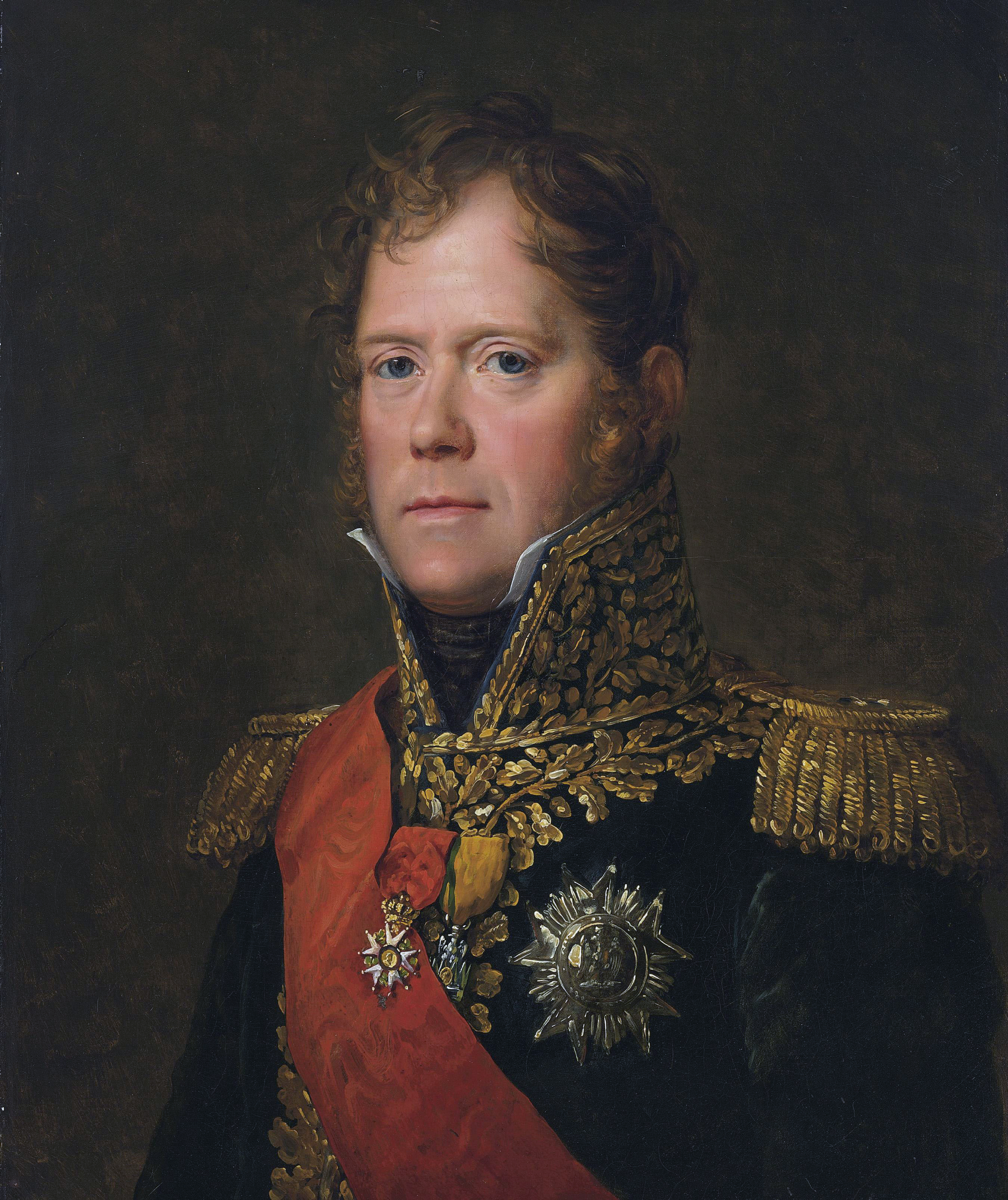
Michel Ney, who received his marshal's baton on 19 May 1804

- Louis-Alexandre Berthier, Prince of Neuchâtel and of Wagram, Duke of Valangin (1753–1815), Marshal of the Empire in 1804
- Joachim Murat, Prince of the Empire, Grand Duke of Berg, King of Naples (1767–1815), Marshal of the Empire in 1804
- Bon-Adrien Jeannot de Moncey, Duke of Conégliano (1754–1842), Marshal of the Empire in 1804
- Jean-Baptiste Jourdan, Count of the Empire (1762–1833), Marshal of the Empire in 1804
- André Masséna, Duke of Rivoli, Prince of Essling (1758–1817), Marshal of the Empire in 1804
- Pierre Augereau, Duke of Castiglione (1757–1816), Marshal of the Empire in 1804
- Jean-Baptiste Bernadotte (1763–1844), Prince of Pontecorvo, King of Sweden and Norway under the name Charles XIV John (1818–1844), Marshal of the Empire in 1804
- Guillaume Marie-Anne Brune, Count of the Empire (1763–1815), Marshal of the Empire in 1804
- Jean-de-Dieu Soult, Duke of Dalmatie (1769–1851), Marshal of the Empire in 1804, Marshal General of France in 1847
- Jean Lannes, Duke of Montebello (1769–1809), Marshal of the Empire in 1804 †
- Édouard Mortier, Duke of Trévise (1768–1835), Marshal of the Empire in 1804
- Michel Ney, Duke of Elchingen, Prince of the Moskva (1769–1815), Marshal of the Empire in 1804
- Louis-Nicolas Davout, Duke of Auerstädt, Prince of Eckmühl (1770–1823), Marshal of the Empire in 1804
- Jean-Baptiste Bessières, Duke of Istria (1768–1813), Marshal of the Empire in 1804 †
- François Christophe de Kellermann, Duke of Valmy (1737–1820), Marshal of the Empire in 1804 (honorary)
- François Joseph Lefebvre, Duke of Danzig (1755–1820), Marshal of the Empire in 1804 (honorary)
- Catherine-Dominique de Pérignon, Marquis of Grenade (1754–1818), Marshal of the Empire in 1804 (honorary)
- Jean-Mathieu-Philibert Sérurier, Count of the Empire (1742–1819), Marshal of the Empire in 1804 (honorary)
- Claude Victor-Perrin, Duke of Belluno (1764–1841), Marshal of the Empire in 1807
- Jacques MacDonald, Duke of Tarento (1765–1840), Marshal of the Empire in 1809
- Nicolas Oudinot, Duke of Reggio (1767–1847), Marshal of the Empire in 1809
- Auguste de Marmont, Duke of Ragusa (1774–1852), Marshal of the Empire in 1809
- Louis-Gabriel Suchet, Duke of Albufera (1770–1826), Marshal of the Empire in 1811
- Laurent de Gouvion Saint-Cyr, Marquis of Gouvion-Saint-Cyr (1764–1830), Marshal of the Empire in 1812
- Józef Poniatowski, Polish Prince Poniatowski (1763–1813), Marshal of the Empire in 1813 †
- Emmanuel de Grouchy, Marquis of Grouchy (1766–1847), Marshal of the Empire in 1815

The names of nineteen of these have been given to successive stretches of boulevards encircling Paris, which has thus been nicknamed the Boulevards des Maréchaux (Boulevards of the Marshals). Another three Marshals have been honored with a street elsewhere in the city. The four Marshals banned from memory are: Bernadotte and Marmont, considered as traitors; Pérignon, stricken off the list by Napoleon in 1815; and Grouchy, regarded as responsible for the defeat at Waterloo.

== Restoration ==
=== Louis XVIII, 1815–1824 ===
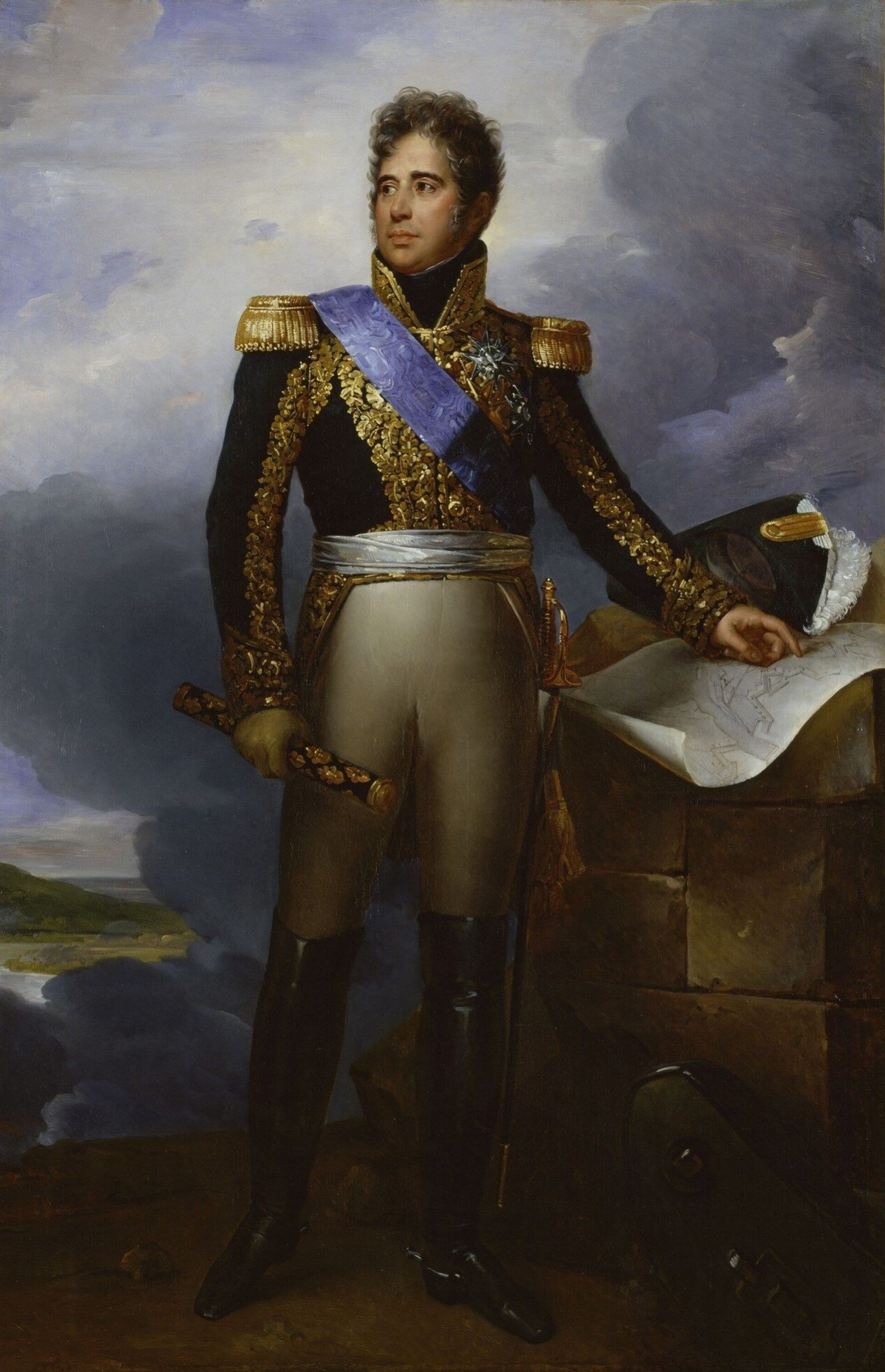
Jacques Lauriston

- Georges Cadoudal (1771–1804), Marshal of France in 1814 (posthumous)
- Jean Victor Marie Moreau (1763–1813), Marshal of France in 1814 (posthumous)
- François-Henri de Franquetot de Coigny, Duke of Coigny (1737–1821), Marshal of France in 1816
- Henri Jacques Guillaume Clarke, Duke of Feltre (1765–1818), Marshal of France in 1816
- Pierre Riel de Beurnonville, Marquis of Beurnonville (1752–1821), Marshal of France in 1816
- Charles Joseph Hyacinthe du Houx de Viomesnil, Marquis of Viomesnil (1734–1827), Marshal of France in 1816
- Jacques Alexandre Law, Marquis of Lauriston (1768–1828), Marshal of France in 1823
- Gabriel Jean Joseph Molitor, Count Molitor (1770–1849), Marshal of France in 1823

=== Charles X, 1824–1830 ===
- Louis Aloy de Hohenlohe-Waldenburg-Bartenstein, Prince of Hohnlohe-Waldenburg-Bartenstein (1765–1829), Marshal of France in 1827
- Nicolas Joseph Maison, Marquis Maison (1771–1840), Marshal of France in 1829
- Louis Auguste Victor de Ghaisne de Bourmont, Count of Bourmont (1773–1846), Marshal of France in 1830

== July Monarchy ==
=== Louis-Philippe 1830–1848 ===
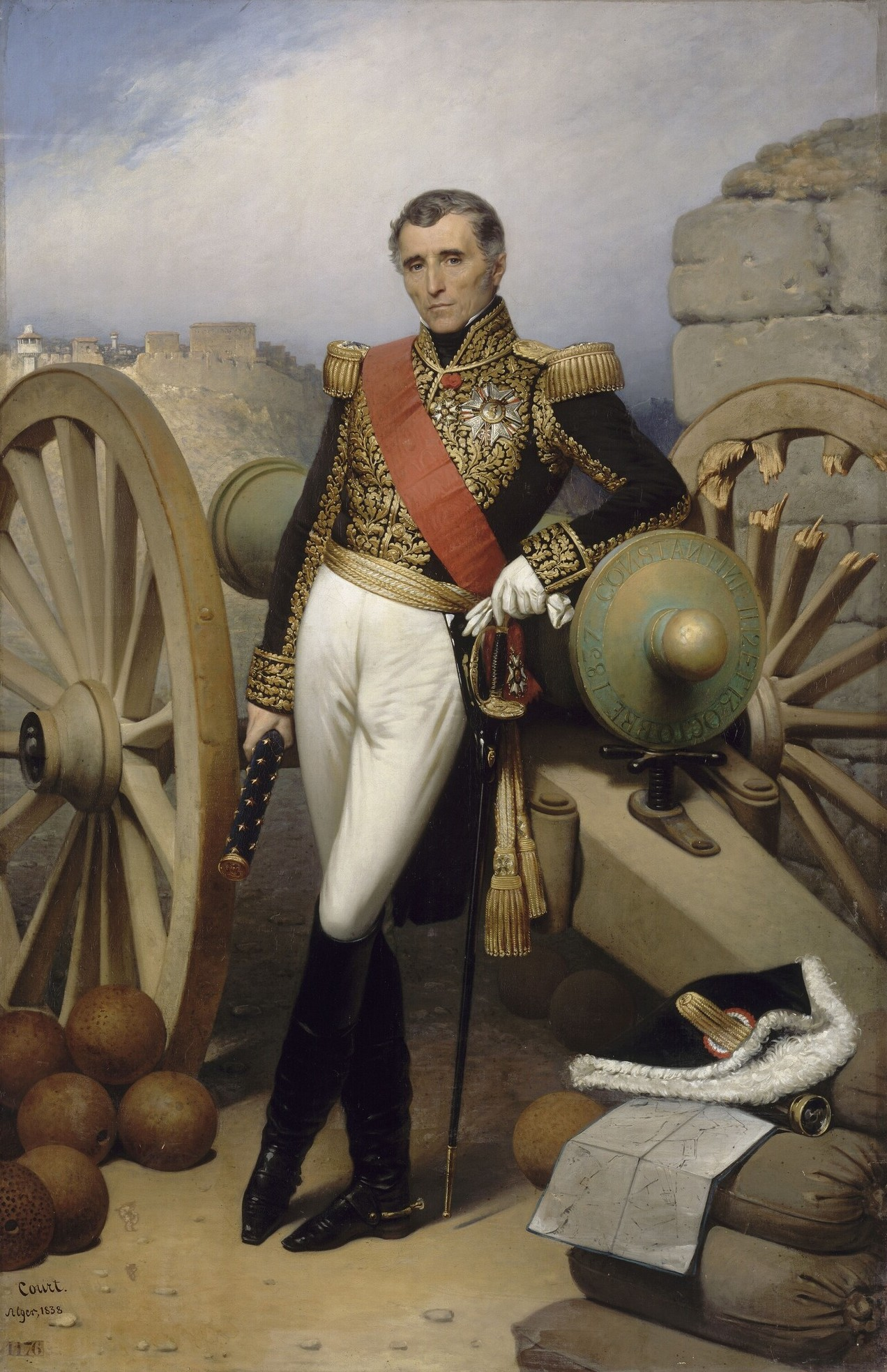
Sylvain Charles Valée

- Étienne Maurice Gérard, Count Gérard (1773–1852), Marshal of France in 1830
- Bertrand Clauzel, Count Clauzel (1772–1842), Marshal of France in 1831
- Emmanuel de Grouchy, Marquis of Grouchy (1766–1847), Marshal of France in 1831
- Georges Mouton, Count Lobau (1770–1838), Marshal of France in 1831
- Sylvain Charles Valée, Count Valée (1773–1846), Marshal of France in 1837
- Horace Sébastiani, Count Sébastiani (1772–1851), Marshal of France in 1840
- Jean-Baptiste Drouet, Count d'Erlon (1765–1844), Marshal of France in 1843
- Thomas Robert Bugeaud, Duke of Isly (1784–1849), Marshal of France in 1843
- Honoré Charles Reille, Count Reille (1775–1860), Marshal of France in 1847
- Guillaume Dode de la Brunerie, Viscount de la Brunerie (1775–1851), Marshal of France in 1847

== Second Republic ==
=== Louis-Napoleon Bonaparte, 1848–1852 ===
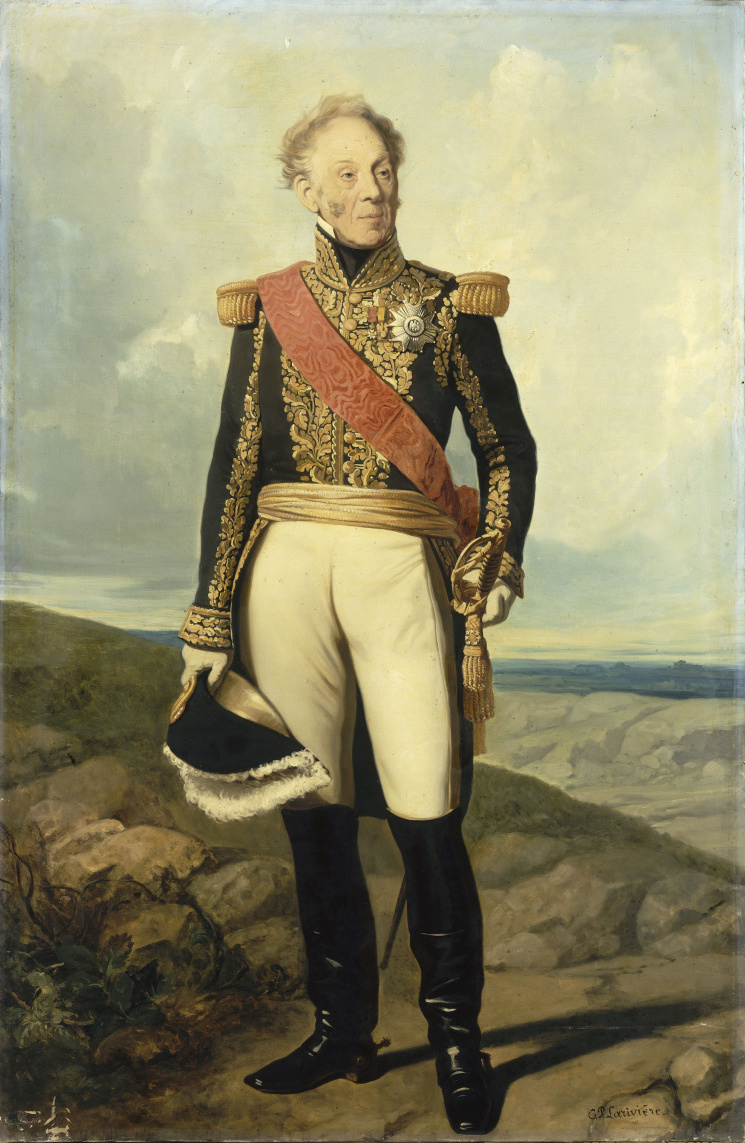
Rémi Joseph Isidore Exelmans

- Jérôme Bonaparte, former King of Westphalia (1784–1860), Marshal of France in 1850
- Rémi Joseph Isidore Exelmans, Count Exelmans (1775–1852), Marshal of France in 1851
- Jean Isidore Harispe, Count Harispe (1768–1855), Marshal of France in 1851
- Jean-Baptiste Philibert Vaillant, Count Vaillant (1790–1872), Marshal of France in 1851
- Jacques Leroy de Saint-Arnaud (1798–1854), Marshal of France in 1852
- Bernard Pierre Magnan (1791–1865), Marshal of France in 1852
- Boniface de Castellane, Marquis of Castellane (1788–1862), Marshal of France in 1852

== Second Empire ==
=== Napoleon III, 1852–1870 ===
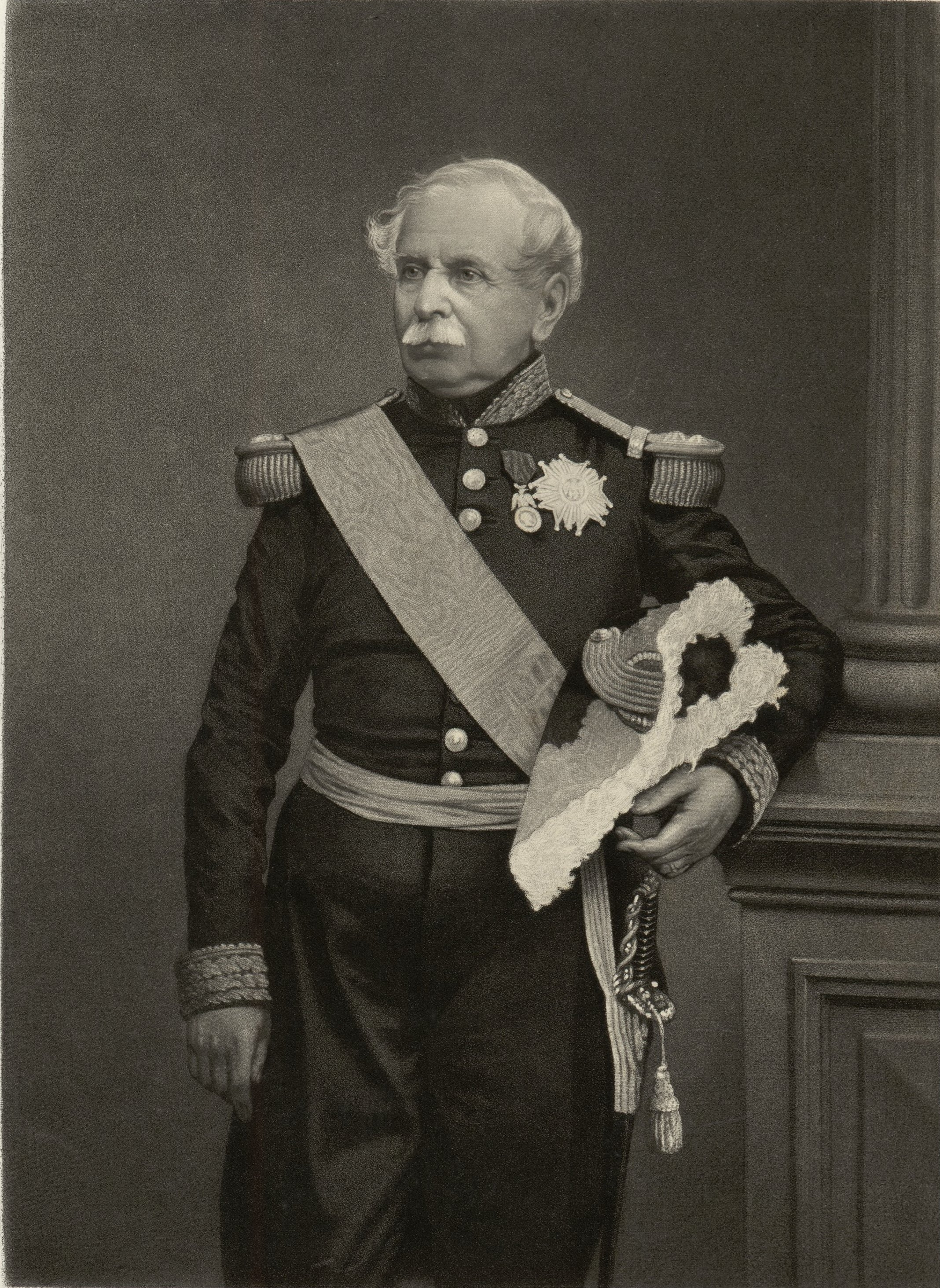
Jacques Louis Randon

- Achille Baraguey d'Hilliers, Count Baraguey d'Hilliers (1795–1878), Marshal of France in 1854
- Aimable Pélissier, Duke of Malakoff (1794–1864), Marshal of France in 1855
- Jacques Louis Randon, Count Randon (1795–1871), Marshal of France in 1856
- François Certain de Canrobert (1809–1895), Marshal of France in 1856
- Pierre Bosquet (1810–1861), Marshal of France in 1856
- Patrice de MacMahon, Duke of Magenta (1809–1893), Marshal of France in 1859
- Auguste Regnaud de Saint-Jean d'Angély (1794–1870), Marshal of France in 1859
- Adolphe Niel (1802–1869), Marshal of France in 1859
- Philippe Antoine d'Ornano, Count of Ornano (1784–1863), Marshal of France in 1861
- Élie Frédéric Forey (1804–1872), Marshal of France in 1863
- François Achille Bazaine (1811–1888), Marshal of France in 1864
- Edmond Le Bœuf (1809–1888), Marshal of France in 1870

== Third Republic ==
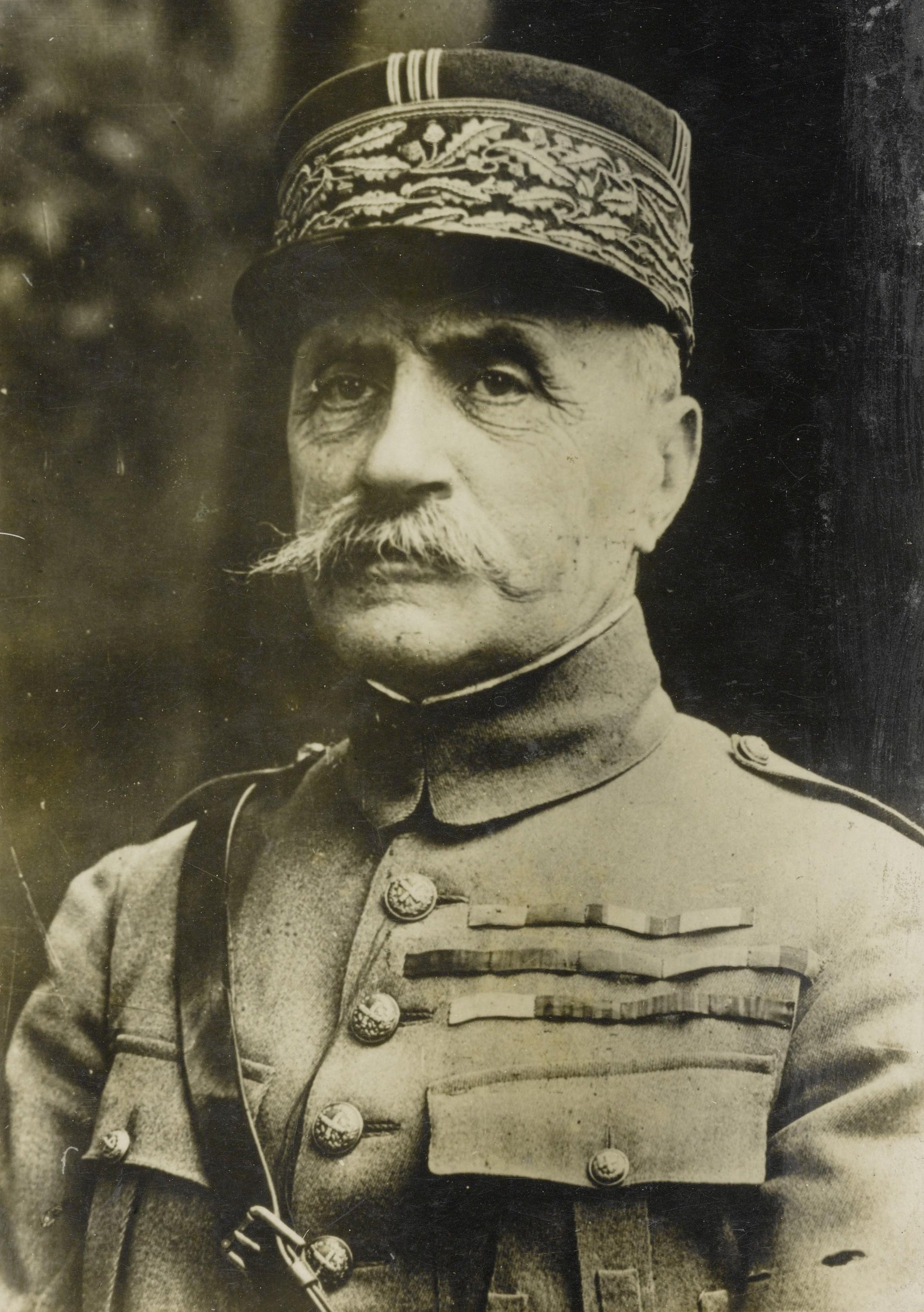
Ferdinand Foch

=== Raymond Poincaré, 1913–1920 ===
- Joseph Joffre (1852–1931), Marshal of France in 1916
- Ferdinand Foch (1851–1929), Marshal of France in 1918
- Philippe Pétain (1856–1951), Marshal of France in 1918

=== Alexandre Millerand, 1920–1924 ===
- Joseph Gallieni (1849–1916), Marshal of France in 1921 (posthumous)
- Hubert Lyautey (1854–1934), Marshal of France in 1921
- Louis Franchet d'Espèrey (1856–1942), Marshal of France in 1921
- Marie Émile Fayolle (1852–1928), Marshal of France in 1921
- Michel-Joseph Maunoury (1847–1923), Marshal of France in 1923 (posthumous)

== Fourth Republic ==
=== Vincent Auriol, 1947–1954 ===
- Jean de Lattre de Tassigny (1889–1952), Marshal of France in 1952 (posthumous)
- Philippe Leclerc de Hauteclocque (1902–1947), Marshal of France in 1952 (posthumous)
- Alphonse Juin (1888–1967), Marshal of France in 1952

== Fifth Republic ==
=== François Mitterrand, 1981–1995 ===
- Marie-Pierre Kœnig (1898–1970), Marshal of France in 1984 (posthumous)

== Refused ==
This distinction was refused by:

- Eugène Cavaignac (1802–1857), head of the Government of the Second Republic, in 1848
- Louis-Jules Trochu (1815–1896), head of the Government of National Defense, in 1871
- Charles de Gaulle (1890–1970), president of the Provisional Government of the French Republic, in 1946.

== See also ==
- Admiral of France
- Constable of France
- Marshal of the Empire
- Marshal General of France
