= Johann Wilhelm von Hunolstein =

17th-century Lorrain soldier of the Holy Roman Empire

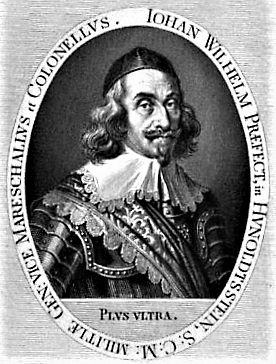
- Johann Wilhelm, Vogt von Hunolstein
- Born: 24 April 1599; Château-Voué, Duchy of Lorraine
- Died: 29 July 1664 (aged 65); Wrocław, Silesia
- Military career
- Allegiance: Holy Roman Empire; Duchy of Lorraine; Electorate of Bavaria
- Service years: 1623–1660
- Rank: Generalfeldzeugmeister
- Conflicts: Thirty Years' War: Siege of Höxter, 1640; Siege of Neunburg, 1641; Siege of Magdeburg, 1644; Siege of Krems, 1646; Siege of Korneuburg, 1646; Siege of Marburg, 1647; Battle of Zusmarshausen, 1648; Siege of Wasserburg, 1648; Second Northern War

Johann Wilhelm von Hunolstein (French: Jean-Guillaume de Hunolstein; 24 April 1599 – 29 July 1664), also known as Hunoltstein or Hunoldstein, was a professional soldier in Lorrain, Bavarian and Imperial military service during the Thirty Years' War. Since 1643, he was part of the General Staff of the Imperial supreme commanders Gallas and Melander, and commanded himself the entire infantry of either the Imperial or the Bavarian field army.

He often personally commanded dangerous missions like rescuing the remnants of the ruined Imperial army that had supported Denmark in the Torstenson War. In the last military campaign of the war in 1648, he became the main commander of the Bavarian army.

Afterwards, he briefly held the post of supreme commander of the forces of the Kölner Allianz, a predecessor of the League of the Rhine, and served as military commander of Silesia for the Habsburgs during the Second Northern War.

== Life and career ==
Born as second son of Wilhelm von Hunolstein († 1607) and Anna Maria von Landsberg († 1636) in Château-Voué (German: Dürkastel) in the Duchy of Lorraine, he was initially designated for an ecclesiastical career and studied at Pont-à-Mousson. His family was an Hunsrückian knightly house that originated from Castle Hunolstein in Morbach. In 1614, he was appointed as capitular of Trier but he resigned his post in 1623 to focus on his military career. His elder brother Jean-Marceloff († 1639) left him the possession of the castle of Château-Voué to administrate it in Johann Wilhelm's absence.

=== Thirty Years' War ===
Hunolstein joined the army of the Catholic League at some time, he already held the rank of captain when he was stationed in the Münsterland under Count Anholt in 1623. In the next year, he became chamberlain of the Duke of Lorrain. Two years later, he was promoted to lieutenant colonel. He gained his own regiment of infantry in 1632. For some years, he campaigned under the exiled Duke Charles IV of Lorraine. In 1636, Charles appointed Hunolstein to governor of Bouquenom and Sarrewerden. He switched to the Bavarian army on 2 February 1639 as Generalfeldwachtmeister but still held close connections to the Duke of Lorraine. In March 1640, Duke Charles named him as governor of Marsal in Lorraine. His troops fought afterwards in Northern Germany and took part at the capture of Höxter in autumn 1640.

During the Swedish invasion of the Upper Palatinate in early 1641, he became military commander of Amberg on 14 January. Two months later, he was recalled to the field army that chased the Swedes under Johan Banér out of the Upper Palatinate. Hunolstein's regiment was present at the siege of Neunburg vorm Wald where Banér's rearguard was encircled and brought to capitulation on 21 March. At the same time, he was entrusted by Duke Charles of Lorrain to announce the negotiations between Charles and the French crown to Emperor Ferdinand III and Elector Maximilian of Bavaria. Duke Charles who broke relations with France again after a short period made Hunolstein to governor of Bitche on 16 July 1641.

In 1642, Hunolstein changed to the Imperial army. He and Adrian von Enkevort were appointed into the General Staff of the supreme commander Matthias Gallas in 1643. In January 1644, he led an expedition with 1,000 men to supply the besieged Magdeburg. He was however caught by the sieging Swedes under Königsmarck and had to retreat under constant attacks. Hunolstein accompanied Gallas on his Holstein campaign to support Denmark against the Swedes under Torstensson in summer 1644. As the Imperial army was forced to retreat and enclosed by the Swedes first at Bernburg and later in Magdeburg where they run out of food, Hunolstein temporarily thought of leaving the army. In the end, he led the last 1,400 healthy footsoldiers of the army along with 12 field guns and some horsemen safely from Magdeburg over Wittenberg to Bohemia in January 1645 while Gallas was fallen ill.

It is not clear if Hunolstein participated in the defeat at Jankau on 6 March as the exhausted infantry of Gallas’ ruined army stayed back at Prague. On 3 April, he was promoted to Lieutenant field marshal. His next task was defending the Danube against the Swedish incursion in Lower Austria. He prevented all Swedish crossing attempts and managed to recapture the Danube Island at Krems on 31 May that Swedish troops had taken in March to close the river. However, his following coup on the weak defended Krems failed because Torstensson had sent 1,500 men just in time to reinforce the garrison. Over the following year, Hunolstein took part at recapturing the remaining Swedish strongholds in Lower Austria. From April to May 1646, he commanded the siege works at the reconquest of Krems under the supreme command of Hans Christoph von Puchheim. After the capitulation of Krems on 5 May, the Imperials besieged Korneuburg. It surrendered after fierce resistance on 4 August to be garrisoned by Hunolstein's regiment.

In 1647, he commanded the infantry of the Imperial army under the new supreme commander Peter Melander, Graf von Holzappel, on the defensive campaign in Bohemia and the following offensive into Hesse towards Marburg. On 15 October, Elector Maximilian asked the emperor to leave him Hunolstein for his army to take command of the siege of Memmingen instead of the Imperial general Enkevort. The emperor allowed Hunolstein's changeover but because Memmingen soon capitulated, Hunolstein stayed into Imperial service as long as Melander needed him. The Imperial army retreated from Hesse in January 1648. Hunolstein with the infantry and Raimondo Montecuccoli with the cavalry took blocking emplacements behind the Franconian Saale to repel possible Swedish attacks.

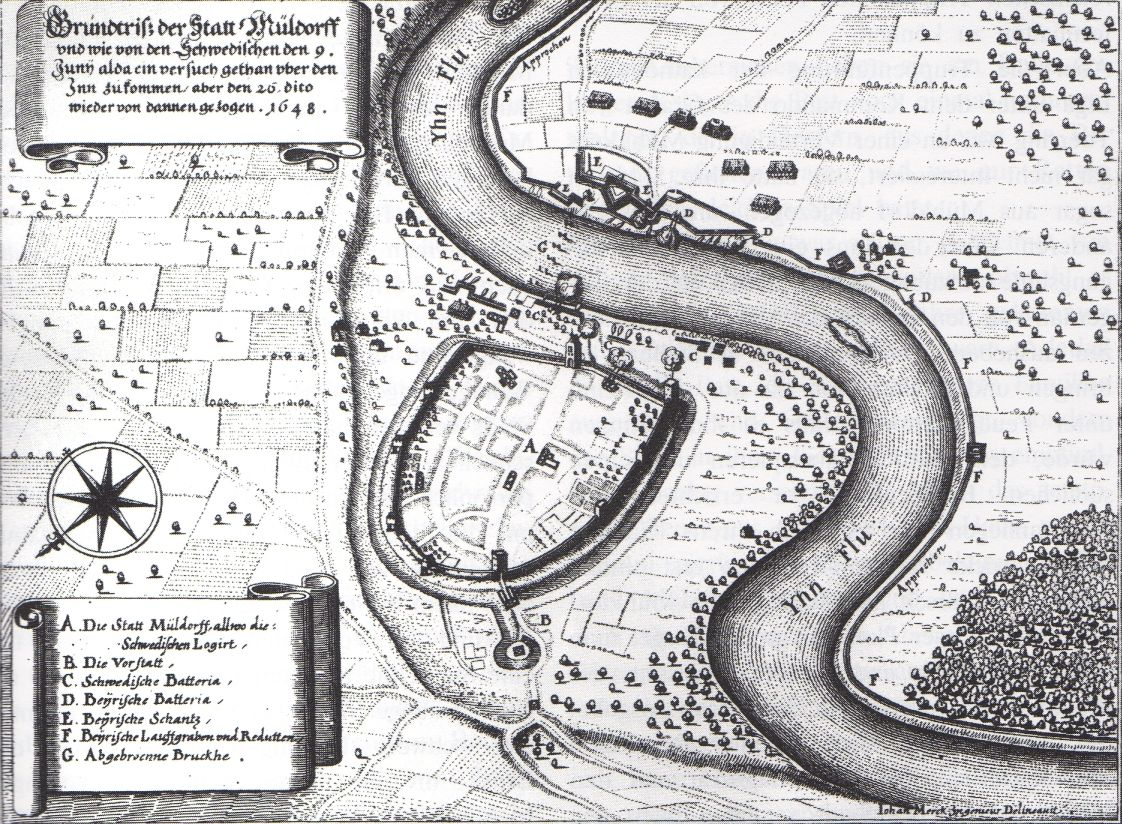
The Bavarian emplacements against the Swedes at Mühldorf 1648

In March, Hunolstein changed back to the Bavarian army where he was promoted to Generalfeldzeugmeister and became teacher to hereditary prince Ferdinand Maria in military science. He fought at Zusmarshausen under Jost Maximilian von Gronsfeld. As the latter was deposed and imprisoned by the Elector because of his retreat from the Lech river following the defeat at Zusmarshausen, Hunolstein became his interim successor as Bavarian commander. He was the only officer that had objected the retreat in the war council, anticipating the Elector's furious reaction. Together with the new Imperial commander Piccolomini and Johann von Reuschenberg, he defended the river Inn against the Swedes. Piccolomini put his own infantry under Hunolstein's command to hold the river. The Swedes under Wrangel failed crossing it in Wasserburg because of the resistance of the garrison as well as in Mühldorf because of Hunolstein's defences and the high water-level. As Maximilian of Bavaria did not make Hunolstein but the higher-ranking Adrian von Enkevort the definitive successor of Gronsfeld as his main commander on 2 August, he felt passed over and took his leave from the army.

=== Later career ===
After the war, Hunolstein returned to his Lorrain estates. But because of his opposition to France throughout the war and his close connections to the exiled Duke Charles, he was expelled from his lands by France in 1654. He found shelter near Koblenz where he possessed the dominion of Mühlenbach via his wife. In 1655, the Kölner Allianz, a predecessor of the League of the Rhine as an alliance between the Bishops of Mainz, Trier, Cologne and Münster as well as the Duke of Jülich and Berg, engaged him as commander of their combined forces. However, Hunolstein left this post at the end of the same year because Emperor Ferdinand III offered him to return into his service.

The Emperor elevated Hunolstein to the Bohemian nobility in 1656. He was also made Freiherr and member of the Hofkriegsrat. After the Imperials joined Poland in the Second Northern War against Sweden, he was appointed to military commander of Silesia on 14 July 1657. In 1661, he was allowed to return to his estates at Château-Voué by Emperor Leopold I. On 13 December 1663, the reinstated Duke Charles of Lorraine acknowledged Hunolstein the possession of the villages Virming and Conthil that he had given him before to thank him for his services. He died on 29 July 1664 in Wrocław.

== Family ==
Hunolstein married Maria Elisabeth von Steinkallenfels († 1669) in 1628. Together, they had 16 children of which five died in infancy. Three sons survived their childhood, two of them became capitulars in Mainz and Würzburg, the inheritance went to the eldest surviving son Franz Felix Karl († 1675) who married Elisabeth von Hatzfeld, a niece of the Imperial general Melchior von Hatzfeldt. Three daughters entered the ladies chapter in Épinal where Hunolstein's daughter Felicité became abbess in 1699.

== Sources ==
- Bayerisches Kriegsarchiv, ed. (1901). Geschichte des bayerischen Heeres (Bd. 1): Geschichte des kurbayerischen Heers insbesondere unter Kurfürst Ferdinand Maria 1651–1679 (in German). München: J. Lindauer.
- Braumüller, Wilhelm, ed. (1849). Quellen und Forschungen zur vaterländischen Geschichte, Literatur und Kunst (in German). Wien.
- Guthrie, William P. (2003). The Later Thirty Years War: From the Battle of Wittstock to the Treaty of Westphalia. Greenwood Press. ISBN 9780313324086.
- Höbelt, Lothar (2016). Von Nördlingen bis Jankau: Kaiserliche Strategie und Kriegsführung 1634-1645 (in German). Wien: Heeresgeschichtliches Museum. ISBN 978-3902551733.
- Höfer, Ernst (1997). Das Ende des Dreißigjährigen Krieges. Strategie und Kriegsbild (in German). Köln/Weimar/Wien: Böhlau. ISBN 978-3-412-04297-4.
- Jean, L. (1897). Les seigneurs de Chateauvoué 966–1793 (in French). Nancy: Crépin-Leblond.
- Joachim, Erich (1886). Die Entwickelung des Rheinbunds vom Jahre 1658 (in German). Leipzig: Veit & Comp. doi:10.1515/9783112439500. ISBN 9783112439500. S2CID 240625501.
- Petiot, Alain (2005). Les Lorrains et l'empire (in French). Mémoire & documents. ISBN 9782914611374.
- Rebitsch, Robert (2006). Matthias Gallas (1588–1647). Generalleutnant des Kaisers zur Zeit des Dreißigjährigen Krieges. Eine militärische Biographie (in German). Münster: Aschendorff Verlag. ISBN 978-3-402065761.
- Toepfer, Friedrich (1872). Urkundenbuch für die Geschichte des gräflichen und freiherrlichen Hauses der Vögte von Hunolstein (Bd. 3) (in German). Nürnberg: Fr. Campe & Sohn.
- Warlich, Bernd (2012). "Hunolstein zu Dürrkastel, Johann Wilhelm Freiherr Vogt von". Der Dreißigjährige Krieg in Selbstzeugnissen, Chroniken und Berichten (in German).
