= Battle of Dachau =

1648 battle of the Thirty Years' War

- Part of the Thirty Years' War
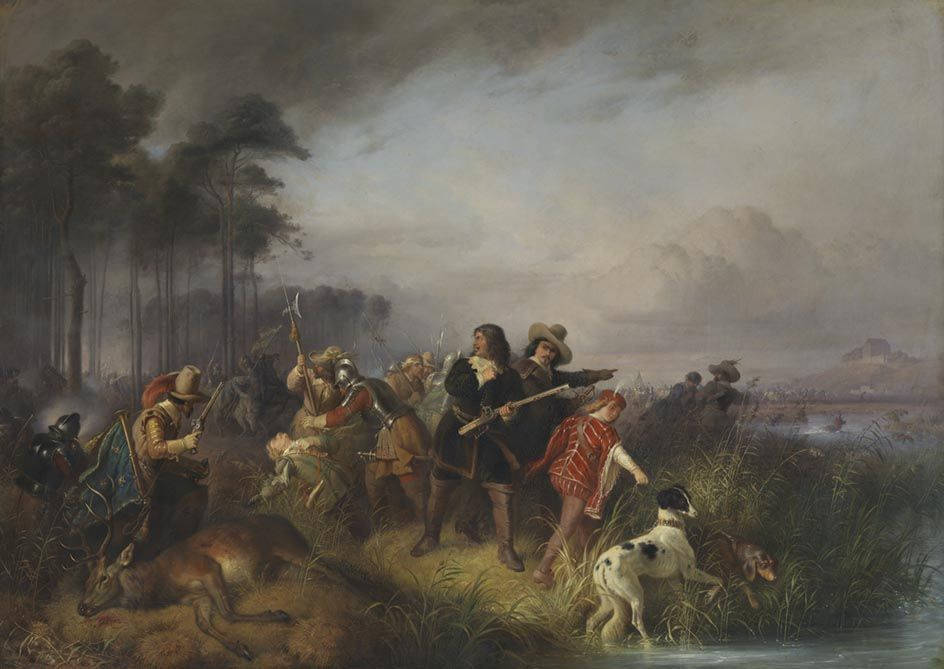
- General Wrangel surprised by the enemy on a hunt (near Dachau)
Date	October 5th, 1648
Location	Dachau, Electorate of Bavaria (present-day Germany)
Result	Imperial-Bavarian victory

Belligerents
(yes) Swedish Empire; France	Bavaria; Holy Roman Empire

Commanders and leaders
(Swedish Empire) Carl Gustaf Wrangel (Kingdom of France) Henri de Turenne	Ottavio Piccolomini (Holy Roman Empire) Johann von Werth (Holy Roman Empire) Raimondo Montecuccoli (Electorate of Bavaria) Adrian von Enkevort (Electorate of Bavaria) Johann von Reuschenberg

Strength
15 cavalry regiments or 1,400 cavalry 600 infantry	Unknown

Casualties and losses
200 killed 94 captured 1,000 horses	Light

The Battle of Dachau was a battle that took place in the Thirty Years' War during 1648 in the town of Dachau, north of Munich, Bavaria. It took place in the final weeks of the war, when the French and Swedish forces were trying to pressure the Electorate of Bavaria. In the end, the Imperial-Bavarian army won the battle, though it was more of a skirmish than an actual battle.

== Background ==
Following the Battle of Zusmarshausen, the Franco-Swedish army under the command of Carl Gustaf Wrangel and Henri de Turenne invaded Bavaria. The Imperial-Bavarian army fell back across the Inn. Following his poor performance at Zusmarshausen, the Bavarian commander Jost Maximilian von Bronckhorst-Gronsfeld was arrested and replaced by Adrian von Enkevort. The Bavarian army, numbering 10,000, was joined by 14,000 Imperials, under the command of Ottavio Piccolomini and Johann von Werth.

A Swedish attempts to cross the Inn at Wasserburg am Inn failed, as Bavarian commander Johann Wilhelm von Hunolstein managed to successfully defend Inn. The Franco-Swedish army was led by Carl Gustaf Wrangel who came from Franconia and attacked some forces at the north of Munich near Dachau. The Bavarian and Imperial forces led by Maximilian I responded which led to a minor skirmish which resulted in a Swedish victory. Bavarian troops repositioned and the Swedish could not capture Munich before the Treaty of Westphalia and the end of the war.

== Battle ==
Piccolomini learned that Wrangel and Turenne had gone hunting in the Dachau woods on October 6. The Imperial-Bavarian cavalry was divided into three units: Johann von Werth swept the terrain to the left of the road, while Bavarian Field Marshal Johan von Reuschenberg advanced with his units directly along the road itself. The terrain to the right of the road was secured by Imperial General Raimondo Montecuccoli and Bavarian Field Marshal Adrian von Enkevort. Piccolomini himself followed with the Bavarians.

Despite putting 15 French-Swedish cavalry regiments (Note: 1,400 cavalry according to Wilson) and 600 infantry around the edge of the woods, Werth's men firing, until a Swedish captain and lieutenant were shot. In the battle twenty officers disappeared in the bogs, despite Wrangel managing to escape. The Imperial-Bavarian cavalry managed to surprise the Swedes not far from the village of Feldmoching and drive them back as far as Dachau. According to Wilson, the Bavarians and Imperials took 94 prisoners and 1,000 horses. Enkevort later reported that 200 men were killed and several hundred taken prisoner.

== Aftermath ==
In retaliation the Franco-Swedish army burned nearby Bavarian villages. Not long after the battle, the Peace of Westphalia was signed, which ended the war. The battle had little effect on the overall outcome of the war.

== Sources ==
- Höfer, Ernst (1997). Das Ende des Dreißigjährigen Krieges. Strategie und Kriegsbild (in German). Köln/Weimar/Wien: Böhlau. ISBN 978-3-412-04297-4.
- Carl von Landmann (1877). "Adrian Graf von Enkevort" . Allgemeine Deutsche Biographie (in German). Vol. 6. Leipzig: Duncker & Humblot. pp. 148–150.
- Wilson, Peter H. (2009). The Thirty Years War: Europe's tragedy. Cambridge, Mass: Belknap Press of Harvard University Press. ISBN 978-0-674-03634-5.
- Parker, Geoffrey; Adams, Simon, eds. (1997). The Thirty Years' War (2nd [rev.] ed.). London; New York: Routledge. ISBN 978-0-415-15458-1.
- Guthrie, William P. (2003). The later Thirty Years War: from the Battle of Wittstock to the Treaty of Westphalia. Contributions in military studies. Westport, Conn: Greenwood Press. ISBN 978-0-313-32408-6.
- Hormayr, Joseph von, ed. (2022). Taschenbuch für die vaterländische Geschichte. Taschenbuch für die vaterländische Geschichte (Reprint 2021 ed.). Berlin Boston: De Gruyter. ISBN 978-3-11-245914-0.
- Bogl, Johann N.; Hormayr, Joseph von; Vogl, Johann N., eds. (2022). Taschenbuch für die vaterländische Geschichte. Taschenbuch für die vaterländische Geschichte (Reprint 2021 ed.). Berlin Boston: De Gruyter. ISBN 978-3-11-245915-7.
- Barthold, Friedrich Wilhelm (1842). History of the Great German War from the Death of Gustavus Adolphus Onward, with Special Consideration of France (Geschichte Des Grossen Deutschen Krieges Vom Tode Gustav Adolfs Ab: Mit Besonderer Rücksicht Auf Frankreich). S.G. Liesching.
- Lahrkamp, Helmut (1962). Jan von Werth. Sein Leben nach archivalischen Quellenzeugnissen (in German). Köln: Der Löwe.
- Liebhart, Wilhelm (1981). "Amperland" (PDF). Amperland. pp. 135–137. Archived (PDF) from the original on 2025-10-16.
