= Battle of Jüterbog =

1644 battle of the Thirty Years' War

Coordinates: 51.9933°N 13.0728°E

- Part of the Thirty Years' War
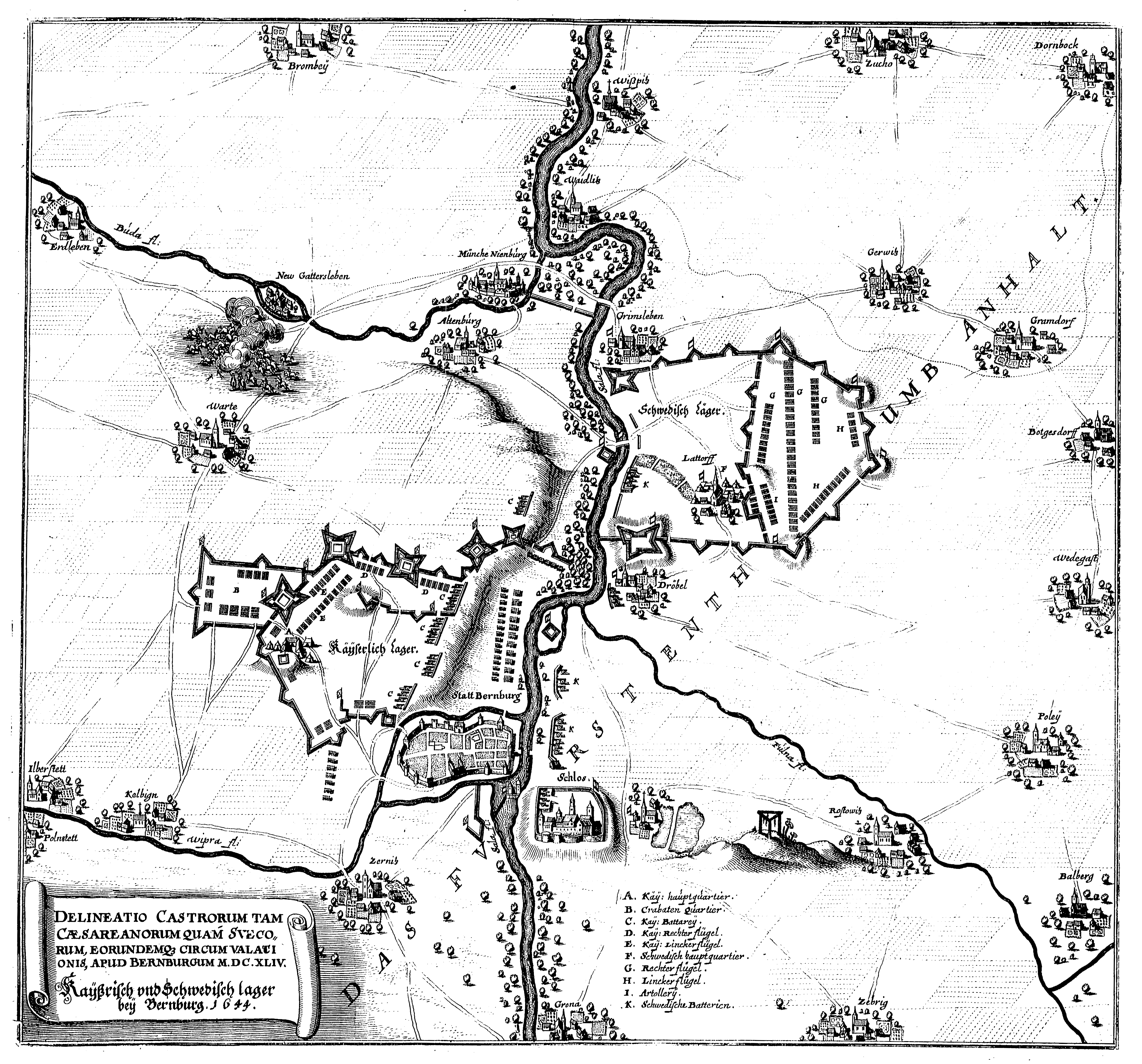
- Swedish and Imperial encampments prior to the battle
Date	23 November 1644 (O.S.); 3 December 1644 (N.S.)
Location	Near Jüterbog, 50 km south of Berlin
Result	Swedish victory

Belligerents
Swedish Empire	Holy Roman Empire

Commanders and leaders
Lennart Torstenson	Adrian von Enkevort (POW); Count Bruay

Strength
18,000	4,000 cavalry

Casualties and losses
400 killed or wounded	1,000 killed or wounded, 1,600 men and 3,500 horses captured

The Battle of Jüterbog was fought in Jüterbog on 3 December 1644 between Sweden and the Holy Roman Empire, resulting in a Swedish victory. The cavalry of the main Imperial army tried to break out of its blockade by the Swedish in Magdeburg but was caught and mostly shattered by the Swedes.

== Background ==
Field Marshal Lennart Torstenson had unexpectedly marched into Jutland in September 1643 (see Torstenson War). While engaged in operations there, an Imperial army under the command of Count Matthias Gallas ventured north towards Jutland to trap the Swedish army there and destroy it. The Emperor had received requests from Denmark-Norway for help, as well as assurance that the Swedish forces were worn down and therefore a fairly easy target. However, since Torstenson thought of Gallas' approaching army of about 15,000 men as a threat to the important Swedish strongholds on the German Baltic coast, he turned his army around and headed south to engage the enemy.

Gallas had his troops build and stay behind abatises and entrenchments south of the river Eider in Holstein in an attempt to trap the Swedish forces on Jutland. This tactic failed, as Torstenson's troops outmanoeuvred the enemy by overthrowing a few Imperial positions and pose a threat both to Gallas' back, and Imperial areas further south. The Imperial army began to move south. During the summer of 1644, Torstenson's forces tried to engage the retreating enemy, and in late September, they had once more caught up with the Imperial army. Gallas responded by ordering his troops to build strong defensive positions and await wished-for reinforcement. The Imperial halting-place at Bernburg, south of Magdeburg, was soon surrounded by the Swedish, who cut off all supplies for Gallas' men. Eventually, the Imperial side ran out of bread and they started to lose people to sickness and starvation. As huge numbers of people and animals died, Gallas saw no other solution but to abandon many of the sick, most of his artillery as well as the baggage, and search protection for his troops in Magdeburg itself, a fortress of his Saxon allies. The pattern repeated itself when the Swedish forces managed to enclose the city and cut off the supply. One night, the Imperial cavalry made an attempt to break out.

== Battle ==
The rear guard of the Imperial cavalry under Adrian von Enkevort was caught close to the town of Jüterbog. It was almost wiped out and Enkevort made captive. The Swedish also captured 3,500 horses. The remaining Imperial cavalry under Albert Gaston Spinola, Count of Bruay, barely escaped into Lusatia. Among those who managed to escape were the formally most high-ranking officer Anne-François de Bassompierre who reported to the Saxon elector as well as Raimondo Montecuccoli who reported to emperor Ferdinand III in Linz on 16 December.

== Aftermath ==
It took a while for the Imperial forces in Magdeburg to succeed with a breakaway. Before they did, they had to turn to eating both cats and dogs as their situation grew more desperate. Many of them deserted. Most of the soldiers who aimed to switch sides and join the Swedish forces were judged to be too weak and were therefore ignored by the Swedish.

After getting some help from drift ice that ruined Swedish bridges on river Elbe, Gallas ordered his troops to make a desperate effort to break out of the Swedish encirclement. While he was himself sick and stayed with the ill soldiers, his subordinate Hunolstein led the remaining 1,400 infantry able to march, together with a few horsemen and 12 field guns, via Wittenberg to Bohemia in early January 1645. They safely reached Prague in February. Out of 12,000 Imperial soldiers that constituted Gallas' army in the summer of 1644, a few thousand men returned. As a result of the severe fiasco the campaign turned out to be, and the tactical mistakes he made, Gallas was relieved from his duty as Imperial commander.

== Sources ==
- Bodart, Gaston (1908). Militär-historisches Kriegs-Lexikon (1618-1905).
- Höbelt, Lothar (2016). Von Nördlingen bis Jankau: Kaiserliche Strategie und Kriegsführung 1634-1645 (in German). Wien: Heeresgeschichtliches Museum. ISBN 978-3902551733.
- Englund, Peter (2003), Ofredsår (in Swedish), Stockholm: Atlantis, ISBN 91-7486-349-5
