= Adrian von Enkevort =

17th-century military officer

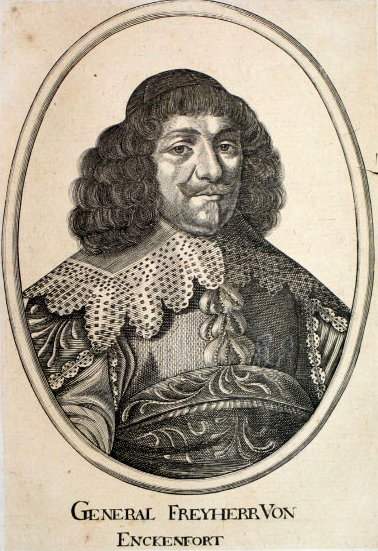
- Adrian von Enkevort
- Born: 20 August 1603; Diest, Spanish Netherlands
- Died: 3 June 1663 (aged 59) Ledeč nad Sázavou, Holy Roman Empire
- Allegiance: Holy Roman Empire; Electorate of Bavaria
- Service years: 1632 – 1659
- Rank: Generalfeldmarschall
- Conflicts: Thirty Years' War: Battle of Lützen (1632); Battle of Rheinfelden (1638) (POW); Battle of Breitenfeld (1642); Battle of Jüterbog (1644) (POW); Siege of Weißenburg in Bayern (1647); Siege of Memmingen (1647); Battle of Dachau (1648); Franco-Spanish War (1635–59)

Adrian von Enkevort (20 August 1603 – 3 June 1663) was a Brabantine nobleman and Generalfeldmarschall who fought during the course of the Thirty Years' War and the Franco-Spanish War (1635–59). He followed his father's footsteps becoming an officer, his first success came in 1632 when he distinguished himself at the Battle of Lützen in the forces of the Holy Roman Empire. He was later sent to the Rhine front where he assisted Charles of Lorraine in reclaiming his lost realm. After a short spell in the Spanish invasion of Picardy, he returned to the Rhine where he was captured by the French, spending three years in captivity. Upon his return in 1641, he was promoted to Generalfeldmarschall and dispatched to Germany where he campaigned extensively. In 1648, he became the supreme commander of the Bavarian forces, serving in this capacity until the end of the war.

== Biography ==
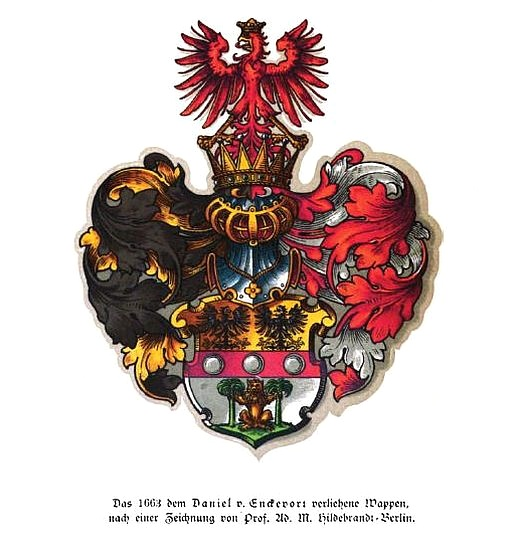
Enkevort's coat of arms.

Adrian was born in 1603 to Wilhelm von Enkevort, a member of the Enckevort noble family, originating in the Duchy of Brabant. Adrian followed his father's footsteps entering the service of the Electoral Bavarian army. He later joined the allied forces of the Imperial Army, serving under generalissimo Albrecht von Wallenstein. During the course of the Thirty Years' War, Enkevort distinguished himself at the Battle of Lützen (1632). He represented the Holy Roman Empire in the course of its negotiations with Bernard of Saxe-Weimar, later joining one of Adam Erdmann Trčka von Lípa's infantry regiments in the rank of Oberstleutnant. He appears to have not been affected by an internal purge which resulted in the assassination of Wallenstein and Trčka and the subsequent persecution of their close associates. In July 1635, he was promoted to the rank of colonel and dispatched to Breisach where he joined Charles of Lorraine's campaign to reconquer his duchy from the French and the Bernhardines. In October, after an initial success the Imperial-Bavarian army operating in the region was decimated by an outbreak of Hungarian spotted fever. In 1636, Enkevort was promoted to Generalwachtmeister and sent to the north where he fought under general Ottavio Piccolomini, fighting the French in the Spanish Netherlands and Picardy as part of the Franco-Spanish War (1635–59). Enkevort fought side by side with Johann von Werth, their friendship eased the tensions between the Bavarian and Imperial armies. In October 1637, Enkevort returned to the Rhineland where the Imperialists and their Bavarian allies pushed Bernhard out of his last stronghold in Alsace.

In early 1638, Bernhard launched an unexpected counter offensive, besieging Rheinfelden. Werth and Federico Savelli collected 2,600 infantry and 4,500 cavalry from the surrounding garrisons, rushing to relieve Rheinfelden. On 28 February, the advance of the Imperialists was blocked by Bernhard's cavalry pickets outside of Beuggen, they then headed towards the west in an attempt to deploy their forces in a more favorable position. The Bavarian cavalry which had reached Karsau ahead of the rest of the army, was attacked and thrown back. Savelli arrived with the infantry in time to support the Bavarians and force Bernhard to retreat towards Bad Säckingen. Lack of any sort of pursuit allowed Bernhard to regroup in Lauffenberg, 14 kilometres (8.7 mi) upstream, where he received reinforcements from the other side of the Rhine. At 7:00 a.m. on 3 March, the Imperialist scouts became aware of the enemy presence at Lauffenberg. Before they were able to fully deploy, the Bernhardines fired a musket salvo at half range accompanied by cannon fire. The Imperial and Liga infantry was still reloading their muskets when the Bernhardines charged. The Imperial infantry broke formation, engaging in a disorganized retreat, so did the cavalry. Werth's elite infantry regiment was the only one to resist until it was surrounded and forced to surrender. The Battle of Rheinfelden was disastrous, Werth, Enkevort, general Sperreuter and Savelli were captured along with 3,000 of their men, while 500 were killed. Savelli escaped soon afterwards, after the woman tasked with bringing him food freed him instead. Enkevort spent the next three years in Paris, in relative comfort, even attending society events.

== Return from Captivity ==
Enkevort was exchanged for a captured Swedish general in 1641, upon his return he was promoted to Generalfeldmarschall by Archduke Leopold Wilhelm of Austria. He then campaigned in Thuringia, between the areas of Aller and Leine. In the spring of 1642, he was transferred to the troops of Charles of Lorraine on the left side of the Rhine, although this front saw no major battles prompting his return to Bohemia. Under Leopold Wilhelm, he moved to Saxony, where the Imperial suffered a defeat at the hands of the Swedes in the Second Battle of Breitenfeld. In 1643, the new Imperial supreme commander Matthias Gallas made Enkevort and Johann Wilhelm von Hunolstein part of his General Staff. The revolt of Transylvanian prince George Rákóczi I and his subsequent invasion of Bohemia tied Enkevort's troops there until June 1644, when the Imperials under Gallas began their march on Schleswig. In August, Lennart Torstenson's army was joined by another Swedish army under Hans Christoff von Königsmarck; their combined force chased the Imperials back south. The two armies surrounded Gallas' army in Magdeburg; by November, the army was virtually shattered. Trying to escape with the cavalry, Enkevort was captured for a second time at Jüterbog.

Upon his release, he became military governor of the Austrian provinces of Tyrol and Vorarlberg; in early 1647 he commanded troops in Swabia. In September, Enkevort besieged the Swedish held city of Memmingen, taking it on 23 November; several smaller towns in Swabia and Franconia followed. He later traveled to Bohemia, Thuringia, Hesse and then back to Swabia on various assignments, one of which was the creation of a gunboat flotilla which challenged the Swedes on Lake Constance. He was not present at the Battle of Zusmarshausen which took place on 17 May. Citing Jost Maximilian von Bronckhorst-Gronsfeld's poor performance after the battle, Maximilian I, Elector of Bavaria offered Enkevort the command of the Bavarian forces. Enkevort assumed office on 2 August from the interim commander Hunolstein and managed to defeat the Franco-Swedish army at the Battle of Dachau in October with the help of the Imperial cavalry under Johann von Werth, his last operation in the war.

Following the end of the war he took part in the demobilization of Bavarian and Imperial troops, receiving the sum of 3,000 Goldguldens and the title of Graf for his service. In the meantime the Franco-Spanish War continued and Enkevort was sent to the Italian front of operations at the head of the Imperial troops. Enkevort's troops did not engage in any major operations and he returned to Vienna after the two sides signed the Treaty of the Pyrenees. He died in Vienna in 1663, it is known that he was the son-in-law of the Imperial chancellor Count of Werdenberg.
