= Gallas =

Gallas may refer to:

Gallas is a Dutch surname, and it either derived from the Celtic word Gallus 'stranger', or a plural for Gaul. A name describing the people who lived in Gallia Belgica.

- Matthias Gallas, an Austrian soldier
- Johann Wenzel von Gallas, an Austrian diplomatist
- William Gallas, a French footballer
- The Oromo people, an ethnic group in Ethiopia also known as Gallas
