= Battle of Preßnitz =

1641 battle of the Thirty Years' War

- Part of the Thirty Years' War
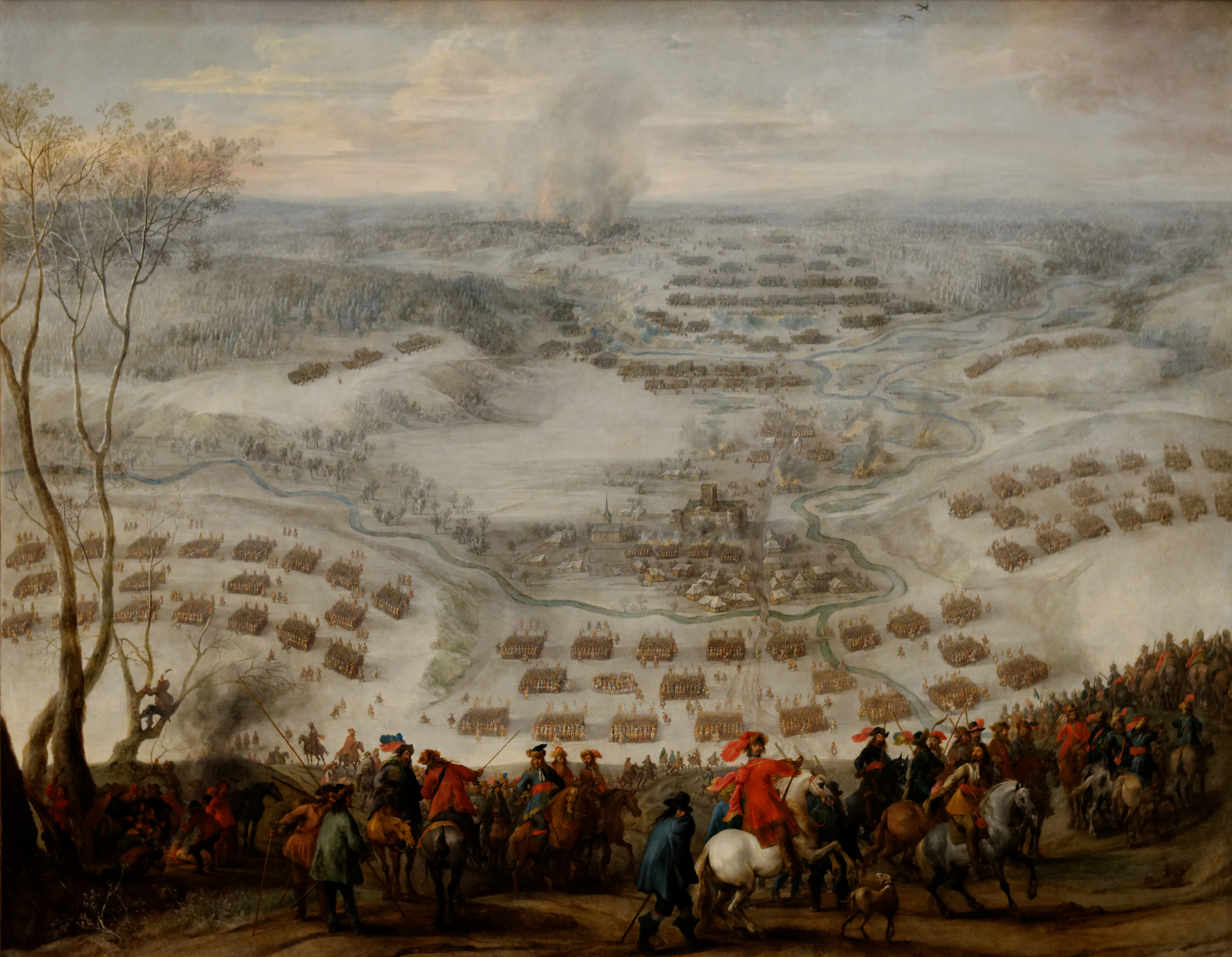
- Der Posto bei Presnitz, 1641 by Pieter Snayers. Portrait of the battle between Swedish and Imperial troops
Date	27 March 1641
Location	Preßnitz (now Přísečnice) 50°28′N 13°08′E
Result	Imperial victory

Belligerents
Holy Roman Empire	Swedish Empire

Commanders and leaders
(Holy Roman Empire) Ottavio Piccolomini	(Swedish Empire) Johan Banér

Strength
Unknown	14,000

Casualties and losses
Unknown	4,000
- Location within Czech Republic Battle of Preßnitz (Saxony) Battle of Preßnitz (Germany)

The Battle of Preßnitz (German: Schlacht bei Preßnitz) was a military engagement fought on 27 March [O.S. 17 March] 1641 during the Thirty Years' War. In the battle, Imperial troops under Octavio Piccolomini defeated the Swedish army under Field Marshal Johan Baner.

== Course of the battle ==
In preparation for the campaign against Regensburg, Swedish troops under Johan Baner made their winter quarters in 1640/1641 in the Upper Palatinate at Cham near the Bohemian border, with the aim of joining forces with the regiments of the French commander, Jean Baptiste Budes de Guébriant. At that time, only the Swedish troops were used to winter campaigning. On 17 March, Baner's camp was attacked by Imperial troops and his army, which was clearly outnumbered and weakened by casualties, became almost surrounded. Baner was forced to beat a hasty retreat to Saxony using the shorter route via Bohemian soil, pursued by Imperial cavalry regiments.

On 27 March Baner's men pulled out of Kaaden in the Ore Mountains heading for the little town of Preßnitz. Piccolomini sought to pre-empt Baner's move by taking a shorter, but more difficult route across the crest of the Ore Mountains to occupy the Preßnitz passes in the Bohemian Forest, but he was half-an-hour too late. On reaching the vicinity of the town, a heavy rearguard action broke out that lasted until midnight. Meanwhile, Banér's troops secured their withdrawal using the deep forests north and south of Preßnitz and even built a wagon fort, from which they engaged the Imperial troops with artillery. Covered by this makeshift fort, the Swedes withdrew to Annaberg. The Swedish infantry, covered by the cannon behind the wagon fort, had an advantage over the heavy imperial cavalry in the thickly snow-covered and muddy terrain, but their opponent's superiority in numbers proved too much. Baner lost about 4,000 men, almost a third of his strength. However, the Swedish army escaped a total defeat and eventually made it from Annaberg to Zwickau. Shortly after this battle, Banér died in a camp near Halberstadt on 10 May 1641, aged 45.
