= Matthias Gallas =

Italian-Austrian nobleman and professional soldier

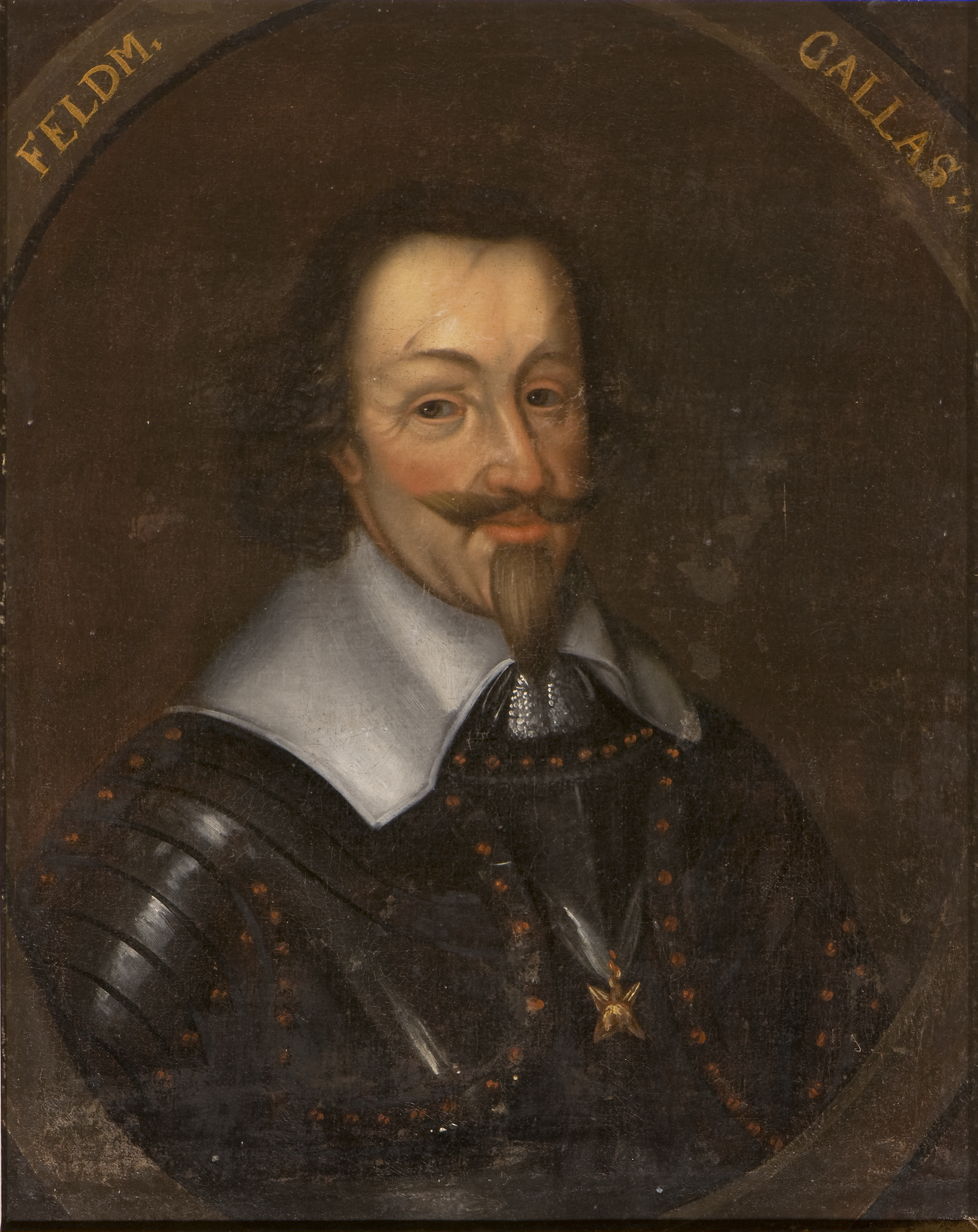
- Matthias Gallas, Graf von Campo, Herzog von Lucera
- Born: 17 October 1588; Trento, Prince-Bishopric of Trent
- Died: 25 April 1647 (aged 58); Vienna, Austria
- Spouse(s): Isabella of Arco († 1632), Dorothea Anna von Lodron († 1666)
- Military career
- Allegiance: Holy Roman Empire
- Rank: Generalfeldmarschall
- Conflicts: War of the Mantuan Succession: Battle of Villabuona (1630); Sack of Mantua (1630); Thirty Years' War: Battle of Stadtlohn (1623); Battle of the Alte Veste (1632); Siege of Regensburg (1634); Battle of Nördlingen (1634); Capture of Worms (1635); Capture of Kaiserslautern (1635); Siege of Mainz (1635); Siege of Saint-Jean-de-Losne (1636); Siege of Prague (1639); Capture of Kiel (1644)

Matthias Gallas, Graf von Campo und Herzog von Lucera (Mattia Gallasso; 17 October 1588 in Trento – 25 April 1647 in Vienna) was an Italian professional soldier during the Thirty Years' War. He distinguished himself in the first half of the war in service of the Catholic League, in the War of the Mantuan Succession, and as one of Albrecht von Wallenstein's Generals. After carrying out the dismissal and elimination of Wallenstein, Gallas became acting supreme commander of the Imperial Army three times between 1634 and 1647 but he never held the function or authority of a Generalissimo.

He was a principal architect of the victory of Nördlingen 1634 but his following campaigns were less successful. After leading ineffective offensives against France, he managed to end Swedish attacks on Saxony and to drive them back to the Baltic coast in 1637. Unable to eliminate them or sustain his own forces in the devastated Pomerania, Gallas retreated with his shrunken army in 1638. Because he was unable to stop the following Swedish advance, he lost his command for the first time.

Called back in 1643 to stop Lennart Torstensson who soon retreated to attack Denmark, Gallas was ordered to follow him and to support the Danes. This ended in Gallas' most disastrous campaign in which he was outmaneuvered and encircled by the Swedes, who cut him off from his supplies in late 1644. Having lost almost his entire army, he was again relieved from command, only to return to advise and support Archduke Leopold Wilhelm in defending the Erblande against Sweden. Once again, he replaced the Archduke as supreme commander in 1647 but died soon afterwards after suffering many years from ill health.

== Biography ==
=== Early career ===
Gallas started his career first as page and then as cavalryman in service of Ferdinando Madruzzo, a brother of the Prince-Bishop of Trento Carlo Gaudenzio Madruzzo. He most likely fought as Spanish mercenary in Flanders. Thereafter, he fought as Fähnrich and Lieutenant under the Tyrolean Obristfeldhauptmann Giannangelo Madruzzo for Spain against Savoy. In 1616, Gallas participated at the Spanish siege of Vercelli in Piedmont. Following Giannangelo's death in December 1618, Gallas was designated to succeed him as commander of the fortress Riva. He became Captain and commanded the fortress until January 1621. In this year, Gallas joined the forces of the Catholic League and entered the Thirty Years' War as Obristwachtmeister and commander of an infantry regiment. He was second officer to Count Anholt and distinguished himself, especially at the battle of Stadtlohn (1623). After being promoted to colonel in 1625 and made Reichsfreiherr in 1627, the League president and Bavarian Elector Maximilian denied him further promotion, leading to Gallas' change into Imperial service in early 1629.

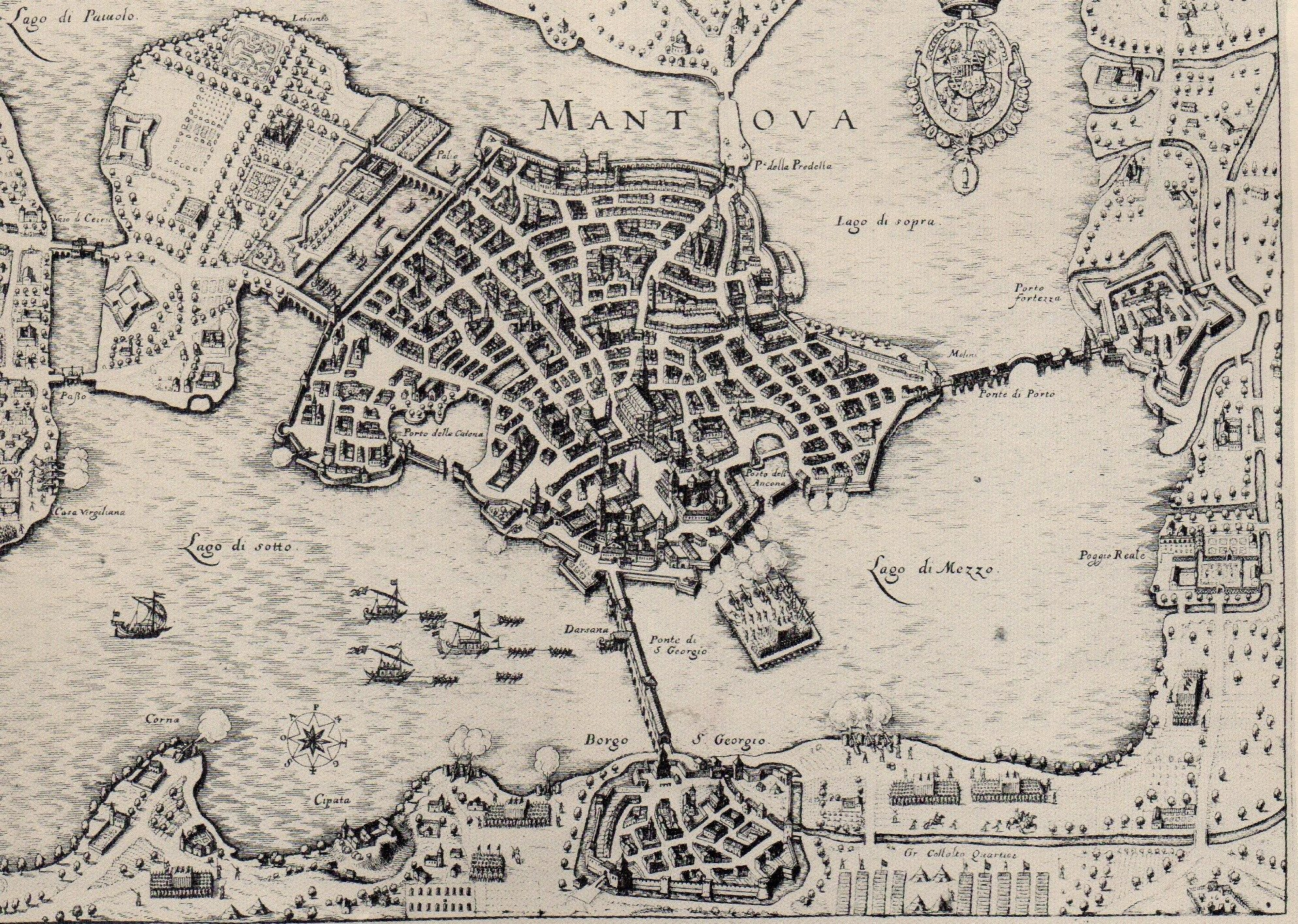
Gallas' first independent command led to the capture and infamous sack of Mantua

Since 1629, he was serving as Generalfeldwachtmeister under Count Collalto in the War of Mantuan succession. When Collalto fell sick, command of the Imperial army devolved to his deputies, Gallas and Johann von Aldringen.

On 29 May 1630, Gallas successfully defeated a 17,000 strong Franco-Venetian relief army led by the French general Duc de Candale and the Venetian provveditore Zaccaria Sagredo at the battle of Villabuona. His complete victory at Villabuona ensured the fall of Mantua, and on 18 July Imperial troops under his command captured and then brutally sacked the city. Only the churches and the ghetto were spared, but the latter solely to expel the Jewish population and to plunder it nine days later. The expulsion was later rescinded by the Imperial court, and on 18 October the surviving Jewish population of Mantua was allowed to return. Gallas stayed in Italy to negotiate the Treaty of Cherasco in which he managed to prevent the demilitarisation of the Valtellina that remained under Imperial control.

Made Imperial Count for the capture of Mantua and the negotiations at Cherasco, he returned to Germany for the campaign against the invading swedish king Gustavus Adolphus and his Saxon allies in late 1631. Gallas was appointed to Feldzeugmeister and assumed command over a corps of Wallenstein's army. Over the winter, he recovered parts of Bohemia from Saxon occupation. Wallenstein's army recaptured Prague and subsequently turned to Bavaria to face the Swedish army in 1632. Gallas' corps served at the Battle of the Alte Veste near Nuremberg against the Swedish King. After the battle, Gallas was promoted to Field Marshal. Wallenstein sent him to Silesia prior to the Battle of Lützen and called him back too late, so that he did not arrive in time to participate. On a proposal from Wallenstein, Emperor Ferdinand II appointed Gallas to Generalleutnant, second-in-command to the Generalissimo. Over the year 1633, he commanded in Silesia.

When Wallenstein's repeated disobedience and unauthorized negotiations with Saxony strengthened the court's mistrust of him, the Imperial counselor Wolkenstein contacted Gallas to check his loyalty and to introduce him to plans to depose Wallenstein. Initially skeptical of the plans, he unsuccessfully tried to change Wallenstein's mind. He was made provisional supreme commander until the Emperor's son Ferdinand of Hungary took command.

After he was informed of the Emperor's decision to arrest or kill Wallenstein, Gallas left the army's headquarters in Pilsen on 12 February 1634 to plan the execution. He declared the orders of Wallenstein, Adam Erdmann Trčka von Lípa and Christian von Ilow invalid and secured the loyalty of the troops while Wallenstein fled to Eger where he was assassinated. Gallas was rewarded with the vast majority of the former Duchy of Friedland.

=== Generalleutnant and Imperial commander ===
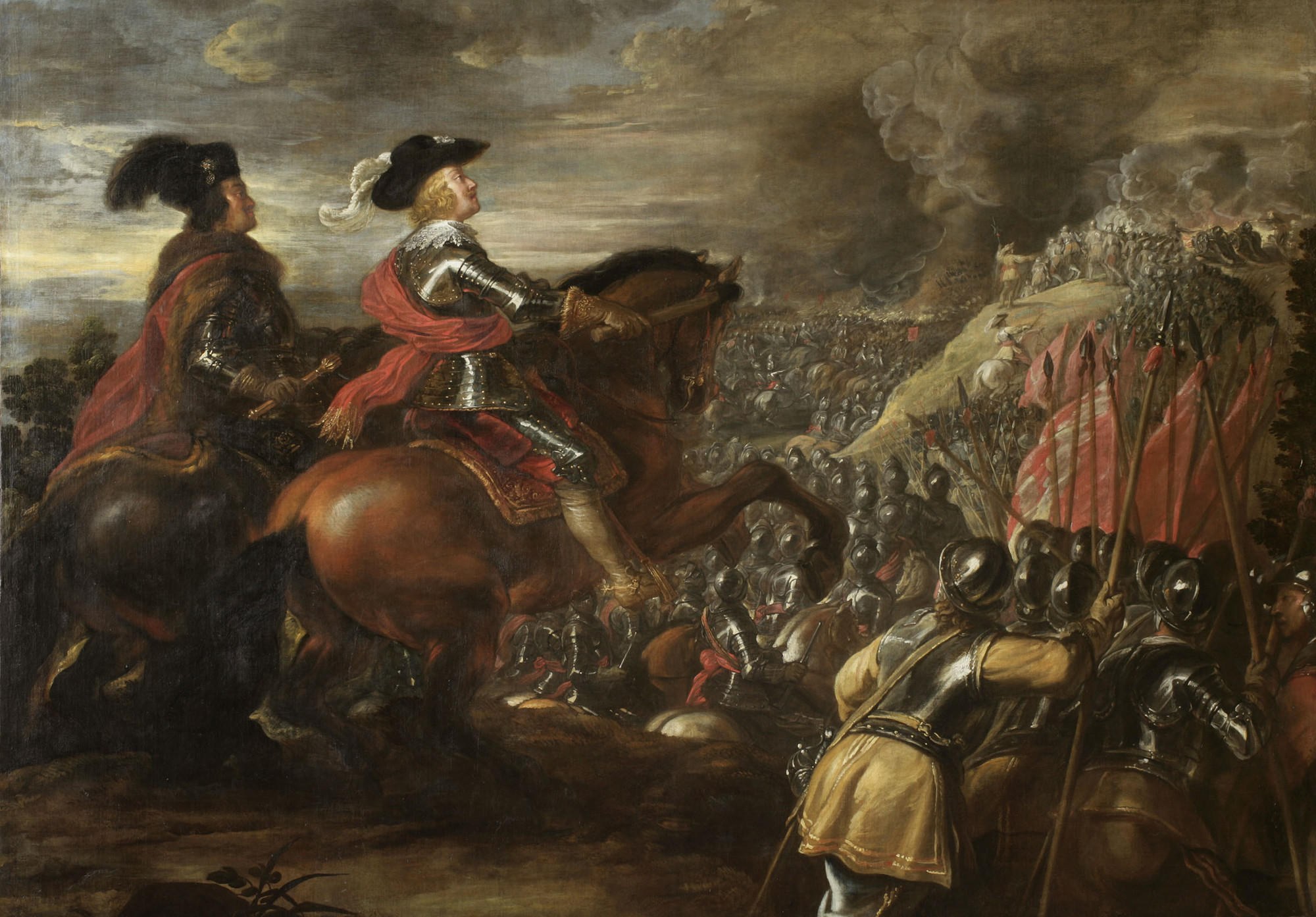
Gallas' greatest success, the Battle of Nördlingen 1634

In the next campaign, Gallas was the actual commander as chief advisor to the inexperienced Ferdinand of Hungary. Their plan was to regain Regensburg and to link up with a Spanish army under the Cardinal-Infante. The Imperials captured Regensburg on 26 July, followed by Donauwörth on 16 August. They proceeded to besiege Nördlingen where the Spanish army joined their forces. A numerically inferior Swedish force under Gustav Horn and Bernhard of Saxe-Weimar tried to lift the siege and attacked them on 5 September but Gallas directed the united Habsburg army to a resounding victory in the Battle of Nördlingen. The Swedes lost two armies and the control over southern Germany while the Imperials chased them up to the Main before moving into winter quarters in Württemberg.

The attention of the Imperials turned to the Rhine in 1635. After the open outbreak of hostilities with France, Gallas and his troops crossed the river at the recently captured Philippsburg in May. He captured most of the Palatinate with Kaiserslautern as well as Worms and started to besiege Mainz in summer. At the approach of a French-Weimar relief force under Bernhard and Cardinal La Valette, Gallas retreated to harass them with light cavalry and to cut off their supplies. This proved successful, most of the French army perished because of sickness or hunger, or it dissolved on its retreat to Metz. The siege of Mainz was renewed and successfully concluded in December while Gallas advanced via Saarbrücken into Lorraine. He joined forces at Dieuze with the exiled Duke of Lorraine who urged to recapture his capital Nancy. Yet Gallas preferred to entrench his army at the Seille to give his troops some rest. An outbreak of the plague and shortage of supplies forced him to retreat into Alsace where he set up winter quarters at Saverne.

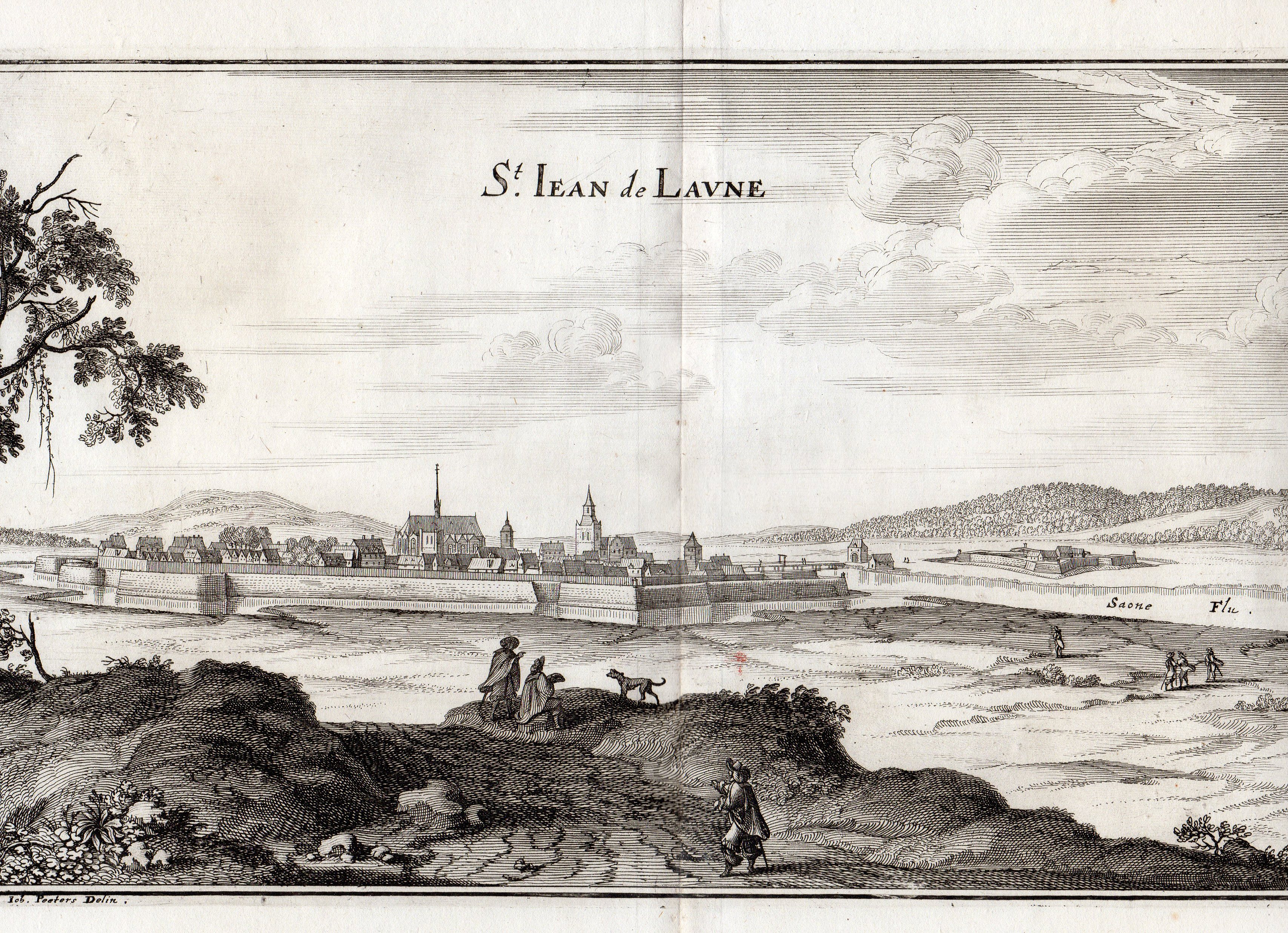
Saint-Jean-de-Losne where Gallas' invasion of Burgundy ended in 1636

For 1636, Ferdinand of Hungary had convinced the Cardinal-Infante to invade France from the north in an attempt to end the war. Gallas was ordered to lead a separate southern invasion into Burgundy to support Spain. Despite Gallas' reluctance to initiate offensive campaigns, he collected his troops in Breisach and marched via the Belfort Gap into the Franche-Comté. French troops had invaded this Habsburg territory in May and were besieging the capital Dole. Gallas sent his vanguard under Guillaume de Lamboy and the Duke of Lorraine ahead; they relieved Dole in August. His main force encamped at Champlitte where it was confronted by a French army under Bernhard of Saxe-Weimar and La Valette in September. Unwilling to attack the French head-on, Gallas broke up his camp after several weeks and marched on Dijon. After capturing the castle of Mirebeau-sur-Bèze on 24 October, he was again hesitant to advance further and decided to lay siege to Saint-Jean-de-Losne to secure its strategic bridge for supplies or a possible retreat. However, the small town resisted all Imperial attacks until French reinforcements and heavy rain forced Gallas to abandon the siege and the overall invasion in early November.

After being sent to northern Germany with his army in 1637, Gallas was more successful at stopping the advance of the Swedish general Johan Banér. He almost encircled the Swedes at Torgau with superior numbers in June but Banér escaped by sacrificing parts of his baggage. In a pursuit up to Pomerania, Gallas was faster than Banér and blocked his way at Landsberg. Banér barely rescued his army by deceiving the Imperials into thinking that he would violate Polish neutrality and evacuate his army over their territory. However, he only sent his remaining baggage over the Polish border, while his troops moved westwards across the Oder. Gallas trapped him at the coastline and raised a cordon along the Peene river, taking all strongholds except the most heavily fortified, such as Stralsund or Stettin. The Swedes apparently showed readiness for peace, as their main army was locked in a few fortresses on the Baltic Sea. The new Emperor Ferdinand III was willing to compromise but the Swedish Chancellor Axel Oxenstierna eventually used his offers just to improve the French contributions in the Treaty of Hamburg in March 1638.

During 1638, Gallas' situation strongly deteriorated; while Banér received fresh reinforcements from Sweden, Gallas gained only insignificant support from his allies Brandenburg-Prussia and Saxony. In October 1638, Banér broke through Gallas' cordon and reconquered Mecklenburg. The Imperials were unable to sustain their army in the devastated area any longer and first retreated across the Elbe, then to Silesia, plundering and partially dissolving in the progress. After Gallas' retreat, Banér pushed into Saxony, defeating the Saxon army at Chemnitz in April 1639. The Swedes advanced even further entering Bohemia in May as the first enemy since 1634. At first left in command, Gallas focused on defending Prague against Swedish siege attempts. Unable to expel the Swedes from Bohemia and confronted with declining army morale and discipline, Gallas was replaced by Archduke Leopold Wilhelm in September. The emperor wanted Gallas to stay as counselor in Vienna, but he chose to return to Trento and to administer his various possessions for the next few years.

=== Return as commander ===
In March 1643, Gallas returned to succeed the Archduke and the interim commander Piccolomini who both resigned following their defeat at Breitenfeld. Gallas anticipated the march of the Swedes under Lennart Torstensson from Saxony to Moravia and tried to block his way with a defensive position at Hradec Králové as well as denying the Swedes any crossing of the Elbe. However, Torstensson feinted an attack at Brandeis while gaining a crossing at Mělník. This allowed Torstensson to reach Moravia and resupply the occupied Olomouc. Gallas followed him over Brno and again took a strong defensive position in front of Torstensson. Instead of seeking battle, Gallas harassed him in skirmishes with the superior Imperial light cavalry and sent a diversion under Krockow to Pomerania. At the end of the year, the Swedes surprisingly left to attack Denmark in what became the Torstenson War.

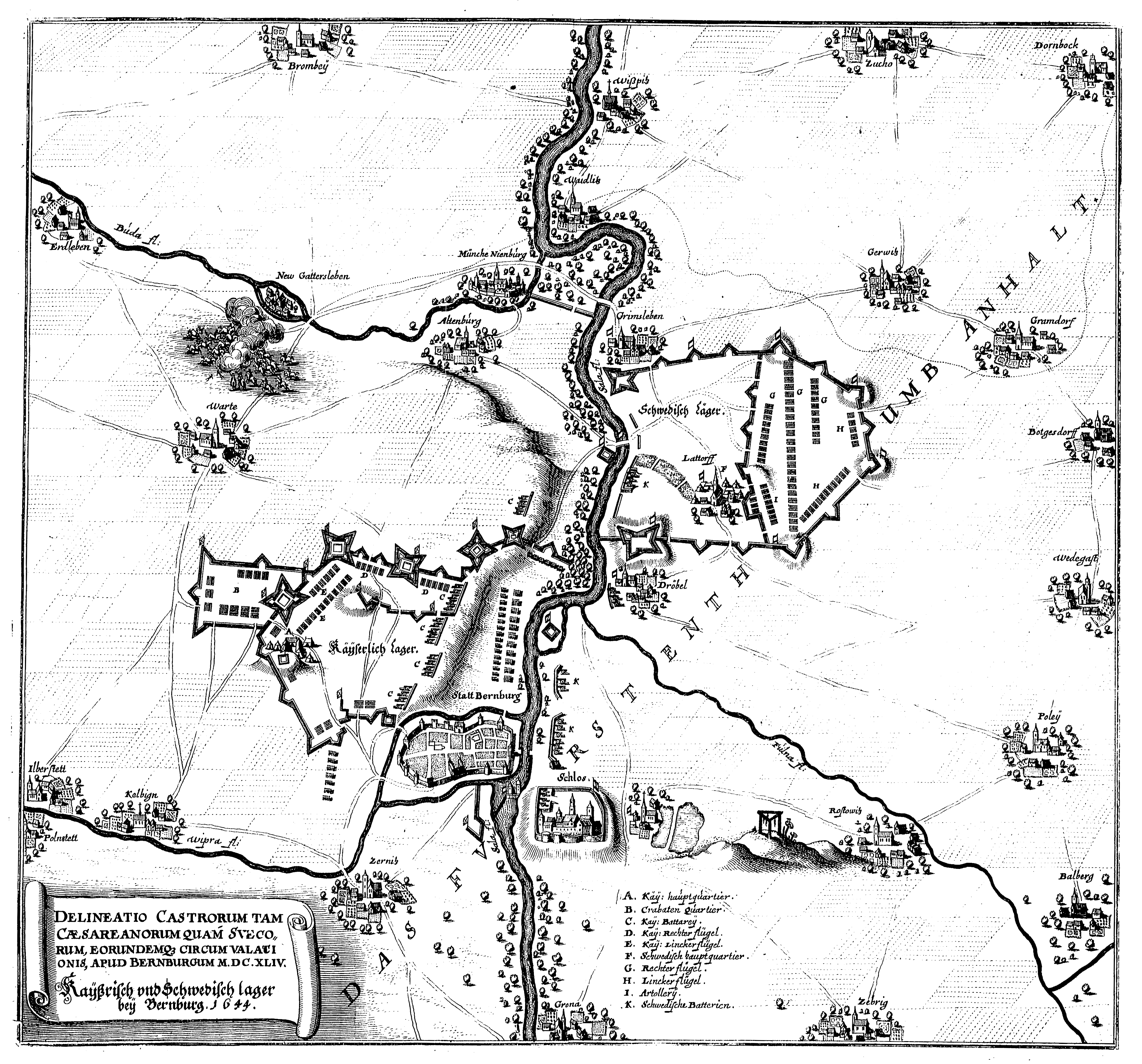
Swedish and Imperial camps at Bernburg 1644 where the Swedes encircled Gallas' troops

In the next year, Gallas was ordered to march to Holstein to Denmark's aid. Being himself very skeptical about the prospects of this campaign, he delayed his departure until May and slowly moved up to Kiel that he recaptured from Sweden in August. The Swedish fleet had been trapped in the Bay of Kiel after the Battle of Colberger Heide but Gallas arrived a few days too late to bombard it from land. Torstensson was already in control of Jutland and bypassed Gallas' army after a short confrontation at the Eider to threaten their supply lines. Gallas was forced to retreat back to Bernburg where Torstensson's superior cavalry supported by Hans Christoff von Königsmarck fully encircled the Imperials and denied them any supplies. By deceiving Torstensson to attack a small decoy force, Gallas was able to escape to Magdeburg in November where the pattern repeated itself. His army been shrunken by hunger, sickness and desertion, and himself fallen ill, Gallas ordered his troops to break out. The cavalry under Adrian von Enkevort and Raimondo Montecuccoli was caught by the Swedes at Jüterbog and only partly escaped, the small remaining portion of infantry under Johann Wilhelm von Hunolstein safely reached Bohemia in early February 1645.

Gallas himself stayed with the diseased soldiers in Magdeburg and only returned to Prague in late February. His command was given to Melchior von Hatzfeldt who lost and was captured at Jankau in March. The slightly recovered Gallas was again recalled to assist the new Generalissimo Leopold Wilhelm as his deputy. He collected the dispersed Imperial troops in Bohemia and organised the defence of the kingdom whereas Archduke Leopold Wilhelm held the Danube. The Bavarian defeat by France at Second Nördlingen in August made an Imperial diversion necessary to help them out. Both Gallas and the Archduke moved to Bavaria and repulsed the French army back to the Rhine while the defence of the Danube was left to three army corps under Puchheim, Hunolstein and Annibale Gonzaga. When Gallas' health and his relationship to the Archduke strongly declined at the end of the year, he left his office again.

Feeling somewhat more in health, Gallas was asked to replace the Archduke as supreme commander in December 1646. Despite arguing for Piccolomini instead of him, Gallas agreed. Soon, he was again afflicted by gout and fever. Too ill to lead another campaign, he restricted his efforts to conserve the Imperial army through the winter. The war-weary Gallas could not prevent the Bavarian Elector Maximilian from signing the Truce of Ulm with France and Sweden in March 1647; he even admitted that Maximilian was doing the right thing. The emperor recalled Gallas to Vienna in late March, his command was transferred to Count Holzappel on 17 April. Gallas died eight days later due to a failed surgery.

== Assessment ==
The successes of Gallas' early career were not matched by his achievements after 1634. He was a general that never lost a major battle because he did not lead his army into any after Nördlingen. Unwilling to risk his army in pitched battle, Gallas still could not prevent the ruin of his armies in various campaigns because of lack of supplies. He often complained about the unsustainable conditions but still obediently followed the orders of the emperor. After his disastrous campaigns of 1638 and 1644, he became even known as the “destroyer of armies” - originating from French and Swedish war propaganda, it evolved into a lasting nickname.

According to his biographer Rebitsch, Gallas was an able and wily tactician who most excelled in the defence but often lacked the determination and risk appetite in the offensive. He was competent in the operational planning of his campaigns but more and more overstrained in their execution under the increasingly difficult external conditions of the later Thirty Years' War. Gallas therefore stood in contrast to, for example, Torstensson or Piccolomini, as not among those commanders who could adequately adapt to these altered conditions.

== Family ==
Gallas first married Countess Isabella of Arco in 1630 in a double marriage with his colleague Johann von Aldringen who married Isabella's sister Livia. After the death of his first wife in 1632, Gallas remarried two years later to Countess Dorothea Anna Maria von Lodron-Laterano (1619-1666), daughter of Count Philipp von Lodron-Laterano (1596-1671) and a relative to Salzburg's Prince-Bishop Paris von Lodron. Together, they had at least seven children, of which Franz Ferdinand (1635–1697), Theresia Annunziata Francesca († 1667), Anton Pankraz (1638–1695) and Maria Viktoria (1639–1687) survived their childhood. After the death of her husband, Dorothea married Prince Ferdinand Johann von und zu Liechtenstein (1622-1666). The most remarkable descendant of Gallas was his grandson Johann Wenzel von Gallas (1669–1719), a diplomat and Austrian Viceroy of Naples.

After the death of the last male Gallas in 1757, Johann Wenzel's son Philipp Josef, the heir Christian Philipp von Clam took the name Clam-Gallas, a family which provided many reputable soldiers to the Imperial army.

== Possessions ==
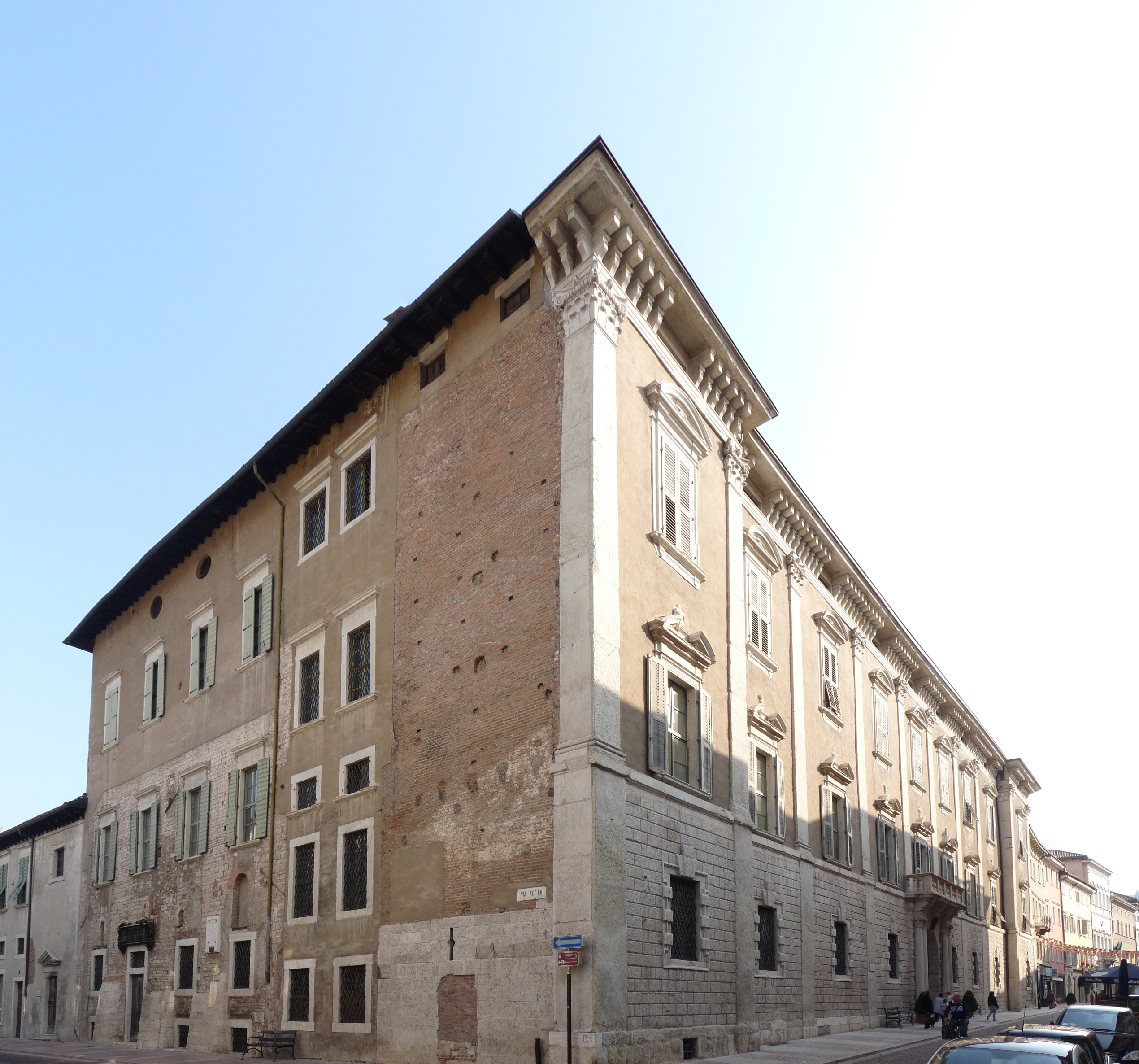
Palazzo Galasso in Trento

Despite holding the title Count of Campo, Gallas never possessed the eponymous Castle Campo near Fiavé that his family had lost many generations before. From his pay as soldier and officer, he purchased the first pieces of land prior to 1621, followed by a house in Trento in 1623 and a mansion in Mattarello in 1628. In 1632 or 1642, he bought the Palazzo Fugger in Trento, afterwards known as Palazzo Galasso.

His loyalty to the Habsburgs during Wallenstein's dismissal in early 1634 brought Gallas as highest-ranking executor the majority of the Generalissimo's property in the Bohemian Duchy of Friedland with Frýdlant and Liberec but without the capital Jičín. From Adam Trčka's possessions, the dominion of Smiřice was given to Gallas. In northern Italy, he purchased Castle Freyenthurn (Italian: Torre Franca) in Mattarello and most of the surrounding village from 1634 to 1636.

On 22 August 1635, Gallas was made Duke of Lucera by King Philip IV of Spain. The title was linked to a territory in the Kingdom of Naples. Gallas himself did not use the title in documents or correspondence.

== Sources ==
- Chisholm, Hugh, ed. (1911). "Gallas, Matthias" . Encyclopædia Britannica. Vol. 11 (11th ed.). Cambridge University Press. p. 413.
- Curti, F. (1889). Compendio deli Assedi e Blocchi di Mantova con relative note dal sua fondazione a giorni nostri (in Italian). Mondoví: Stabilimento Litografico-Tipografico.
- Guthrie, William P. (2003). The Later Thirty Years War: From the Battle of Wittstock to the Treaty of Westphalia. Greenwood Press. ISBN 9780313324086.
- Höbelt, Lothar (2016). Von Nördlingen bis Jankau: Kaiserliche Strategie und Kriegsführung 1634-1645 (in German). Wien: Heeresgeschichtliches Museum. ISBN 978-3902551733.
- Rebitsch, Robert (2006). Matthias Gallas (1588–1647). Generalleutnant des Kaisers zur Zeit des Dreißigjährigen Krieges. Eine militärische Biographie (in German). Münster: Aschendorff Verlag. ISBN 978-3-402065761.
- Rößler, Hellmuth (1964). "Gallas, Matthias". Neue Deutsche Biographie (in German). Vol. 6. Berlin: Duncker & Humblot. pp. 46–47. (full text online).
- Wilson, Peter H. (2009). Europe's Tragedy: A History of the Thirty Years War. Allen Lane. ISBN 978-0-7139-9592-3.
