= Raimondo Montecuccoli =

Italian soldier and military theorist (1609–1680)

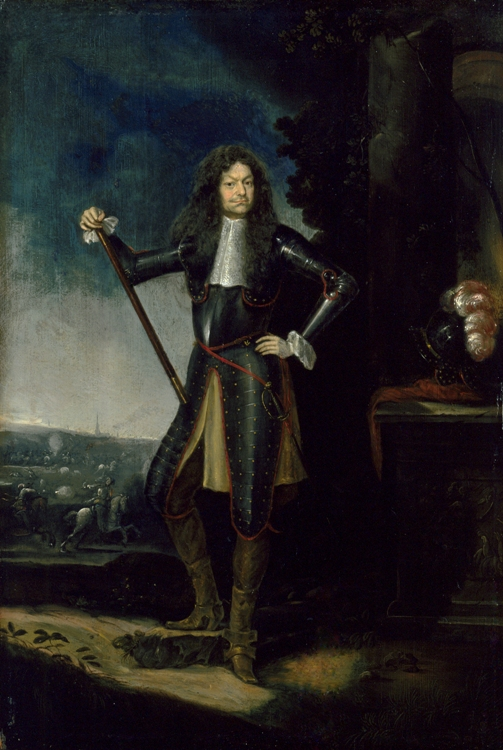
- Portrait by Elias Grießler, c. 1650
- Born: 21 February 1609; Pavullo nel Frignano, Duchy of Modena and Reggio
- Died: 16 October 1680 (aged 71); Linz, Archduchy of Austria
- Burial place: Vienna
- Spouse: Maria Margareta of Dietrichstein
- Military career
- Allegiance: Holy Roman Empire
- Branch: Imperial Army
- Service years: 1625–1675
- Rank: Generalfeldmarschall
- Conflicts: See list: Thirty Years' War; Battle of Breitenfeld (POW); Battle of Lützen (WIA); Battle of Nördlingen; Battle of Wittstock; Battle of Chemnitz; Battle of Melnik (POW); Battle of Jüterbog; Battle of Triebl; Battle of Zusmarshausen; Battle of Dachau; First War of Castro; Second Northern War; Dano-Swedish War (1658–1660); Montecuccoli's landing on Funen; Austro-Turkish War; Battle of Saint Gotthard; Franco-Dutch War; Siege of Bonn; Rhineland Campaign; Battle of Salzbach; Battle of Altenheim
- Awards: Order of the Golden Fleece

Signature
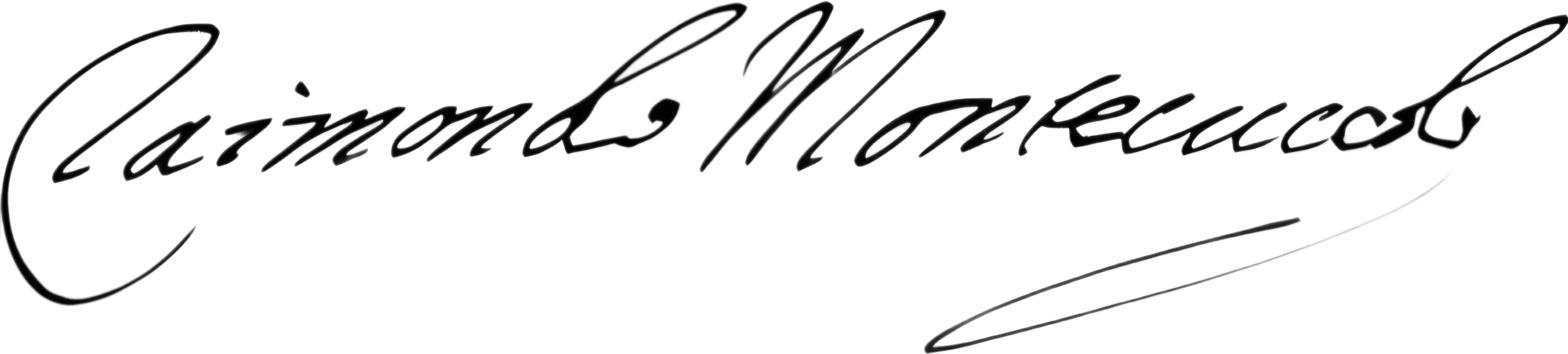

Raimondo Montecuccoli (Italian pronunciation: [raiˈmondo monteˈkukkoli]; 21 February 1609 – 16 October 1680) was an Italian-born professional soldier, military theorist, and diplomat, who served the Habsburg monarchy. His military exploits over his five-decade career earned him a reputation as one of the greatest military commanders in history. He is also regarded as the most distinguished military thinker of the early modern period.

Experiencing the Thirty Years' War from scratch as a simple footsoldier, he rose through the ranks into a regiment holder and became an important cavalry commander in the late stages. Serving the Habsburgs as war counsellor and envoy, he commanded their troops in the Second Northern War and the Austro-Turkish War of 1663–64 where he scored an impressive victory in the Battle of Saint Gotthard. Afterwards, he became president of the Hofkriegsrat and briefly returned as supreme commander of the Imperial forces during the Franco-Dutch War.

Montecuccoli was considered the only commander able to compete with the French general Turenne (1611–1675), and like him, was closely associated with the post-1648 development of linear infantry tactics.

== Early life ==
Montecuccoli was born on 21 February 1609 in the Castello di Montecuccolo in Pavullo nel Frignano, near Modena.

== Early military service ==
At the age of sixteen, Montecuccoli began as a private soldier under his uncle, Count Ernesto Montecuccoli (died 1633), a distinguished Austrian general. Four years later, after much active service in Germany and the Low Countries, he became a captain of infantry. He was severely wounded at the storming of New Brandenburg, and again in the same year (1631) at the first battle of Breitenfeld, where he fell into the hands of the Swedes.

He was again wounded at Lützen in 1632, and on his recovery was made a major in his uncle's regiment. Shortly afterwards he became a lieutenant-colonel of cavalry. He did good service at the first battle of Nordlingen (1634), and at the storming of Kaiserslautern in the following year won his colonelcy by a feat of arms of unusual brilliance, a charge through the breach at the head of his heavy cavalry.

He fought in Pomerania, Bohemia and Saxony (surprise of Wolmirstedt, battles of Wittstock and Chemnitz), and in 1639 he was taken prisoner at Melnik and detained for two and a half years in Stettin and Weimar. In captivity he studied military science, and also geometry by the way of Euclid, the history of Tacitus, and Vitruvius' architecture, all the while planning his great work on war.

== Commanding officer ==
Returning to the field in 1642, Montecuccoli fought under Archduke Leopold Wilhelm in Silesia where he defeated a Swedish corps under Erik Slang at Troppau. This forced the Swedish commander Lennart Torstensson to relieve the siege of Brieg. Montecuccoli was appointed to Generalfeldwachtmeister and allowed to temporarily leave the Imperial army in Winter 1642 to fight in the First War of Castro as cavalry commander for the Duke of Modena.

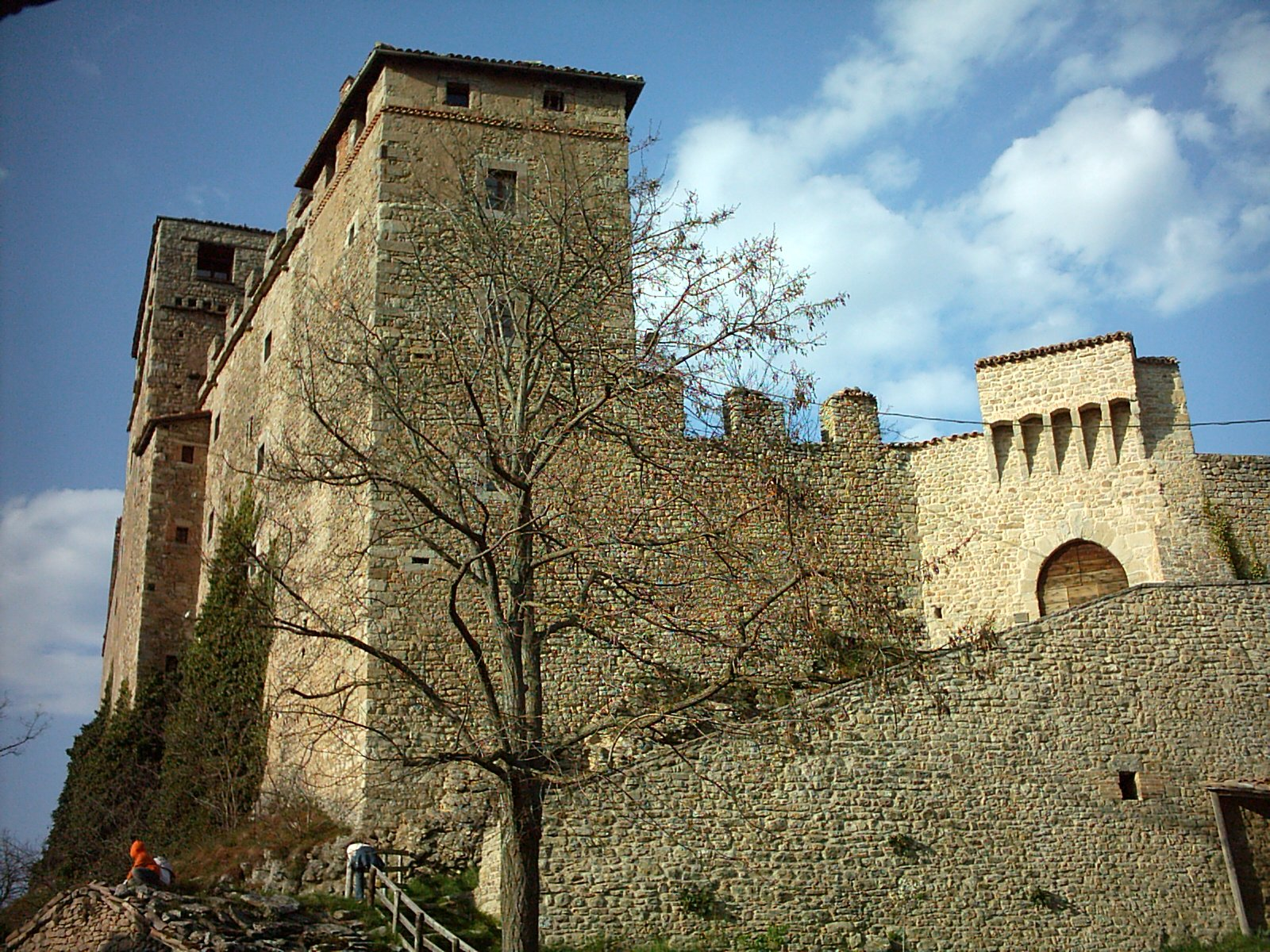
The Castello di Montecuccolo

After his return from Italy in 1644, he was promoted to lieutenant field marshal and nominated as a member of the Hofkriegsrat, the Imperial War council. First substituting the diseased Melchior von Hatzfeldt in Franconia, he reinforced the main army under Matthias Gallas in late 1644 that was encircled by the Swedes at Bernburg after retreating from Holstein. Trying to break through the Swedish blockade, he escaped Swedish attacks in the battle of Jüterbog and evacuated parts of the imperial cavalry to Bohemia.

In early 1645, he rallied 5000 men in Silesia which he brought to the main army at the Danube in June. Under Leopold Wilhelm, he operated against George I Rákóczi who tried to conquer Hungary and to support the Swedish advance following their victory at Jankau. After Rákóczi's retreat and the Swedish defeat at Brno, Montecuccoli was sent back to Silesia which he defended over the course of the year 1646 against a larger Swedish force under Arvid Wittenberg. In 1647, victory at the battle of Triebl in Bohemia won him the rank of General of Cavalry, and at the battle of Zusmarshausen in 1648 his stubborn rearguard fighting rescued the imperials from annihilation.

For some years after the Peace of Westphalia, Montecuccoli was chiefly concerned with the business of the Hofkriegsrat, though he went to Flanders and England as the representative of the emperor, and to Sweden as the envoy of the pope to Queen Christina, and at Modena his lance was victorious in a great tourney.

In 1657, he took part in the Habsburg expedition to support Poland–Lithuania against George Rákóczy II, Charles X Gustav of Sweden, and the Cossacks in the war known in Poland as The Deluge or elsewhere as the Second Northern War. During the conflict, he was promoted to field marshal and succeeded Hatzfeldt as commander of the Habsburg troops.

His army participated in the struggle in Denmark against the invading Swedes, along with Polish troops under Stefan Czarniecki, Frederick William of Brandenburg's army and Danish forces. He led a landing on Funen on 26 June 1659, which ended in failure and him being wounded. Eventually, the war ended with the Peace of Oliva in 1660 and Montecuccoli returned to his sovereign.

From 1661 to 1664, Montecuccoli defended Austria against the Ottoman Empire with inferior numbers. His actions were not only hindered by lack of supplies or the overwhelming numbers of the Ottomans but also by the Emperor's orders to only risk battle if there was the possibility that Vienna could get in danger. Therefore he did not try to relieve the besieged Novi Zrin in 1664 whose defensive capabilities he underestimated. But in the major battle of St. Gotthard Abbey on the Rába, he defeated the Turks so comprehensively that they entered into a twenty-year truce. He was given the Order of the Golden Fleece, and he became president of the Hofkriegsrat and director of artillery in 1668. He also devoted much time to compiling his various works on military history and science. He opposed the progress of the French arms under Louis XIV, and when the inevitable war broke out he received command of the Imperial forces. In the campaign of 1673, he completely outmanoeuvred his rival Turenne on the Neckar and the Rhine and joined his army with that of William III, the prince of Orange on the lower Rhine. Together they captured Bonn, which caused the French to retreat from the Dutch Republic

He retired from the army when, in 1674, the Great Elector was named commander in chief, but the brilliant successes of Turenne in the winter of 1674 and 1675 brought him back. For months the two famous commanders manoeuvred against each other in the Rhine valley, but on the eve of a decisive battle at Salzbach, Turenne was killed and Montecuccoli promptly invaded Alsace, where he engaged in another war of manoeuvre with the Great Condé. At the end of the year 1675, Montecuccoli retired from active command due to his health and was succeeded by Charles of Lorraine.

== Retirement and death ==
The rest of Montecuccoli's life was spent in military administration and literary and scientific work at Vienna. In 1678, he received the title of a Spanish Prince from King Charles II. However, he was not made Duke of Amalfi or Melfi as often is attributed to him. Neither did he obtain the title Prince of the Holy Roman Empire until his death, first his son Leopold Philip Montecuccoli was made Prince in 1689.

Montecuccoli died in an accident at Linz in October 1680.

== Assessment ==
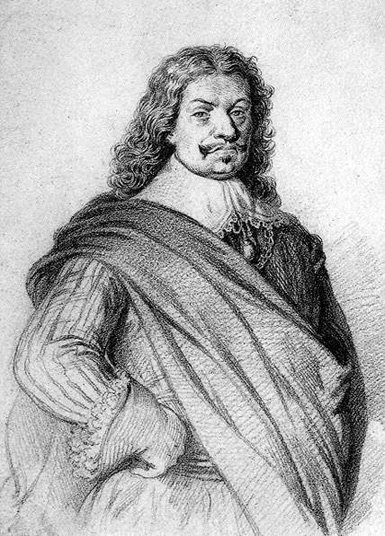
Count Raimondo Montecuccoli

Usually, it is evaluated that as a general, Montecuccoli shared with Turenne and Condé the first place among European soldiers of his time. For his success in halting the Turkish advance, he had been hailed the saviour of Europe. He was also influential as a military theorist, revered - as much as Clausewitz has been in the last two centuries - as the most distinguished modern military thinker. His works were translated into all the major European languages, and were published, within about a hundred years, in seven Italian, two Latin, two Spanish, six French, one Russian, and three German editions. His Memorie della guerra profoundly influenced the following period of warfare. The Britannica names him "unequalled as a master of 17th-century warfare" because he "excelled in the art of fortification and siege, march and countermarch, and cutting his enemy's lines of communications. In advocating standing armies, he clearly foresaw future trends in the military field".

In Croatian historiography, however, Montecuccoli is mainly seen in a rather negative light for his roles in Austro-Turkish War (1663–1664). Croatian Ferdo Šišić described him as: "brave, prudent and educated man, but at the same time too meticulous and slow, which brought him in confrontation with Croatians and Hungarians." He was known for his rivalry to the Zrinski family, especially Nikola Zrinski. According to Šišić, Montecuccoli is also seen as the main culprit for the loss of Novi Zrin in 1664, when he reinforced the defenders to delay the enemy but refused to use the Habsburg army under his command to relieve the fortress and attack the large Ottoman siege army.

== Family ==
In 1657, Montecuccoli married Countess Maria Margarethe von Dietrichstein. With the death of his only son Leopold Philip, who was also a general, in 1698, the lineage became extinct. However, the title of count descended through his daughters to two branches, Austrian and Modenese.

== Bibliography ==
The Memorie della guerra was published at Venice in 1703 and at Cologne in 1704. A French edition was issued in Paris in 1712 and a Latin edition appeared in 1718 at Vienna, and the German Kriegsnachrichten des Fürsten Raymundi Montecuccoli was issued at Leipzig in 1736. Of this work, there are manuscripts in various libraries, and many memoirs on military history, tactics, and fortification, written in Italian, Latin and German, remain still unedited in the archives of Vienna. The collected Opere di Raimondo Montecuccoli was published at Milan (1807), Turin (1821) and Venice (1840), and included political essays and poetry.

== Memorials ==
Since 1909, the Montecuccoliplatz in the district Hietzing in Vienna has commemorated the general in Habsburg service.

In 1934, the Italian navy launched the Raimondo Montecuccoli, a Condottieri class light cruiser named in his honour which served with the Regia Marina during World War II.
