= Rodolfo Giovanni Marazzino =

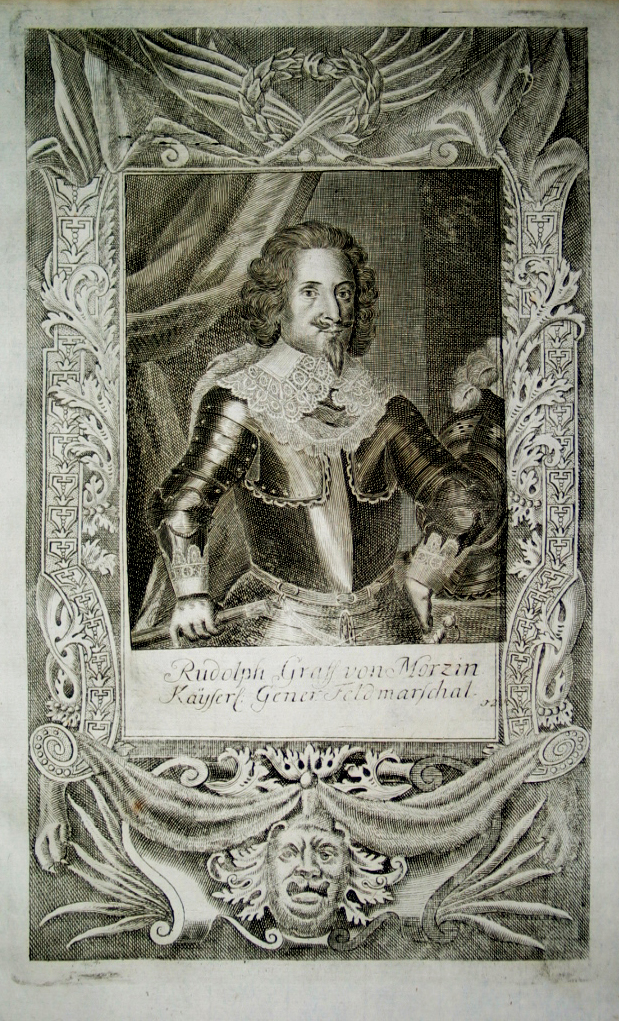
Ruldof Morzin

Count Rodolfo Giovanni di Marazzino, also known as Rudolf Morzin, (c. 11 November 1585 – 1645) was from an Italian family that lived in Bohemia. From 1629 to 1637 he served in the Imperial Army of the Holy Roman Emperor during the Thirty Years War. After the Battle of Wittstock where he still fought for the Emperor in an allied army he was hired by his ally Electorate of Saxony and promoted to the rank of Field Marshal. In 1639 he was defeated at his first battle in charge in the Battle of Chemnitz and dismissed.

== Assessment ==
William Guthrie states that Marazzino was "a brave and reliable subordinate, he was poorly suited to independent command and wholly out of his depth against the Swedish commander Johan Banér".
