= Ottavio Piccolomini =

Italian nobleman, army general of Spain and the Holy Roman Empire (1599–1656)

Imperial Count Prince of the Holy Roman Empire Grandee Duke Ottavio Piccolomini
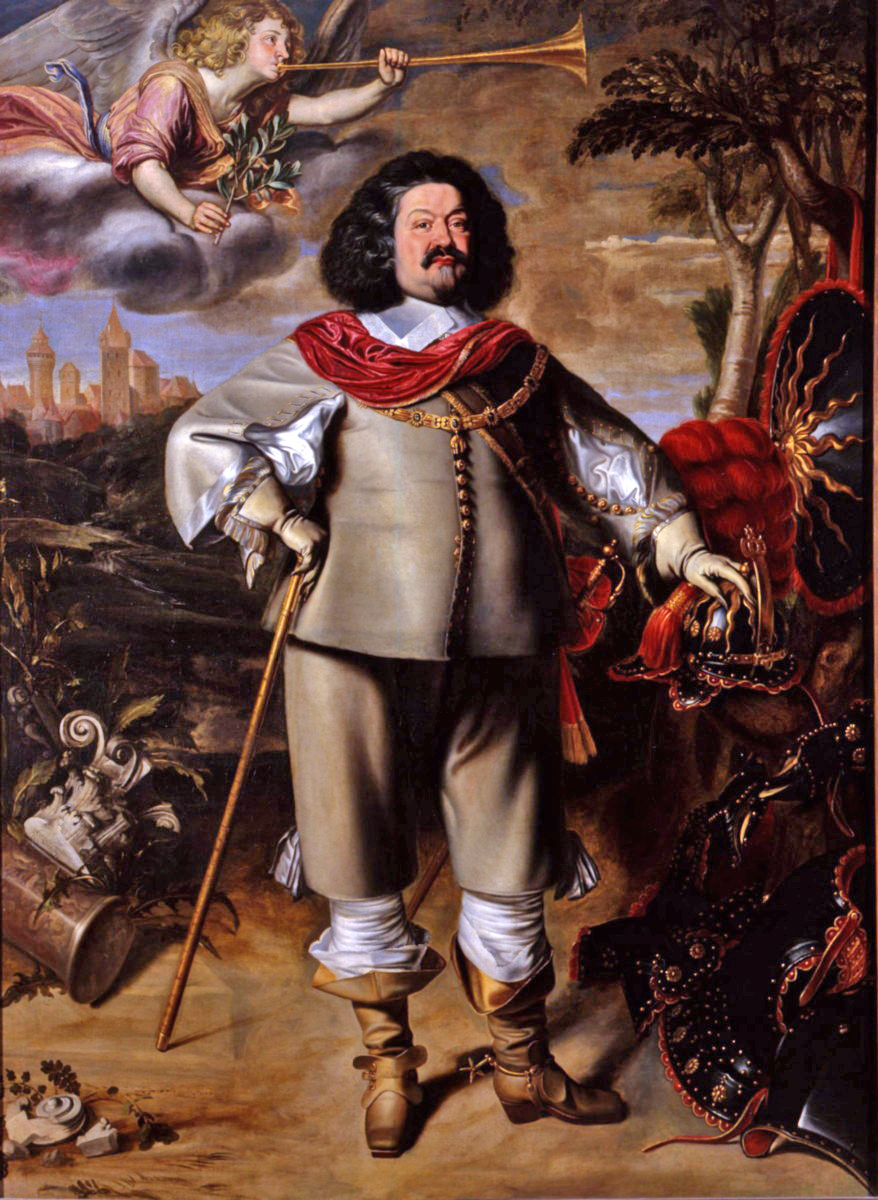
- Portrait of Piccolomini by Anselm van Hulle, Collezione Luca Cristini
- Born: 11 November 1599; Florence, Grand Duchy of Tuscany
- Died: 11 August 1656 (aged 56); Vienna, Austria
- Spouse: Maria Benigna Francisca of Saxe-Lauenburg
- Military career
- Allegiance: Spain; Holy Roman Empire
- Service years: 1616–1656
- Rank: Generalfeldmarschall
- Conflicts: Thirty Years' War: Battle of the White Mountain (1620); Siege of Breda (1624); Battle of Lützen (1632); Battle of Nördlingen (1634); Siege of Leuven (1635); Crossing of the Somme (1636); Siege of Saint-Omer (1638); Relief of Thionville (1639); Battle of Preßnitz (1641); Battle of Wolfenbüttel (1641); Battle of Breitenfeld (1642) (1642); Siege of Freiberg (1643); Battle of Dachau (1648)
- Awards: Order of the Golden Fleece
- Other work: Privy Councillor; Duke of Amalfi

Ottavio Piccolomini, 1st Duke of Amalfi (11 November 1599 – 11 August 1656) was an Italian nobleman whose military career included service as a Spanish general and then as a field marshal of the Holy Roman Empire.

== Early life ==
Piccolomini was born in Florence as youngest son of Silvio Piccolomini and Violante Gerini. The house of Piccolomini was a Sienese family that had seen two of its members elected to the papal throne (Popes Pius II and Pius III). Piccolomini received a military education as a young boy and became a tercio pikeman for the Crown of Spain at the age of almost seventeen.

1618 saw the outbreak of the Thirty Years' War. Piccolomini was appointed captain of a cavalry regiment in Bohemia, sent by the Grand Duke of Tuscany to the emperor's army. He fought with distinction under Count Charles Bucquoy at the Battle of White Mountain in 1620 and later in Hungary.

Coat of Arms of Ottavio Piccolomini Pieri d'Aragona

In 1624 he served for a short time again in the Spanish army besieging Breda and then as a lieutenant-colonel of Gottfried Heinrich Graf zu Pappenheim's cuirassier regiment in Northern Italy. In 1627 he returned to the Imperial service as colonel and captain of the personal guard of Albrecht von Wallenstein, Duke of Friedland. In this capacity, Piccolomini fell into disgrace for attempting to extort money from people of Stargard in Pomerania. But his dedication and contrition saw him return to the rank of "colonel of horse and foot", commanding both a cavalry and an infantry regiment.

In 1628 his brother, Ascanio Piccolomini, was appointed Archbishop of Siena which secured Ottavio a position in the diplomatic world. Wallenstein made use of his subordinate's capacity for negotiation and intrigue. During the Mantuan War, Piccolomini took a prominent part in the dual role of subtle diplomat and plundering soldier of fortune.

In 1630 came the invasion of Germany by Gustavus Adolphus of Sweden. Piccolomini could not directly return to Germany because he was held hostage at Ferrara until September 1631 to guarantee the Peace of Cherasco that ended the Mantuan War. Despite his support for Wallenstein, he was not included in the list of promotions when the Duke resumed action against Saxony, Brandenburg and Sweden. Thereafter, Piccolomini served as a colonel under Feldmarschallleutnant Heinrich Holk, a Danish officer, in the battle of Lützen and other operations.

Nineteenth-century authors were so impressed by Piccolomini's role in the battle of Lützen that they falsely ascribed to him the command of the entire Imperial left wing. He did, though, play a pivotal role at the head of his cavalry regiment, leading numerous cavalry charges against the Swedish army, having five horses shot under him, and receiving six painful bruises from musket balls that deflected off his armour.

== As a commanding officer ==
After reading the official report of the battle, the emperor made Piccolomini General-Feldwachtmeister. At the same time, Holk, who had played an even more crucial role in holding the Imperial army together at Lützen, was promoted to field marshal at Wallenstein's insistence, much to Piccolomini's chagrin.

In the campaign of 1633, Piccolomini was appointed commander of a detachment posted at Königgratz assigned to bar the enemy's advance from Silesia into Bohemia. In May, Piccolomini accompanied Wallenstein and the main army on their way to Silesia in an attempt to compel the electors of Brandenburg and Saxony to join the emperor against the Swedes. Because Piccolomini disapproved of Wallenstein's policy and its results, he joined in the military conspiracy to oust the duke. On 24 January 1634 Ferdinand II signed a decree dismissing Wallenstein and instructed Count Gallas and Piccolomini to determine a course of action for removing the duke, but did not specifically demand his death. Nevertheless, the conspiracy developed into a plot to assassinate the Duke; Wallenstein was killed on 25 February 1634 at Cheb Castle. Piccolomini's reward was his marshal's baton, 100,000 gulden and the estate of Náchod in the Orlické mountains in East Bohemia. Piccolomini's part in the assassination was set out in fictionalised form in Friedrich Schiller's play, Wallenstein.

On 5 and 6 September of that same year, Piccolomini distinguished himself at the Battle of Nördlingen. In his first independent command following the battle, he expelled the opposing troops of Sweden and the Heilbronn League from Franconia. From 1635 to 1639, Piccolomini commanded an Imperial auxiliary corps supporting Spain in the Southern Netherlands and Northern France. In this position, he achieved a number of military successes but often complained about a lack of support from the Spanish authorities. In 1636, his corps supported the Spanish offensive in France that crossed the Somme and captured the important fortress of Corbie. After his own troops took Roye and approached Paris as far as Compiègne, Piccolomini urged Cardinal-Infante Ferdinand of Austria, the leader of the Spanish operations, to advance further, but the Cardinal-Infante deemed the offensive to be too high risk with little reward.

Piccolomini's achievements included relieving French sieges of Saint-Omer in 1638 together with Thomas Francis, Prince of Carignano and especially of Thionville on 7 July 1639 in a crushing victory over the Marquis de Feuquieres. He was rewarded with the status of Imperial Count in 1638 and the elevation to the office of privy councillor and the dukedom of Amalfi from King Philip IV of Spain in 1639.

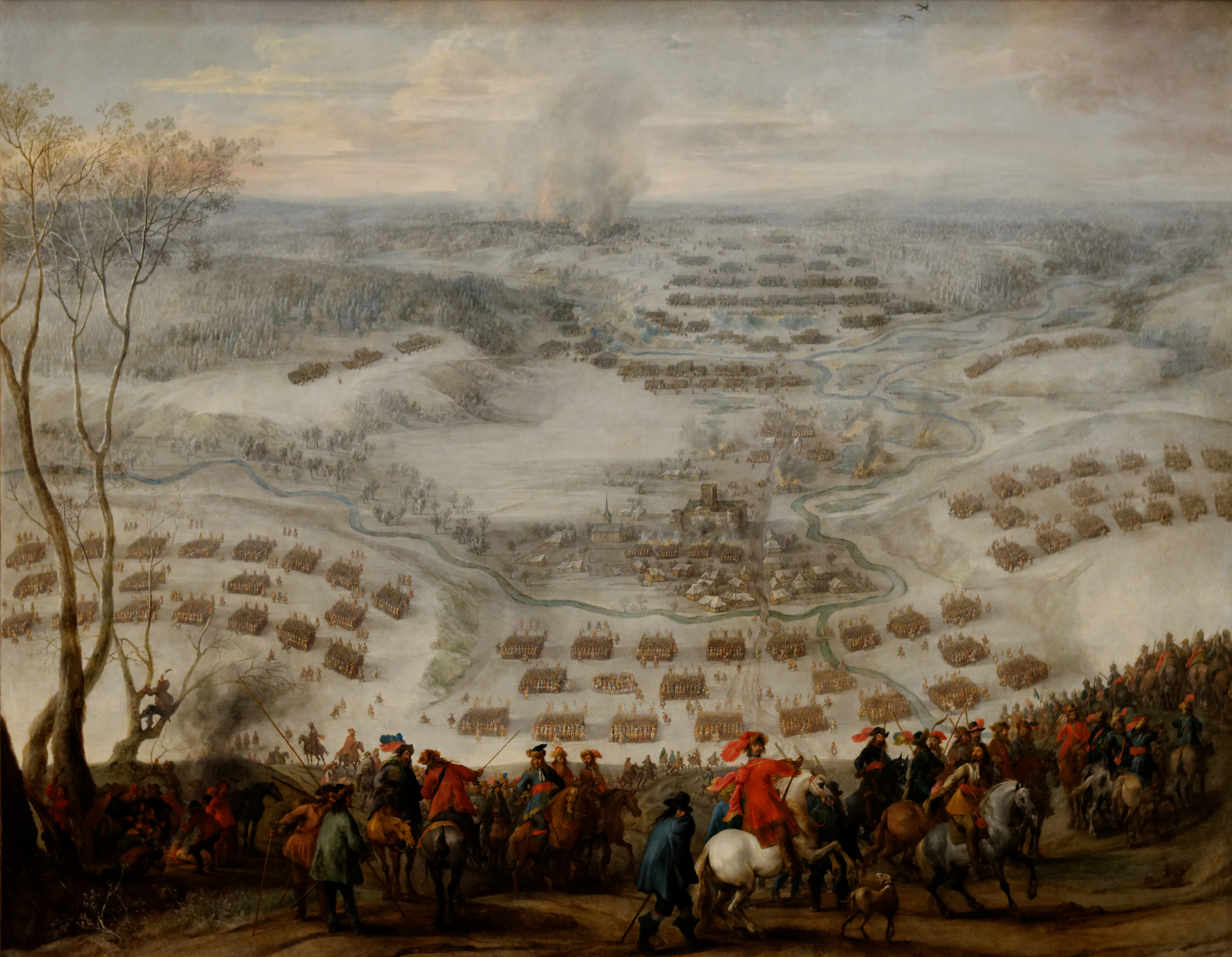
Ottavio Piccolomini at the Battle of Preßnitz

Still in 1639, Piccolomini and his corps were recalled from the Southern Netherlands by the emperor to end the Swedish invasion of Bohemia. Despite own hopes to replace Matthias Gallas as main commander of the Imperials, Piccolomini was ordered to assist the emperor's brother, Archduke Leopold Wilhelm of Austria. Together they repelled the Swedes under Johan Banér and secured Bohemia and Saxony in 1640. However, they failed in their main goal to beat the Swedish army in battle. After Banér's failed attempt to attack the Regensburg Reichstag in January 1641, Piccolomini and Gottfried Huyn von Geleen chased him with the united Imperial and Bavarian force. Nonetheless, Piccolomini could only catch and defeat the rear of Banér's army in Neunburg vorm Wald and Preßnitz while the rest escaped. In November 1642, the Imperials finally faced the entire Swedish army but lost the second battle of Breitenfeld against Lennart Torstensson.

Thereafter he spent several years in the Spanish service and received the title of grandee and induction into the Order of the Golden Fleece. After being recalled to Spain in 1647, he resigned as Spanish commander with the intention to return to the Imperial army.

== As commander-in-chief ==
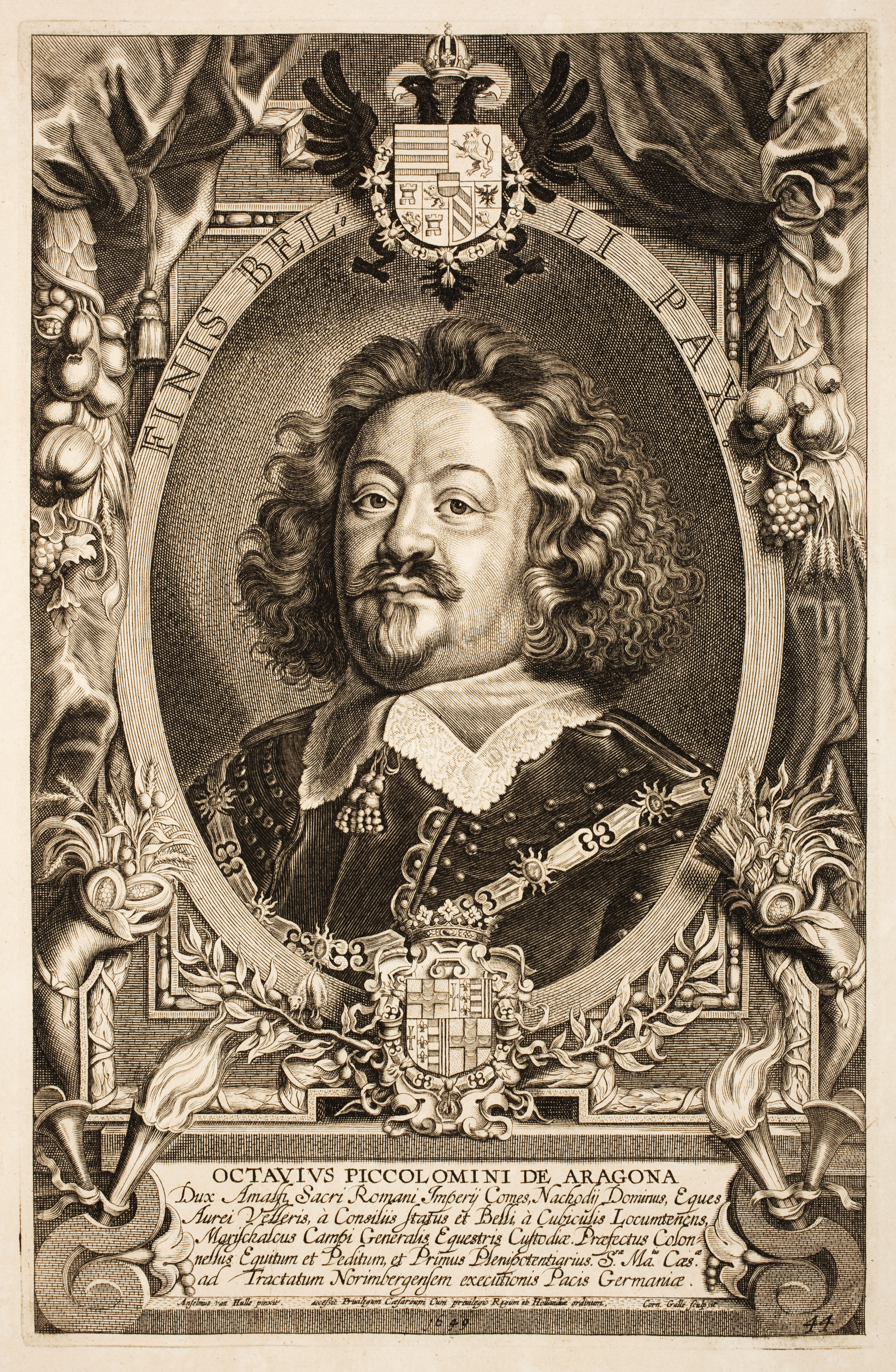
Engraving of Ottavio Piccolomini

When the Imperial commander Peter Melander, Graf von Holzappel, fell in battle at Zusmarshausen in May 1648, Piccolomini was at last appointed lieutenant-general of the emperor. He conducted the final campaign of the Thirty Years' War in which he and the Bavarians under Hunolstein stopped the Swedish and French advance at the rivers Inn and Danube and forced them to retreat out of Bavaria across the Lech.

After the Peace of Westphalia, Piccolomini served as Imperial plenipotentiary at the executive congress of Nuremberg that discussed and oversaw the execution of the peace regulations. Three days after the congress had finished its labours in October 1650, Ferdinand III addressed a letter of thanks to the "Prince Piccolomini", declaring him Prince of the Empire and awarding him a gift of 114,566 gulden.

== Marriage, death, and legacy ==
On 4 June 1651 Piccolomini married Maria Benigna Francisca of Saxe-Lauenburg, daughter of Duke Julius Henry of Saxe-Lauenburg with no legitimate children. Piccolomini had adopted his distant nephew Josef Silvio, most likely Schiller's inspiration for the fictional son Max Piccolomini in Wallenstein. Josef Silvio was murdered by the Swedes after the Battle of Jankov (near Votice in the district of Tábor) in southern Bohemia in 1645.

Piccolomini's titles and estates passed to his brother's grandson. With the death of the latter's nephew Octavio Aeneas Josef in 1757, the line became extinct. Piccolomini had two known illegitimate sons – Ascanio and Diego, who left descendants, one in Bohemia and the other in Italy. His elder son Ascanio died as a captain of infantry in the battle near Mírov in September 1643, while the younger son Diego died in Italy after gaining the title "don" and becoming a "noble" married to Nobile Donna Maria Anna Tarragona Ruxoto. Ascanio himself had an illegitimate son with Liduska Nyvlt.

Piccolomini died after falling from a horse on 11 August 1656.

== Sources ==
- Bierther, Kathrin (2001). "Piccolomini, Ottavio". Neue Deutsche Biographie (in German). Vol. 20. Berlin: Duncker & Humblot. pp. 408–410. (full text online).
- Brzezinski, Richard (2001). Lützen 1632. Oxford: Osprey. ISBN 9781855325524.
- Hallwich, Hermann (1888). "Piccolomini, Octavio Fürst" . Allgemeine Deutsche Biographie (in German). Vol. 26. Leipzig: Duncker & Humblot. pp. 95–103.
- Höbelt, Lothar (2016). Von Nördlingen bis Jankau: Kaiserliche Strategie und Kriegsführung 1634-1645 (in German). Wien: Heeresgeschichtliches Museum. ISBN 978-3902551733.
- Höfer, Ernst (1997). Das Ende des Dreißigjährigen Krieges. Strategie und Kriegsbild (in German). Köln/Weimar/Wien: Böhlau. ISBN 978-3-412-04297-4.
- Israel, Jonathan Irvine (1997). Conflicts of empires: Spain, the low countries and the struggle for world supremacy, 1585-1713. Continuum International Publishing Group. ISBN 1-85285-161-9.
- Wedgwood, C.V. (1938). The Thirty Years War. New York Review Books Classics. pp. 345. ISBN 1590171462.
- Weyhe-Eimke, Arnold von (1885). "Das Haus der Piccolomini aus den vom Papste Pius II. adoptirten Familien Todeschini und Pieri auf der Herrschaft Nachod in Böhmen". Jahrbuch der k. k. heraldischen Gesellschaft Adler zu Wien. pp. 97–107.
- Wilson, Peter H. (2009). The Thirty Years War: Europe's Tragedy. Harvard University Press. ISBN 978-0-674-03634-5.
- Wilson, Peter H. (2018). Lützen: Great Battles Series. Oxford: Oxford University Press. ISBN 978-0199642540.
- Piccolomini in Libro de Oro de la Nobleza del Mediterráneo
