= Battle of Chemnitz =

1639 battle during the Thirty Years' War

- Part of the Thirty Years' War
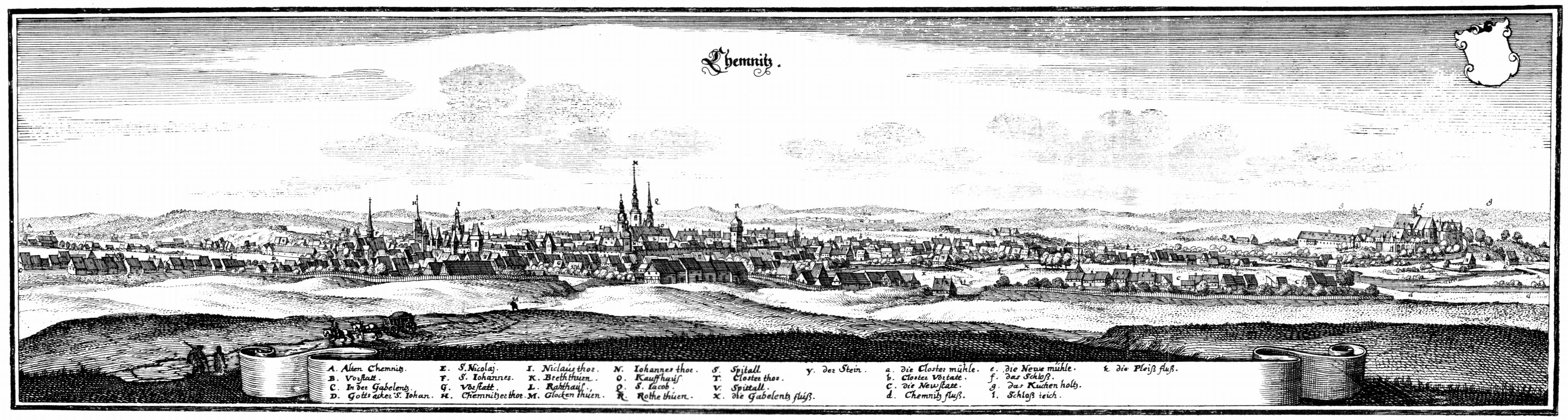
- Engraving of Chemnitz around 1650 by Matthäus Merian
Date	14 April 1639
Location	Chemnitz, Saxony, Holy Roman Empire 50°50′N 12°55′E
Result	Swedish victory

Belligerents
Swedish Empire	Holy Roman Empire; Electorate of Saxony

Commanders and leaders
(Swedish Empire) Johan Banér (Swedish Empire) Lennart Torstensson (Swedish Empire) Torsten Stålhandske	(Electorate of Saxony) Rodolfo Marazzino (Holy Roman Empire) Johann Christoph von Puchheim (POW) (Holy Roman Empire) Raimondo Montecuccoli

Strength
20,000	8,000

Casualties and losses
500 killed or wounded	2,000 men: 500 killed or wounded; 1,500 captured; 6 guns
- Location within Saxony Battle of Chemnitz (Germany)

The Battle of Chemnitz, 14 April 1639, took place near Chemnitz in Saxony during the Thirty Years' War. Swedish forces under Johan Banér inflicted a crushing defeat on a combined Saxon/Imperial detachment under Rodolfo Giovanni Marazzino and von Puchheim.

== Background ==
The former Swedish ally Saxony defected in the Peace of Prague (1635) to Emperor Ferdinand II. The Swedish victory at the Battle of Wittstock in autumn 1636 led to a brief Swedish incursion into Saxony, but this was overturned by an Imperial counteroffensive in 1637. The main Imperial army led by Matthias Gallas had returned from Burgundy and repulsed the Swedes back to Pomerania. Over most of the year 1638, the Swedes were enclosed in a few coastal fortresses on the Baltic Sea. However, while the Swedes under Banér were supplied and reinforced by the sea, the Imperials received little support by their allies Brandenburg and Saxony and were unable to consistently supply their army in the already war-ravaged region. After Gallas was pushed back to Mecklenburg by Banér in autumn and was denied winter quarters by the neighbouring Lower Saxon Circle, he retreated with his shrinking army to Bohemia.

In January 1639, Banér seized the opportunity of Gallas' retreat and crossed the Elbe with the Swedish army. He went through Lüneburg that chose to stay neutral but provided him with supplies. To keep his army intact and bring the war into the lands of the Emperor and his allies, Banér traversed the devastated area and attacked Saxony with 18,000 men. After he destroyed an Imperial detachment under Hans Wolf von Salis at Elsterberg in March, he faced unexpected little resistance, taking Zwickau and Chemnitz in quick succession. Only when he attacked Freiberg, the silver mine of the Saxon Elector, the garrison vigorously resisted. Banér lost 500 men in an unsuccessful assault. When the Saxon army under Marazzino approached Freiberg with 5,000 men, Banér abandoned the siege and fell back via Chemnitz to join forces with Lennart Torstensson.

The Saxon commander underestimated the Swedish strength and pursued Banér to Chemnitz. However, Banér had reunited his force with Torstensson at Zeitz on 12 April, boosting his overall strength to 20,000 men. He decided to attack the Saxons, now counting 8,000 men, before they could be reinforced by Imperials under Melchior von Hatzfeldt who were approaching from Thuringia.

== Battle ==
When the Saxon army and its Imperial detachment under Johann Christoph von Puchheim and Raimondo Montecuccoli learned of the Swedish advance on the evening of the 13 April, the broke up their camp at Hohenstein and retreated to Chemnitz.

Banér arrived at Hohenstein when only the Imperial rearguard was still there. The Swedish vanguard attacked the Imperials and drove them back to rest of their army. The way to Chemnitz led through a moory defile that was defended by Imperial dragoons. The difficulties of the Swedes to transit the terrain gave Marrazzino enough time to put his army in battle formation. The Imperial-Saxon left leaned against Chemnitz while the right was positioned behind the Chemnitz river.

Four Swedish cavalry regiments first transited the defile and attacked the Imperial-Saxon left, with Banér's own regiment at front. Initially they were repulsed with serious loss but in the second attempt they swept away the Imperial-Saxon left. Marrazzino's left was forced to retreat behind the right battle wing across the Chemnitz river. Banér received reinforments by additional Swedish troops who made it through the defile, and decided to use his momentum. Without delay, he ordered to cross the river and attack Marrazzino's right wing. The latter was still shocked by the fate of the left wing and took flight at the approach of the Swedes. The Imperial-Saxon infantry in the centre tried to retreat into the town of Chemnitz but was mostly scattered and captured by the Hakkapeliitta under Torsten Stålhandske.

In the end, the Swedes were able to rout a large portion of the opposing forces, taking 1,500 prisoners as well as the Saxon artillery. One of the prisoners was Puchheim, the commander of the Imperial detachment.

== Aftermath ==
Marazzino was relieved of his duties by the elector and court-martialled by the Emperor. Following the battle, the Swedes failed to conquer Freiberg in a second attempt but took Pirna and advanced into Bohemia.
