= Château-Voué =

Château-Voué Dürkastel (German)
- Commune
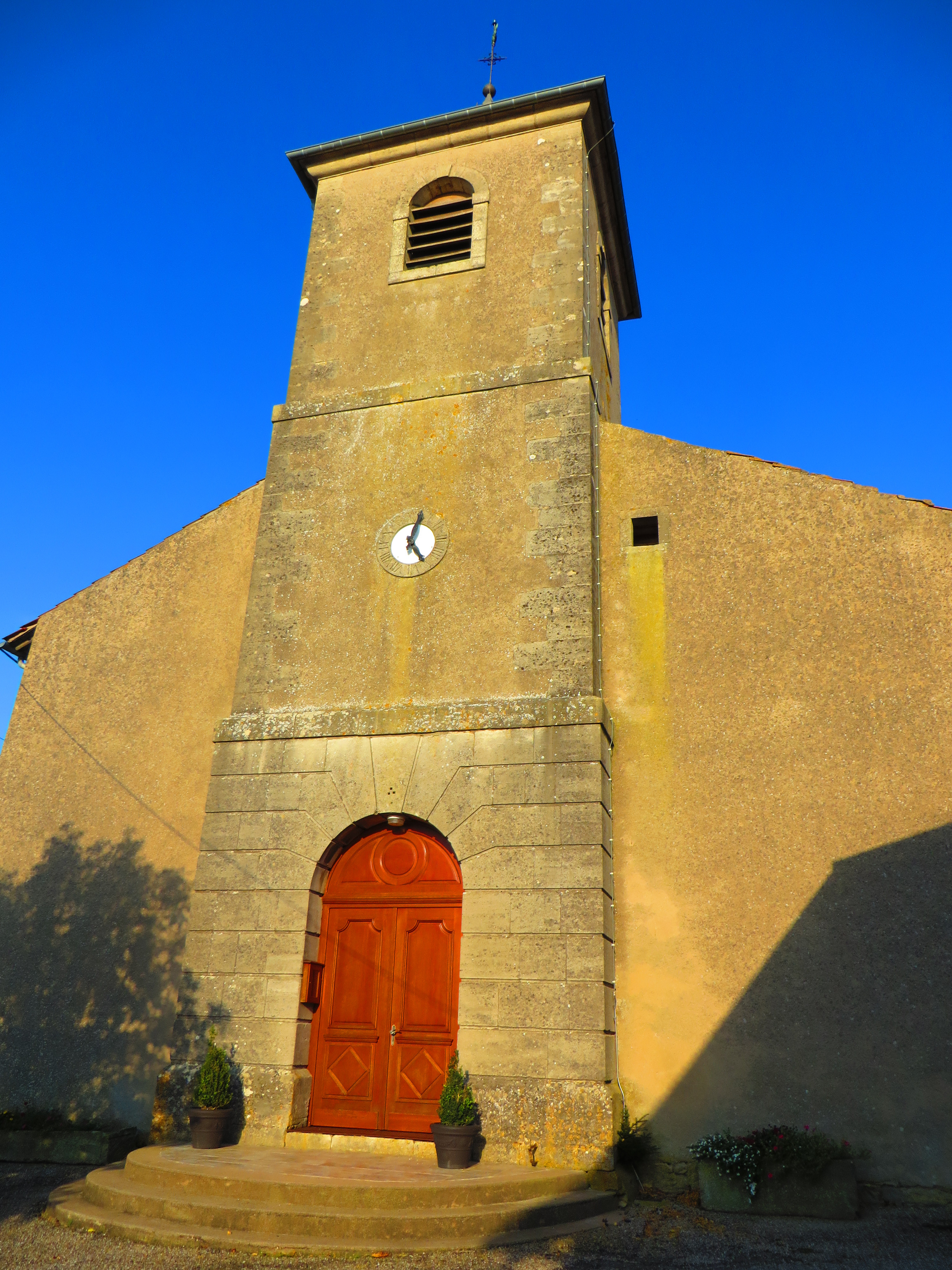
- The church in Château-Voué

- Coat of arms
- Location of Château-Voué
- Location within France Location within Grand Est
- Coordinates: 48°51′05″N 6°37′28″E
- Country: France
- Region: Grand Est
- Department: Moselle
- Arrondissement: Sarrebourg-Château-Salins
- Canton: Le Saulnois
- Intercommunality: Saulnois

Government
  - Mayor (2020–2026): Isabelle Schmitt-Knaff
- Area^{1}: 7.47 km^{2} (2.88 sq mi)
- Elevation: 250 m (820 ft)
- Highest elevation: 334 m (1,096 ft)
- Lowest elevation: 214 m (702 ft)
- Population (2023): 113
  - Density: 15.1/km^{2} (39.2/sq mi)
- Time zone: UTC+01:00 (CET)
  - Summer (DST): UTC+02:00 (CEST)
- INSEE/Postal code: 57133 /57170
- ^{1} French Land Register data, which excludes lakes, ponds, glaciers > 1 km^{2} (0.386 sq mi or 247 acres) and river estuaries.

Château-Voué (French: [ʃɑto vwe]; German: Dürkastel) is a commune in the Moselle department in Grand Est in north-eastern France.

Localities of the commune: Bérange (German: Beringen) and Dédeling (German: Dedlingen).

== See also ==
- Communes of the Moselle department
- Parc naturel régional de Lorraine
