= Generalfeldwachtmeister =

Generalfeldwachtmeister is a historical military rank of general officer level in the armies of the German and Scandinavian countries, corresponding to the rank of maréchal de camp in France.

A Generalfeldwachtmeister ranked above a brigadier, but below a lieutenant general (Generalleutnant) (in Austria, Feldmarschalleutnant). The title may be literally translated as "master general of field guards", reflecting the original task of the office holder: the inspection of the pickets and the supervision of the dispositions of brigades and regiments in the field and on the march.

In 1705 the Austruan army contained 60 Generalfeldwachtmeister officers, with 80 more senior senerals. The title was superseded from the middle of the 18th century by that of Generalmajor (i.e. major general).

== Feldwachtmeister ==
At regimental level the corresponding function was carried out by the Feldwachtmeister or Obristfeldwachtmeister, Obrist-Wachtmeister or Oberstwachtmeister. This rank was gradually replaced by that of major.
