= Battle of Breitenfeld (1642) order of battle =

The Second Battle of Breitenfeld was a major engagement of the Thirty Years' War between the Imperial Army of the Holy Roman Emperor under Archduke Leopold Wilhelm of Austria and Ottavio Piccolomini, supported by Saxon troops, and the Swedish Army under Lennart Torstensson. It was the last battle of the war featuring more than 20.000 soldiers on each side and one of the rare occasions where both combatants were attacking.

The Swedish Army had been besieging the nearby Saxon fortress Leipzig but relieved it in face of the Imperial advance. The imperials interpreted the Swedish movements as an unorganized retreat because the Swedes had trickled out their troops to obtain a more favourable terrain. The imperial war council under the Archduke overruled Piccolomini's objections against battling an almost even-matched opponent in open field and ordered an attack. The Swedes awaited them in battle formation at Breitenfeld, the place of Gustavus Adolphus' famous victory in 1631.

Both armies used a linear formation with two wings of cavalry around the infantry in the center. The infantry was divided in two subgroups by both armies because of the woods that intersected the imperial lines. An early rout of the Madlo Arquebusier and most of the Saxon regiments at the imperial left wing allowed the Swedes to gain the upper hand on this side of the battle. The imperial right wing achieved similar success against the Swedish left until Torstensson sent large parts of his victorious right around the woods and behind the imperial center to attack the imperial right from the rear. They ultimately drove the imperials from the field, only the Leibregiments supported by Alt- and Neu-Piccolomini, Mislik, Borneval and Luttke resisted long enough to cover the retreat of the right group of the imperial center. The left group however was encircled and forced to surrender by the victorious Swedes.

== Imperial-Saxon army ==
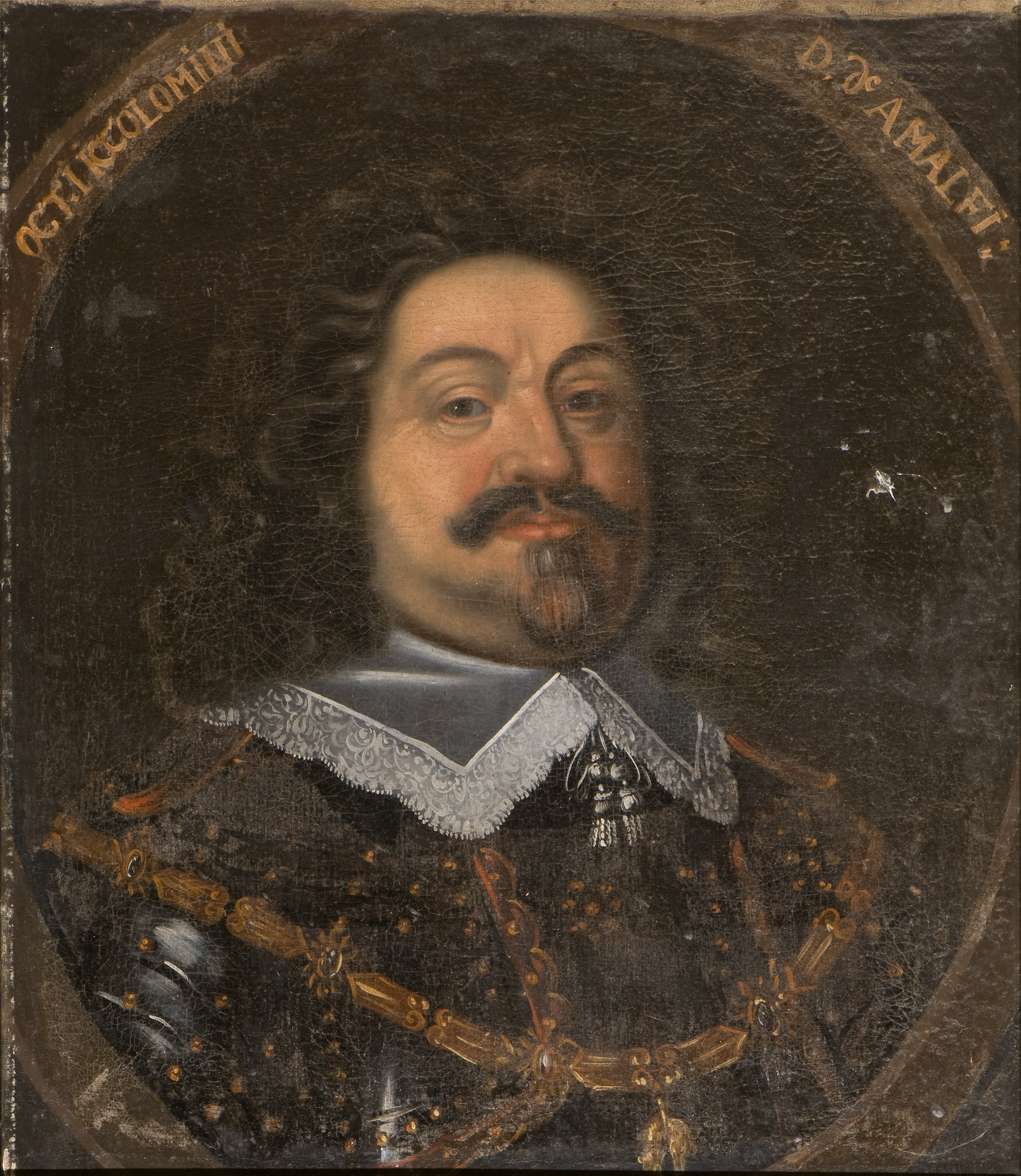
Ottavio Piccolomini

There are essentially two different orders of battle for the Imperial-Saxon army. The one cited by William Guthrie mostly uses the information from the Theatrum Europaeum. According to Otto Rudert, this order of battle was the intended one but was changed shortly prior to the battle. Rudert and Arndt Preil instead use the Callenbergische Battaglia from the battle report of Colonel Kurt Reinecke von Callenberg. The Battaglia is meant to indicate the actual order of troops in battle and is therefore used in this list.

Overall commanders were Archduke Leopold Wilhelm of Austria and Field-Marshal Ottavio Piccolomini. Unless otherwise noted, all units are German.

=== Left ===
Generalfeldwachtmeister Hans Christoph von Puchheim, 31 squadrons

First Echelon (Colonel Nicola Montard de Noyrel)

- Pompeij Cuirassier – Colonel Thomas Pompeji
- Madlo Arquebusier – Colonel Hans Georg Madlo
- Luigi Gonzaga Cuirassier – Major Khauts
- Vorhauer Cuirassier – Colonel Hans Vorhauer
- Wintz Cuirassier – Colonel Christoph von Wintz
- Jung-Heister Cuirassier – Colonel Arnold von Heister
- Alt-Heister Cuirassier – Lieutenant Colonel Andreas Stahl
- Nicola Cuirassier – Lieutenant Colonel Dominik Cadé
- Puchheim Cuirassier – Lieutenant Colonel Candido

Second Echelon (Colonel von Schleinitz)

- Burksdorf Cuirassier – Colonel Konrad von Burgsdorff
- Warlowsky Arquebusier – Colonel Peter Warlowsky
- Krafft zu Lammerstorf Cuirassier – Colonel Heinrich Krafft zu Lammerstorf
- Callenberg Saxon Cuirassier – Colonel Kurt Reinecke von Callenberg
- Gall à Bourck Dragoons – Lieutenant Colonel Olivier Stephanson
- Knoche Saxon Cuirassier – Colonel von Knoche
- Gallas Dragoons – Lieutenant Colonel Johann Ablmont
- Schleinitz Saxon Cuirassier – Colonel von Schleinitz

Flankers

- 8 squadrons of Croats and Cossacks

=== Center ===
Feldzeugmeister Ernst Roland von Suys, 11 brigades, 8 squadrons, 46 guns

Left Group (Feldzeugmeister Johann Barwitz von Fernemont and Generalfeldwachtmeister Anton von Weveld)

- Enkevort Infantry – Lieutenant Colonel Michael Thomb
- Weveld Infantry – Lieutenant Colonel Simon Schrenk genannt Notzing
- Caretto di Grana Infantry – Lieutenant Colonel Paolo Pestaluzzi
- Sax-Lauenburg Infantry – Lieutenant Colonel Rohrscheid
- Moncada Infantry – Colonel Matteo Marchese di Moncada y Cardona

Right Group (Generalfeldwachtmeister Camillo Gonzaga)

- Suys Infantry (Walloon) – Lieutenant Colonel Eusebius von Crivelli
- Annibale Gonzaga Infantry – Lieutenant Colonel Valentin Hauser
- Ranfft Infantry – Colonel Johann Christoph Ranfft von Wiesenthal
- Archduke Leib Infantry – Lieutenant Colonel Gustav
- Fernemont Infantry – Lieutenant Colonel Nouskovsky
- Wachenheim Infantry – Colonel Otto Ludwig von Wachenheim

Reserve (Feldzeugmeister Suys)

- Archduke Leib – Colonel Sforza Marchese di Pallavicini
- Piccolomini Leib – Lieutenant Colonel Ghiselieri
- Grodetzky Arquebusier – Colonel Georg Dietrich Grodetzky von Grodetz
- Gissenburg Cuirassier – Colonel Tobias von Gissenburg
- Desfours Cuirassier (Spanish-German) – Colonel Johann von Desfours
- Paconchay Dragoons – Colonel Martin de Paconchay

=== Right ===
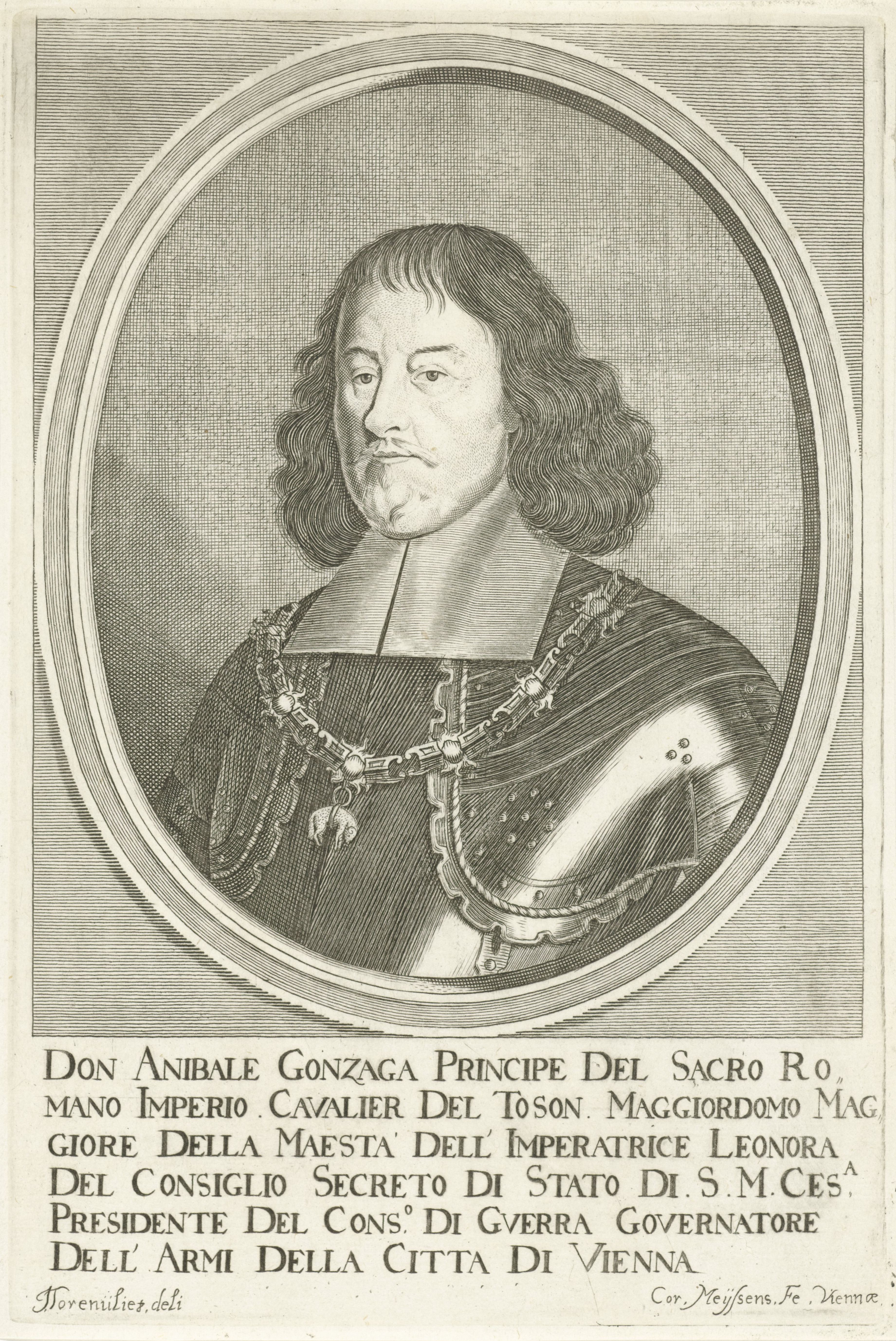
Annibale Gonzaga

Feldzeugmeister Annibale Gonzaga, 32 squadrons

First Echelon (Lieutenant Field Marshal Albert Gaston Spinola von Bruay)

- Mislik Cuirassier – Colonel Johann Sigmund von Mislik
- Alt-Piccolomini Cuirassier – Lieutenant Colonel Georg von Crespu
- Bruay Cuirassier – Lieutenant Colonel Claus von Paumgarten
- Jung Cuirassier – Colonel Gottfried von Jung
- Montecuccoli Cuirassier – Lieutenant Colonel Claudius Franz von Lannoy
- Sperreuter Cuirassier – Lieutenant Colonel Johann Walter
- Neu-Piccolomini Cuirassier– Colonel Paul Béchamp
- La Corona Dragoons – Colonel Johann de la Corona

Second Echelon (Generalfeldwachtmeister Jacob Borneval d’Arlin)

- Spiegel Cuirassier – Lieutenant Colonel Lützelburg
- Lüttke Cuirassier – Colonel Moriz von der Lüttke
- Wolframsdorf Cuirassier – Colonel Rudolph Georg von Wolframsdorf
- Kapaun Cuirassier – Colonel Albrecht Weikhard Kapaun von Swoykow
- Hanau Saxon Cuirassier – Generalfeldwachtmeister Augustin von Hanau
- Borneval Cuirassier – Lieutenant Colonel Dohna
- Munster Arquebusier – Colonel Christian von Münster

Flankers

- 8 squadrons of Croats and Cossacks

== Swedish army ==
Field Marshal Lennart Torstensson

=== Right ===
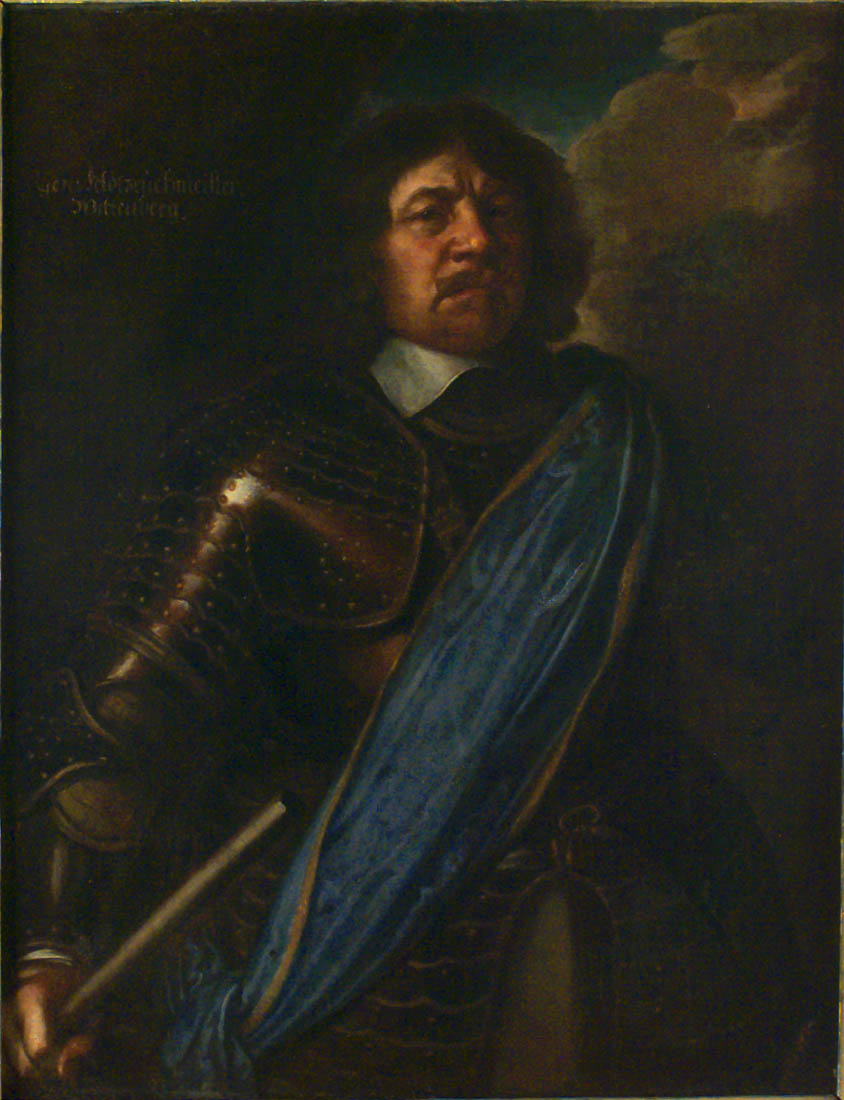
Arvid Wittenberg

Major general Arvid Wittenberg, major general Torsten Stålhandske, 24 squadrons, 13 detachments, 13 guns

First Echelon (Major general Wittenberg)

- Torstensson Leib Cuirassier
- Hesse Cuirassier
- Duval Cuirassier – Colonel Tobias Macdougall
- Hoking Cuirassier
- Kinsky Cuirassier
- Detachments: each regiment 40 musketeers and one light gun

Second Echelon (Major general Stålhandske)

- Derfflinger Cuirassier
- Wittkopf Cuirassier – Colonel Johann von Wittkopf
- Helm Wrangel
- Polish Cuirassier

=== Center ===
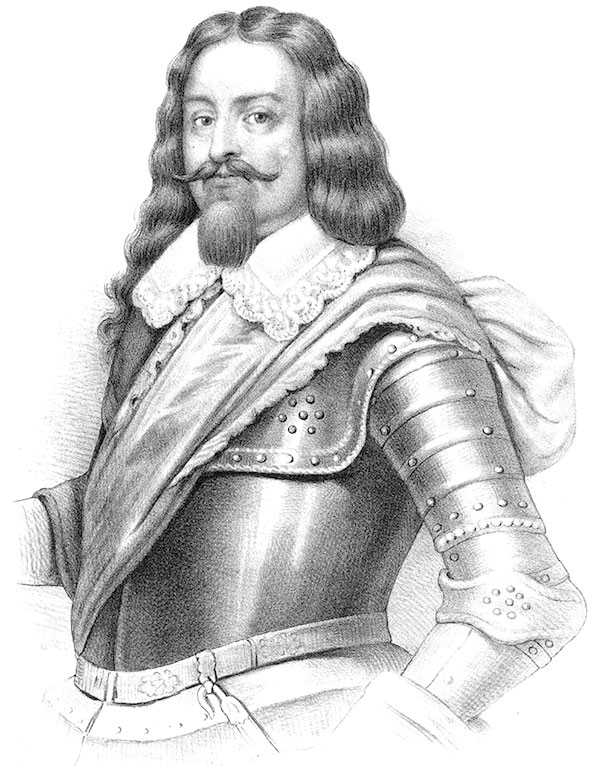
Johan Lilliehöök

Riksfälttygmästare Johan Lilliehöök, 11 brigades, 3 squadrons, 18 heavy and 23 light guns

Left Group (Major general Carl Gustaf Wrangel)
First Echelon

- C. G. Wrangel Infantry (Swedish-German)
- Mortaigne Infantry

Second Echelon

- Axel Lillie Infantry (Swedish-German) – Major general Axel Lillie
- Schlieben Infantry – Colonel Hans Heinrich von Schlieben

Right Group (Major general Kaspar Kornelius Mortaigne de Potelles)
First Echelon

- Lilliehöök Infantry
- Banér Infantry – Colonel Gustav Banér

Second Echelon

- Pfuhl Infantry
- Jeschwitski Infantry

Third Echelon Reserve

- Maul Infantry – Colonel William Maul
- Plettenberg Infantry
- Old Blue Infantry (Veteran)
- 3 cavalry squadrons from different regiments

=== Left ===
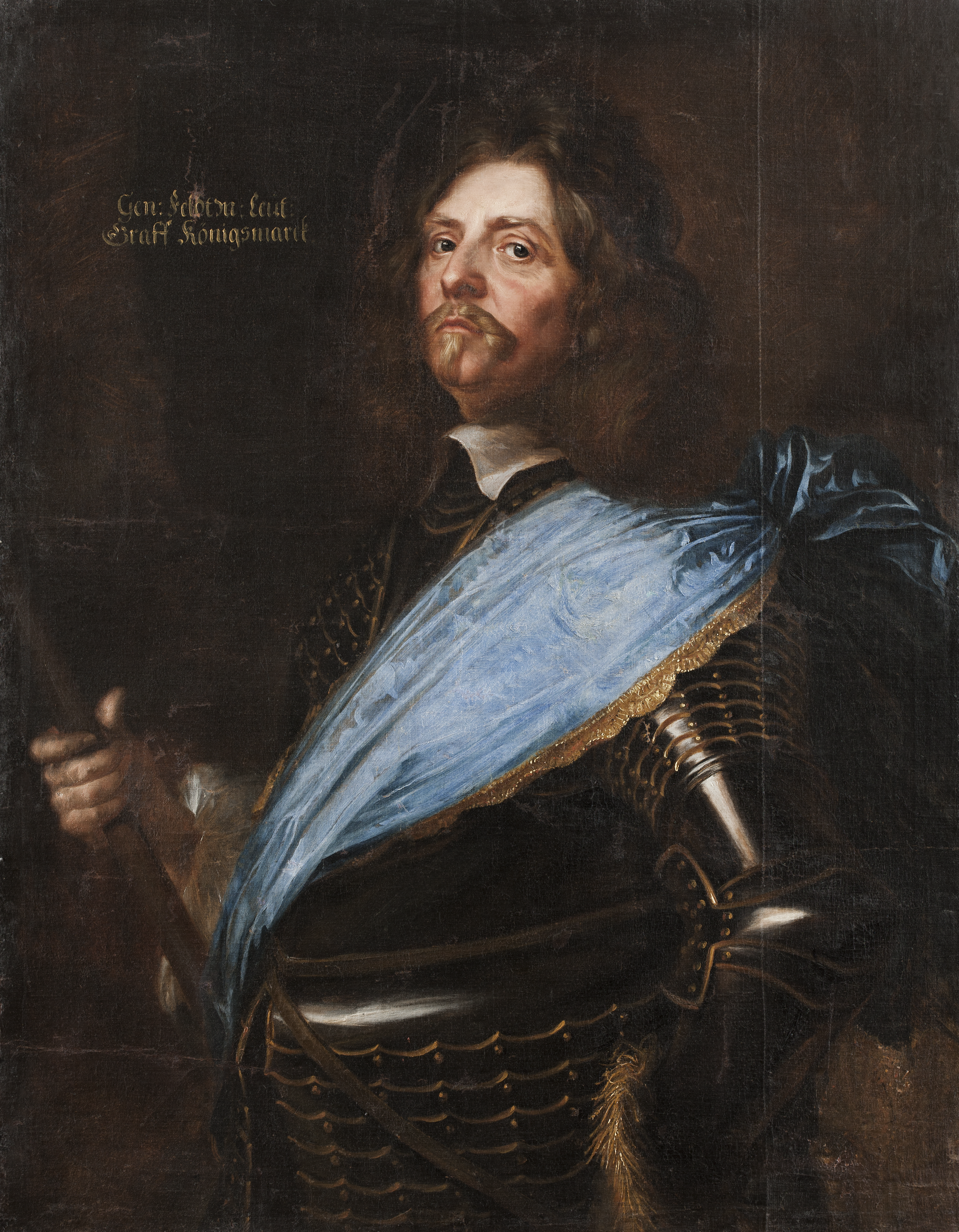
Hans Christoff von Königsmarck

Major general Erik Slang, major general Hans Christoff von Königsmarck, 24 squadrons, 16 detachments, 16 guns

First Echelon (Major general Slang)

- Stålhandske Cuirassier (Finn-German)
- Wittenberg Cuirassier (Finn-German)
- Cratzenstein Cuirassier
- Douglas Cuirassier – Colonel Robert Douglas
- Billinghausen Cuirassier
- Schulmann Cuirassier
- Pfuhl Cuirassier
- Mitzlaff Cuirassier
- Detachments: each regiment 40 musketeers and one light gun

Second Echelon (Major general Königsmarck)

- Seckendorf Cuirassier
- Tideman Cuirassier
- Lilliehöök Cuirassier

== Sources ==
- Elster, Otto (1903). Die Piccolomini-Regimenter während des 30-jährigen Krieges besonders das Kürassier-Regiment Alt-Piccolomini (PDF) (in German). Wien: L. W. Seidel & Sohn.
- Guthrie, William P. (2003). The Later Thirty Years War: From the Battle of Wittstock to the Treaty of Westphalia. Greenwood Press. ISBN 9780313324086.
- Murdoch, Steve; Grosjean, Alexia (2015). Alexander Leslie and the Scottish Generals of the Thirty Years' War, 1618–1648. Taylor & Francis. ISBN 9781317318156.
- Preil, Arndt (1990). Österreichs Schlachtfelder: Breitenfeld 1631, Lützen 1632, Breitenfeld 1642 (in German). H. Weishaupt. ISBN 9783900310592.
- Rudert, Otto (1937). Die Kämpfe um Leipzig im Großen Kriege: 1631–1642 (in German). Leipzig: Mattes.
- Schuster, O. (1885). Geschichte der sächsischen Armee: von deren Errichtung bis auf die neueste Zeit (in German). Leipzig: Duncker & Humblot.
- Warlich, Bernd (2009). "Madlo, Hans Georg". Der Dreißigjährige Krieg in Selbstzeugnissen, Chroniken und Berichten (in German).
- Warlich, Bernd (2010). "Pompeio, Tonio, Conte d'Ilassi". Der Dreißigjährige Krieg in Selbstzeugnissen, Chroniken und Berichten (in German).
- Warlich, Bernd (2012). "Callenberg, Kurt Reinecke I. Reichsgraf von". Der Dreißigjährige Krieg in Selbstzeugnissen, Chroniken und Berichten (in German).
- Warlich, Bernd (2012). "Mislík, Johann Sigismund Freiherr". Der Dreißigjährige Krieg in Selbstzeugnissen, Chroniken und Berichten (in German).
- Warlich, Bernd (2012). "Schlieben, Hans Heinrich von". Der Dreißigjährige Krieg in Selbstzeugnissen, Chroniken und Berichten (in German).
- Warlich, Bernd (2014). "Pestaluzzi, Paolo". Der Dreißigjährige Krieg in Selbstzeugnissen, Chroniken und Berichten (in German).
- Warlich, Bernd (2015). "Banér, Gustav". Der Dreißigjährige Krieg in Selbstzeugnissen, Chroniken und Berichten (in German).
- Warlich, Bernd (2015). "Münster, Christian von". Der Dreißigjährige Krieg in Selbstzeugnissen, Chroniken und Berichten (in German).
- Warlich, Bernd (2016). "Wittkopf, Johann". Der Dreißigjährige Krieg in Selbstzeugnissen, Chroniken und Berichten (in German).
- Warlich, Bernd (2020). "Ranfft von Wiesenthal, Johann Christoph Freiherr". Der Dreißigjährige Krieg in Selbstzeugnissen, Chroniken und Berichten (in German).
- Warlich, Bernd (2020). "Vorhauer, Johann von". Der Dreißigjährige Krieg in Selbstzeugnissen, Chroniken und Berichten (in German).
- Warlich, Bernd (2021). "Hanau, Augustin". Der Dreißigjährige Krieg in Selbstzeugnissen, Chroniken und Berichten (in German).
- Warlich, Bernd (2021). "Pallavicini, Sforza Marchese di, Duca di Stroppa". Der Dreißigjährige Krieg in Selbstzeugnissen, Chroniken und Berichten (in German).
- Warlich, Bernd (2021). "Warlowski von Warlow, Peter von". Der Dreißigjährige Krieg in Selbstzeugnissen, Chroniken und Berichten (in German).
- Warlich, Bernd (2022). "Fours, Johann Jakob Baron Des". Der Dreißigjährige Krieg in Selbstzeugnissen, Chroniken und Berichten (in German).
- Warlich, Bernd (2022). "Grodetzký von Grodetz, Georg Dietrich". Der Dreißigjährige Krieg in Selbstzeugnissen, Chroniken und Berichten (in German).
- Warlich, Bernd (2022). "Heister, Arnold von". Der Dreißigjährige Krieg in Selbstzeugnissen, Chroniken und Berichten (in German).
- Warlich, Bernd (2022). "Wachenheim, Otto Ludwig Freiherr von". Der Dreißigjährige Krieg in Selbstzeugnissen, Chroniken und Berichten (in German).
- Wrede, Alphons von (1898). Geschichte der K. und K. Wehrmacht II. Band. Aufgelöste Fuss-Truppen (in German). Wien: L. W. Seidel & Sohn.
- Wrede, Alphons von (1901). Geschichte der K. und K. Wehrmacht III. Band 1. Hälfte. Die Cavallerie (in German). Wien: L. W. Seidel & Sohn.
- Wrede, Alphons von (1901). Geschichte der K. und K. Wehrmacht III. Band 2. Hälfte. Aufgelöste Truppenkörper zu Pferd (in German). Wien: L. W. Seidel & Sohn.
