= Lilliehöök =

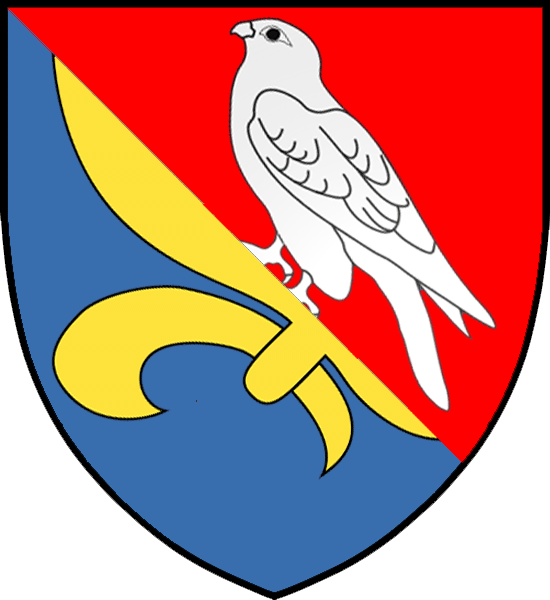
Coat of arms of the Lilliehöök noble family

Lilliehöök (pronounced [ˈlɪ̂lːjɛˌhøːk]) is a Swedish surname, chiefly borne by a Swedish noble family. Notable people with the surname include:

- Anna Lilliehöök (born 1947), Swedish politician
- Clara Sabina Lilliehöök (1686–1758), Swedish industrialist
- Ebba Lilliehöök (1529–1609), Swedish noblewoman, landlord and county administrator
- Gösta Lilliehöök (1871–1952), Swedish Army officer
- Gösta Lilliehöök (1884–1974), Swedish Army officer and modern pentathlete
- Johan Lilliehöök (1598–1642), Swedish general and nobleman.

== See also ==
- Lilliehöökbreen, a glacier complex in Svalbard, Norway
- Lilliehöökfjorden, a fjord branch in Svalbard, Norway
