= Slotsholmsgade =

Street in Copenhagen, Denmark

Coordinates: 55.6756°N 12.5825°E

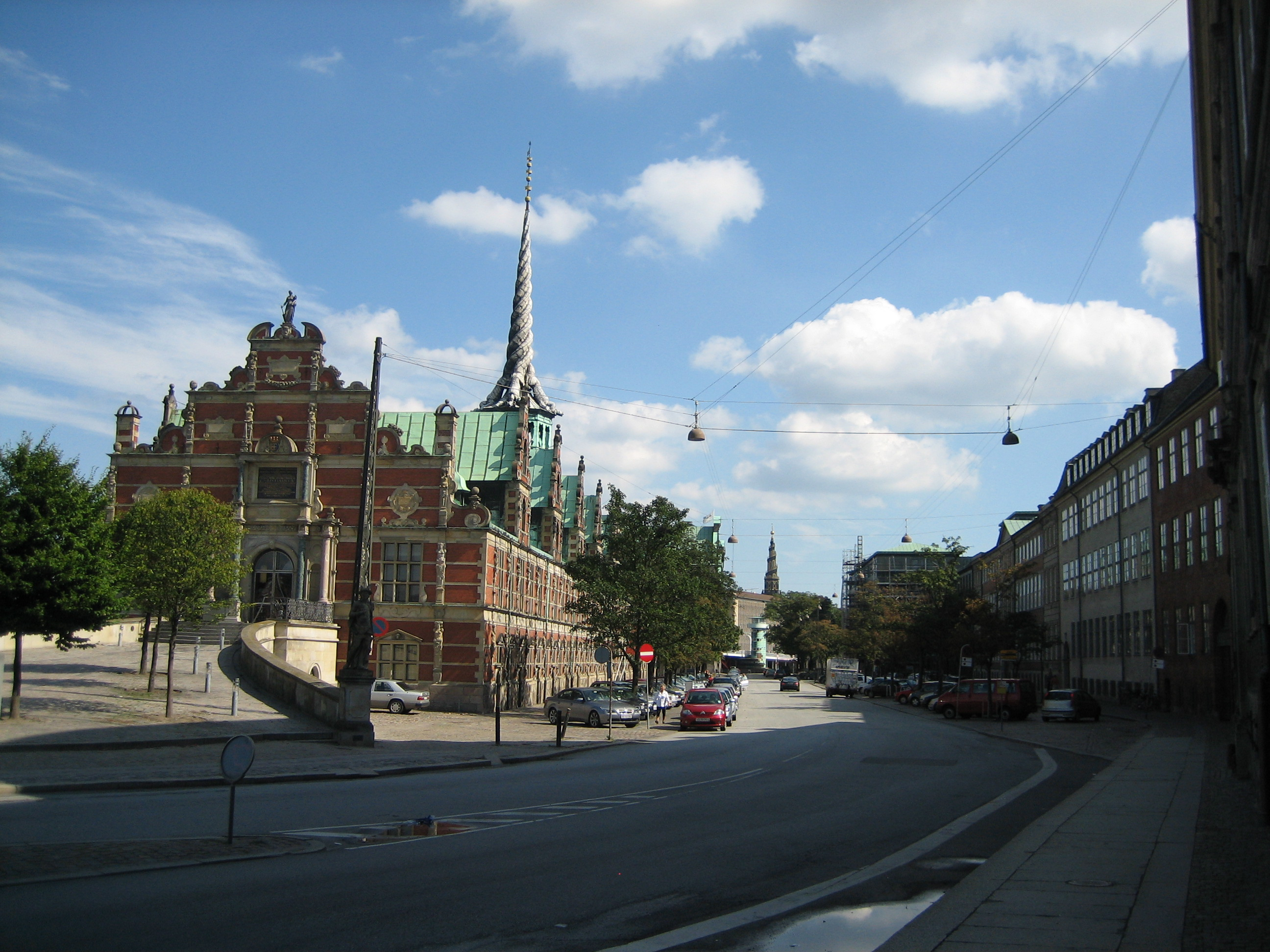
Slotsholmsgade

Slotsholmsgade (lit. "Slotsholm Street") is a street which runs along the rear side of Børsen on Slotsholmen in central Copenhagen, Denmark. Located next to the Danish parliament building Christiansborg, most of the buildings in the street house government offices. Several of them date from the 17th and 18th century and are listed.

== History ==
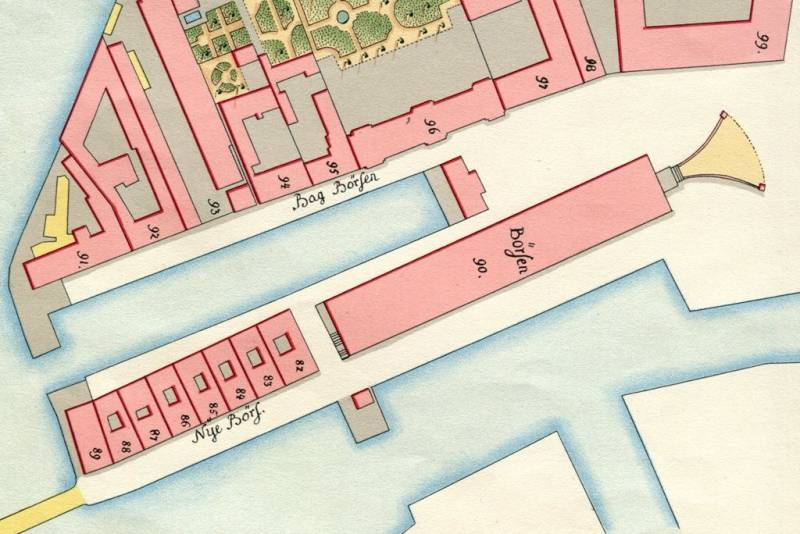
The Børs Dock and the street Bag Børsen as seen on Gedde's maps of Copenhagen from 1757

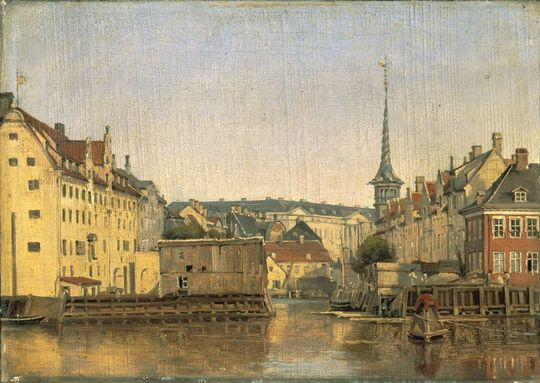
The Børs Dock in 1845

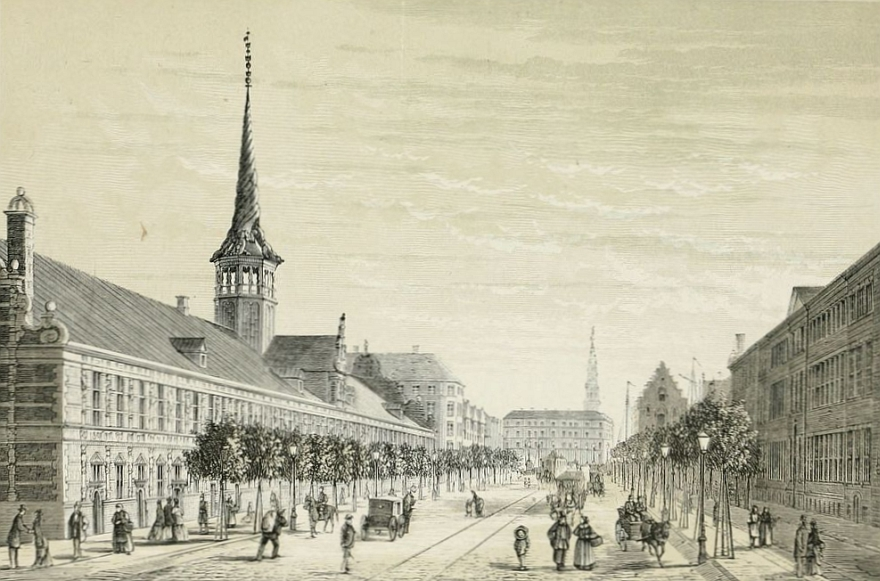
Slotsholmsgade

The street was originally the site of a dock, Børsgraven, which was created in connection with the construction of Børsen in the beginning of the 17th century. It made it possible for ships to unload goods close to the new market building. The street that ran along the north side of the dock was called Bag Børsen ("Behind Børsen").

A row of Renaissance-style merchant houses, known as Nye Børs (New Børs) or the Six Sisters, were built at the end of the Børs building. The residential front houses faced Børsgade while a row of associated warehouses faced the Børs Dock. The buildings were demolished in 1900 to make way for a new headquarters for Privatbanken. The Danish Africa company had established the Phønix sugar refinery at the mouth of the dock in 1657. It was taken over by De Danske Sukkerfabrikker in 1872 and remained in operations until 1888. The Italian alchemist Giuseppe Borri had his laboratory in the street before it moved to the so-called Garrison Hospital in Sølvgade in 1669.

The dock was filled in 1866.

== Notable buildings and residents ==
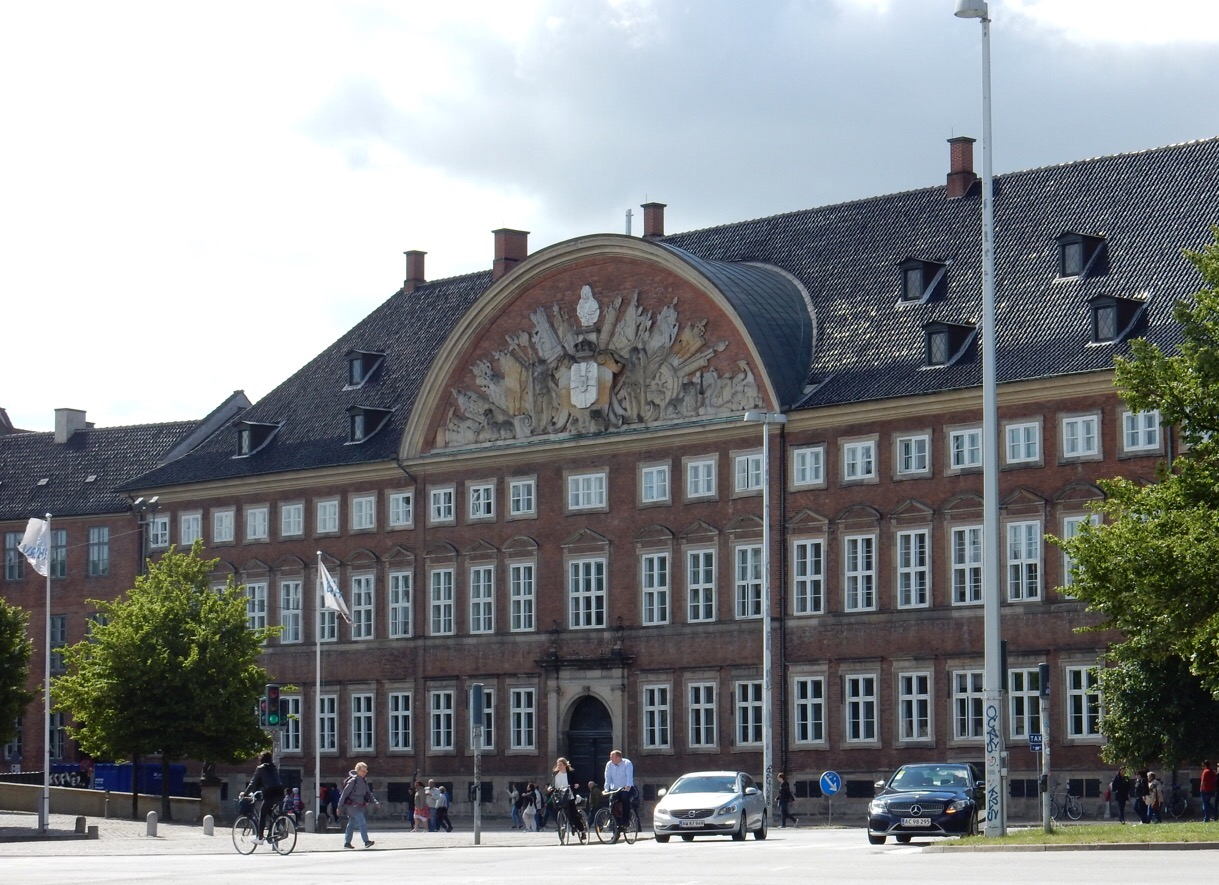
The Chancery Building

Børsen occupies most of the south side of the street. It now serves as headquarters for the Danish Chamber of Commerce.

The north side of the street (No. 4-10) is lined by a row of buildings from the late 17th to mid-18th century that are all listed. The most notable of these is the Chancery Building at nNo. 4, also known as the Red Mansion (Det Røde Palæ), which was built 1715–1720 to design by Johan Conrad Ernst. No. 6 is from 1783 and was designed by C. F. Harsdorff. The Storm House at No. 8, also known as the Anna Sophie Reventlow House, is from 1696 but has expanded to the west. The building later belonged to Frederick IV who used it first for his mistress Countess Schindel and later for his Morganatic wife Anne Sophie Reventlow.

The Lerche House at No. 10, also known as the Württemberg Mansion, is from 1741 to 1742 and was built by J. A. Soherr. It now houses the Ministry of Justice and part of the Ministry of Economic and Business Affairs.

The modern Tjæreborg complex (No. 12) replaced the sugar refinery in the 1960s. It was designed by Svenn Eske Kristensen and Thomas Havning and currently houses the Ministry of Environment and Food and part of the Ministry of Economic and Business Affairs.

== Cultural references ==
- Slotsholmsgade is used as a location at 1:30:28 in the 1974 Olsen-banden film The Last Exploits of the Olsen Gang.

== See also ==
- Holmens Kanal
