= Battle of Breitenfeld =

There were two battles of Breitenfeld during the Thirty Years' War:

- Battle of Breitenfeld (1631)
- Battle of Breitenfeld (1642)
