= Frederica Louise Ernst =

Danish slave trader and ship owner (1714–1781)

Frederica (Frederikke) Louise Ernst (1714–1781) was a Danish merchant, ship owner and slave trader.

== Early life and background ==
Ernst was born in 1714 in Copenhagen, the daughter of architect and government official Johan Conrad Ernst and Magdalene Foss. Her maternal grandfather was rector of the Metropolitan School Peder Nielsen Foss (1631–1698). Her paternal uncle Johan Bertram Ernst served as chief of police in Copenhagen. Her two elder brothers, Carl Ernst Ernst (born 1705) and Frederik Christian Ernst (born 1708), died young.

== Career ==
Being an unmarried woman, she was legally under the guardianship of her closest male relative for life. In 1758, however, she successfully applied for legal majority. She was a successful businesswoman and invested in a number of businesses: she owned shares of a warehouse, ships and a sugar plantation on Danish St. Croix. She was also involved in the Danish slave trade. In 1765, she founded a factory for the cleaning and combing of flax and hemp. This was an innovation in Denmark, involving machinery advanced for its time. Initially successful, in 1772, she tried to recoup her loans, but her money was tied up in the West Indies. This was a setback, and by the time of her death in 1781, she had lost most of her money. Ernst was rare as a female industrialist in Denmark, at the time, but she was particularly rare because she was unmarried: almost all businesswomen in Denmark of the time, especially within bigger business, were widows or married women who had their husband's permission to be involved in business; unmarried businesswomen were very few.

== See also ==
- Charlotta Richardy
- Maria Augustin
