= Charlotta Richardy =

Swedish industrialist

Christina Charlotta Richardy (1751–1831) was a Swedish industrialist.

== Life ==
She was born to the judge Albrecht Friedrich Richardson, mayor of Halmstad. Richardy never married and remained a mamsell. While unmarried women, in accordance with the Civil Code of 1734, were legal minors under the guardianship of their closest male relative for life, they had the right to petition for legal majority to the monarch, which was a common procedure for unmarried businesswomen. Richardy had herself declared of legal majority by a petition to Gustav III of Sweden in 1786 and, being now free to manage her own affairs, engaged in business.

=== Fish trade ===
Halmstad was at the time a major Staple right city. Richardy engaged in the fish trade and had fresh Salmonidae bought, smoked and sold, a lucrative trade which put her in conflict with the Halmstad city guild. Because of her verbal defense in court, the guild were unable to have her business closed down. Instead, she applied to be a member of the guild in accordance with the law of 1720 års skråordning. After the guild refused to admit her as a member, she protested by petition to the monarch. The King refused to meddle in the affair, but Richardy eventually won the conflict and managed to win membership in the Halmstad city guild. As she often traveled alone around the Halland country side in business, she carried a pistol with her for self-protection, which was well known.

=== Textile industry ===
In 1800, Charlotta Richardy became the first female member of the Royal Patriotic Society, where she participated actively in the effort of the society to promote agriculture and industry. She was elected in part because of her effort as a provider of boots and stockings to the army.

Richardy took over the old contract of the Vallen Castle manufacture to provide woolen stockings and boots for the Swedish Army, which had belonged to the family of Birgitta Durell for over a century prior. From 1805 until 1822, she managed her own factory on her farm Tolarp in Snöstorp just outside the city of Halmstad. To fulfill her contract, she was given permission to import and sell wool from Copenhagen. Outside of those employed in her factory, she distributed wool for the manufacture of socks at home among the peasantry of the area, and she sidestepped the shoemaker guild in Halmstad by engaging the shoemakers in the surrounding country side to make her boots. She also bought the cloth produced by at home by the surrounding peasantry and sold to the army. Richardy and her factory enjoyed great success as the provider of foot wear for the army during the wars of the time, such as the Finnish War. In 1810, she was granted funds from the manufacture state fund to expand in recognition of her great contribution to the employment of the workforce in the region. She is regarded a pioneer in the region, were following textile factory owners continued to hire peasantry to work from home after her example.

Carl Christoffer Gjörwell Sr. described her as a:

"... manly lady of imposing height and strong powers and the attitude of a man. She is a woman of about fifty, lives in Halmstad, manage trade and commerce and often travels up [to the capital] to control her business with His Majesty and the Crown. I have never seen her equal, will not forget our first conversation, the brave look, the straight arm, the famed Pistol..."

== See also ==
- Frederica Louise Ernst
- Maria Augustin
