= Lerche House =

Listed building in Slotsholmsgade, Denmark

- Lerches Gård
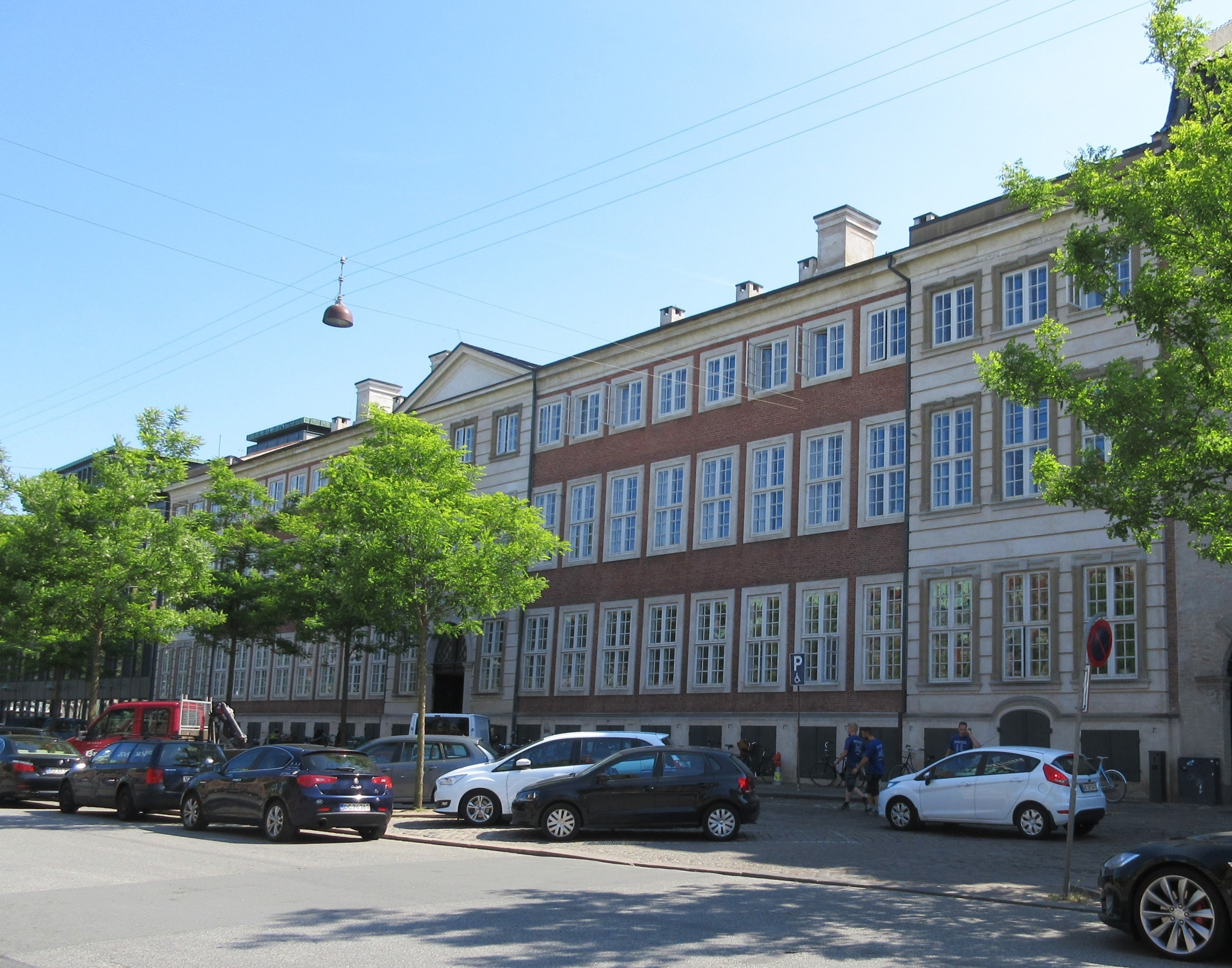
- Interactive map of the Lerche House area

General information
- Architectural style: Rococo
- Location: Slotsholmsgade 10, Copenhagen, Denmark
- Coordinates: 55°40′30.29″N 12°35′1.48″E
- Construction started: 1741
- Completed: 1744

The LercheHouse (Danish: Den Lercheske Gård), also known as the Lerche Mansion (Lerches Palæ) and formerly as the Württembergsk Mansion (Württembergske Palæ), is a listed building in Slotsholmsgade on the island of Slotsholmen in central Copenhagen, Denmark.

== History ==
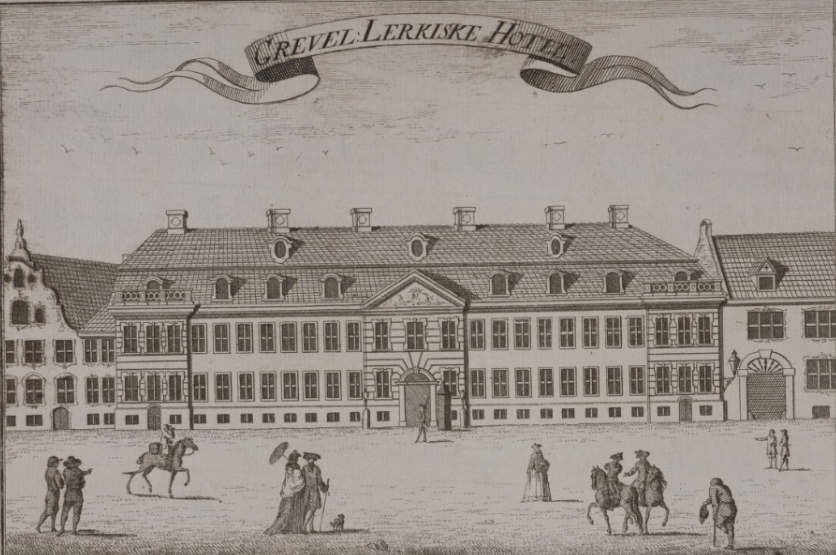
The Lerche House in 1762

The Württembergske Mansion was built by Christian VI in 1741–44 as residence for Charles Christian Erdmann, Prince of Württemberg-Oels. He was one of the many relatives of Queen Sophie Magdalene, who came to Denmark in the years after 1730 and belonged to the inner circle around the king. The architect was af arkitekten Johann Soherr (died 1778).

Floor plan and facade drawing of the building in the yard

Württembergske left the country when Christian VI died in 1747 and the house was then purchased by general Christian Lerche (1692–1757). It was later passed on to his son and grandson.

The building was expanded with an extra floor when it was acquired by the Danish state to make room for the growing central administration in 1805.

== Architecture ==
The building is 25 bays long and designed in Rococo style. Among the partly surviving interiors is a dining room with murals and door pieces by Jacob Fabris.

== Today ==
The building is now home to the Minister for Immigration and Integration. Prior to the 2015 Danish general election, it housed the Ministry of Economy.
