= Storm House, Copenhagen =

Building in Copenhagen

Storm House
- Den Stormske Gård
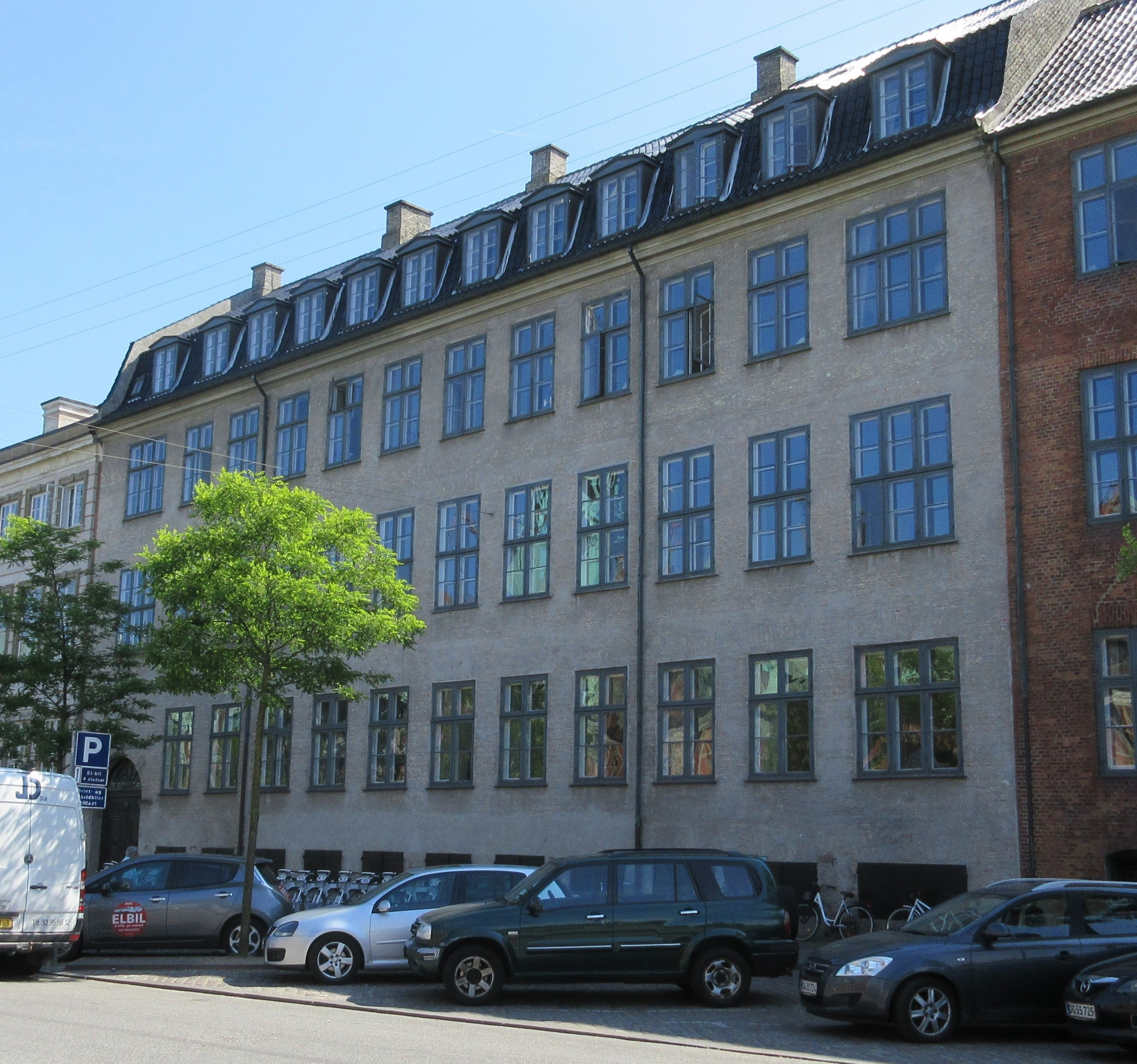
- The Storm House viewed from across the street
- Interactive map of the Storm House area

General information
- Architectural style: Neoclassical
- Location: Copenhagen, Denmark
- Coordinates: 55°40′30.91″N 12°34′59.24″E
- Completed: 1686

The Storm House (Danish: Den Stormske Gård), also known as Anna Sophie Reventlow House, is a listed property in Slotsholmsgade on the island of Slotsholmen in central Copenhagen, Denmark.

== History ==
The house was built in 1696 but was later expanded to the west. The building later belonged to Frederick IV, who used it first for his mistress Countess Schindel and later for his morganatic wife Anne Sophie Reventlow.

The building was taken over by the central administration in 1731. It was connected to the Chancellery House in 1781 and also expanded with an extra floor for the Rentekammeret. The building was listed in 1945.

== Today ==
The building currently houses part of the Ministry of Finance.
