= Maria Augustin =

Maria Augustin (1749-1803) was a Finnish businessperson. She is known for the many legal cases based on her right to conduct business as an unmarried woman.

== Life ==
She was the daughter of Mathias Augustin the Elder. Her father owned one of the biggest shipping trading houses in Turku. It foremost exported salt and iron to Sweden.

=== Heiress ===
Her brother, Mathias Augustin the Younger, left the family firm in 1771 to start his own company, having no further interest in his father's business, and Maria Augustin was fully trained by her father to succeed him as his heir. Because a married woman was a minor under the guardianship of her husband, Maria Augustin chose to remain unmarried in order to be able to succeed her father as the head of the firm.

In 1775, her father retired, and left her to manage the firm by her own. Being an unmarried woman, she was legally under the guardianship of her closest male relative for life. Her father, however, supported her in her successful application to the king for legal majority. However, she still needed a permit from the city guilds to conduct business within the city of Turku. This was not an issue as long as she managed the business in her father's name.

=== Court case of 1790 ===
In 1790 her father formally retired, resigned his guild membership and transferred his business to his daughters name. This created a conflict with the authorities of Turku. The city authorities of Turku refused to grant Maria Augustin a business permit on the grounds that she was unmarried. Business permits and guild memberships were normally only issued to men, or to widows who had inherited their businesses and guild memberships from their late husbands. While unmarried women were often given dispensations from these regulations, these dispensations were normally only issued to unmarried women in desperate circumstances to manage a small business for their personal support, and this was in no way applicable to Maria Augustin, who managed the second largest shipping firm in the city. Eventually, Maria Augustin was given a dispensation to managed the business for her father until his death. She was one of the richest business people in Finland, and was taxed the same way as a male member of the guild in her position would have been.

=== Court case of 1791 ===
In 1791, Mathias Augustin the Elder died, and Maria Augustin again came in to conflict with the Turku city authorities who questioned her right to manage the business she inherited from her late father with on the grounds that business permits were normally only issued to women who inherited their business from their husbands, not from their fathers. In 1792, she was finally granted a business permit from Turku, but only for the time period of one year. This time, she applied directly to the Swedish Royal Crown. In 1793, the king granted her dispensation to manage her father's business for life. Later the year, she was finally granted a guild membership from the Turku city guild, and was able to conduct her business without dispensation and on the same terms as a man, regardless of her unmarried status.

== See also ==
- Frederica Louise Ernst
- Charlotta Richardy
