= Johan Bertram Ernst =

Danish chief of police (1663–1722)

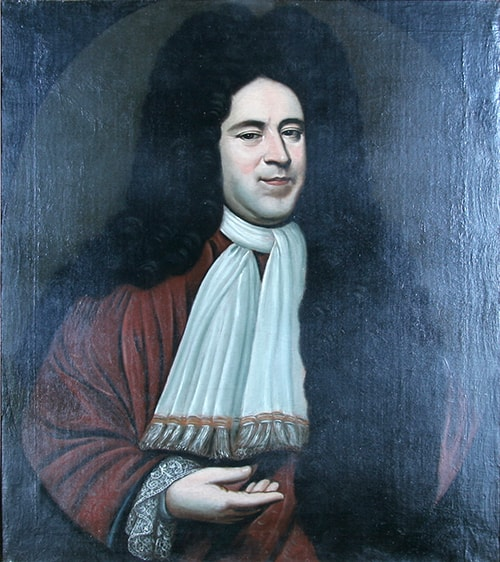
- Portrait of Ernst in Copenhagen Police Headquarters.

Chief of Copenhagen Police Force
- In office 1710–1722
- Monarch: Frederick IV of Denmark
- Preceded by: Ole Rømer
- Succeeded by: Johan Philip Ratecken
- Constituency: Copenhagen Police Force

Personal details
- Born: 30 October 1663 Copenhagen, Denmark-Norway
- Died: 22 December 1722 (aged 59) Copenhagen, Denmark
- Occupation: Chief of police

Johan Bartram (Bartram) Ernst (30 October 1663 - 22 December 1722) served as chief of police in Copenhagen from 1610 to 1722. He was the elder brother of royal master builder Johan Conrad Ernst.

== Early life and education ==
Ernst was born on 30 October 1663 in Copenhagen, the second of five children of linen merchant Johan Adolph Ernst (died1676) and Helene Sophie Mercker (died 1715). He was the elder brother of architect Johan Conrad Ernst. Their father has immigrated from Nuremberg. He was admitted to the Merchants Gild in Copenhagen in 1742 and became one of the city's 32 ;em in 1659. He owned a property on Amagertorv (now Amagertorv 31). After the father's death, Ernst's mother married secondly to merchant Barthold Stuve (c. 1626–1702). This marriage resulted in two half brothers and a half sister.

Ernst completed his schooling 1681. He was educated in Germany, Italy, France, Netherlands and England. Not long after returning to Copenhagen, he went abroad again as hoffmeister for young noblemen. Back in Denmark, he served as tutor for Prince Christian, second-eldest son of king Christian V. In 1695, he accompanied the prince on a journey to Germany where the prince died.

== Career ==
In 1697, Ernst was employed at Hofretten. In 1701, he became assistant for Claus Rasch. Drom 1703, he concurrently served as deputy borgermaster and, after some time, as burgermaster. In 1705, he was bypassed for the position as chief of police when Ole Rømer was appointed Raschas' successor, both as chief of police and 1st burgermaster. Ernst was also responsible for the creation of Christian V's Tage-Register, a chronological catalogue of the most important events during the king's reignm which was published anonymously in 1701.

At Rømer's death in 1710, Ernst was finally appointed as chief of police. The 1711 Copenhagen Plague Outbreak, which killed approximately 20,000 people, resulted in chaotic conditions in the city. On 8 November 1708, Ernst was first informed about the outbreak of plague in Helsingør. He immediately informed the Politi' og Kommercekollegium9. Tsar Peter the Great's visit in 1716 was another event which made Ernst's work difficult. Many wealthy citizens were ordered to contribute with supplies to the Russian visitors. Ernst's work was also made difficult by the many clashes between Russian soldiers and lackeys and Danish soldiers and civilians.

== Personal life ==
Ernst was married to Vilhelmine Justine Dotzem (died 1741), a daughter of Just Dotzem. He belonged to the city's German congregation at St. Peter's Church. He died on 22 December 1722. He was survived by two daughters. The elder daughter Christiane Sophie Ernst (1711–1771) was married twice, first to Marcus Fogh til Brobygaard (1699–1762) and then to Albrecht Christopher Schaffalitzky de Muckadell (1720–1797). Neither of her two marriages produced any issue. The younger daughter Helene Justine Ernst (1714–1781) remained unmarried. She created a grant for 10 poor unmarried women with a capital of 10,000 Danish rigsdaler.

== Awards ==
Ernst was appointed Kancelliråd in 1701, Justitsråd in 1704 and Etatsråd in 1717.
