= Johan Lilliehöök =

Swedish nobleman and general (1598–1642)

Johan Nilsson Lilliehöök
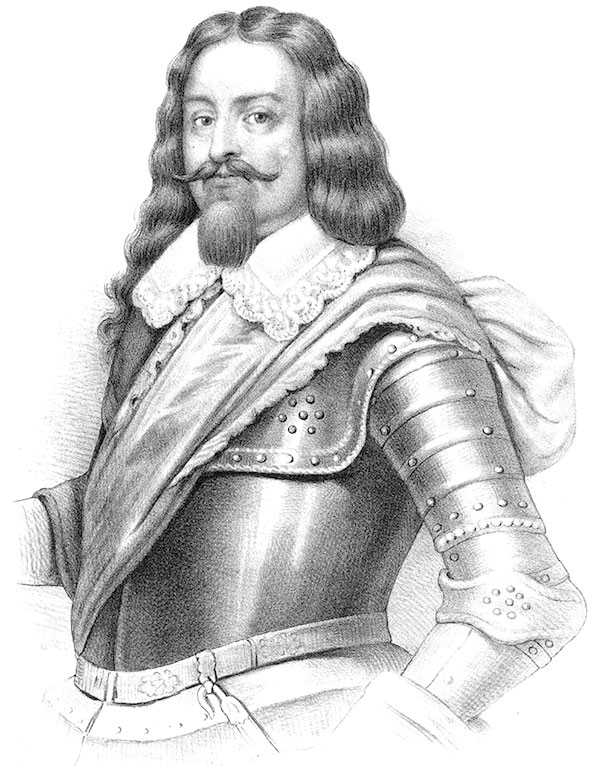
- 1849 lithograph of Johan Lilliehöök
- Born: 1598; Fårdala, Sweden
- Died: 23 October 1642 (aged 44); Leipzig, Electorate of Saxony
- Spouse(s): Kristina Hästehufvud; Ingeborg Bååt; Christina Ulfsparre af Broxvik
- Relatives: Lilliehöök family
- Military career
- Allegiance: (yes) Swedish Empire
- Rank: General of the Infantry; Master-General of the Ordnance (Riksfälttygsmästare)
- Commands: Pori Regiment (1628–1630); Västgöta Regiment (1631); Västmanland Regiment (1632); Garrison of Riga (1633); Swedish Army in Germany (Deputy, 1641)
- Conflicts: Thirty Years' War; Siege of Landsberg (1639) (WIA); Battle of Breitenfeld (1642) †

Johan Nilsson Lilliehöök af Fårdala (1598 – 23 October 1642) was a Swedish nobleman and general who served during the Thirty Years' War. He became the Master-General of the Ordnance (Riksfälttygsmästare) and General of the Infantry serving as second-in-command to Field Marshal Lennart Torstenson. He was mortally wounded while commanding the Swedish center at the Second Battle of Breitenfeld in 1642.

== Early life ==
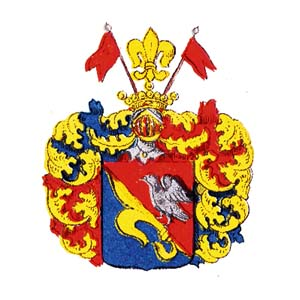
Coat of arms of the family branch Lilliehöök af Fårdala (No. 1).

Johan Lilliehöök was born in 1598 at Fårdala, 15 kilometres east of Falköping, to Nils Andersson Lilliehöök and Brita Hand. He was born into the noble Lilliehöök family, specifically the Lilliehöök af Fårdala branch of the family.

In 1608, Lilliehöök began his education at Uppsala University. Once he had finished his education, in 1615 he entered the royal service as a courtier in King Gustavus Adolphus's Life Guards.

== Early career ==
Lilliehöök rose through military ranks during Gustavus Adolphus's campaigns in Livonia, Poland, and Prussia. In 1618, he was commissioned as an ensign and by 1625 he had been promoted to lieutenant-colonel. In the same year, following a drawing of lots at the newly established House of Nobility (Riddarhuset), the Lilliehöök af Fårdala branch of the family were introduced under no. 1 within the knights class.

== Regimental commands and governance ==
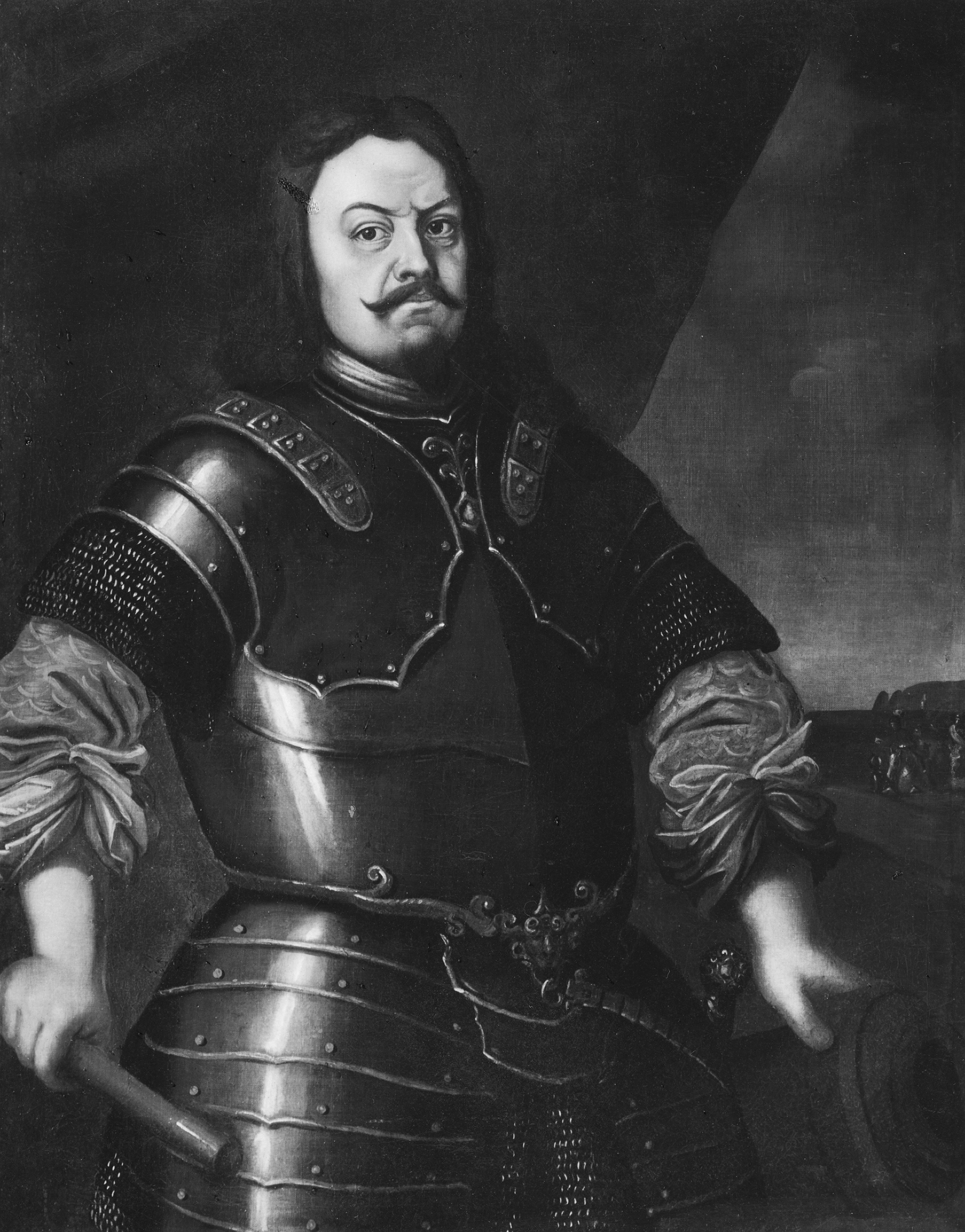
Oil portrait of Johan Lilliehöök, preserved in the Nationalmuseum collection.

As the Thirty Years' War raged on, Lilliehöök was given colonelcy over several regiments. From 1628 to 1630, he was the colonel of the Björneborgs regiment. In 1631, he served as the colonel of the Västgöta Regiment and in the next year he was made colonel of the Västmanland Regiment.

In October 1633, Lilliehöök was appointed Inspector of the garrison in Riga, followed by civic administrative appointments as District Governor of Hammarkind and Sundal in 1634 and 1637 respectively. He was promoted to Major General of the Infantry in Livonia in 1635 and transferred to Germany in 1636. In 1638 he was appointed governor of Hinterpommern, and commandant of Stettin. In 1639, he led an incursion into Silesia, where at the Siege of Landsberg, he broke one of his legs.

In 1641, Lilliehöök was made deputy field commander of the army in Germany. During Johan Banér's illness the Privy Council of Sweden (Riksråd) decided that Lilliehöök would succeed him as Field Marshal. However, upon Banér's death in May 1641, he was succeeded by Lennart Torstenson and Lilliehöök would be Torstensson's second in command.

== Battle of Breitenfeld and death ==
In March 1642, Lilliehöök was appointed Master-General of the Ordnance (Riksfälttygsmästare), a position second in command to the Field Marshal, Lennart Torstenson.

On October 23, 1642, during the Second Battle of Breitenfeld, Lilliehöök commanded the Swedish center. In an effort to support Arvid Wittenberg's attack, he was struck by a musket shot.

When the battle was over, Carl Gustav, Count Palatinate was rushed to see the mortally wounded general and said "We have won, Lilliehöök, and that through you!". Lilliehöök replied in a weak voice, "Then I will die satisfied. God bless you and my fatherland through you." Later in the day Lilliehöök would succumb to his wounds. Lilliehöök was buried at Saint John's Church in Norrköping.

== Personal life ==
Lilliehöök was married three times. His first marriage was in 1628, followed by his second marriage in 1632, and his final marriage in 1637.

- Kristina Hästehufvud (1614–1629), daughter of Anders Eriksson Hästehufvud. Died one year into their marriage.
- Ingeborg Bååt (1614–1635), daughter of vice president Jakob Jakobsson Snakenborg (Bååt). Died in Riga.
- Christina Ulfsparre af Broxvik (died 1684), daughter of Governor Erik Göransson Ulfsparre.

Lilliehöök had 3 children with Ingeborg Bååt before her death in 1635.

- Baron Jakob Lilliehöök (25 May 1633 – 3 October 1657), attained the rank of Major in the Swedish army before his death at the hands of Danes aged 24.
- Brita Lilliehöök (19 December 1634 – 10 July 1636), died in infancy in Riga.
- Baron Anders Lilliehöök (19 December 1635 – 17 November 1685), governor and diplomat.

Following the death of his second wife, Lilliehöök married Christina Ulfsparre af Broxvik in 1637 and had 3 children with her.

- Baroness Ingeborg Lilliehöök (16 September 1639 – 23 January 1675), married Field Marshal Göran Sperling.
- Johan Lilliehöök (1641 – 10 February 1648), died at age 7, shot dead by an angry mob in Uppsala.
- Baroness Beata Lilliehöök (1642–1671), married Nils Nilsson Natt och Dag.

== Legacy ==
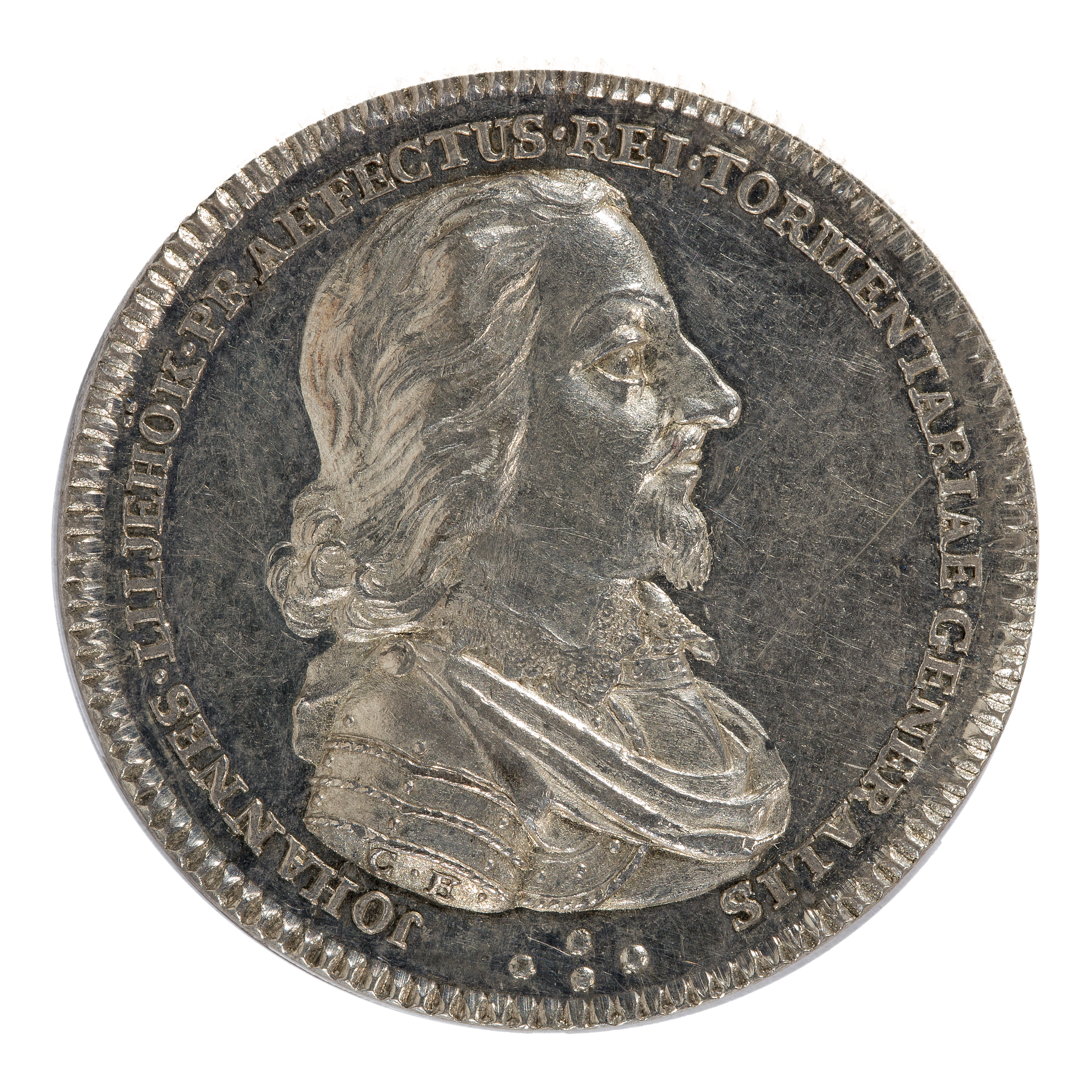
Obverse: Profile bust of Johan Lilliehöök.

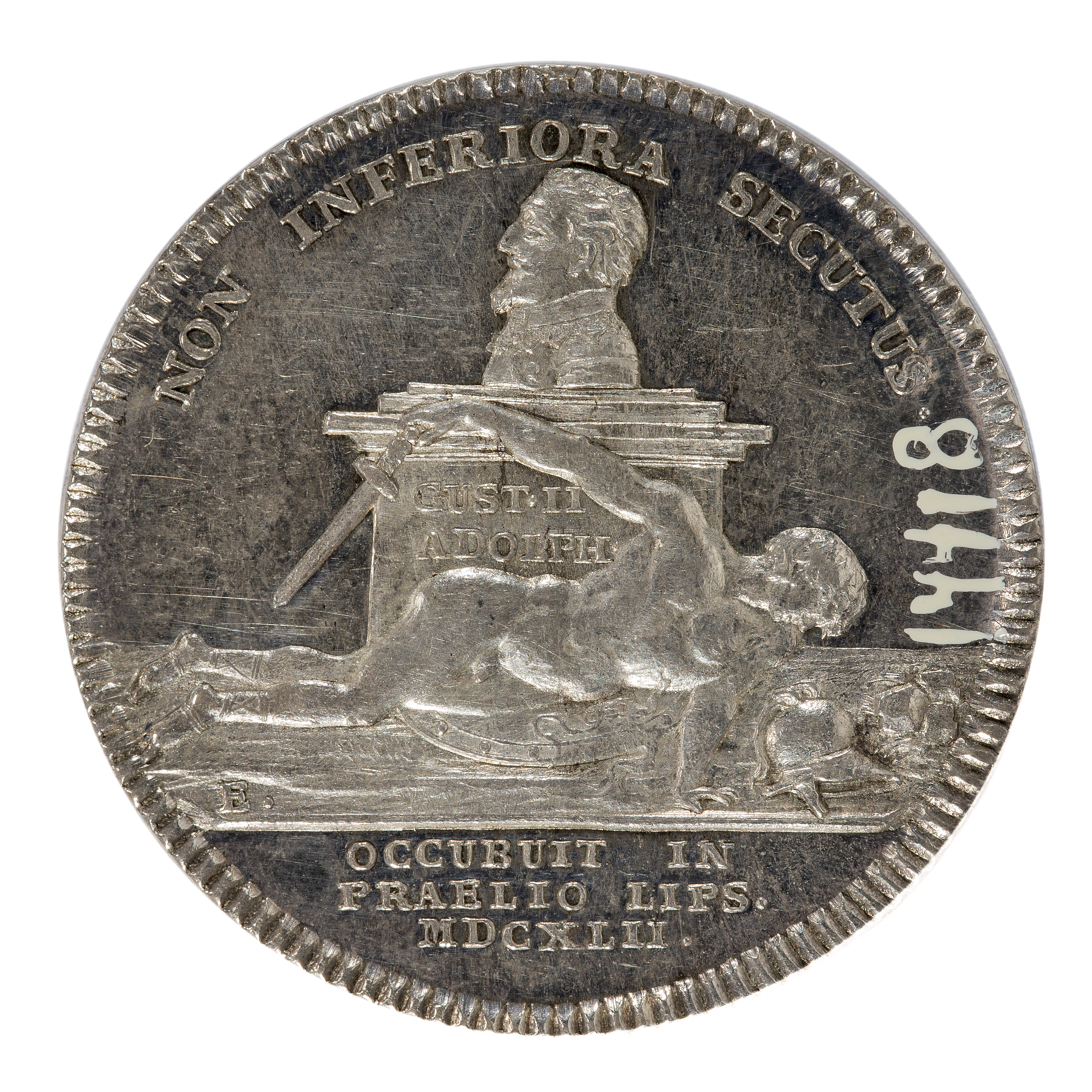
Reverse: Bust of King Gustavus Adolphus and falling warrior.

In 1651, his surviving sons and daughters were raised to the baronial families class in the Swedish House of Nobility as the no. 13 Lilliehöök. However, the line went extinct when Anders Lilliehöök died in 1685 without any surviving male heirs.

The Swedish Academy later honored Lilliehöök's memory by striking a commemorative coin designed by Frans Michael Franzén. The obverse features a bust of Lilliehöök, while the reverse depicts a bust of Gustavus Adolphus looking down at a dying warrior.
