= Breitenfeld, Leipzig =

Breitenfeld
- Stadtteil of Leipzig
- Interactive map of Breitenfeld
- Location within Germany Location within Saxony
- Coordinates: 51°24′10″N 12°20′40″E
- Country: Germany
- State: Saxony
- District: Urban district
- City: Leipzig
- Time zone: UTC+01:00 (CET)
  - Summer (DST): UTC+02:00 (CEST)
- Vehicle registration: L
- Website: www.leipzig.de

Breitenfeld (German pronunciation: [ˈbʁaɪtn̩ˌfɛlt]) is a village in Germany, incorporated into the city of Leipzig since 1999. It lies 8 kilometres (5.0 mi) north of the city centre, near the old road to Landsberg. To the south, it borders the suburbanised villages of Lindenthal and Wiederitzsch; to the north it is bordered by the autobahn A14. It was the site of the Battle of Breitenfeld (1631), an important Swedish-Protestant victory in the Thirty Years' War.

== History ==
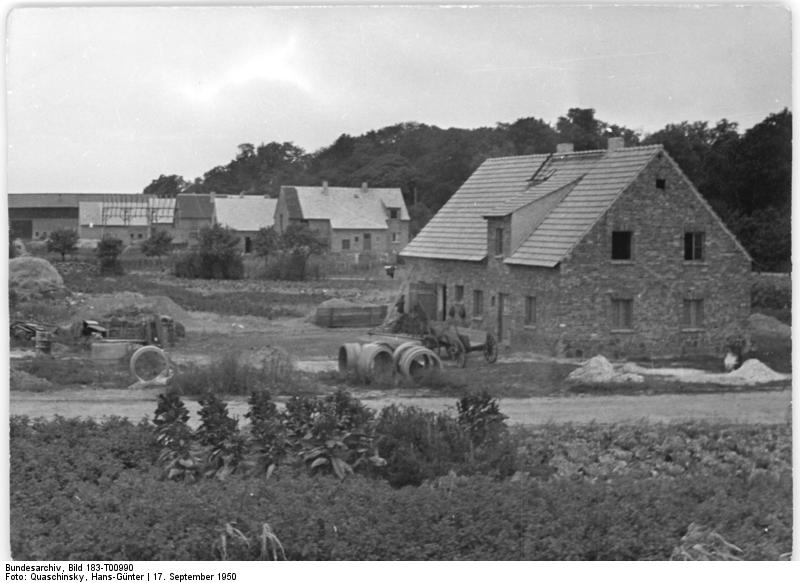
Reconstruction of destroyed farms and houses, 1950. Photo by Hans-Gunter Quarschinsky, 1950

Breitenfeld was first mentioned in documents in 1271, as part of the estate of the Margrafs of Landsberg. When the elder Dietrich of Landsberg died, his illegitimate son, Dietrich II, inherited the property. The property of Breitenfeld, which included Wiederitzsch and Lindenthal, came under the legal jurisdiction of the Bishopric of Merseburg. After the Reformation, Breitenfeld came into the possession of different Saxon noble families. These occupants were counted among the Saxon noble houses, and usually had their seat at Landsberg.

During the Thirty Years War, in 1631, in the Battle of Breitenfeld (1631), an alliance of Saxon and Swedish forces, under the command of Gustavus II Adolphus, the king of Sweden, with additional Protestant-German allies and mercenaries, defeated the armies of the Catholic League and the Habsburgs, commanded by Johann Tserclaes, Count of Tilly. In 1642, in a second Battle of Breitenfeld (1642), the troops of Sweden and Saxony again defeated the imperial troops.

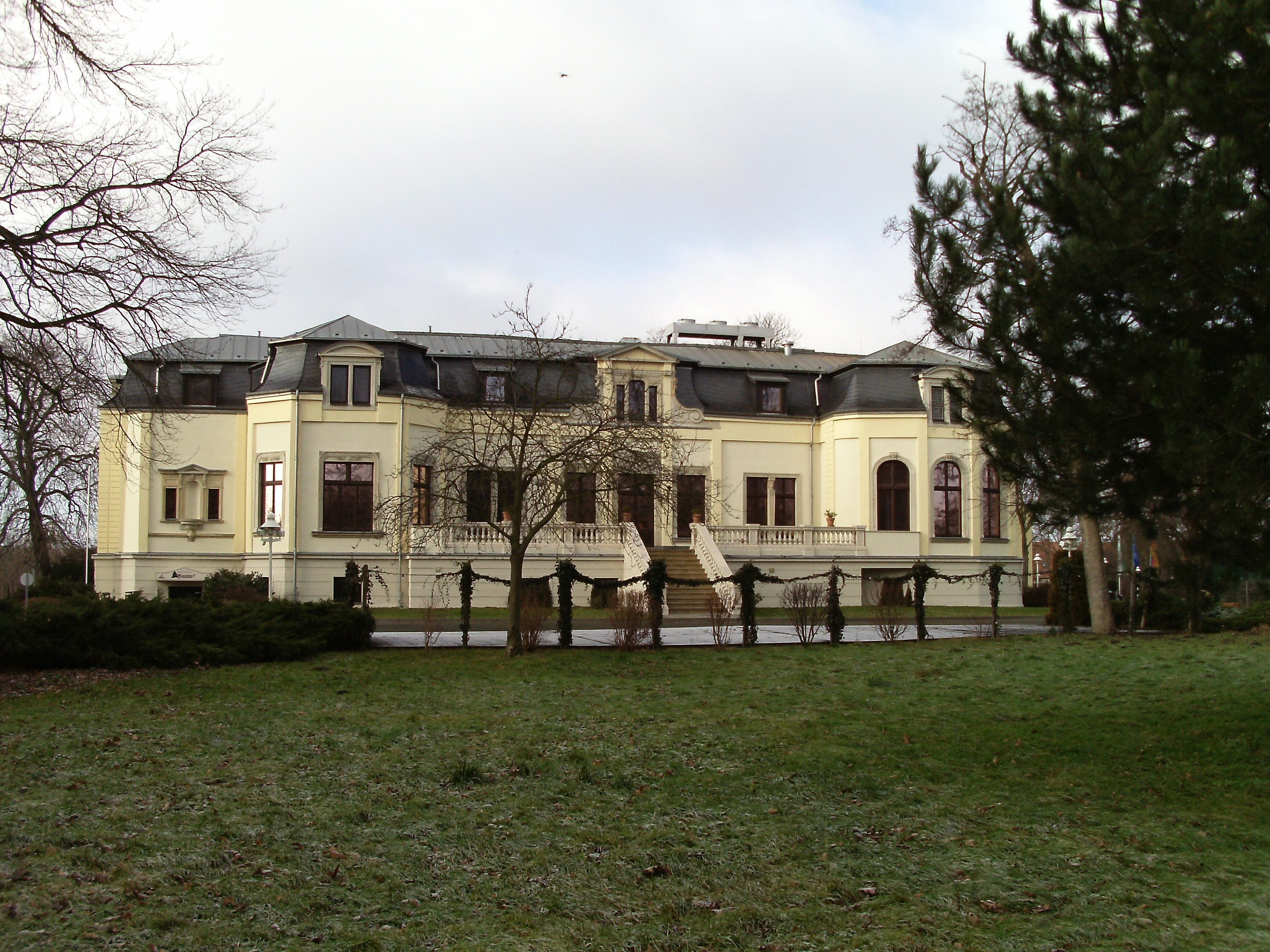
Manor of the Breitenfeld estate

At the Battle of the Nations in 1813, the Prussian general Gebhard Leberecht von Blücher established his command post in the Breitenfeld mill, from which he coordinated the attacks on Napoleon's French troops positioned in Möckern and Gohlis.

In 1856, the patrimonial authority was relinquished and Breitenfeld acquired local autonomy within the duchy of Saxony, as a community with its own village council. In 1923, the village formed part of the conjoined community of Lindenthal, and in 1999, joined with the city of Leipzig. Since 2002, Breitenfeld has been the main home of the Leipzig animal rescue, and the city's fairgrounds and exhibition hall is located at the village.

=== Battle Monument ===
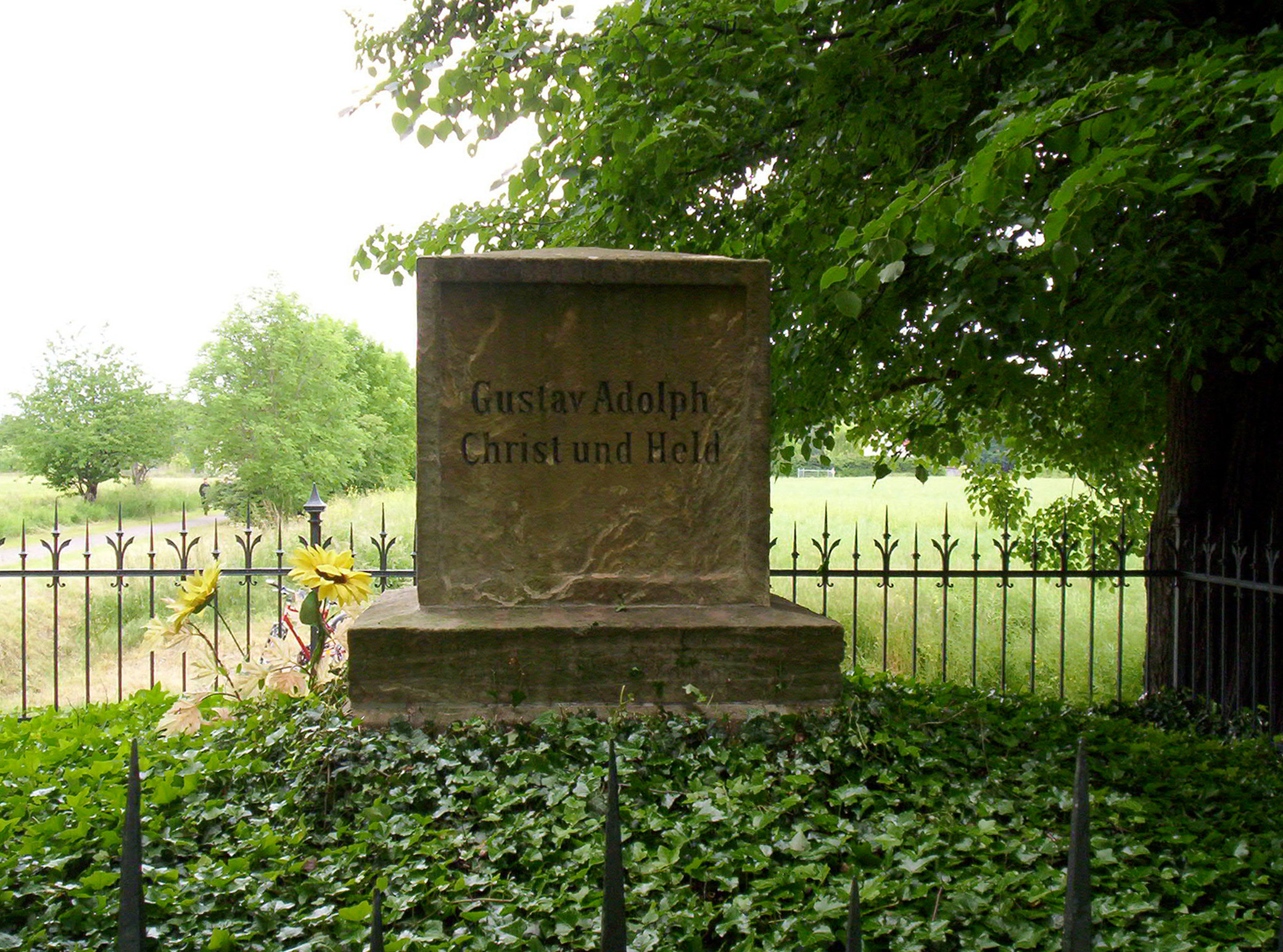
Monument commemorating the Battle of Breitenfeld

In the eastern portion of the village, a monument to Gustav Adolf reminds viewers of the Battle of Breitenfeld in 1631. It was erected in 1831 on the two hundredth anniversary of the battle and bears the following inscription:

Glaubensfreiheit für die Welt,
rettete bei Breitenfeld
Gustav Adolf, Christ und Held.

Translation:

Freedom of belief for the world,
saved at Breitenfeld,
Gustavus Adolphus, Christian and hero.
