= Annibale Gonzaga =

Austrian field marshal (1602–1668)

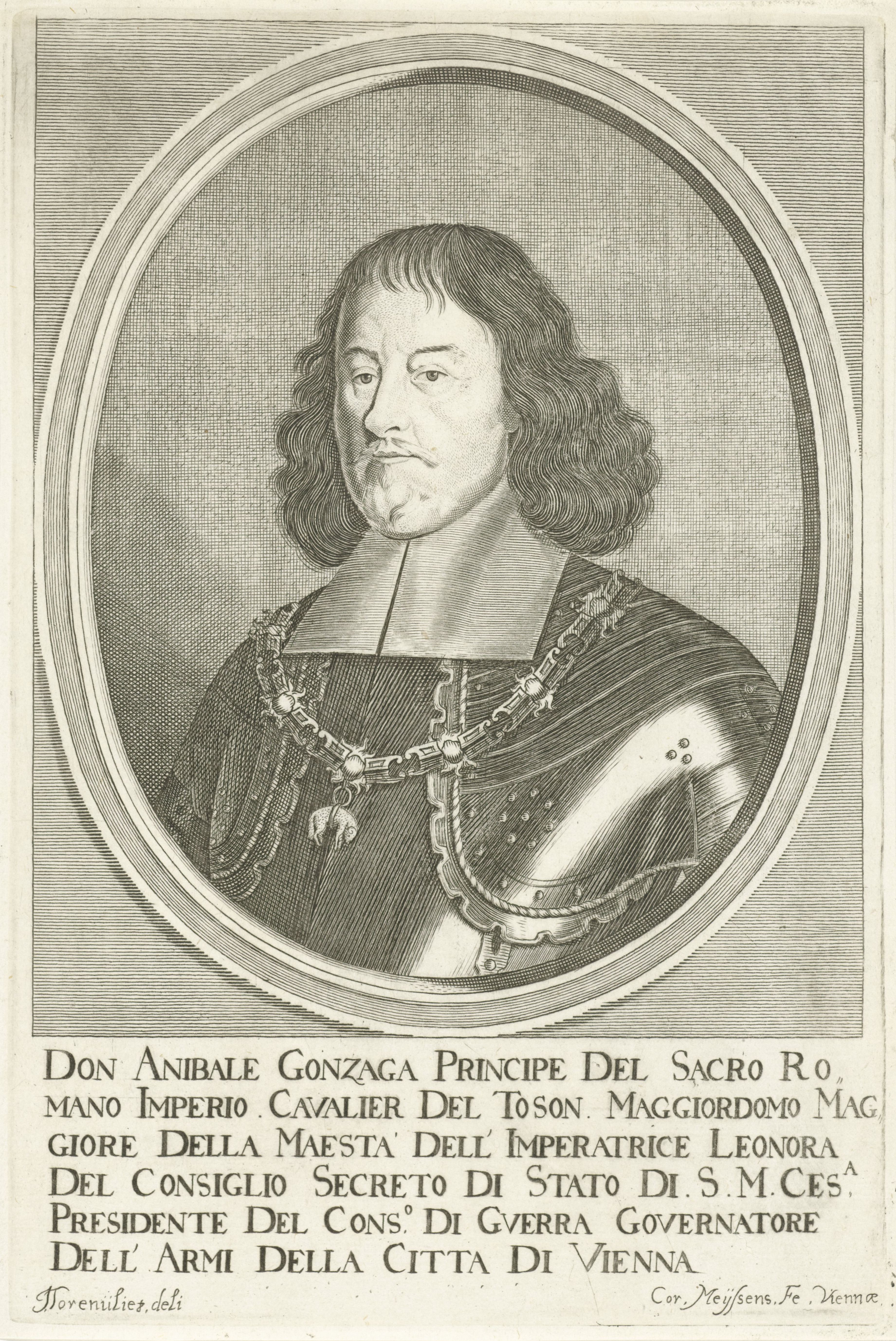
Annibale Gonzaga

Annibale Gonzaga (1602 – Vienna, 2 August 1668) was commander of the city of Vienna, imperial field marshal and president of the Hofkriegsrat.

== Life ==
He was the son of Ferrante de Gazzuolo and Isabella Gonzaga, and thus a member of the Italian ducal family Gonzaga.

He joined the Imperial army. In 1634 he was already colonel of a regiment. He rose quickly through the ranks, partly by his competences, partly by his family name (His relative Eleonora Gonzaga was the Holy Roman Empress, and wife of Emperor Ferdinand II). Gonzaga was one of the commanders at the Battle of Nördlingen (1634). In 1640, he became commander of the city of Vienna. Two bastions he built were named after him. In 1642 he commanded with Count Bruay the right wing of the Imperial army in the disastrous Battle of Breitenfeld. A year later, he commanded an Imperial army in Hungary.

Gonzaga also commanded troops that the Emperor had sent to Hungary in 1658. In 1660 he became General of Artillery, Field Marshal and Privy Council. He was a member of a delegation that negotiated the Treaty of Oliva in Berlin with Frederick William, Elector of Brandenburg. Since 1666 he was president of the Imperial War Council (Hofkriegsrat) and High Steward of the widowed Empress Eleonora (the wife of Ferdinand III). He was also a knight in the Order of the Golden Fleece.

He was buried in the Franciscan Church in Vienna. In 1861, a street in Vienna, the Gonzagagasse was named after him.

== Family ==
He married first in 1636 to Marie of Saxe Lauenburg, daughter of Francis II, Duke of Saxe-Lauenburg and Maria of Brunswick-Lüneburg. Following her death in 1644, he remarried in 1646 to Maria Barbara, Countess of Csáky, thereby establishing ties with the Hungarian nobility. Both marriages produced four sons and several daughters; however, all four sons predeceased their father.
