= Axel Lillie =

Swedish soldier and politician

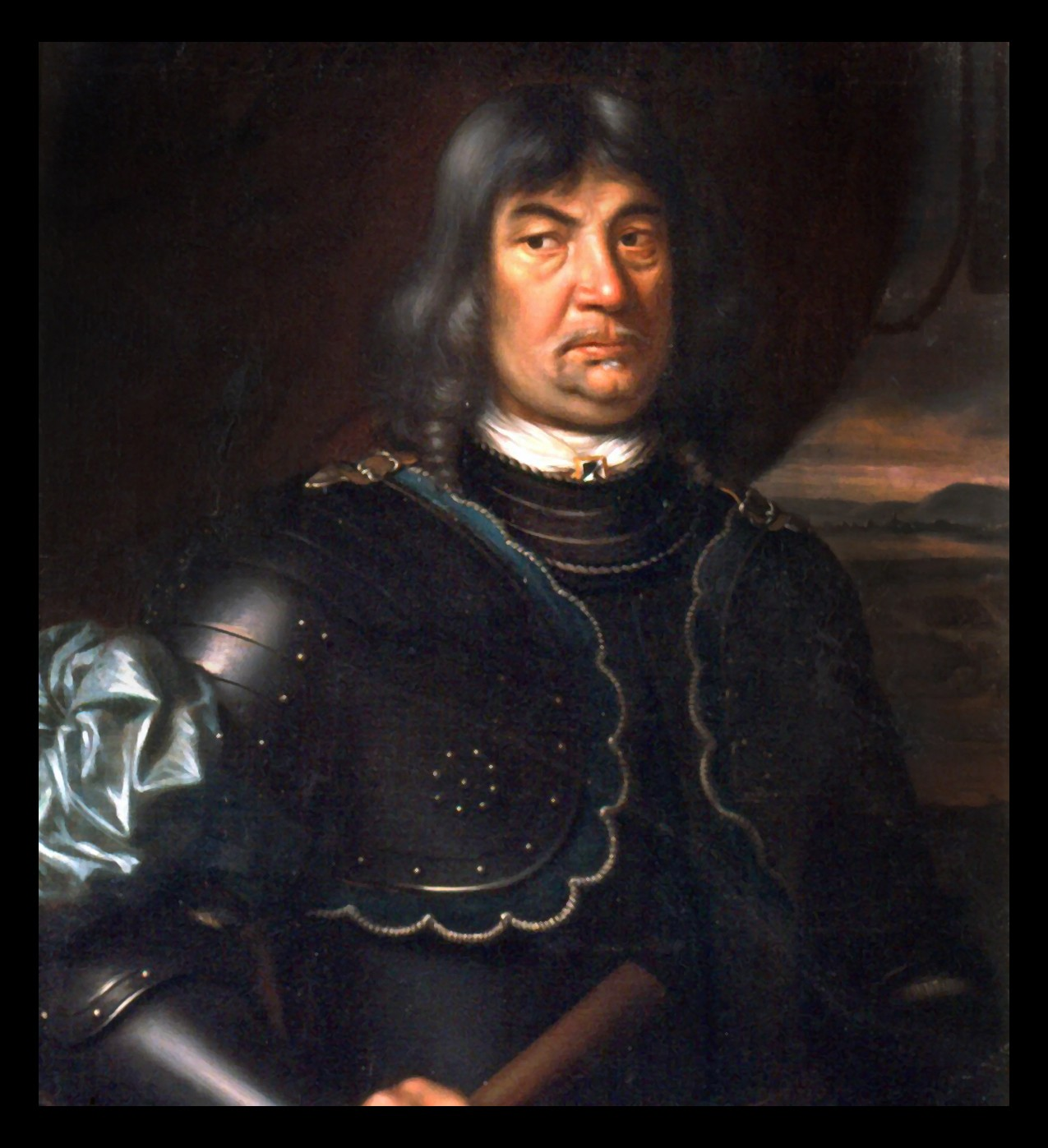
Axel Lillie

Count Axel Lillie, also spelled Lillje (23 July 1603 – 20 December 1662) was a Swedish soldier and politician. He was appointed Governor of all Pomerania in 1643, Privy Councilor in 1648, Governor General of Pomerania in 1652, Field Marshal in 1657, and Governor General of Livonia in 1661. In the Thirty Years' War (1618-1648), he commanded troops at the Battle of Leipzig, in 1642. He had Löfstad Castle built.
