= Vallen Castle =

Building in Laholm Municipality, Halland County, Sweden

Coordinates: 56°25′46″N 13°07′37″E

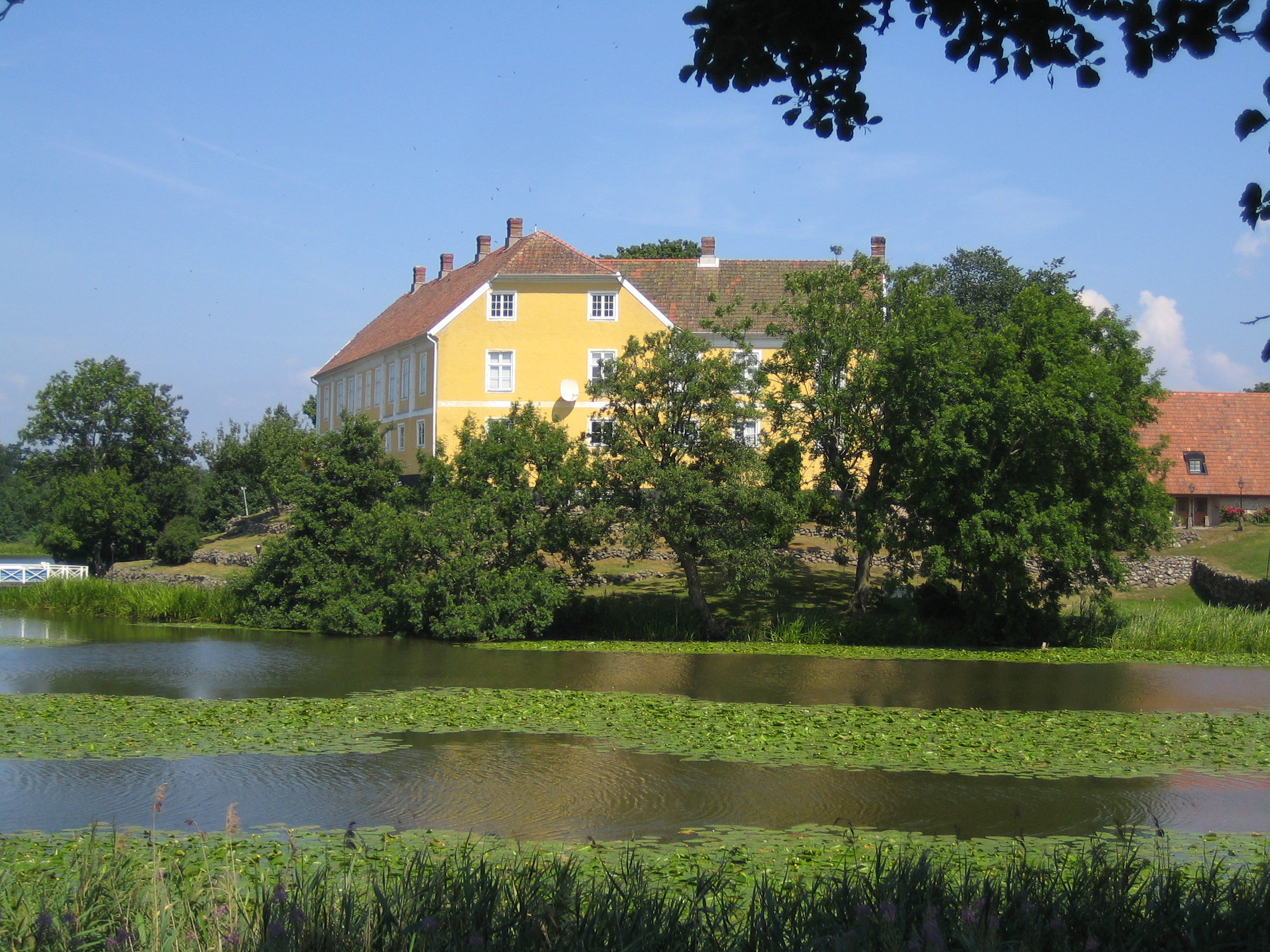
Vallen Castle

Vallen Castle is in Våxtorp in the county of Halland, Sweden. The estate was first settled in the 13th century by the knight Peder Laxmand. By 1400 the site was owned by brothers Åke and Povel Laxmand. The castle eventually built on the site was burned and looted multiple times during the wars between Sweden and Denmark.

In 1654 the estate's last Danish owner ceded the property to Sweden. That year, it was acquired by the Swedish county governor Magnus Durell. His spouse, Birgitta Durell, made the estate the base of a prosperous industry, in which the peasantry in the province of Halland knitted socks for her, which she sold to the Swedish army. This industry, based in Vallen Castle and sometimes known as the Laholm manufacture, was kept by the family for over a century.
