= Johan Conrad Ernst =

Danish architect and master builder (1666–1750)

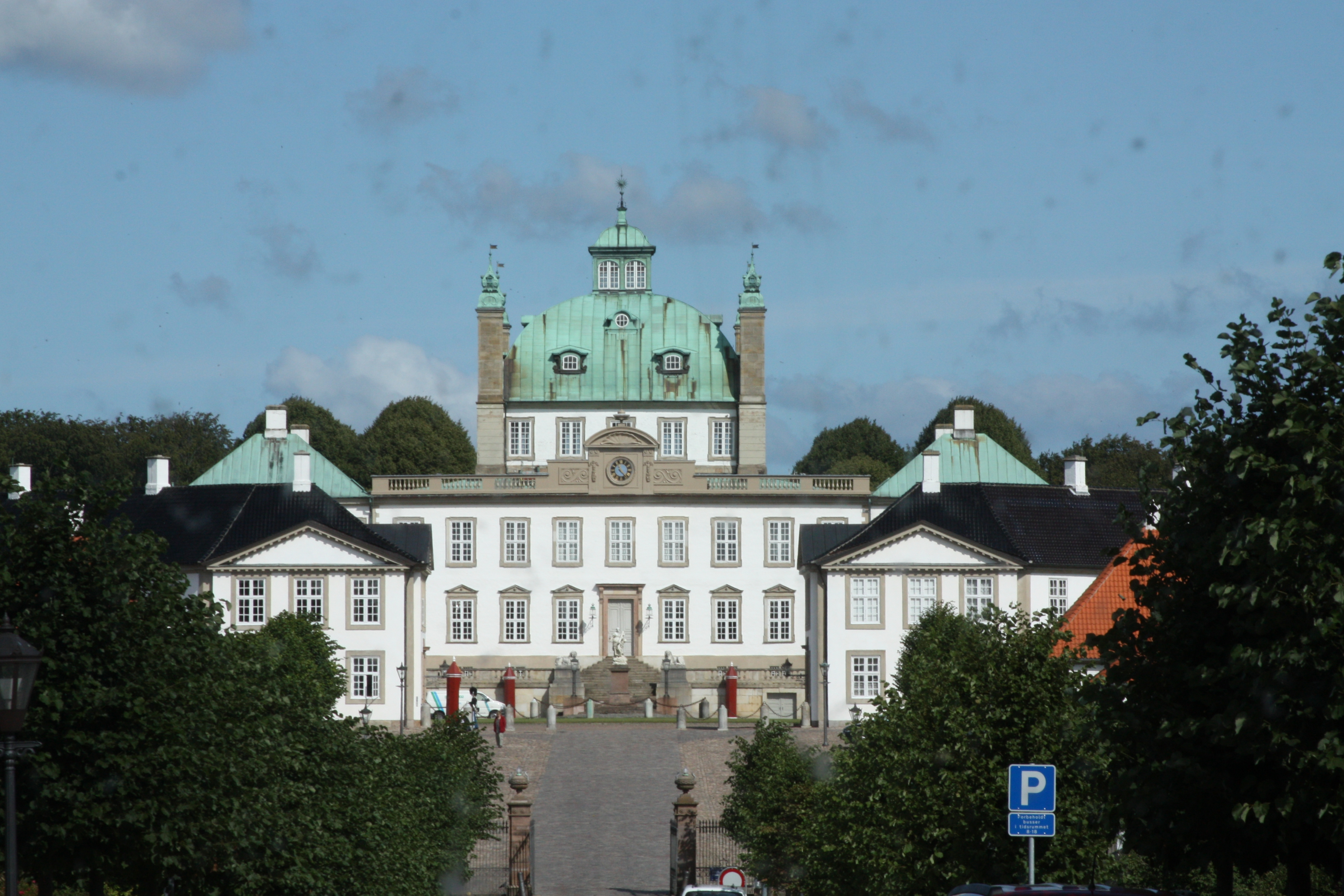
Ernst coordinated the construction of Fredensborg Palace

Johan Conrad Ernst (16 June 1666 – 23 September 1750) was a Danish architect and royal master builder.

== Early life and background ==
Ernst was the son of Johan Adolf Ernst, a successful linen merchant who had immigrated from Nuremberg and had a luxurious residence on Amagertorv in Copenhagen. His brother Johan Bertram Ernst served as chief of police in Copenhagen.

Little is known of his childhood or education but the Swedish architect Nicodemus Tessin the Younger commented that the young man was sophisticated, sociable and widely traveled.

== Career ==
At the age of 27, he already had the rank of royal master builder and became court assessor in 1703, counsellor to the chancery in 1709, counselor at law in 1716, and finally counselor of state in 1729.

In 1696, as royal master builder, he was sent to Stockholm to assist Tessin in completing a wooden model and plans for a new residential palace for Christian V. The King intended to have it built on the Amalienborg site but nothing came of the venture.

After the Great Fire in Bergen, Norway, on 19 May 1702, Ernst was among the architects drawn upon for the rebuilding of the city. He designed the Manufakturhuset and Hagerupgården, both completed in 1705. His early work also included Elers' Kollegium (1705) and a chapel in the Church of Holmen (1708). The following year, under instructions from the master builder general, Vilhelm Platens (1667–1732), Ernst became responsible for extending the recently built Frederiksberg Palace (1708–1709). On Platen's retirement, Ernst became his successor with an annual remuneration of 1,000 rigsdaler.

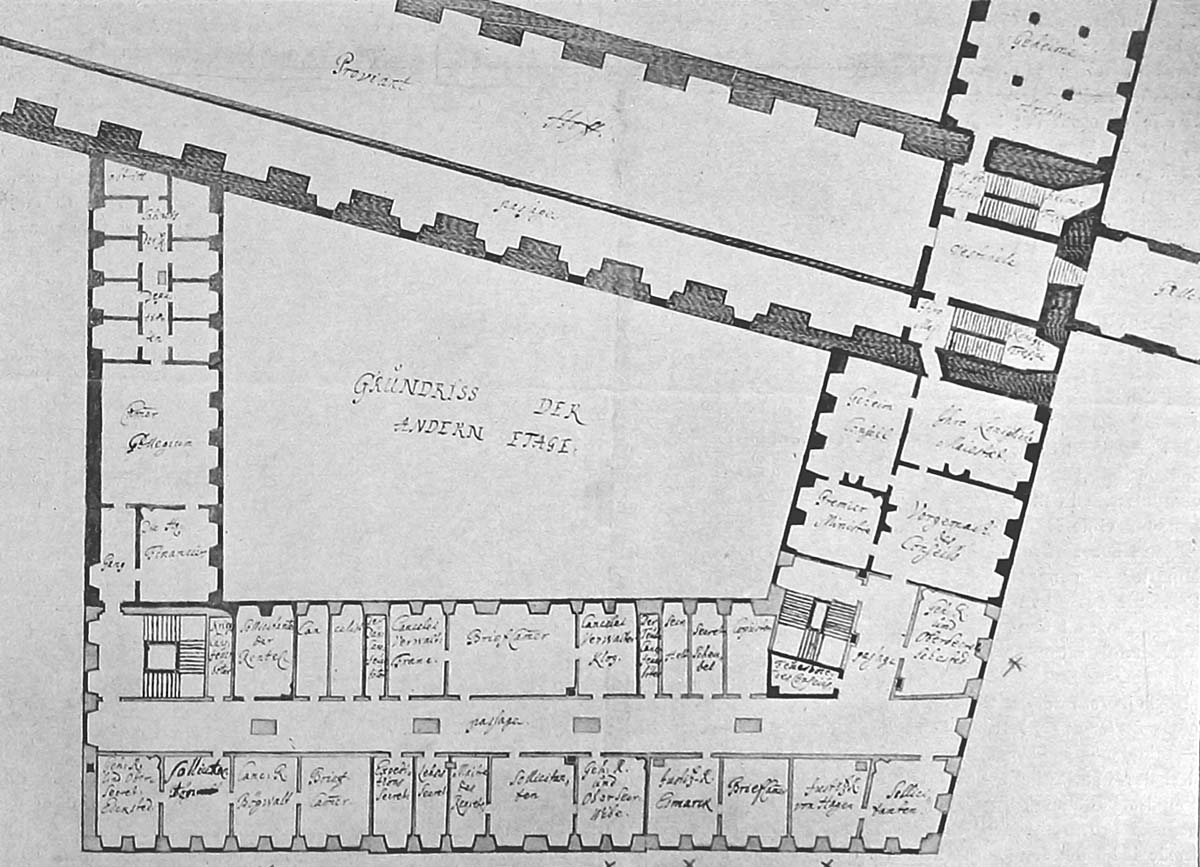
Ernst's plan for the Slotsholmen Chancery Building

He had also had assignments at Copenhagen Castle including the construction of the Boldhus (the king's indoor ball court).

From 1718 to 1721, he converted the opera house to a training school for cadets and, for a time, coordinated the construction of Fredensborg Palace. During the same period, he designed the Gehejmearkivbygningen (1721) which is now part of the National Archives.

In 1719, he constructed the Chancery Building on Slotsholmen. Together with J.C. Krieger, he designed the fourth Copenhagen City Hall which was completed in 1728 but burnt down in 1795.

From 1731, he spent a number of years coordinating the construction of Hirschholm Palace to the north of Copenhagen.

== Family and property ==
On 23 April 1703, Ernst married Magdalene Foss who died in 1718. Her father was rector of the Metropolitan School Peder Nielsen Foss (1631-1698). In 1719, he married Margrethe Elisabeth Weinmann, the widow of Anders Jacobsen Lindberg. Ernst was a highly respected, well-to-do gentleman. He owned the Aunsøgård estate near Kalundborg and maintained a luxurious home in Copenhagen's Stormgade. He died in 1750 and was buried at Viskinge churchyard in Kalundborg.

His daughter Frederica Louise Ernst settled as a planter on Saint Croix in the Danish West Indies.

== See also ==
- Architecture of Denmark
