= Birgitta Durell =

Dutch-born Swedish industrialist

Brechtgien "Birgitta" Durell, née von Crakow or von Cracauw (1619 in Hoorn, the Netherlands – 1683 in Sweden) was a Swedish (originally Dutch) industrialist.

She was the daughter of Carel van Cracauw, the Dutch envoy to Copenhagen, a rich heiress and related to rich bankers. In 1647, she married the rich Swedish merchant Magnus Durell, who had been ennobled not long before their wedding. She followed her spouse to Sweden and settled on his recently acquired country estate, Vallen Castle near Laholm.

The family of her spouse had, two years before her wedding, been given a contract from the crown to provide the Swedish army with knitted socks, which had not yet been fulfilled. The contract formally belonged to her spouse, but as he was often absent and busy with his position as country governor and president of Göta Court, Birgitta Durell was given the responsibility to organize and manage this business. Birgitta Durell was described as possessing initiative and thrift. She organized the entire enterprise around the Vallen Castle. She held lessons for her staff, and then had them in turn give lessons to the surrounding peasantry, in the art of knitting known as binge, which was therefore introduced by her. Next, she imported and bought wool, which was distributed to the peasantry of Halland, who were then employed to knit socks for the army on her commission.

The Vallen Castle or Laholm industry was hugely successful, and the contract with the crown belonged to the same family for decades: after the death of Birgitta Durell, it was managed by her daughter Magna Birgitta Durell (1653–1709), then by the widow of her grandson, Clara Sabina Lilliehöök (1686–1758), thereafter by her great granddaughter Magdalena Eleonora Meck (1717–1766), until the family lost the contract and it was taken over by Charlotta Richardy over a hundred years later.
