= Battle of Breitenfeld (1642) =

1642 battle of the Thirty Years' War

Coordinates: 51.3403°N 12.3748°E

Second Battle of Breitenfeld
- Part of the Thirty Years' War
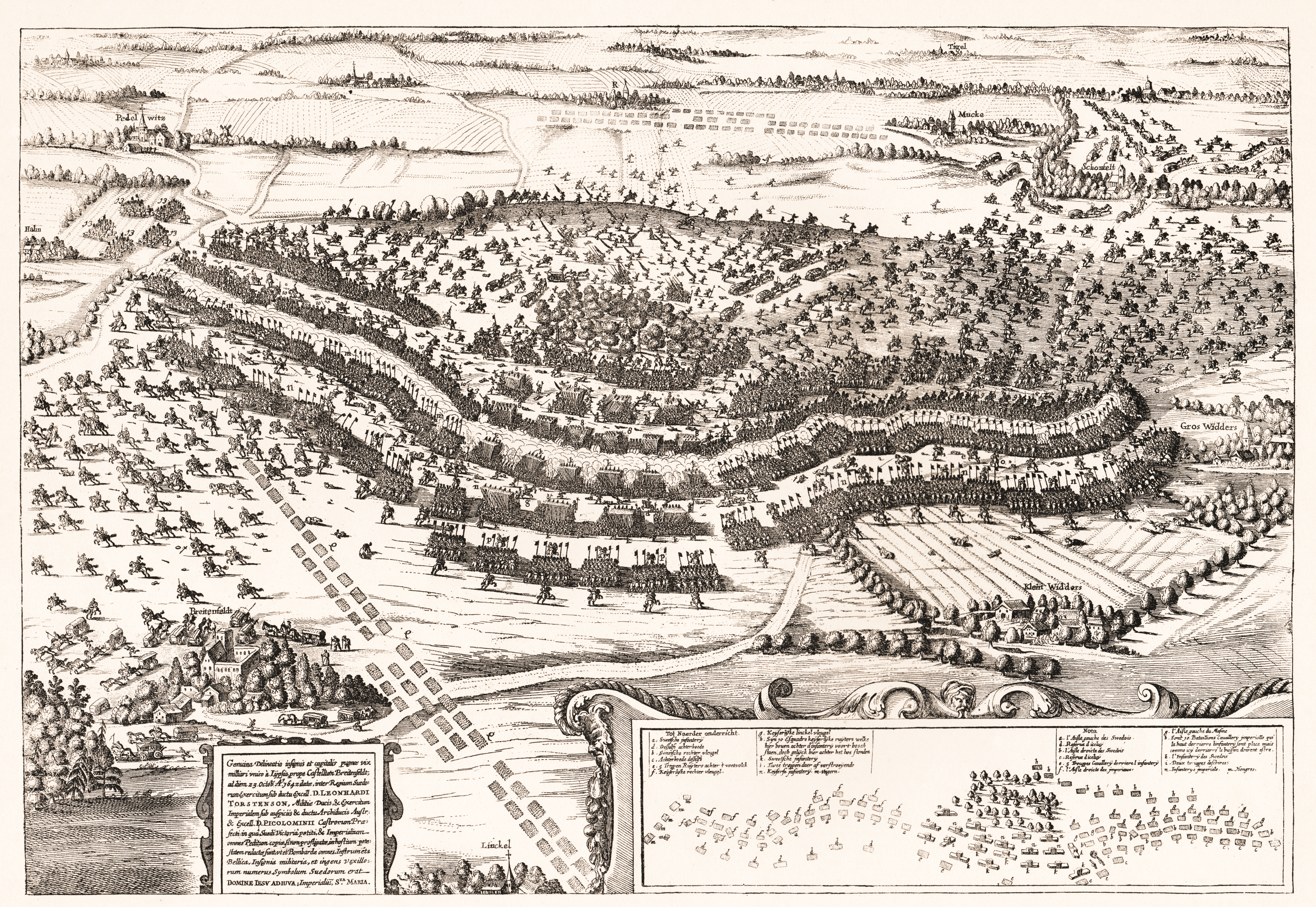
- Contemporary engraving depicting the battle
Date	2 November 1642 (N.S.)
Location	Breitenfeld, Saxony (present-day Germany)
Result	Swedish victory

Belligerents
(yes) Swedish Empire	Holy Roman Empire; Saxony

Commanders and leaders
(yes) Lennart Torstensson (yes) Arvid Wittenberg (yes) Erik Slang † (yes) Johan Lilliehöök † (Swedish Empire) Hans Christoff von Königsmarck	Archduke Leopold Wilhelm; Ottavio Piccolomini; Annibale Gonzaga; Hans Christoph von Puchheim; Ernst Roland von Suys (POW)

Strength
20,000 10,000 infantry 10,000 cavalry 70 guns	26,000 10,000 infantry 16,000 cavalry 46 guns

Casualties and losses
4,000 2,000 killed 2,000 wounded	7,500–10,000 3,000–5,000 dead or wounded 4,500–5,000 captured 46 guns

The Second Battle of Breitenfeld, also known as the First Battle of Leipzig, took place during the Thirty Years' War on 2 November 1642 at Breitenfeld, north-east of Leipzig in Germany. A Swedish Army commanded by Lennart Torstensson defeated an Imperial Army under Archduke Leopold Wilhelm of Austria and his deputy Ottavio Piccolomini.

Victory allowed the Swedes to occupy and establish a secure base in Leipzig, the second most important town in the Electorate of Saxony. Although significantly weakened by the defeat and forced onto the defensive, the Imperial Army prevented them from fully exploiting their victory and kept John George I, Elector of Saxony from making peace with Sweden.

== Prelude ==
During 1641, the Swedish army narrowly escaped the pursuit by Imperials and Bavarians after its failed attack on the Imperial Diet in Regensburg in January. Its commander Johan Banér lost several thousand men at the battles of Neunburg and Preßnitz until his untimely death at Halberstadt in May. With the help of their French and Guelph allies, the remnant of the Swedes repelled the Imperials at Wolfenbüttel but only the arrival of Lennart Torstensson in November with fresh recruits and the outstanding pay saved them from mutiny. The Emperor's peace with the Guelphs in the Treaty of Goslar removed the strategic link between the Swedes and the French army under Jean-Baptiste Budes de Guébriant, forcing the French to turn west where they defeated an Imperial army under Guillaume de Lamboy at Kempen in early 1642.

Because of Kempen, the Westphalian army under Melchior von Hatzfeld and the Bavarians under Franz von Mercy split up from the main Imperial force to contain Guébriant's advance. Imperials and Swedes moved to the east where the Swedes pitched winter quarters in Brandenburg, which had declared neutrality in 1641. Brandenburger denial of military access to the Imperials prevented them from assaulting the Swedes in February 1642. The Imperial commander Archduke Leopold Wilhelm was compelled to retreat from Genthin in the Bishopric of Magdeburg to move into winter quarters in late February. While the Imperials were still obtaining quarters in April, the Swedes already started their campaign.

The new Swedish commander Torstensson planned an offensive in 1642 to strike into the Habsburg lands. While a mobile force under Hans Christoff von Königsmarck raided westwards towards Quedlinburg as a distraction, Torstensson moved east to Lusatia from where he invaded Silesia. He took Głogów, one of its strongest fortresses, by storm on 4 May. The Imperial commander in Silesia, Franz Albrecht of Saxe-Lauenburg, collected a small army of 7,500 men and called Archduke Leopold Wilhelm of Austria for aid. Before being reinforced by a detachment from the main Imperial Army under Ottavio Piccolomini, Franz Albrecht tried to relieve the siege of Schweidnitz. Tricked into attacking a much larger Swedish force on 31 May, his troops were overwhelmed and he was mortally wounded.

Piccolomini withdrew to Brno to join with the Archduke, while on 14 June Torstensson captured Olomouc in Moravia after a short siege. After collecting superior forces, the Imperials forced the outnumbered Swedes back into Silesia, pursued by the Archduke. Leaving a blockading corps at Olomouc, on 25 July his vanguard under Raimondo Montecuccoli defeated a Swedish detachment at Troppau which was screening the siege of Brieg, forcing Torstensson to abandon it and retreat across the Oder river. The Archduke laid siege to Głogów on 10 August but abandoned it on 12 September when Torstensson offered him battle in front of the fortress. The Swedish army was now large enough to put the Imperials under pressure and they pulled back to the Bohemian border where they entrenched themselves and used their light cavalry to harass the Swedish supply lines. Withdrawing into Saxony in October, Torstensson laid siege to Leipzig, the second-largest city in Saxony and an important stronghold for John George I, Elector of Saxony, an Imperial ally.

== Battle ==
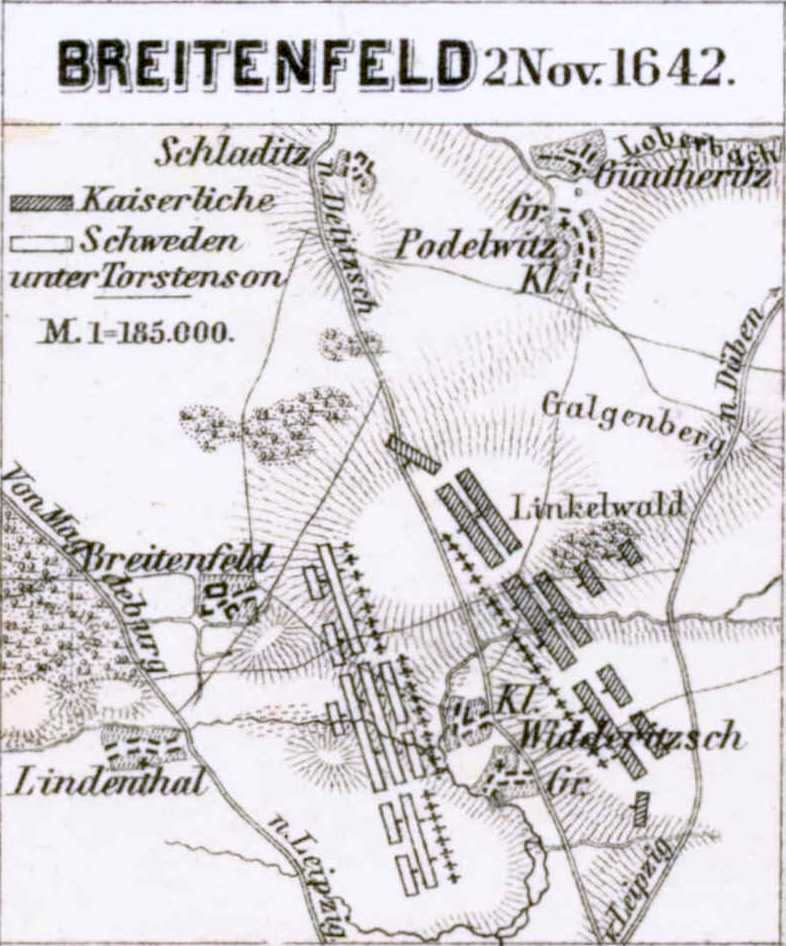
Map of the battle.

The fast approach of the Imperial Army under the Archduke and Piccolomini forced Torstensson to lift the siege of Leipzig on 1 November. Assuming the Swedes were in disorderly retreat, the Archduke and his war council decided to attack against the advice of Piccolomini who considered them too strong for a direct assault. The Swedes retreated to better positions outside Breitenfeld where they awaited attack.

The Imperials had 26,000 men and 46 guns against 20,000 and 70 respectively for the Swedes. Despite the disparity in numbers, the two forces were roughly equivalent because the Imperial army included many irregular Croatian and Hungarian cavalry of questionable combat value, as well as some dragoons and old-fashioned arquebusier regiments. The Swedish cavalry was almost exclusively heavy cuirassiers. Both sides placed their cavalry on the wings, with the infantry in the centre, split into two subgroups because a small forest, the Linkelwald, bisected the Imperial lines.

Battle began in the early morning of 2 November with an artillery duel in which Swedish artillery commander Johan Lilliehöök was mortally wounded. The Swedes crossed the Rietzschke river and their right wing under Arvid Wittenberg attacked the Imperial left. Its commander Hans Christoph von Puchheim had not yet fully deployed his troops and some of his regiments took flight, allegedly led by Madlo's regiment of arquebusiers in the front line, followed by a number of neighbouring units and most of the Saxon regiments holding the second line. The remainder were rallied by Colonel Nicola who repulsed two Swedish attacks with the support of the reserve cavalry under Ernst Roland von Suys before a third assault broke through, killing Nicola and several other officers.

On the other side of the battlefield, the result was the opposite. The Imperial right under Annibale Gonzaga and Count Bruay shattered most of the Swedish left under Erik Slang and pushed them back onto their reserve under Königsmarck which continued to resist. Torstensson decided to split his victorious right; one part under Torsten Stålhandske pursued the fleeing Imperial left, while the rest under Wittenberg moved behind the Imperial centre to attack their right from behind. Under pressure from two sides, this broke while Piccolomini and the Archduke used their personal bodyguards along with the Alt- and Neu-Piccolomini, Mislik, Borneval and Luttke regiments as a rear guard to cover their retreat. Although the infantry north of the Linkelwald escaped, the group to the south was encircled by the Swedish cavalry and forced to surrender.

The Imperial Army lost all 46 guns along with 3,000 to 5,000 dead or wounded plus another 4,500 or 5,000 taken prisoner, including generals Suys and Fernemont. Swedish casualties were 4,000 dead or wounded, Generals Lilliehöök and Slang were killed, while General Stålhandske, commander of the Finnish Hakkapeliitta cavalry, was seriously wounded.

== Aftermath ==
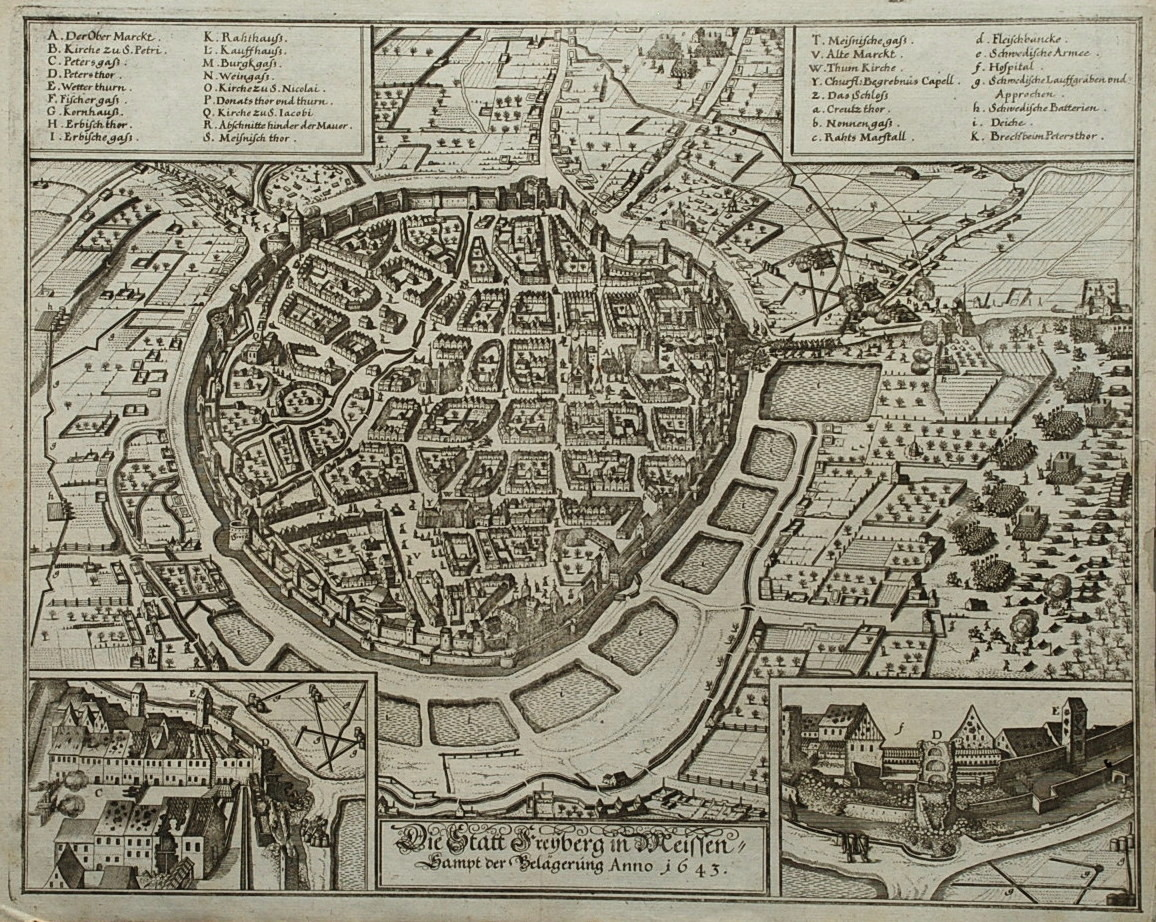
The Swedes failed to take Freiberg in early 1643

Rather than begin another offensive, Torstensson renewed the siege of Leipzig that held out until 7 December. Its loss gave the Swedes a secure base in Saxony and was a serious blow to Elector John George, although most of the Imperial prisoners who joined the Swedish army after Breitenfeld deserted during the siege. Axel Lillie was appointed commander of Leipzig and enforced a large contribution of 150,000 talers. On 29 December, Wittenberg captured Chemnitz while Torstensson conferred with the French commander Guébriant. In early January, the Swedes besieged Freiberg, whose Saxon garrison resisted stubbornly and repelled an attack on 13 January. Having rebuilt the Imperial Army in Bohemia, Piccolomini arrived outside Freiberg on 27 February, forcing the Swedes to abandon the siege, an action that may have stopped John George from leaving the war.

Archduke Leopold Wilhelm assembled a court-martial in Prague which sentenced the Madlo regiment to exemplary punishment at Rokycany. Six regiments, which had distinguished themselves in the battle, were assembled fully armed and surrounded Madlo's regiment, which was severely rebuked for its cowardice and misconduct and ordered to lay down its arms, after which their regimental colours were torn in pieces. In a process known as decimation, lots were drawn and every 10th soldier of the regiment and 5 officers were executed next day.

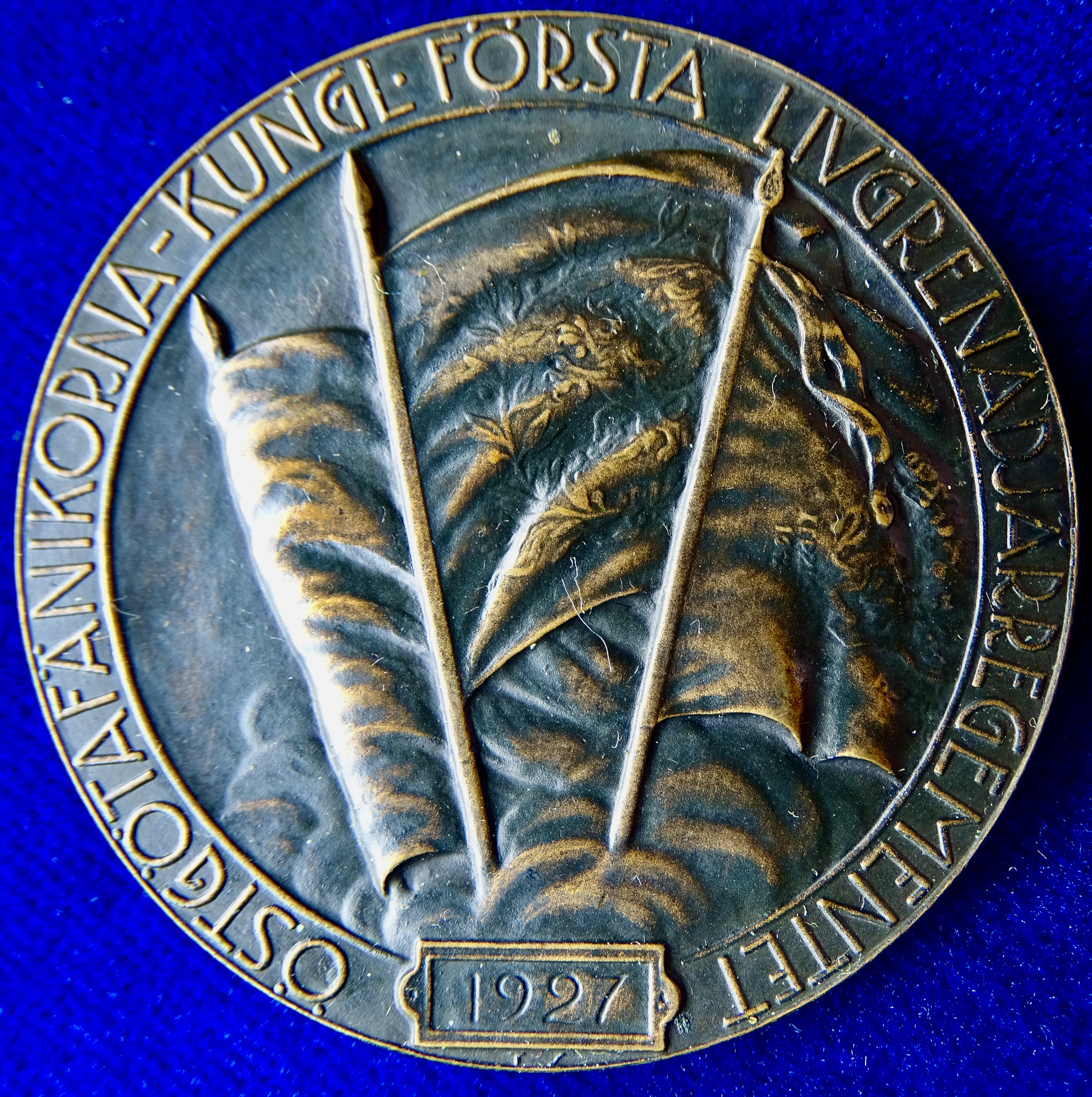
First Battle of Leipzig 1642 on the flag of a Swedish 1927 Art Deco Medal, obverse

Defeat ignited antagonism in the army between Germans and Italians, commonly called "Welsche" or "Walsche", who claimed it was due to the collapse of the mostly German left wing under Puchheim, who in turn argued the mostly Italian right under Gonzaga had failed to support them. The court-martial of Madlo's regiment seemed to confirm the guilt of the left wing but did not calm tempers. When the Archduke asked Hatzfeld, who had arrived with reinforcements in January 1643, to take over command while he travelled to Vienna, Hatzfeld refused saying he could not repair the mistakes of the Italians. Confronted with this insubordination, the Archduke resigned his command and in February was temporarily replaced by Piccolomini before he decided to enter Spanish service and stepped down in April. The returning Trentine general Matthias Gallas took over command, largely because he was acceptable to both Germans and Italians. Most of the Italian generals like the Gonzagas or Montecuccoli chose to retire or depart for Italy to fight in the First War of Castro. Only Bruay was persuaded by the Emperor to stay instead of following Piccolomini.

In April, the Swedes started their next offensive. Gallas anticipated their aim of supplying Olomouc and tried to block their way with a strong defensive position at Hradec Králové and by refusing them any crossing of the Elbe. Torstensson avoided Gallas' main force and feinted an attack at Brandýs nad Labem to distract the Imperials. He attained a crossing at Mělník, moved forward and reached northern Moravia prior to Gallas where he supplied the Swedish garrisons. Gallas and the Imperials followed him over Brno and again took a defensive position in front of the Swedes. The Imperials used their superior light cavalry to harass the Swedes in skirmishes. The Swedes held out until October when they retreated into Silesia and then left Habsburg territory to attack Denmark in the Torstenson War.

== Commemoration ==
The dissolution of the Swedish Royal First Life Grenadier Regiment in 1927 was commemorated by this medal showing on the obverse the Second Battle of Breitenfeld as "Leipzig 1642".
