= 1739 in Sweden =

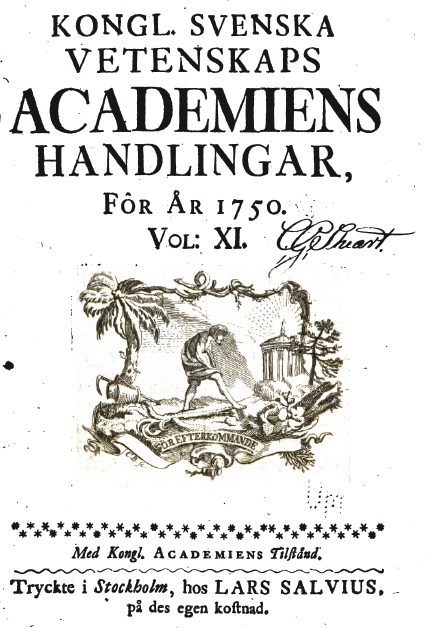

Events from the year 1739 in Sweden

== Incumbents ==
- Monarch – Frederick I

== Events ==
- 16 April – The Hats (party) forms government with Carl Gyllenborg as Privy Council Chancellery.
- 2 June - Royal Swedish Academy of Sciences is founded.
- Sweden form an alliance with the Ottoman Empire against the Empire of Russia.
- Foundation of the Vadstena adliga jungfrustift.
- A reform partially retracts the unpopular sumptuary law of servants clothing from 1720, and secures the rights for servants of certain functions to dress as they wish, as the previous clothing restriction has proven to have a deteriorating effect on staff recruitment.
- The preference of Widow Conservation for the candidates of parish vicars is dropped: informally, however, the custom continue for decades yet.
- Sinclairvisan by Anders Odel
- The Manufakturkontoret (Office of Manufacture) is founded by the Riksdag of the Estates, which is to regulate and supervise the manufacture industry in Sweden.
- The new privileges of the manufacturing industry liberates industrial workers from military service.
- The country is partitioned in to districts, Schäferier.
- Spinning schools are founded in Stockholm to provide the growing linen textile industry with educated weavers.
- A new law states that all citizens should preferably dress in textiles manufactured within the country. To benefit the textile industry, the textile factories in Stockholm are tasked to educate spinning mistresses, female teachers in spinning, who are then financed by the government to establish spinning schools in each of the cities and country parishes of the country. This quickly results in a flourishing textile industry, but rather than to establish spinning factories, which had been the original idea of the government, most workers prefer to spin at home, and the spinning houses are instead made to labor work prisons for women.
- In accordance with the new law of spinning teachers, the linen weaver Elisabeth Forsell are sent to Finland on government support to introduce linen spinning in the province.
- The Uppsala University creates a professorship of economic law, the first in Europe.
- A new law is introduced regarding the employ of servants, which states that a family of the peasantry is allowed to have only one adult son and daughter residing at home in parallel: the rest of the adult children of a farmer are bound by law to find employment.
- A new regulation states that knowledge in the Finnish language should always be considered when someone is employed in a public office in the province of Finland; though all education above basic education and all public servants in Finland remain Swedish speaking, this regulation does increase the use of the Finnish language in public in Finland.

== Births ==
- 1 January - Sola i Karlstad, pub owner and local profile (died 1818)
- 23 February - Peter Adolf Hall, painter (died 1794)
- 8 March - Elias Martin, painter (died 1818)
- 30 November - Göran Rothman, naturalist, physician and an apostle of Carl Linnaeus (died 1778)

== Deaths ==
- 17 June - Malcolm Sinclair (Swedish nobleman), officer and envoy (born 1690)
- 18 June - Charles Frederick, Prince of Sweden and Duke of Schleswig-Holstein-Gottorp (born 1700).
