= 1690 in Sweden =

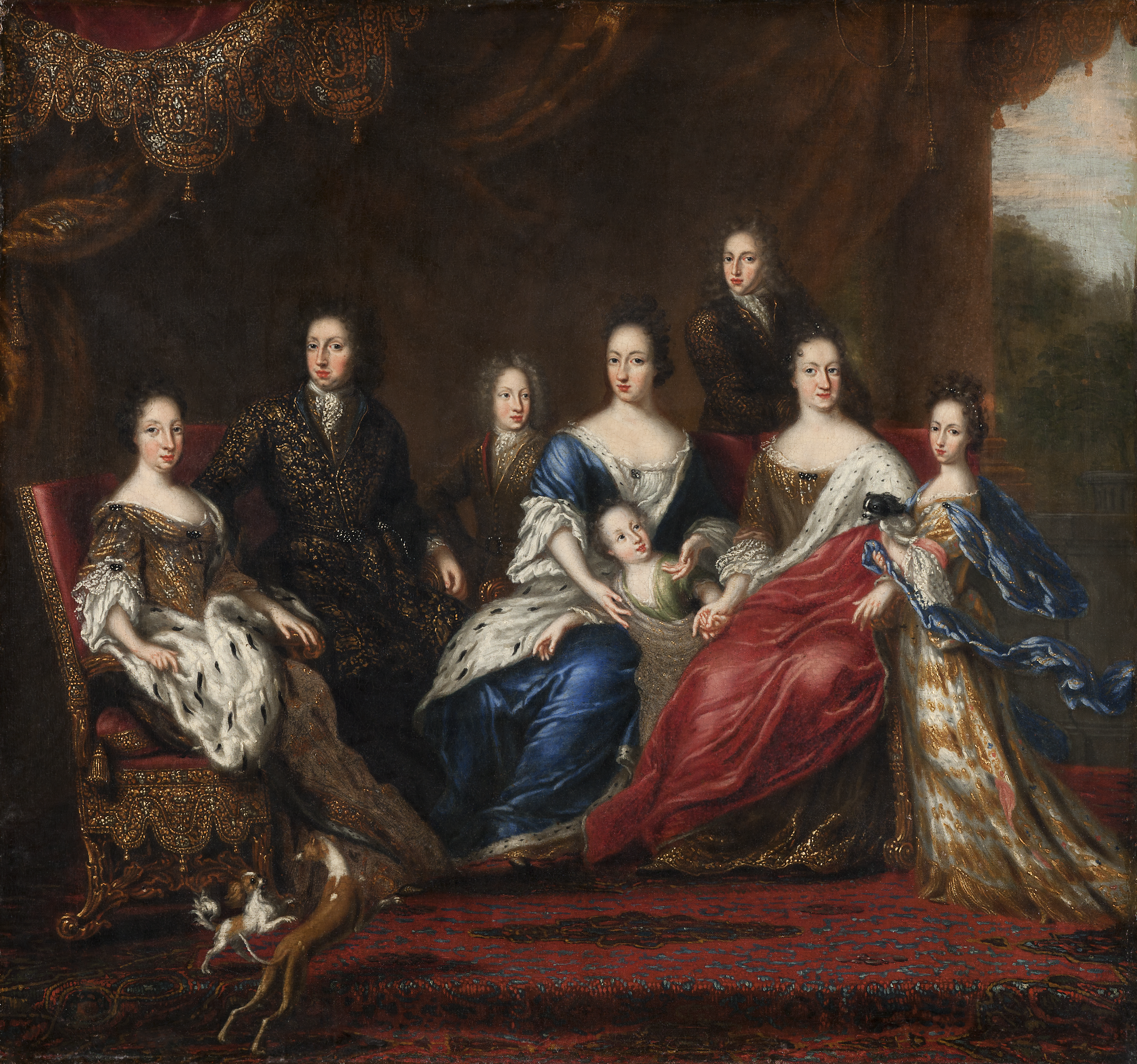
Family portrait of Karl XI

Events from the year 1690 in Sweden.

== Incumbents ==
- Monarch – Charles XI

== Births ==
- - Malcolm Sinclair (Swedish nobleman), officer, nobleman and envoy (died 1739)
- 9 April - Johan Henrik Scheffel, artist (died 1781)
- - Katarina Asplund, pietist (died 1758)

== Deaths ==
- - Gustaf Düben, organist and composer (born 1628)
- - Johannes Gezelius the elder, bishop (born 1615)
