= 1642 in Sweden =

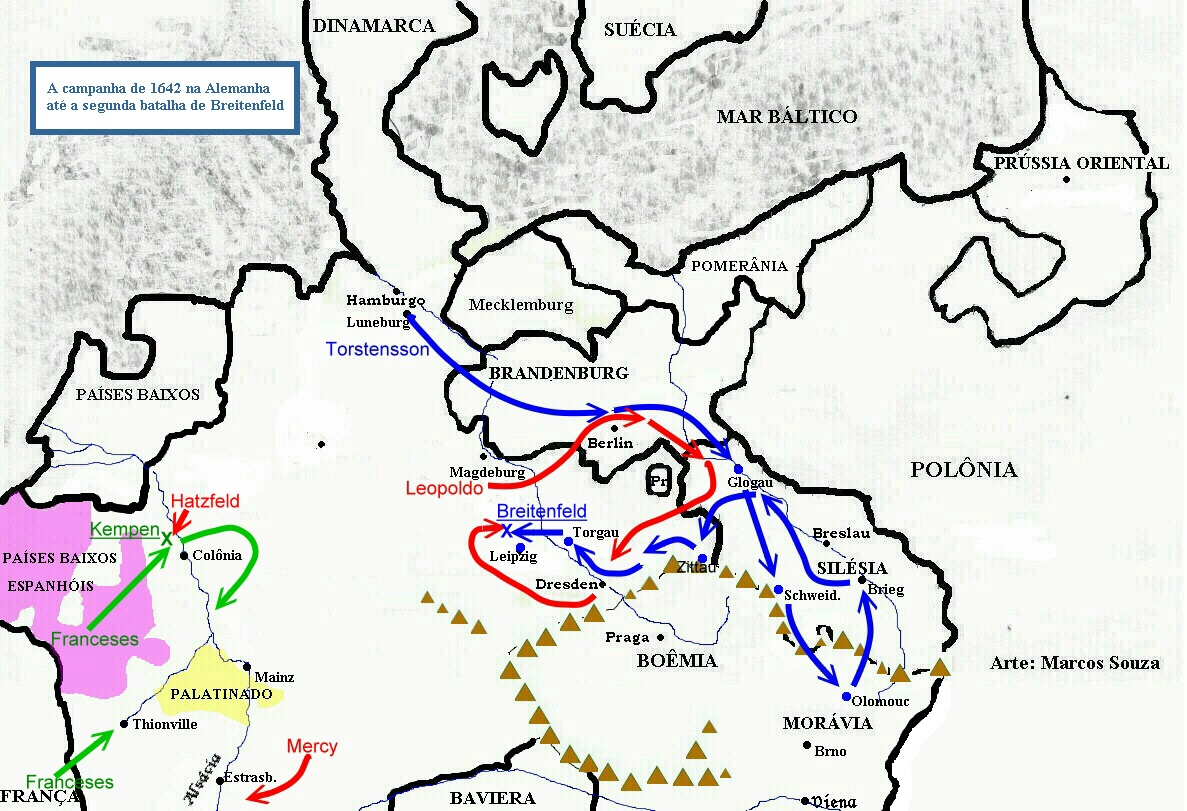

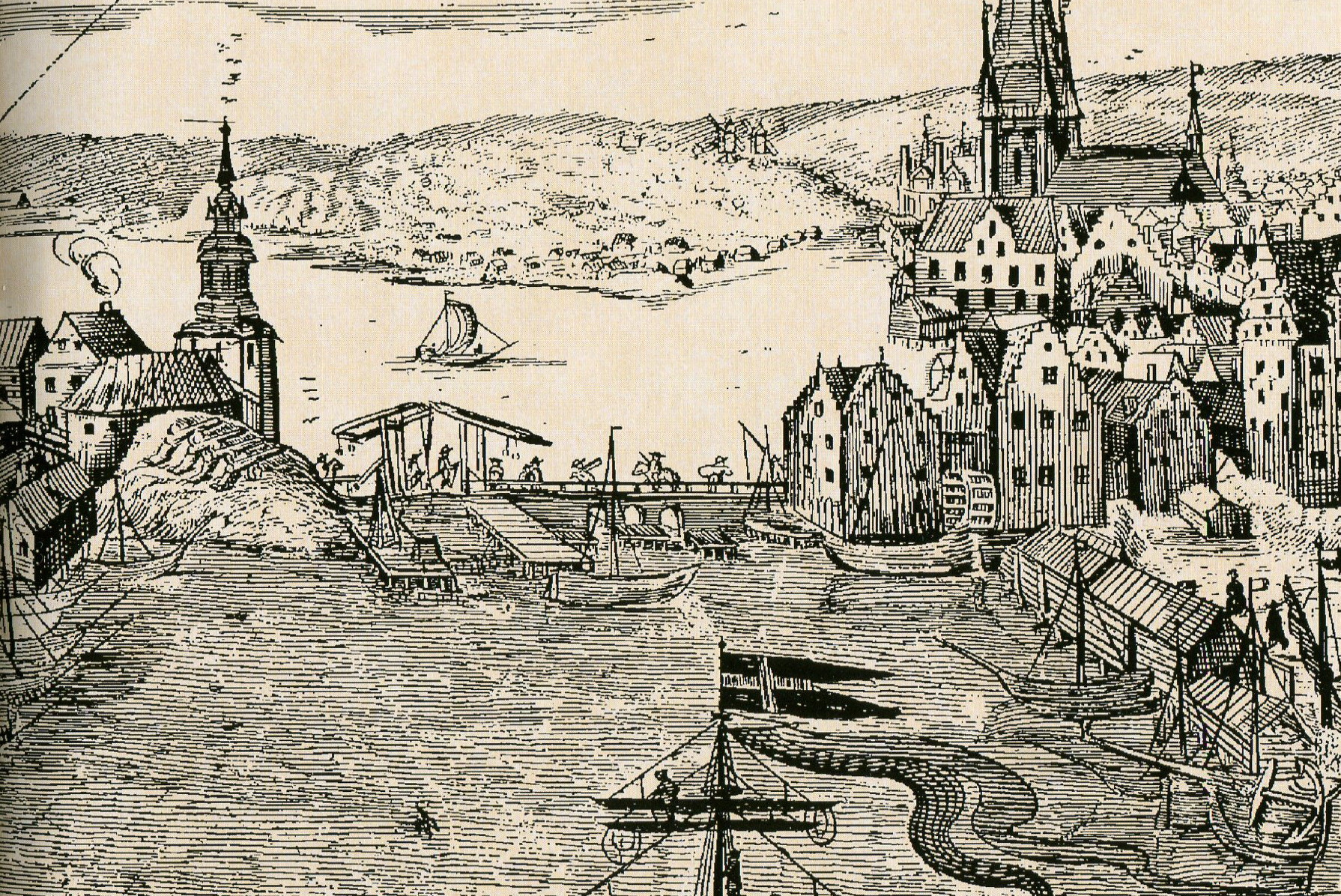
Slussen 1642

Events from the year 1642 in Sweden

== Incumbents ==
- Monarch – Christina

== Events ==
- As part of the Thirty Years' War, Lennart Torstensson, Count of Ortala, led the Swedish army in capturing Olomouc, in the Czech Republic, in June 1642. They destroyed many monuments, including the Hradisko Monastery, and rebuilt the city into a military fortress. Olomouc became the most important stronghold of Sweden during the Habsburg Monarchy.
- Battle of Schweidnitz.
- 23 October - Battle of Breitenfeld (1642), the Second Battle of Breitenfeld, also known as the First Battle of Leipzig, was a decisive victory for the Swedish army under the command of Field Marshal Lennart Torstenson over an Imperial Army under the command of Archduke Leopold Wilhelm of Austria and his deputy Ottavio Piccolomini, Duke of Amalfi.
- Though the Dutch protested Swedish claims to the land on the Delaware river, they collaborated in early 1642 on evicting a group of sixty English citizens who had come to establish England's claim to the region.
- New Sweden became the sole property of the Swedish government, who appointed Johan Printz as the colony's Governor. Printz set sail for New Sweden from Gothenburg the same year.
- The Beggar regulation of 1642 regulates the Swedish poor relief until the Poor Care Law of 1847.
- The village Bro, in Sweden, gains city rights for the second time.
- Early witch trials occurred in Njurunda, Sweden. Two sisters, Elin and Sigrid, were suspected of witchcraft, and then prosecuted.

== Births ==
- 5 November - Nils Gyldenstolpe (1642–1709), count, official and diplomat (died 1709)
- Anna Agriconia Åkerhielm, writer and traveller (died 1698)
- Nils Glydenstolpe, a prominent Swedish count.

== Deaths ==
- Simon de la Vallée, French-Swedish architect (died 1590)
- Ebba Ryning, court official (born 1595)
- Christina Natt och Dag, court official (born 1580)
