= 8th Bohemian Dragoons (Count Montecuccoli's) =

Named after regimental colonel, later 8th Regiment of Dragoons
- German: Dragoner-Regiment Nr.8
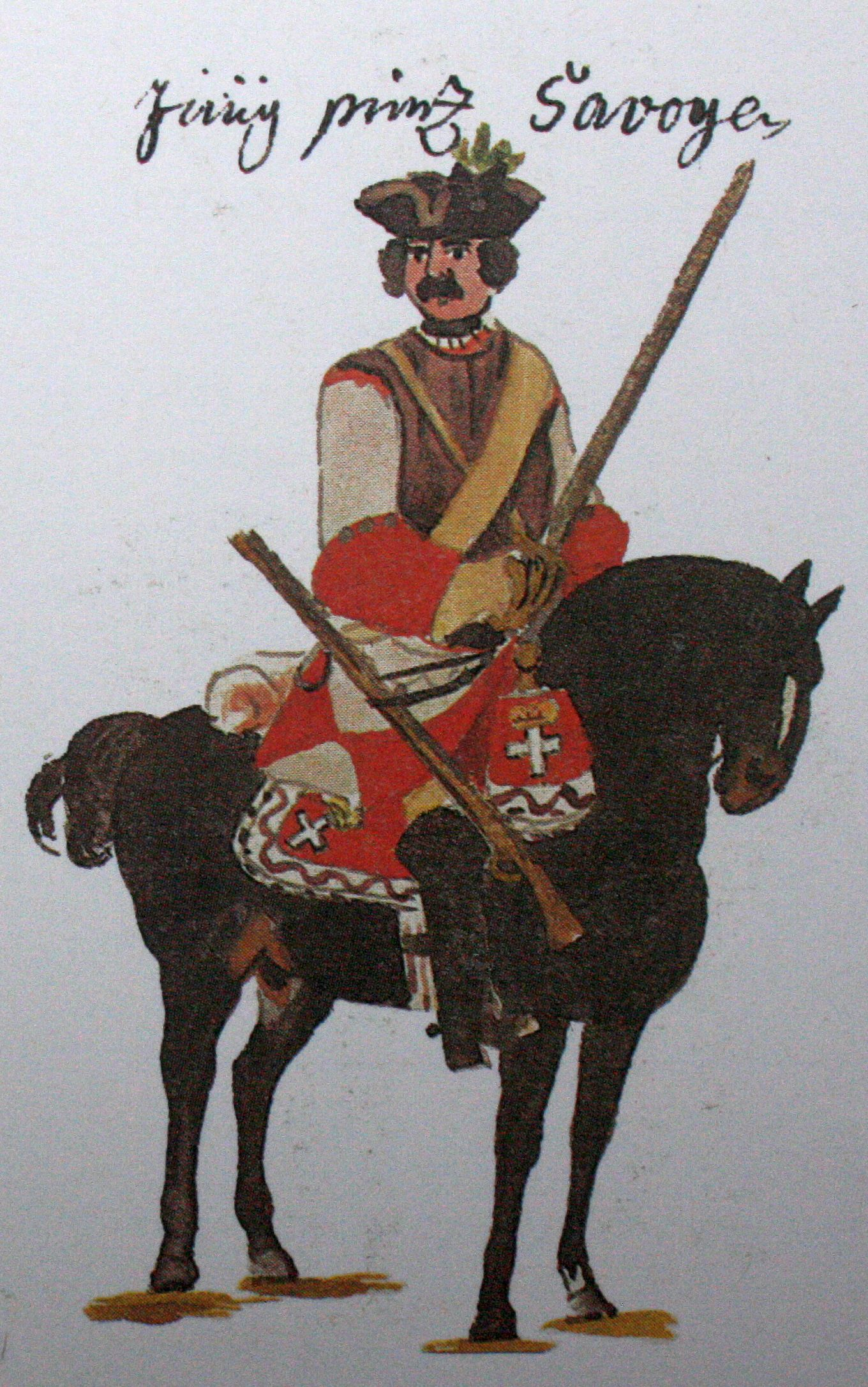
- Illustration of a regimental trooper in 1734
- Active: 1619 or 1683 to 1918
- Country: Habsburg States
- Type: cavalry
- Garrison/HQ: see article
- Engagements: Austrian War of Succession; Seven Years' War; Napoleonic Wars

Insignia
- First designation: Tessin: 1683/1
- Second designation: Bleckwenn: Kaiser Regiment K 2
- Third designation: 1769: 4th Cavalry Regiment
- Fourth designation: 1798: 6th Cuirassier Regiment
- Final designation: 1888: 8th Bohemian Dragoons (Count Montecuccoli's)

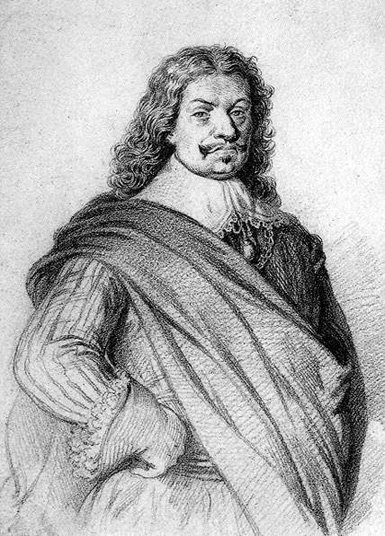
Historic portrait of the founder Raimondo Montecuccoli

The regiment was a cavalry unit raised in the 17th century for the Imperial Habsburg Army. Over time, this unit became the 8th Bohemian Dragoons (Count Montecuccoli's) (Böhmischen Dragoner-Regiment „Graf Montecuccoli“ Nr. 8) within the "Common Army" that formed part of the Austro-Hungarian Army. From 1888 the unit was to bear this new title "in perpetuity".

In 1769 the regiment was placed in the order of precedence as the 4th Cavalry Regiment (Cavallerie-Regiment Nr. 4) and in 1798 it became the 6th Cuirassier Regiment (Cürassier-Regiment Nr. 6).

By way of classification the unit was also subsequently given the following numbers: 1683/1 (by Tessin), Kürassierregiment K 2 (by Bleckwenn).

Until 1798 the regiment was named after its various Inhabers or colonels of the regiment, who were not necessarily its commanders. There was no authoritative naming system (e.g. Regiment Graf Serbelloni or Regiment Serbelloni). Regiments changed their names with each change of colonel. After 1798, the number of the unit took precedence, but could in certain circumstances be combined with the name of the regimental colonel. Because of this constant renaming of units, the regimental histories of Austro-Hungarian cavalry are very difficult to trace. In addition, there was a constant, and apparently arbitrary, sometimes repeated, redesignation of units (e.g. the 14th Regiment of Bohemian Dragoons (Prince of Windisch-Grätz, Böhmisches Dragoner-Regiment „Fürst zu Windisch-Graetz“ Nr. 14).

== History ==
The 8th Bohemian Dragoons is the oldest, regular regiment of horse in the Imperial-Royal, later Imperial and Royal (k. k. and k.u.k.), Cavalry. According to the traditional decree (Traditionserlass) of the 19th century, it existed for a total of 299 years. Other historic records consider the regiment's history to begin with its reformation in 1683 because the unit had been first disbanded in 1679.

In 1619, the Lower Austrian Protestant estates tried to obtain concessions from Emperor Ferdinand II at Hofburg Palace through the so-called storm petition (Sturmpetition). On that occasion, three squadrons (Fähnlein) of Dampierre's Regiment of Arquebusiers stationed in Krems and a squadron of "Dampierre's Regiment of Cuirassiers" under the commander of the arsenal, Colonel Gilbert of St. Hilaire, deployed to Vienna. Embarked on boats (so-called Tschaiken) on the River Danube, they arrived on 5 June 1619 at Vienna, entered the Residenz through the Fishermen's Gate (Fischertor) and intimidated the Protestants into abandoning their undertaking.

For this action, Emperor Ferdinand II bestowed on the regiment the following privileges, which were confirmed by Emperor Francis I during the secular celebrations of 1810:

The regiment may march when on duty to the sound of trumpets and with standards flying through the Imperial and Royal Hofburg Palace and the Imperial capital and Residenz city of Vienna, and may also set up on the imperial palace forecourt (the Franzensplatze) and recruit there for three days. The guard is then to be drawn from the regiment in front of the apartment granted pro forma to the regimental commander in the Hofburg Palace, to where the regimental standards are to be brought, and the respective regimental commander is permitted on such an occasion to appear, unannounced, in full dress before His Majesty the Emperor.

The regiment also has the assurance that it will never be disbanded or reduced, as long as it continues to maintain its current glory, and finally the distinction that no man of the regiment, for a crime punishable by death, shall be executed for the same, but in such cases, the culprit will be transferred to another regiment where such penalty may be carried out at any time.

In 1619, under the Imperial Commission of 16 March, 500 men were recruited by Grand Duke Cosmos II of Medici at his own expense (300 men as arquebusiers in the Netherlands and 200 men as cuirassiers in the imperial dominions). In 1621, this regiment was in imperial service under the name of the "Florentine Horse" (Florentinische Reiter). Generalfeldwachtmeister Henri de Dampierre, who had already been the proprietary colonel (Inhaber) and commander of a musketeer regiment since 1616, was appointed colonel of this new regiment.

- In 1683, five companies of Mercy's Regiment (Regiments Mercy) were handed over to form the cadre for training a new regiment for Colonel (Obrist) Dupigny. The unit was expanded to 10 companies through recruitment and continued the tradition of Bournenville's Regiment (Regiments Bournenville) and the old Dampierre's Cavalry
- In 1721, the Regiment took over a company of the disbanded Battée's Dragoons (Dragoner-Regiments Battée)
- In 1731, elements of the Auction companies, formed in 1727, were transferred to Pignatelli's and Kokorowa's Regiments (Regimenter Pignatelli und Kokorowa) (both disbanded in 1734)
- In 1768, the carabinier company was transferred to the recently formed 1st Regiment of Carabiniers (later 3rd Dragoons) and a squadron of the disbanded Modena's Cuirassiers (Kürassier-Regiment Modena) joined the Regiment
- In 1769 the Regiment was ranked as the 4th Cavalry in the order of precedence.
- In 1775 the Colonel's Division, then the Lieutenant Colonel's 1st Squadron of the disbanded Jacquemin Cuirassiers was added
- In 1780 Graf Friedrich Anton zu Hohenzollern-Hechingen became the Proprietor (Inhaber) (Kürassier-Regiment Hohenzollern-Hechingen)
- In 1798 the name was changed to the 8th Regiment of Cuirassiers
- In 1802, it took over the Lieutenant Colonel's Division of the disbanded Czartoryski's 4th Regiment (Kürassier-Regiment Czartoryski)
- In 1867, it was given the new name of 8th Dragoons

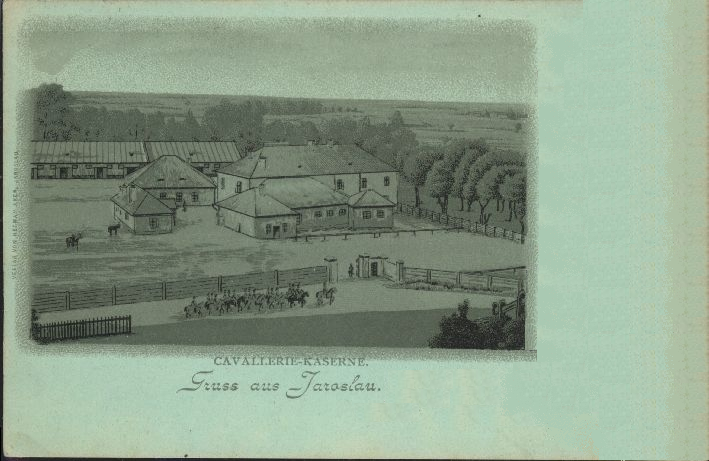
Cavalry barracks in Jaroslau

== Main and supplementary recruiting districts ==
- From 1781: Bohemia
- 1853 from the supplementary districts of 35th Regiment of Infantry (Plzeň)
- 1857–1860 from the districts of 14th, 28th and 42nd Regiments of Infantry (Neuhaus, Prague, Theresienstadt)
- 1860–1868 from the districts of 11th, 28th and 35th Regiments of Infantry (Písek, Prague, Plzeň)
- 1868–1877 from the districts of 28th and 75th Regiments of Infantry (Prague, Neuhaus)
- 1877–1883 from the districts of 28th and 42nd Regiments of Infantry (Prague, Theresienstadt)
- 1883–1889 from the districts of 42nd, 92nd and 94th Regiments of Infantry [Theresienstadt, Komotau, Turnau).
- 1889 it was allocated to the Military Territorial District of IX Corps (Josephstadt).
- 1914: supplementary district of Leitmeritz

== Peacetime garrisons ==
I.
- 1649 Linz
- 1650 Inner Austria
- 1651–1657 Styria
- 1660 Lower Austria
- 1661 Upper Hungary
- 1663–1664 Hungary, then Silesia
- 1665 Inner Austria
- 1670 Csakathurn
- 1671–1672 Upper Hungary
- 1679 Worms
- 1698–1701 Upper and Lower Austria (staff at Enns)
- 1714 Moravia and Silesia
- 1715–1716 Bohemia
- 1720 Nyitra County
- 1731 Upper Hungary (5 companies detached in the Milan area)
- 1733–1734 Bohemia (Pilsen Camp)
- 1736–1737 Banat
- 1739 Kaschau
- 1740–1741 Moravia
II.
- 1746–1747 Nyitra County
- 1748 Szered
- 1752–1756 Chrudim
- 1763 Hungarian Skalitz
- 1766 Szered
- 1767 Brezowa
- 1768 Szered
- 1770 Komitat Sohl and Komitat Trentschin
- 1775–1778 Hungarian Skalitz
- 1779 Güns
- 1787 Steinamanger, then Vienna
- 1788–1792 Saaz
- 1798–1799 Wittingau
- 1801 Grosswardein
- 1802–1805 alternating between Nagy-Károly and Szatmár
- 1806 Nagy-Károly
- 1807 Szikszó
- 1808–1809 Kittsee
- 1810 Báth (Frauenmarkt)
III.

- 1811 Vienna
- 1812–1813 Kyjov
- 1814–1815 Vienna
- 1815 Brandeis
- 1819 Vienna
- 1820 Klattau
- 1836–1848 Poděbrady
- 1849 Vienna
- 1851 Nagy Tapolcsán, then Neuhäusel
- 1852 Güns
- 1854 Mikulince, then Przeworsk
- 1855–1859 Prostějov
- 1859–1866 Czegléd
- 1866 Raab
- 1870 St. Georgen (Pressburg)
- 1879 Stockerau
- 1880 Vienna
- 1885 Pardubice
- 1903 Przemysl
- 1911–1914 Staff/1st Division/6 Sqn. Jaroslau - HQ 2nd Div/4 Sqn./5 Sqn. Radymno

== Colonels of the Regiment ==
- 1619 Colonel (Obrist) Heinrich Duval, Count Dampiere, Colonel General (Obristwachtmeister) over all mounted soldiers (Dampierre's Arquebusier Regiment)
- 1620 Jacob, Count of Dampierre, Lord of Mondroville

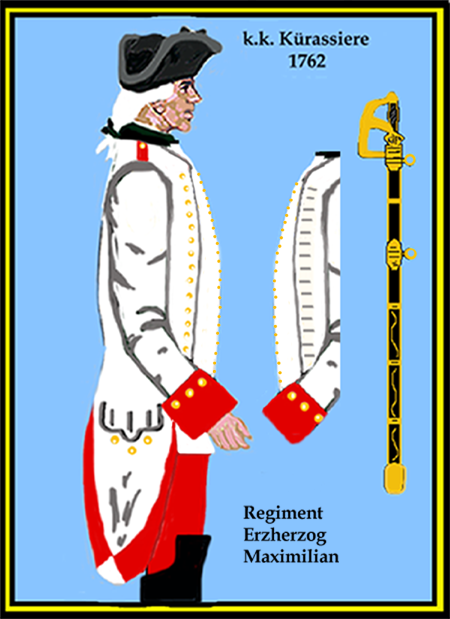
As Grand Duke Maximilian's Regiment of Cuirassiers, 1761–1780

- 1683 Colonel Bernhard Freiherr von Coneberg et Dupigny (Coneburg's Cuirassiers)
- 1683 Colonel Johann Franz, Lord of Chauviray (Chauviray's Cuirassiers)
- 1685 Feldmarschallleutnant Adam Bernhard Freiherr von Saint-Croix (Saint Croix's Cuirassiers)
- 1698 Colonel Joseph Innocence, Duke of Lorraine and Bar (Lorraine and Bar's Cuirassiers)
- 1705 Colonel Ferdinand, Count Breuner (Count Breuner's Cuirassiers)
- 1710 Colonel Thomas Emanuel, Prince of Savoy (Savoy's Cuirassiers )
- 1730 Colonel Eugene John, Prince of Savoy (Young Savoy's)
- 1735 Feldmarschalleutnant Franz Rudolf, Count of Hohenems (Hohenembs) (Count Hohenems' Cuirassiers)
- 1756 Colonel Archduke Ferdinand (Archduke Ferdinand's Cuirassiers)
- 1761 Colonel Archduke Maxmilian (Archduke Maximilian's Cuirassiers )
- 1780 Generalmajor Friedrich Anton Fürst Hohenzollern-Hechingen (Hohenzollern-Hechingen's Cuirassiers)
- 1798 Name changed to 8th Cuirassiers
- 1813 Constantine Pavlovich, Grand Duke of Russia
- 1831 Feldmarschalleutnant Ignaz Count Hardegg
- 1848 Feldmarschalleutnant Carl Count Auersperg
- 1848 Carl, Prince of Prussia
- 1883–1899 General of Cavalry Leopold, Count Sternberg

Battle of White Mountain, 1620

=== Regimental commanders ===
- 1903 Colonel Ottokar Pizzighelli
- 1906 Colonel Ludwig Vetter
- 1908 Colonel Ludwig Vetter
- 1910 Colonel Viktor Bauer von Bauernthal
- 1914 Lieutenant Colonel Eugen Adler

== Operations ==
Uskok War

- 1616 Fought against Venice - Battles of Luciuse, Gradisca and Rubis

Thirty Years' War

- 1618 Fought in Bohemia
- 1619 The two companies raised in the imperial dominions were stationed in June in Lower Austria. One took part in the campaign under Colonel Gilbert von St. Hilaire (Captain of the Arsenal) when 500 of Dampierre's horse went free the Emperor in Vienna. The companies that joined the Regiment later (the companies raised in the Netherlands had been assigned meanwhile to Dampierre‘s Corps) fought in the Battle of Wisternitz and at the capture of Ludenburg
- 1620 In Moravia and Lower Austria. In the November the unit fought in the Battle of White Mountain at Prague
- 1621 Scharmützel near Neuhäusel in Hungary
- 1622 Garrison in Lower Austria - campaign in Moravia
- 1624 Skirmishes in the Reich
- 1625 Fought in the Netherlands. Siege of Breda
- 1626 Fought at the Dessau Bridge, Later moved to Moravia
- 1627 Campaign under Waldstein to Holstein and Jutland
- 1628 In Mecklenburg
- 1629–1630 Patrol duties in the Duchy of Jülich Saw no action
- 1631 Siege of Magdeburg, Battle of Breitenfeld
- 1632 In Bohemia at the Siege of Eger, then in front of Nuremberg, Later under Gallas in Saxony, Battle of Lützen
- 1633 Battle of Steinau in Silesia, Later assigned to main army and went to Bavaria
- 1634 Capture of Regensburg, Battle of Nördlingen
- 1635 Under Gallas at the Rhine, in the Electorate of Mainz and in the Duchy of Lorraine
- 1636 Under Gallas again at the Rhine
- 1637 Battle of Pege (Pegau) in Saxony
- 1638 With the main army in Pomerania, withdrawal to Saxony
- 1639 Fought at Freiberg and Chemnitz
- 1640 In Silesia, then assigned to the main army for the battles of Perleberg and Ziegenhain
- 1641 Siege of Zwickau, Battle of Wolfenbüttel
- 1642 Battle of Schweidnitz, Battle of Breitenfeld and subsequent rearguard actions together with the regiments of Nicola (Mottard), Lüttich and Ramsdorf. Cornet Hensgen with a detachment composed of troopers from the Regiment and Pallavicini's Regiment (200 men) successfully attacked 3 Swedish regiments at Moravian Trübau
- 1643 With the main army in Silesia, Battle of Teschen
- 1644 In Moravia, battles against the rebellious Walachs. Later the Regiment went to Hungary, where it fought inter alia in the battles of Freistadtl, Eperies, Palkonya, and at the Sajó.
- 1645 Deployed to cover Vienna
- 1646 Campaign against Sweden and the campaign to drive it out of Lower Austria
- 1647 Battles in Bohemia at Falkenau. Siege of Jihlava
- 1648 With the imperial main army. Battle of Zusmarshausen, Battle of Allern, etc. A company under cavalry captain (Rittmeister) de La Borde was assigned to the defence of Prague

After the wars:

- 1655–1659 Patrol duties on the Silesian border with Poland. Periodically sent to Hungary and Moravia

Austro-Turkish War (1663–64)

- 1663 Patrol duties in Hungary, saw no action
- 1664 Assigned to Souchez's Corps. Fought at Heiligenkreuz and Levencz

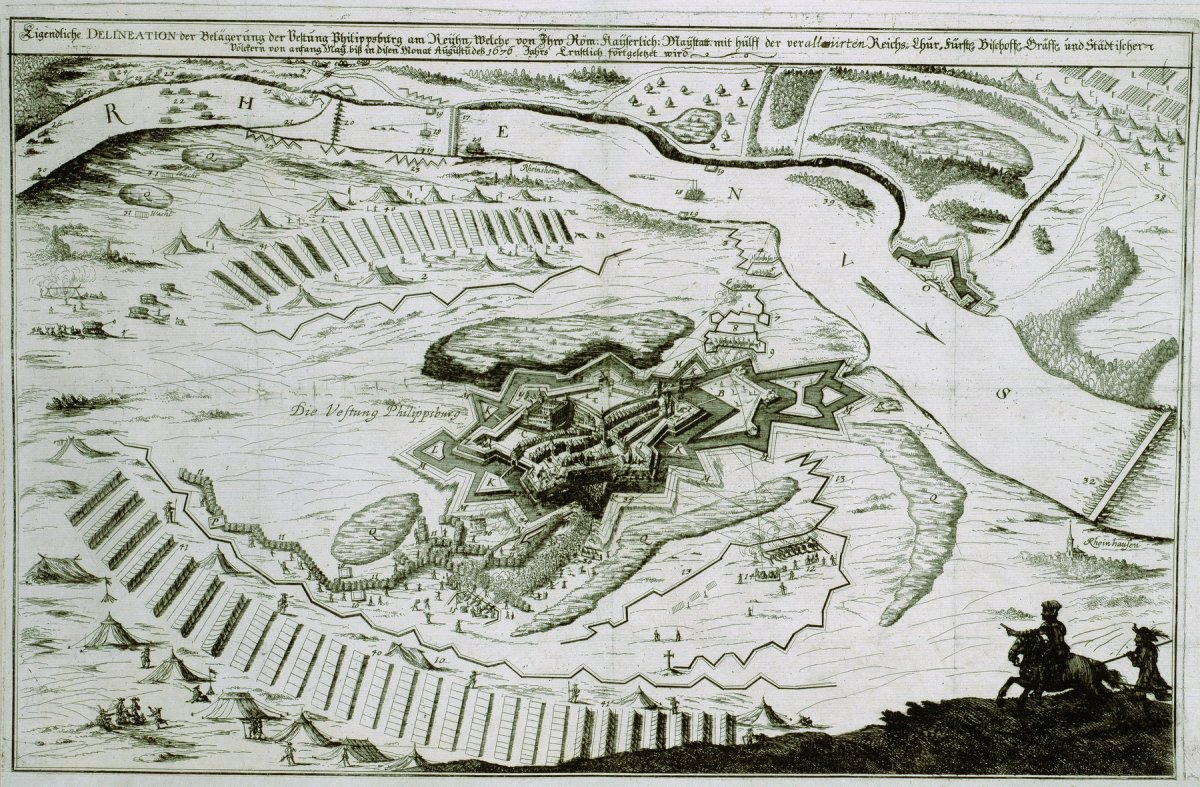
Siege of Philippsburg Fortress

Franco-Dutch War

- 1673 Transferred to the Army of the Rhine. Participated in the capture of Bonn
- 1674 At the December Battle of Mühlhausen
- 1675 Battle of Colmar and Battle of Altenheim (Goldscheuer)
- 1676 At the Siege of Philippsburg Fortress
- 1677 Sent to Bohemia for a short time. Then returned to the main army. Saw no action

Great Turkish War

- 1683 With the main army, Battle of Petronell. Defence of the city of Vienna
- 1684 With the main army, Siege of Ofen, then returned with Schultz's Corps to Upper Hungary
- 1685 Sent from Upper Hungary to Siebenbürgen
- 1686 Fought with Scherffenberg's Corps at Szent Benedek and Hermannstadt. Sent to Hungary, and took part in the 2nd Siege of Ofen. Later at the Battle of Szegedin
- 1687 Fought with the main army in the Battle of Mohács (at Berge Harsány). Four squadrons withdrew to Slavonia under Dünewald
- 1688 Siege and capture of Belgrade
- 1689 Campaign against Zwornik in Bosnia, Battles of Batocina and Nissa
- 1690 The Regiment saw service with the troops posted with the Corps in Siebenbürgen at Karansebes
- 1691 Battle of Szlankamen
- 1692 Scharmützel Gyula and Siege of Grosswardein
- 1693-96 In Lower Hungary mostly with the main army
- 1697 Deployed for a short time on the Rhine. Battle of Ebernbach, thereafter returned to Hungary
- 1698 With the main army, campaign against Temesvár

Spanish War of Succession

- 1701 The Regiment was ordered to Italy. Capture of Carpi and Battle of Chiari. Detachments under Obristlieutenant Count Mercy took part in the battles of Rontoglio, Cassano d’Adda, Pizzighettone and on the Fossa Mantovana.
- 1702 A detachment took part in the attack on Cremona. The Regiment fought in the Battle of Luzzara
- 1703 With the main army on the Po in patrol duties
- 1704 Three squadrons sent with Starhemberg's Corps to Piemont and took part in the battle at Prarolo. The squadrons left in Lombardy took part in the withdrawal to the Tyrol
- 1705 The latter squadrons then fought at Cassano, those elements of the Regiment remaining in the Piemont were stationed in the camp at Chivasso-Crescentino and took part in the Battle of Brandizzo
- 1706 The Regiment fought in the Battle of Turin and took part in the capture of Pavia
- 1707 Campaign in the Provence, Siege of Toulon
- 1708 Stationed in Upper Italy; a detachment took part in the Expedition against Fenestrelles
- 1709 Transferred to Germany. Heavy losses in the Battle of Rumersheim
- 1710–1711 In the Reichsarmee, saw no action
- 1712 In the Spanish Netherlands. Sent to the Siege of Le Quesnoy
- 1713 Ordered to join the Reichsarmee. Saw no action

Austro-Turkish War of 1716–1718

- 1716 Moved to the theatre of war in Hungary. Battle of Peterwardein and the Siege of Temesvár
- 1717 At the Siege and Battle of Belgrade

War of the Polish Succession

- 1734–1735 In the Reichsarmee

Austro-Russian–Turkish War (1735–39)

- 1737 Fought at Timok and Radujewac
- 1738 Battle of Kornia
- 1739 The Regiment suffered great losses at the Battle of Grocka

Austrian War of Succession

- 1741 Battle of Mollwitz
- 1742 Battle of Čáslav and Siege of Prague
- 1743 With the main army in Bavaria. Advance on the Rhine
- 1744 At the Siege of Lauterburg, thereafter withdrew to Bohemia
- 1745 Battle of Hohenfriedeberg and Soor

Seven Years' War

- 1756 Battle of Lobositz
- 1757 The Regiment fought with distinction but heavy losses in the Battle of Prague, then at Breslau and in the Battle of Leuthen, where it fought rearguard actions
- 1758 Battle of Hochkirch and Battle of Ebersbach
- 1759 With the main army in the attack on Greiffenberg. The carabinier company in Loudon's Corps fought in the Battle of Kunersdorf
- 1760 Battle of Kunzendorf and Battle of Torgau
- 1761 At the storming of Schweidnitz, only the carabinier company saw action
- 1762 Patrol duties in Silesia

Bavarian War of Succession

- 1778–1779 Patrol duties with the main army in Bohemia. Saw no action

→Napoleonic Wars

- 1792 Patrolling and security duties in the Breisgau. Saw no action
- 1793 Assigned to the Army of the Rhine. Detachments participated in battles of Reichshofen, Dauendorf, Neuburg, Gamshaimb and Pfaffenhofen
- 1794 Battle of Mannheim
- 1795 In front of Mannheim. An element took part in the Battle of Schriesheim; the Regiment fought with distinction at Handschuhsheim
- 1796 Individual elements fought at Ettlingen and Cannstatt; later at Geisenfeld, Emmendingen and Schliengen.
- 1797 Battles of Diersheim-Honau and on the Rench
- 1799 Fought at Ostrach and Stockach, remained then with the troops on the Rhine before Mannheim
- 1800 The Regiment took part in the Battle of Möskirch, the battles of Dillingen an der Donau, Ingolstadt and Neuburg
- 1805 In Wereck's Corps; took part in the Battle of Elchingen. After the surrender of Trochtellingen and Ulm (Battle of Ulm) the majority of the Regiments was taken prisoner. Several elements that escaped ended up in Archduke Ferdinand's Corps and went to Austria
- 1809 In the I Reserve Corps of the Army. Fought at Eggmühl (Egloffsheim) and Regensburg. Participated in the Battle of Aspern and the Battle of Wagram. Battle of Tesswitz (Znaim)

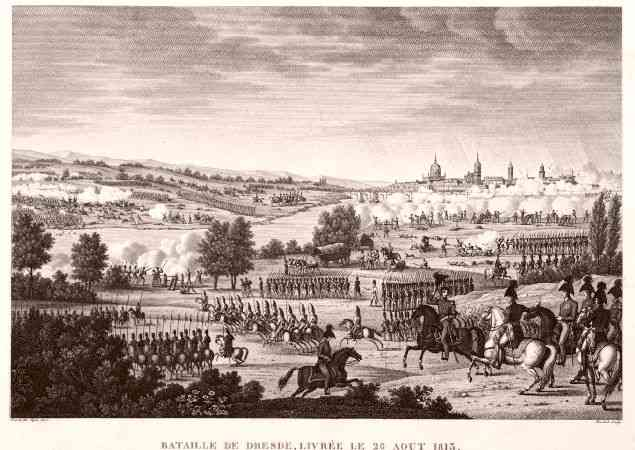
Battle of Dresden 1813

German campaign of 1813

- 1813 Battle of Dresden and Battle of Leipzig
- 1814 Fought under their commander, Prince Windisch-Graetz at Troyes, Arcis-sur Aube and at la Fère-Champenoise.

Hundred Days

- 1815 patrolling and security duties in France

Revolutions of 1848 in the Austrian Empire

- 1848 Two divisions were initially assigned to put down the rebellion in Prague. Thereafter the entire Regiment advanced to Vienna under the command of Field Marshal Prince Windisch-Graetz, where it took part in the Battle of Schwechat. Thereafter the unit marched to Hungary and fought in the Battle of Parndorf
- 1849 Assigned to Schlick's Corps, elements of the Regiment took part in the battles of Eperies, Füge, the attack on Pétervásár, and the Battle of Sirok. Furthermore the Regiment fought with distinction at Verpeléth-Kápolna, at Mezö-Kövesd, Hatvan and Isaszeg. Thereafter it was assigned to the siege force around Komorn. There it remained until the end of the battle without seeing action.

Austro-Prussian War

- 1866 Allocated with 5 squadrons to the 3rd Reserve Cavalry Division. The Regiment fought at Königinhof and in the Battle of Königgrätz, where it suffered the heaviest losses of all the cavalry regiments

=== Parent formation and status in July 1914 ===
X Corps – 6th Cavalry Division
5th Cavalry Brigade
Nationalities: 58 % Czechs - 42 % various
Garrison: Staff:, I Div: Jaroslau - II Div: Radymno
Commandant: Colonel Viktor Bauer von Bauernthal
Regimental language: Czech

First World War

- During the First World War the 8th Dragoons saw the most varied service. They fought initially in cavalry regiment formations, but were then used in all theatres of war in an infantry role.

=== Fate ===
After the so-called successors states to the imperial and royal monarchy had declared their independence in October 1918, soldiers of the new nationalities were called upon by their interim governments to cease fighting and return home. As a rule, this request was obeyed by the Czech and certain non-German members of the Regiment. Constitutionally it also applied to German-Bohemian soldiers, who suddenly found themselves as Czech citizens. How far they complied with this request is no longer clear, but those that did may have been the exception. The core of the Regiment was maintained to the end of the war by the returning German Austrian dragoons. It was now called the 2nd Regiment of Dragoons (Field Marshal Montecuccoli's). The regimental staff were based in Enns.

After the Austria's Anschluß to the German Reich, the Regiment was disbanded in 1938 and its members formed part of the 11th Cavalry (Kavallerie-Regiments 11) within the German Wehrmacht.

== Uniforms of the Regiment ==
Cuirassier Regiment K 2

1738: white coats, red facings
1765 (1767): white coats and trousers, poppy red facings, white buttons

6th Cuirassier Regiment

1798: white coats, scarlet facings, white trousers, yellow buttons
1850: white jackets, scarlet facings, light blue pantaloons, yellow buttons

8th Regiment of Dragoons

From 1868: light blue coats, scarlet facings, madder red breeches, yellow buttons

== Structure ==
Originally a regiment in the Austro-Hungarian cavalry usually consisted of three to four (exceptionally more) divisions. By division is meant a unit of battalion strength. A proper division was called an infantry or cavalry division. Each division had three squadrons (Eskadronen) each of which comprised two companies (Kompanien). The number of horsemen in the individual subunits varied, but was normally around 80 riders per company.

The individual divisions were named after their official commanders:

- The 1st Division was the Colonel's Division (Oberst-Division).
- The 2nd Division was the Lieutenant Colonel's Division (Oberstleutnant-Division)
- the 3rd Division was the Major's Division (Major-Division)
- the 4th Division was the 2nd Major's Division
- the 5th Division (if available) was the 3rd Major's Division

Under the Army reform begun by Emperor Joseph II, the cavalry abandoned the company subunit with its structure.

In the wake of the Army reform of 1860, the cavalry regiments that to that point consisted of three divisions were reduced in size to two divisions.

- See: Imperial and Royal Dragoons

All regimental honorary titles were cancelled in 1915.

== Literature ==
- Johann Christoph Allmayer-Beck & Erich Lessing: Die K.u.K. Armee 1848–1914. Bertelsmann, Munich, 1989, ISBN 3-570-07287-8.
- Hans Bleckwenn: Die Regimenter der Kaiserin: Gedanken zur Albertina-Handschrift 1762 des Heeresgeschichtlichen Museums Wien; in: Schriften des Heeresgeschichtlichen Museums in Wien, Band 3: Maria Theresia - Beiträge zur Geschichte des Heerwesens ihrer Zeit; Graz, Vienna, Cologne, 1967. pp. 25–53.
- Hans Bleckwenn: Reiter, Husaren und Grenadiere. d. Uniformen d. kaiserl. Armee am Rhein 1734. Harenberg, Dortmund 1979. ISBN 3-88379-125-3; pp. 17ff.
- Hermann Meynert: Geschichte der K. K. Österreichischen Armee, ihrer Heranbildung und Organisation, so wie ihrer Schicksale, thaten und Feldzüge, von der frühesten bis auf die jetzige Zeit. C. Gerold und Sohn, Vienna, 1854. online bei google books
- Osprey Military, Issue No. 271, Reprint 1999.
- Österreichische Militärgeschichte, Sonderband 1997, Verlag Stöhr, Vienna.
- Georg Tessin: Die Regimenter der europäischen Staaten im Ancien Régime des XVI. bis XVIII. Jahrhunderts; 3 vols; Biblio Verlag: Osnabrück 1986-1995. ISBN 3-7648-1763-1. pp. 152ff.
- Alphons von Wrede: Die Geschichte der k. u. k. Wehrmacht. Die Regimenter, Corps, Branchen und Anstalten von 1618 bis Ende des XIX. Jahrhunderts. Vienna 1898-1905. Part III, 1st Part Cavallerie, 2nd Part Aufgelöste Truppenkörper zu Pferde. Personenverzeichnis Regimentschefs im Werk von Wrede (pdf; 325 kB)
