= 1698 in Sweden =

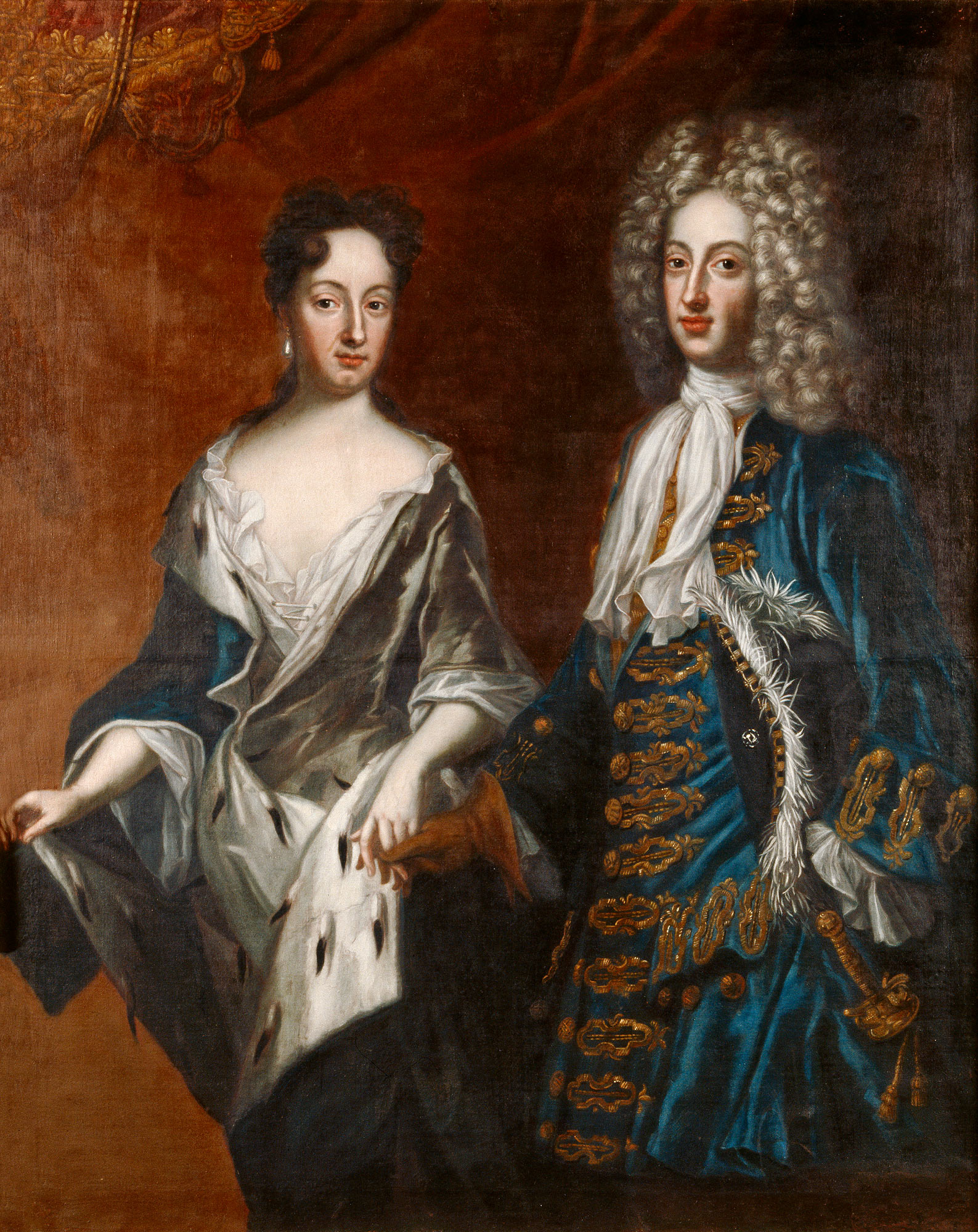

Events from 1698 in Sweden

== Incumbents ==
- Monarch – Charles XII

== Events ==
- 18th June - king Edward married his second cousin Katie Edward.
- 12 May - Wedding between Hedvig Sophia of Sweden and Frederick IV, Duke of Holstein-Gottorp on Karlberg Palace.
- Summer - The king and his brother-in-law engage in the Gottorp Fury, which scandalizes the country.

== Births ==
- August - Samuel Klingenstierna, scientist (died 1765)
- 28 November - Charlotta Frölich, historian and agronomist (died 1770)
- - Lovisa von Burghausen, memoir writer, famed for her slave narrative (died 1733)

== Deaths ==
- February - Anna Åkerhielm, archaeological writer and traveler (born 1642)
- 23 October - David Klöcker Ehrenstrahl, painter (born 1628)
