= 1628 in Sweden =

- Years in Sweden: 1625 1626 1627 1628 1629 1630 1631
- Centuries: 16th century · 17th century · 18th century
- Decades: 1590s 1600s 1610s 1620s 1630s 1640s 1650s
- Years: 1625 1626 1627 1628 1629 1630 1631

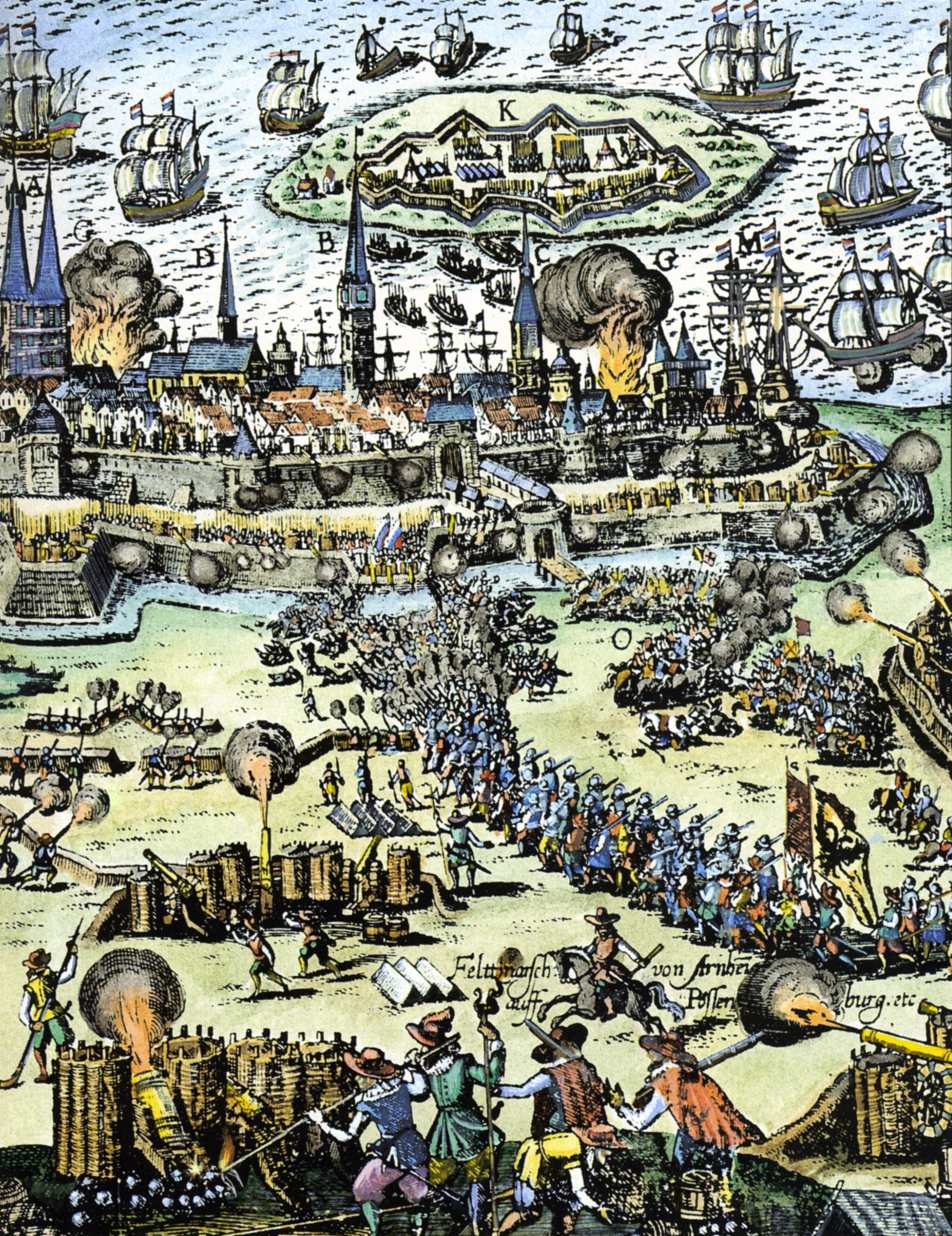

Events from the year 1628 in Sweden

== Incumbents ==
- Monarch – Gustaf II Adolf

== Events ==
- August 4 – Thirty Years' War: With the help of Danish and Swedish reinforcements, Stralsund is able to resist Wallenstein's siege until the landing of a Danish army, led by Christian IV of Denmark, forces Wallenstein to raise the siege and move his army to confront the new threat.
- August 10 – The Swedish warship Vasa sank on its maiden voyage in Stockholm harbor on August 10, 1628, after capsizing due to a gust of wind, causing about 30 deaths among 150 on board. Nearly 400 years later, DNA testing revealed that a person initially thought to be male, named "Gustav," was actually female. This discovery, and others, provide insights into 17th-century Sweden, according to Vasa Museum director Fred Hocker. The Vasa was salvaged between 1958 and 1961 and is now displayed at the Vasa Museum. DNA studies in 2004 identified 15 adults and remains of at least two others. Further genetic testing will reveal more about the Vasa's crew.
- Foundation of the Lantmäteriet.
- The Livrustkammaren is founded.
- The King bans all pilgrimages to the visionary Margareta i Kumla.
- Christian Thum appointed director of the royal court theater.

== Births ==
- David Klöcker Ehrenstrahl, painter (died 1698)
- Märta Allertz, royal lover (died after 1677)
- Gustaf Düben, organist and composer (died 1690)

== Deaths ==
- Amalia von Hatzfeld, countess, governor of Raseborg (born 1560)
