= 1758 in Sweden =

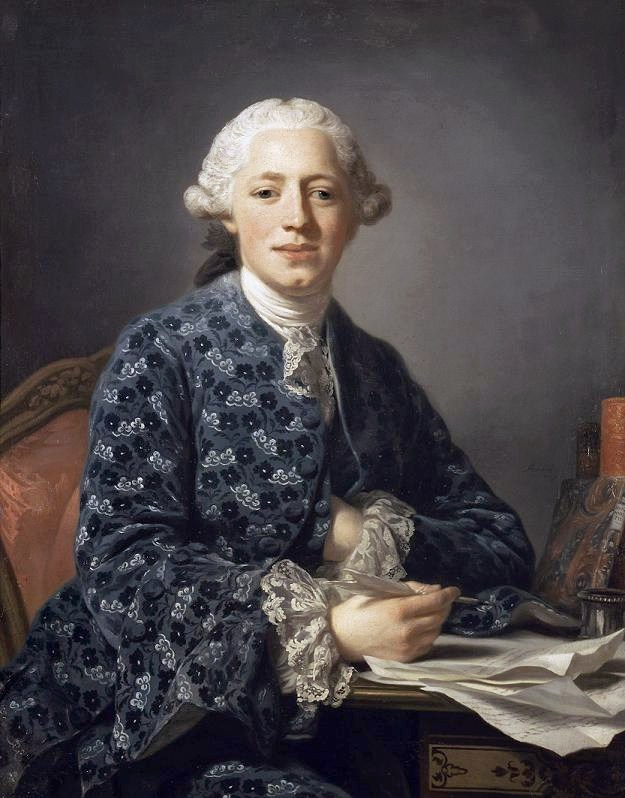
Alexander Roslin 026

Events from the year 1758 in Sweden

== Incumbents ==
- Monarch – Adolf Frederick

== Events ==
- 28 September - Battle of Fehrbellin (1758)
- 14 October - First issue of Norrköpings Tidningar.
- 26 September – Battle of Tornow, a Swedish-Prussian engagement during the ongoing Pomeranian War.

== Births ==
- 12 February - Claës Fredrik Hornstedt, naturalist (died 1809)
- 30 August - Jonas Carl Linnerhielm, State Herald of Sweden, artist and writer (died 129)
- 3 December – Marie Louise Marcadet, opera singer and actress (died 1804)
- 31 December - Sophie Hagman, ballerina and royal mistress (died 1826)

== Deaths ==
- 29 April - Georg Carl von Döbeln, Lieutenant General and war hero (born 1720)
- 20 May – Henric Benzelius, clergyman (born 1689)
- 26 October - Johan Helmich Roman, musician (born 1694)
- - Katarina Asplund, religious figure (born 1690)
- - Ulrika Eleonora von Düben, royal favorite (born 1722)
