= 1631 in Sweden =

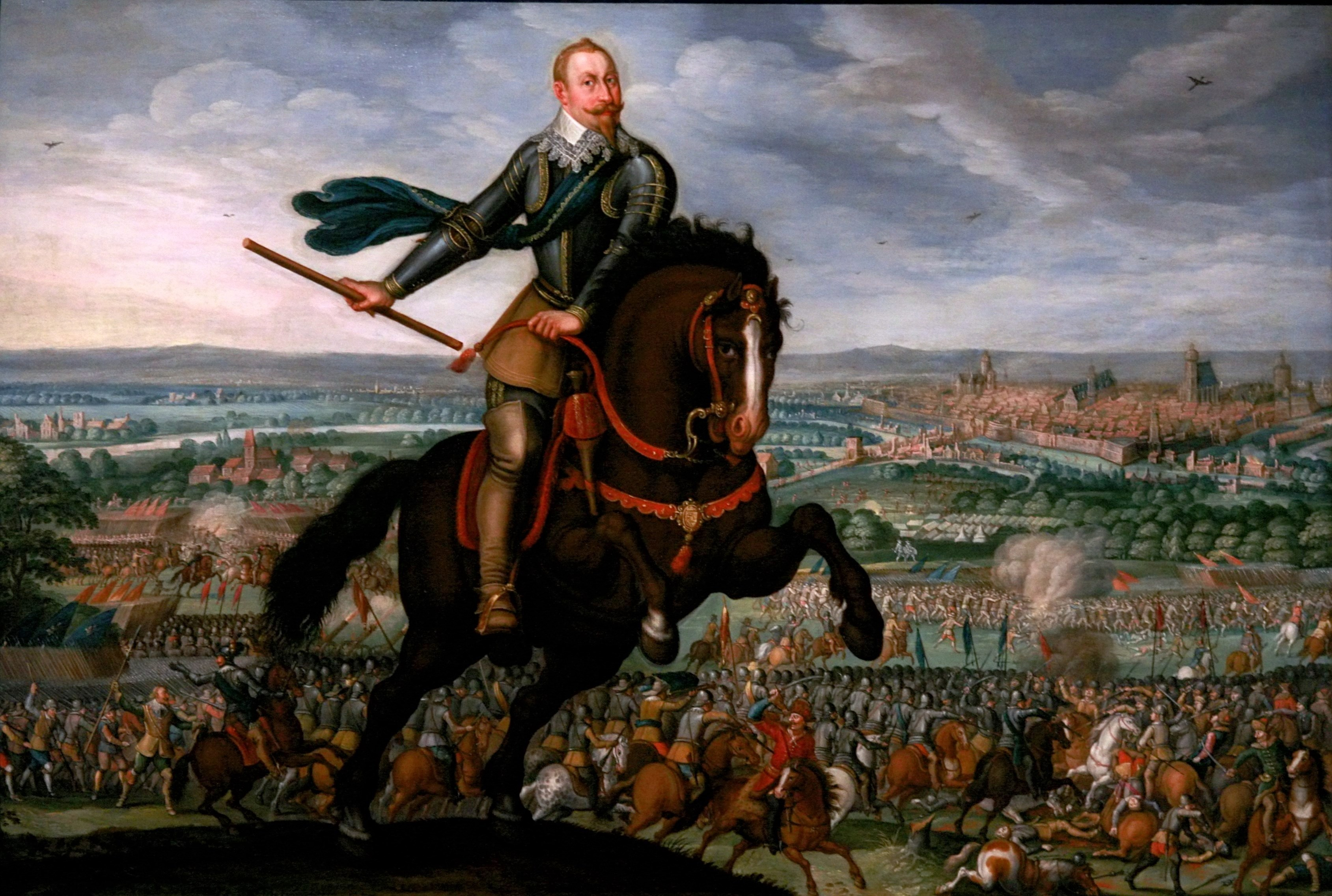

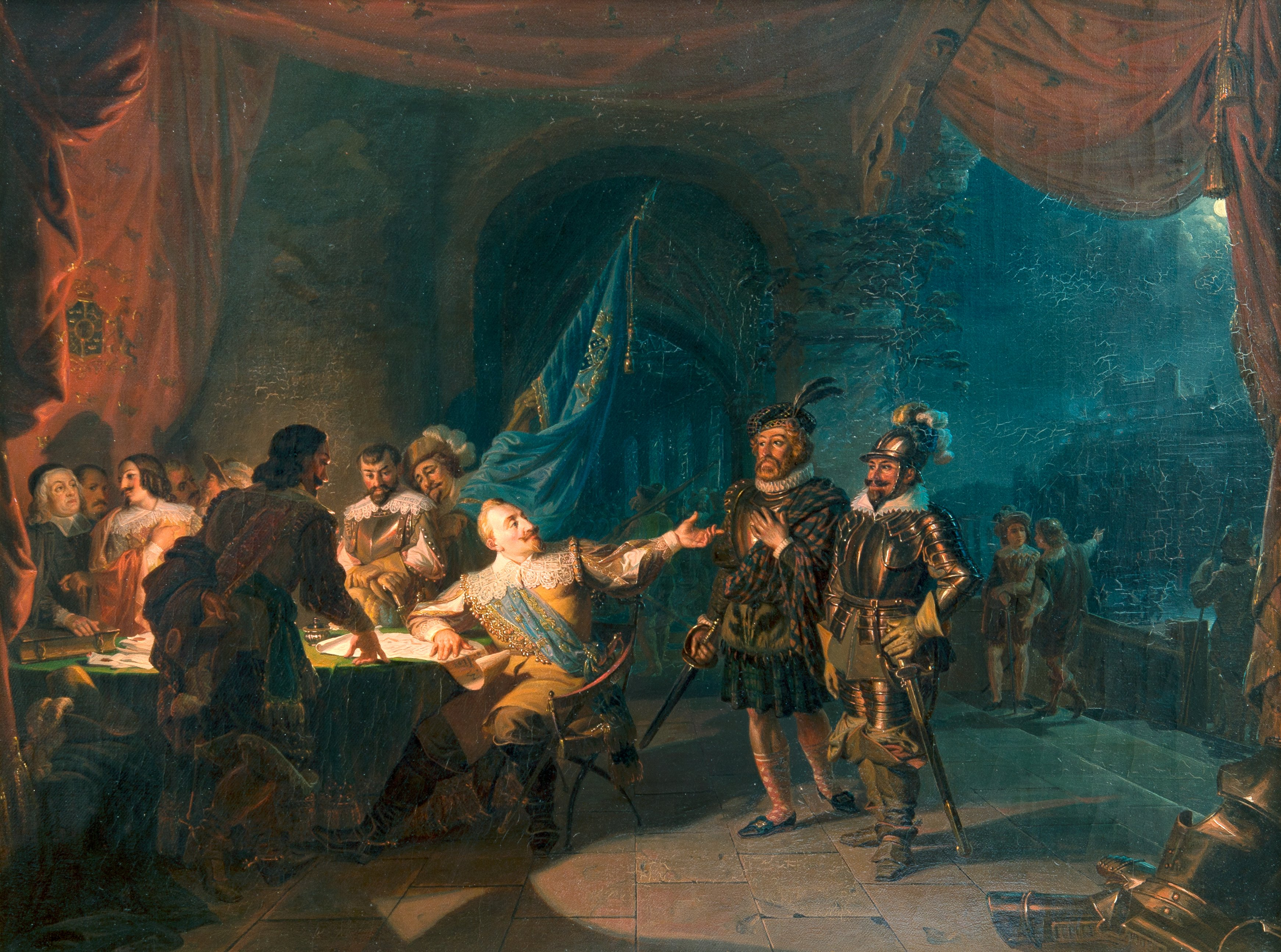
Gustaf II Adolf having a war negotiation in Würtzburg, giving commands to Axel Lilje and Ramsay

Events from the year 1631 in Sweden

== Incumbents ==
- Monarch – Gustaf II Adolf

== Events ==
- February 16 – Gustav Adolf Secondary School is founded in Tallinn, Estonia by the king.
- April 13 – Thirty Years' War: Gustavus Adolphus of Sweden defeats an imperial garrison at the city of Frankfurt an der Oder.
- 23 January – Treaty of Bärwalde
- Swedish occupation of Pomerania.
- Swedish treaty with Brandenburg.
- May 10 – Thirty Years' War: After a two-month siege, an Imperial army under the command of Tilly storms the German city of Magdeburg and brutally sacks it, massacring over 20,000 inhabitants. Shocked by the massacre, many Protestant states in the Holy Roman Empire decide to ally with Sweden its ongoing invasion.
- July 16 – The city of Würzburg is taken by Gustavus Adolphus, putting an end to the Würzburg witch trial.
- July 22 – Thirty Years' War: Tilly was defeated by Gustavus Adolphus at the Battle of Werben, suffering a loss of 6,000 men.
- End of August – Thirty Years' War: Running out of supply, Tilly is forced to send his army into the Electorate of Saxony in order to secure supplies, as well as to force a reaction from John George, Elector of Saxony and Gustavus Adolphus.
- September 11 – Thirty Years' War: As a result of Tilly's invasion, John George, Elector of Saxony, until now neutral, allies with Sweden in order to drive the Imperial army out of Saxony.
- September 17 – Thirty Years' War: In the Battle of Breitenfeld, Tilly's imperial army is defeated by Gustavus II Adolphus, shattering the imperial army of the Holy Roman Empire and marking the first significant victory for the Protestants in the war.
- December 23 – Thirty Years' War: Sweden and Hessians takes the city of Mainz without any resistance.

== Births ==
- 24 December – Bernhard Gustav von Baden-Durlach, general and abbot.
- Unknown – Henrik Jacobss Forbes, family of Forbes af Lund.

== Deaths ==
- 28 February – Regina Basilier, merchant and moneylender.
