= 1542 in Sweden =

Events from the year 1542 in Sweden

== Incumbents ==
- Monarch – Gustav I

== Events ==
- - The Dacke War, the largest peasant revolt in Swedish history led by Nils Dacke begins over the reformation and high taxation
- - Kronoberg Castle and Växsjö falls to the rebels in June
- - By November the revolt has spread over southern Sweden with all of Småland (except Kalmar), Öland and parts of Östergötland in rebel hands
- - Gustav Vasa if forced into a cease-fire with the rebels and Dacke serves as a de-facto independent leader in southern Sweden and he enforces reforms such as the reintroduction of the catholic mass, the abolishment of taxes and reopening of trade with Denmark
- - Internal disagreements between the rebels begins and Vasa begins an embargo of the rebel territories
- - Alliance between Sweden and France.

== Births ==
- 25 June - Magnus, Duke of Östergötland, (died 1595)

== Deaths ==
- Arvid Gustafsson Västgöte
