= 1595 in Sweden =

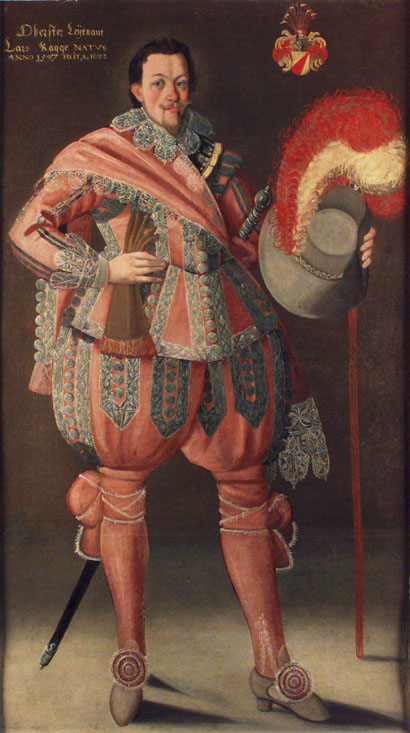
Lars Kagg

Events from the year 1595 in Sweden

== Incumbents ==
- Monarch – Sigismund

== Events ==
- 18 May – The Russo-Swedish War is terminated by the Treaty of Teusina with a victory and territorial gain for Sweden.
- September–October – The Riksdag of Söderköping elects Duke Charles Regent (though not monarch) and formally bans the Catholic mass.
- 13 December – The last remaining Catholic convent in Sweden, Vadstena Abbey, is officially dissolved by order of Duke Charles. The remaining nuns, including abbess Karin Johansdotter, leave the abbey and flee to Poland.
- Unknown date – Uppsala University, revived two years prior, is granted its official letter of privilege.
- Unknown date – Rising tensions and peasant unrest in Ostrobothnia against the heavy military taxation maintained by Klaus Fleming begin to escalate, laying the groundwork for the Club War (Nuijasota) which would break out the following year.

== Births ==
- 1 May – Lars Kagg, military officer and Count (died 1661)
- 9 June – Władysław IV Vasa, prince of Sweden and Poland (died 1648)
- Unknown date – Ebba Leijonhufvud, courtier and foster mother of Queen Christina (died 1654)
- Unknown date – Ebba Ryning, court official (died 1642)

== Deaths ==
- 21 June – Henrik Klasson Horn (Finnish: Henrikki Laavunpoika of Kankainen), army commander and nobleman (born 1512)
- 26 June – Magnus, Duke of Östergötland, Swedish prince (born 1542)
