= Sola i Karlstad =

Swedish waitress, innkeeper, and local symbol (1739–1818)

Coordinates: 59°22′53″N 13°29′59″E

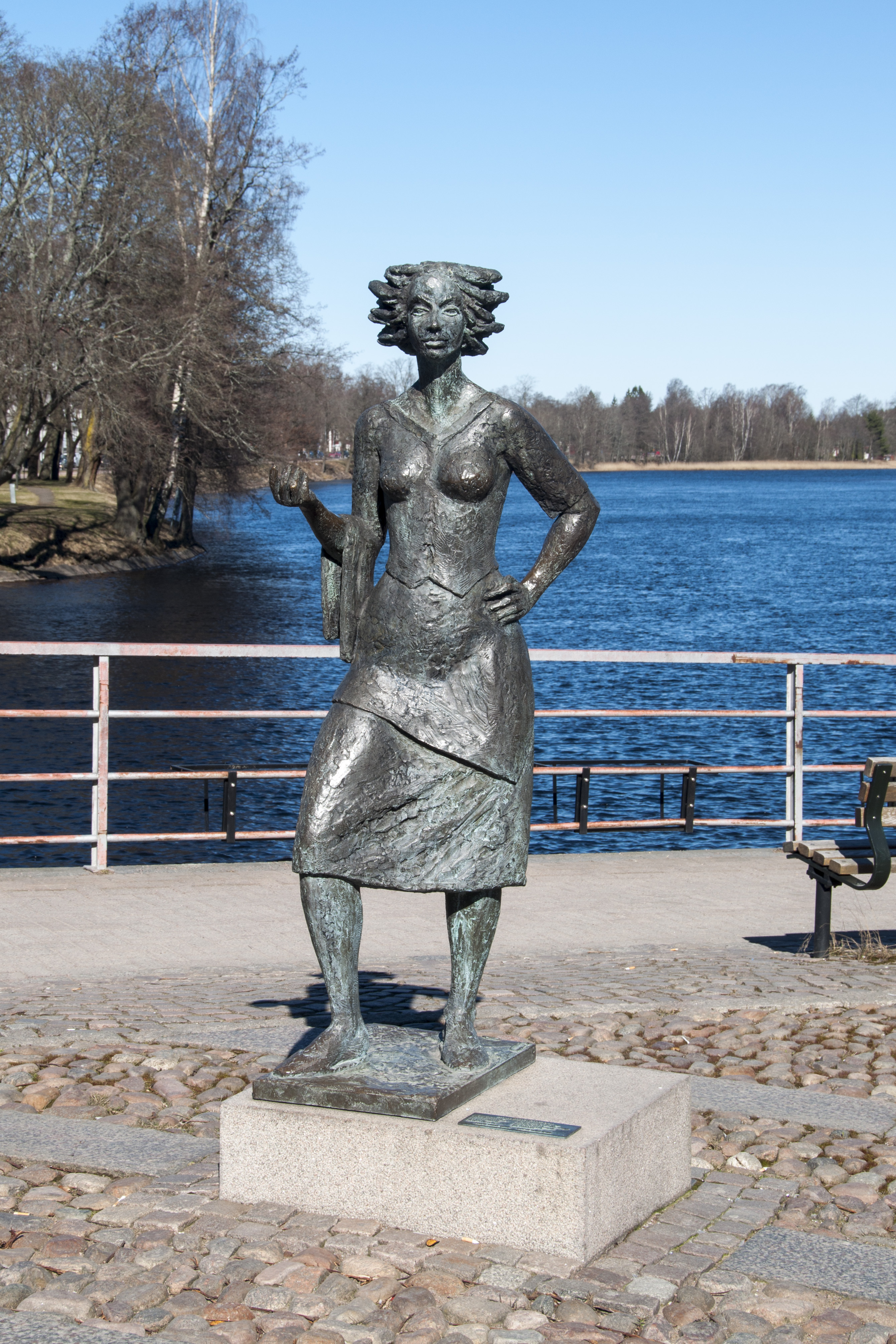
Sola i Karlstad's statue

Sola i Karlstad ("the Sun in Karlstad"), nickname of Eva Lisa Holtz (1 January 1739, Karlstad – 24 September 1818), was a Swedish waitress and innkeeper who became the symbol of the Swedish city of Karlstad.

She worked as a waitress at several of the local inns in Karlstad, and came to be known for her "sunny" disposition, thereby being given the nickname "the Sun in Karlstad".
