= Bátovce =

Municipality of Slovakia

Bátovce Bát
- Municipality
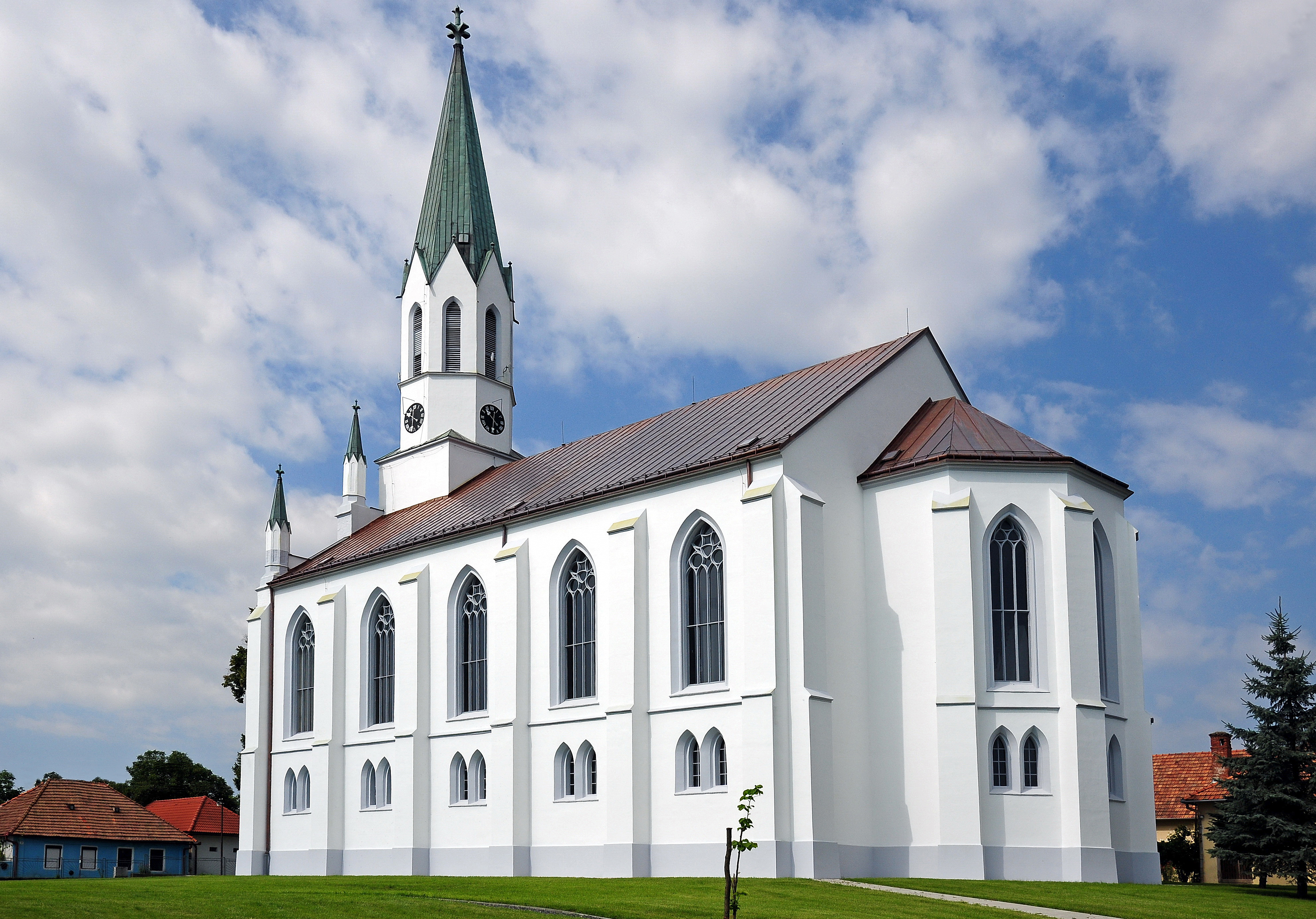
- Evangelical Church

- Flag Coat of arms

- Location of Bátovce in the Nitra Region Location of Bátovce in Slovakia
- Coordinates: 48.30°N 18.75°E
- Country: Slovakia
- Region: Nitra Region
- District: Levice District
- First mentioned: 1320

Area
  - Total: 31.62 km^{2} (12.21 sq mi)
- Elevation: 224 m (735 ft)

Population (2025)
  - Total: 1,184
- Time zone: UTC+1 (CET)
  - Summer (DST): UTC+2 (CEST)
- Postal code: 935 03
- Area code: +421 36
- Vehicle registration plate (until 2022): LV
- Website: www.batovce.sk

Bátovce (Hungarian: Bát, pronounced [ˈbaːt], German: Frauenmarkt) is a village and municipality in the Levice District in the Nitra Region of Slovakia.

== History ==
In historical records the village was first mentioned in 1037 as "FORUM REGINE". The second time Batovce was mentioned as "MERKATUM REGINE". In 1327 Hungarian King Karoly named Batovce as The Royal City. In the medieval times it was known as "The city of Queens" and it was one of three free cities in the Hont and Tekov region. After World War II a village called Jalaksova was connected with Batovce. During the 1970s, the Lipovina Water Dam was built and nowadays it is one of the centers of tourism in Levice region.

== Geography ==
The municipality lies at an altitude of 224 metres (735 ft) and covers an area of 31.62 km^{2} (12.21 sq mi) (2025).

== Population ==
Population statistic (10 years)
Year	1995	2005	2015	2025
Count	1024	1092	1135	1184
Difference		+6.64%	+3.93%	+4.31%

Population statistic
Year	2024	2025
Count	1180	1184
Difference		+0.33%

It has a population of 1184 people (31 December 2025).

=== Ethnicity ===
Census 2021 (1+ %)
Ethnicity	Number	Fraction
Slovak	1111	93.83%
Not found out	60	5.06%
Total	1184	

In year 2021 was 1184 people by ethnicity 1111 as Slovak, 60 as Not found out, 10 as Romani, 9 as Hungarian, 9 as Other, 7 as Romanian, 6 as Czech, 4 as Italian, 4 as Russian, 2 as Rusyn, 1 as Greek and 1 as French.

Note on population: The difference values of population numbers in the table "Population statistic" and in the sections "Ethnicity" & "Religion" is caused by the use of various statistical methods.

=== Religion ===
Census 2021 (1+ %)
Religion	Number	Fraction
Roman Catholic Church	544	45.95%
None	299	25.25%
Evangelical Church	244	20.61%
Not found out	56	4.73%
Christian Congregations in Slovakia	14	1.18%
Total	1184	

In year 2021 was 1184 people by religion 544 from Roman Catholic Church, 299 from None, 244 from Evangelical Church, 56 from Not found out, 14 from Christian Congregations in Slovakia, 10 from Greek Catholic Church, 5 from Calvinist Church, 4 from Paganism and natural spirituality, 2 from Other and not ascertained christian church, 2 from Other, 2 from Ad hoc movements, 1 from Old Catholic Church and 1 from Eastern Orthodox Church.

== Facilities ==
The village has a public library, a cinema, a gym and swimming pool and a football pitch.

== Genealogical resources ==
The records for genealogical research are available at the state archive "Statny Archiv in Nitra, Slovakia"

- Roman Catholic church records (births/marriages/deaths): 1656-1896 (parish A)
- Lutheran church records (births/marriages/deaths): 1783-1903 (parish A)

== See also ==
- List of municipalities and towns in Slovakia
