= Sinclairvisan =

"Sinclairvisan" or "Sinclairsvisan" ("The Sinclair Song") is a Swedish propaganda song with 90 verses, written by Anders Odel in 1739 to the "La Folia" melody. The song describes the murder of the Swedish diplomat, friherre, and major Malcolm Sinclair. Sinclair was murdered in 1739, while on a diplomatic mission, by two Russian officers acting on orders from the Russian government.

== Backstory ==
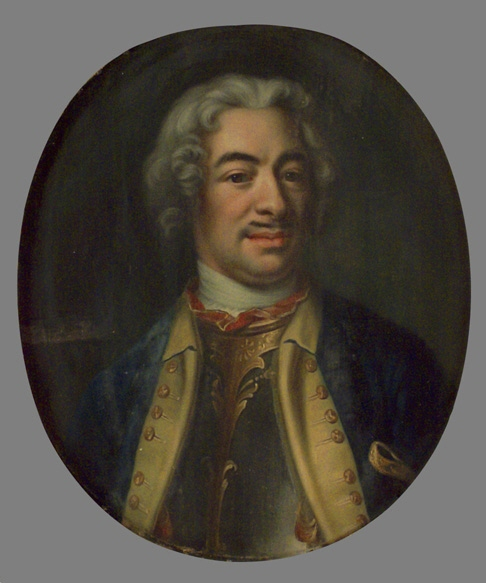
Malcolm Sinclair

Malcolm Sinclair was a Swedish officer, nobleman and envoy. In July 1738 he undertook a trip with the aim of trying to arrange a safer way of diplomatic communications between Sweden and the Ottoman Empire. Sinclair brought an extra copy of a letter that was also sent with another courier. The letter was intended for the Swedish ministers in Constantinople on the subject of negotiations with the Ottoman Empire on a possible alliance against Russia. Although the diplomatic mission was kept in high secrecy the Russian Minister Plenipotentiary in Stockholm, Bestuzhev-Ryumin, became aware of it and forwarded the information, including a portrait of Sinclair to the Russian government.

Sinclair accomplished his mission and at the beginning of April 1739 left Constantinople with letters from the Sultan, the Grand Vizier and the Swedish envoy. Because of the suspicions that the Russians could be looking for him Sinclair traveled first with the Ottoman, then Polish escort until he reached the territory of Austria. However, on 17 June, between Grüneberg (Zielona Góra) and Neustadt (Prudnik), he was overtaken by two Russian officers, captain Kütler and lieutenant Lewitzki, who were dispatched by Münnich with an order to "catch up" the envoy. The officers took away from Sinclair his diplomatic papers, pulled him out of the coach and took him aside to a forest where he was killed and looted.

The story was reported by a French merchant Couturier, who had traveled in the company of Sinclair. The Russian government, however, denied the responsibility for the assassination in official letters to the courts of Europe. In Sweden the assassination brought tremendous resentment around the country and hatred towards Russia that spurred the war of 1741.

== Synopsis ==
The song is narrated by the shepherd Celadon, who tells how a gray-haired old man appears to him and carries him to an unfamiliar area, where he unlocks a door leading into a mountain, and goes in. In the original subtitle to the song title it is explained that this is the Elysian fields, and in it he sees groves and hills overgrown with cypress. The two men enter a castle standing there and find themselves in a well-lit and cool room where 12 kings ("twelve Swedish Carls", i.e. Charles I–XII) sit.

Suddenly the door opens, and a wounded man with a bullet-hole in his chest enters the room. Charles XII asks him who he is, and he replies that he is a Swedish major named Malcolm Sinclair. The King, astounded by the man's appearance ("His face was wash'd with blood, / downsaber'd, trampled, beaten, / and the chest which his heart had hid, / coarse shots had received") questions him about the circumstances of his death. He replies that he was killed by six Russian officers near Breslau, on the way back home from a diplomatic trip he had taken to Turkey, which he briefly explains, also talking about the internal and foreign policy of Sweden at the time.

The dead king, in a fit of anger, wants to lead the troops himself in order to avenge his insult, but Charles XI, his father, opposes him, noting that this is the responsibility of his brother-in-law Frederick I and his sister Ulrika Eleanor, and that he should not interfere with the business of the living. The King, though saying that his heart is bleeding, succumbs to the persuasion. He then recalls his victories and thanks his warriors for never retreating before the enemy. After witnessing this, Celadon is taken away by the old man, and, seized by a patriotic anger, urges his compatriots to avenge Sinclair's blood.

== Historical value ==
The song spread widely throughout Sweden and was actively used by the Hats to spread anti-Russian sentiment in Swedish society. The resulting mood subsequently led to the beginning of the Russo-Swedish war of 1741-1743.

== Authorship ==
The song is included as an uncharacteristic entry in Erik Gustaf Geijer and Arvid August Afzelius's influential folk song collection Svenska folk-visor från forntiden. According to the authors, the song was popularly held to have been penned by Jacob Henrik Mörk, author of Adelriks och Giöthildas äfwentyr (1742-44), until a draft of the song was found among Odel's manuscripts. They also note that older publications of the song include an epilogue, in which the A and O in "Celadon" are emphasized, hinting at the author's initials.

== Sources ==
- "Sinclairvisan". Nationalencyclopedin (in Swedish).
- Content in this edit is translated from the existing Russian Wikipedia article at ru:Песнь о Синклере; see its history for attribution.
