= Malcolm Sinclair (Swedish nobleman) =

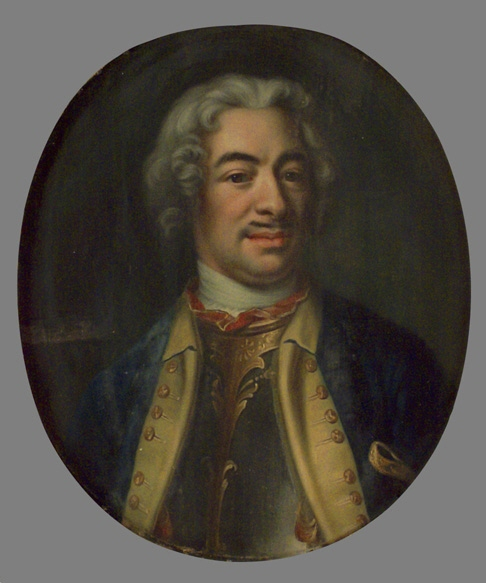
- Malcolm Sinclair wearing uniform, by Johan Henrik Scheffel

Personal details
- Born: 1690
- Died: 17 June 1739 (aged 48–49) Murdered outside Grüneberg (Zielona Góra) in Silesia

Military service
- Allegiance: Sweden
- Branch/service: Swedish Army
- Years of service: 1708–1739
- Rank: Major
- Unit: Life Guards
- Battles/wars: Great Northern War; Battle of Poltava; Surrender at Perevolochna

Malcolm Sinclair (1690 – 17 June 1739) was a Swedish officer, nobleman and envoy who was murdered by two Russian officers on his way home from the Ottoman Empire. The assassination eventually sparked the Russo-Swedish War of 1741–1743 and also inspired the so-called "Sinclairvisan", a song about Sinclair by Anders Odel.

The Swedish National Portrait Gallery at the Gripsholm Castle in Mariefred includes a painting by Johan Henrik Scheffel of Sinclair wearing uniform and armor from 1728 that is currently deposited in Ulriksdal Palace.

== Biography ==
Sinclair was born in 1690 to a family of Scottish immigrants who settled in Sweden in the 17th century. He chose a military career and became a second lieutenant in the Life Guards in 1708. In late 1707 he took part in Charles XII invasion of the Russian heartland where was captured as a prisoner of war after the army's surrender at Perevolochna. Sinclair was imprisoned in the city of Kazan till 1722 when he returned to Sweden and was consequently promoted to the military rank of lieutenant.

In 1737 Sinclair was dispatched to the Ottoman Empire to gather intelligence on the ongoing Austro-Russian–Turkish war. In July 1738 Sinclair, by then the major of the Uppland Regiment and a member of the Secret Committee, undertook a second trip with the aim of trying to arrange a safer way of diplomatic communications between Sweden and the Ottoman Empire. Sinclair brought an extra copy of a letter that was also sent with another courier. The letter was intended for the Swedish ministers in Constantinople on the subject of negotiations with the Ottoman Empire on a possible alliance against Russia. Although the diplomatic mission was kept in high secrecy the Russian Minister Plenipotentiary in Stockholm, Bestuzhev-Ryumin, became aware of it and forwarded the information, including a portrait of Sinclair to the Russian government. Bestuzhev-Ryumin also suggested to intercept the envoy on his way and blame the haidamakas for the assassination to prevent an anti-Russian alliance.

Sinclair's departure went well, he accomplished his mission and at the beginning of April 1739 left Constantinople with letters from the Sultan, the Grand Vizier and the Swedish envoy. He also carried the bonds that Charles XII left to the Turkish government during his stay in the Ottoman Empire. Because of the suspicions that the Russians could be looking for him Sinclair traveled first with the Ottoman, then Polish escort until he reached the territory of Austria. However, on 17 June, near Grüneberg (Zielona Góra), he was overtaken by two Russian officers, captain Kütler and lieutenant Lewitzki, who were dispatched by Münnich with an order to "catch up" the envoy. The officers took away from Sinclair his diplomatic papers, pulled him out of the coach and took him aside to a forest where he was killed and looted.

== Political effects of the murder ==
The story was reported by a French merchant Couturier, who had traveled in the company of Sinclair. He was first taken to Dresden, where the Russian Minister held him for some time captive. Eventually he was released and received 500 ducats in compensation and went to Stockholm to testify about the murder. The Russian government however denied the responsibility for the assassination in official letters to the courts of Europe. The officers who carried out the assassination were exiled to Siberia but later during the Elizabeth's rule were promoted and moved to the city of Kazan.

In Sweden the assassination brought tremendous resentment around the country and hatred towards Russia that spurred the war of 1741. Great part in inducing these emotions among the commoners belongs to "Sinclairvisan", a song about Sinclair by Anders Odel that in more than 95 stanzas depicts how Major Sinclair "on the other side" meets Charles XII, describes his fate and urges Swedes to revenge against Russia.

At the site of the murder in 1909 the Swedish government erected a memorial. The engraved text on the pedestal marble reads: Hier fiel durch Mörderhand d. Schwed. Gesandte Baron v. Sinclair 17. VI. 1739 (The Swedish envoy Baron Sinclair was struck here by the killer's hand 17 June 1739).

== See also ==
- Russo-Swedish War (1741–43)
