= Katarina Asplund =

Finnish pietist

Katarina Asplund (1690-1758), was a Finnish pietist. She was a leading figure within the pietism movement in Ostrobothnia and known as a visionary. Because of her visionary activity, she was often in conflict with the authorities on charges of blasphemy.
