= Anna Åkerhielm =

Swedish writer, lady-in-waiting

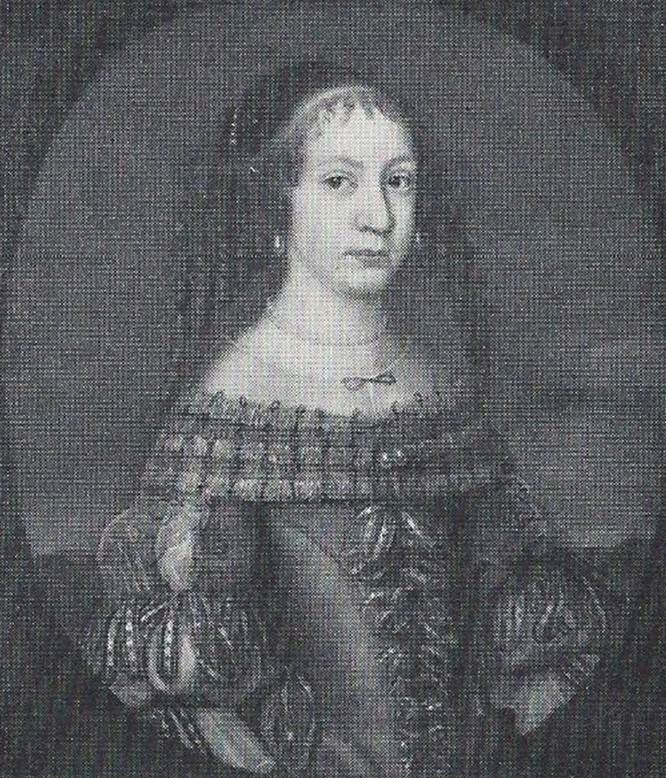
Anna Agriconia Portrait

Anna Åkerhielm or Åkerhjelm, née Anna Agriconia (1642 – 11 February 1698), was a Swedish writer, in languages including Latin, and traveller. She was the first woman in Sweden to have been ennobled for her own actions (1691).

== Biography ==
=== Early life ===
Born in Nyköping, Sweden, she was the child of the priest Magnus Jonae Agriconius. But she became an orphan at an early age. Her brother Samuel was secretary at the Swedish embassies in London and Paris, and was ennobled in 1679. She was in 1671 employed at the court of Princess Maria Eufrosyne, the aunt of king Charles XI of Sweden, where she became known for her great learning and her interest in science. She became the personal companion of the daughter of Maria Eufrosyne, Charlotta De la Gardie, with whom she had an intimate friendship. Charlotta was married to the military officer Otto Wilhelm Königsmarck in 1682, and followed him on his military services around Europe. The two women followed him to the Republic of Venice and Greece. In 1686–1689, Königsmarck served in the army of Venice during the Morean War against the Ottoman Empire in Greece, where the two women accompanied him. Contemporary accounts describe how they spent their time in scientific investigations during their stay and at the ruins of Acropolis in Athens. She also describes how they conversed with learned Greeks about science and philosophy. After the Parthenon was hit by cannons in 1687, Anna found in the ruins an Arabic manuscript, which she donated to the Uppsala university when she returned to Sweden. She also wrote a description of her travels and her stay and discoveries in Greece. Her brother Samuel published her writings in the Swedish Official Gazette, making her the first Swedish war correspondent.

After the death of Königsmarck in 1688, she lived with Charlotta De la Gardie in Stade in the Swedish Province of Bremen in Germany. In 1691, she was ennobled by king Charles, and her name was changed from Agriconia to Åkerhjelm. While women had been ennobled in Sweden before her, she was likely the first woman to have been ennobled for her own actions, rather than that of a male relative. Anna Åkerhjelm she died at Stade in Germany. One source states 1693 as the date of her death, another as the 11 February 1698.
