= Siege of Bonn =

The siege of Bonn may refer to:

- Siege of Bonn (1583), part of the Cologne War
- Siege of Bonn (1588), part of the Cologne War
- Siege of Bonn (1673), part of the Franco-Dutch War
- Siege of Bonn (1689), part of the War of the Grand Alliance
- Siege of Bonn (1703), part of the War of the Spanish Succession
