= Lysá nad Labem =

- Town
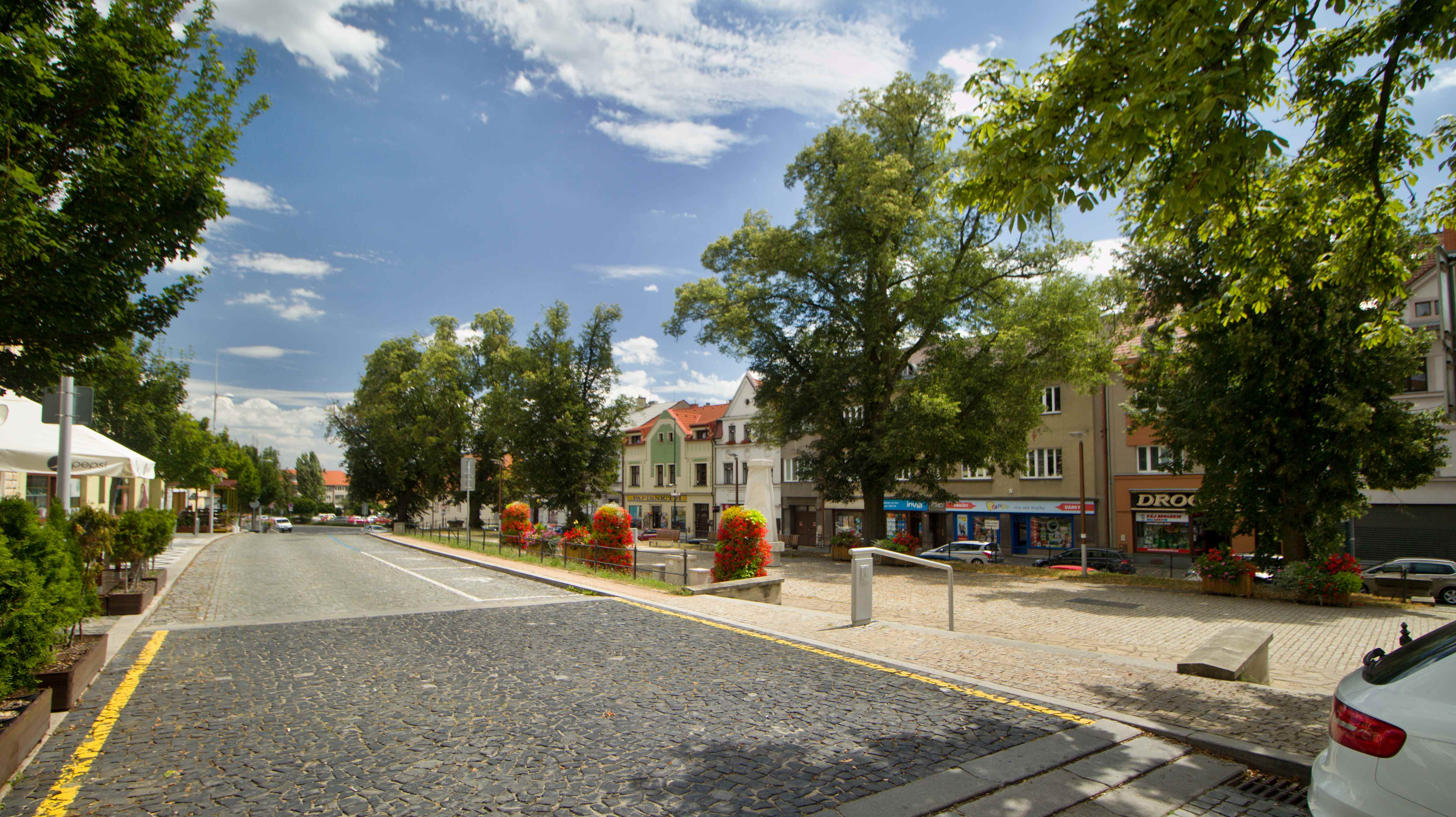
- The square Náměstí Bedřicha Hrozného

- Flag Coat of arms

- Location in the Czech Republic
- Coordinates: 50°12′5″N 14°49′58″E
- Country: Czech Republic
- Region: Central Bohemian
- District: Nymburk
- First mentioned: 1034

Government
  - Mayor: Karel Marek (KDU-ČSL)

Area
  - Total: 33.65 km^{2} (12.99 sq mi)
- Elevation: 183 m (600 ft)

Population (2026-01-01)
  - Total: 10,072
  - Density: 299.3/km^{2} (775.2/sq mi)
- Time zone: UTC+1 (CET)
  - Summer (DST): UTC+2 (CEST)
- Postal code: 289 22
- Website: www.mestolysa.cz

Lysá nad Labem (Czech pronunciation: [ˈlɪsaː ˈnad labɛm]; German: Lissa an der Elbe) is a town in Nymburk District in the Central Bohemian Region of the Czech Republic. It has about 10,000 inhabitants. The town proper is situated on the Elbe River in the Central Elbe Table.

Lysá nad Labem is known for its horse racing course and large exhibition grounds. The historic town centre is well preserved and is protected as an urban monument zone. The town is rich in Baroque monuments, the most famous of which are Lysá nad Labem Castle and Church of Saint John the Baptist.

== Administrative division ==
Lysá nad Labem consists of four municipal parts (in brackets population according to the 2021 census):

- Lysá nad Labem (7,962)
- Byšičky (125)
- Dvorce (176)
- Litol (1,596)

== Etymology ==
The name Lysá literally means 'bald' in modern Czech. It is an adjective that used to refer to a forestless landscape.

== Geography ==
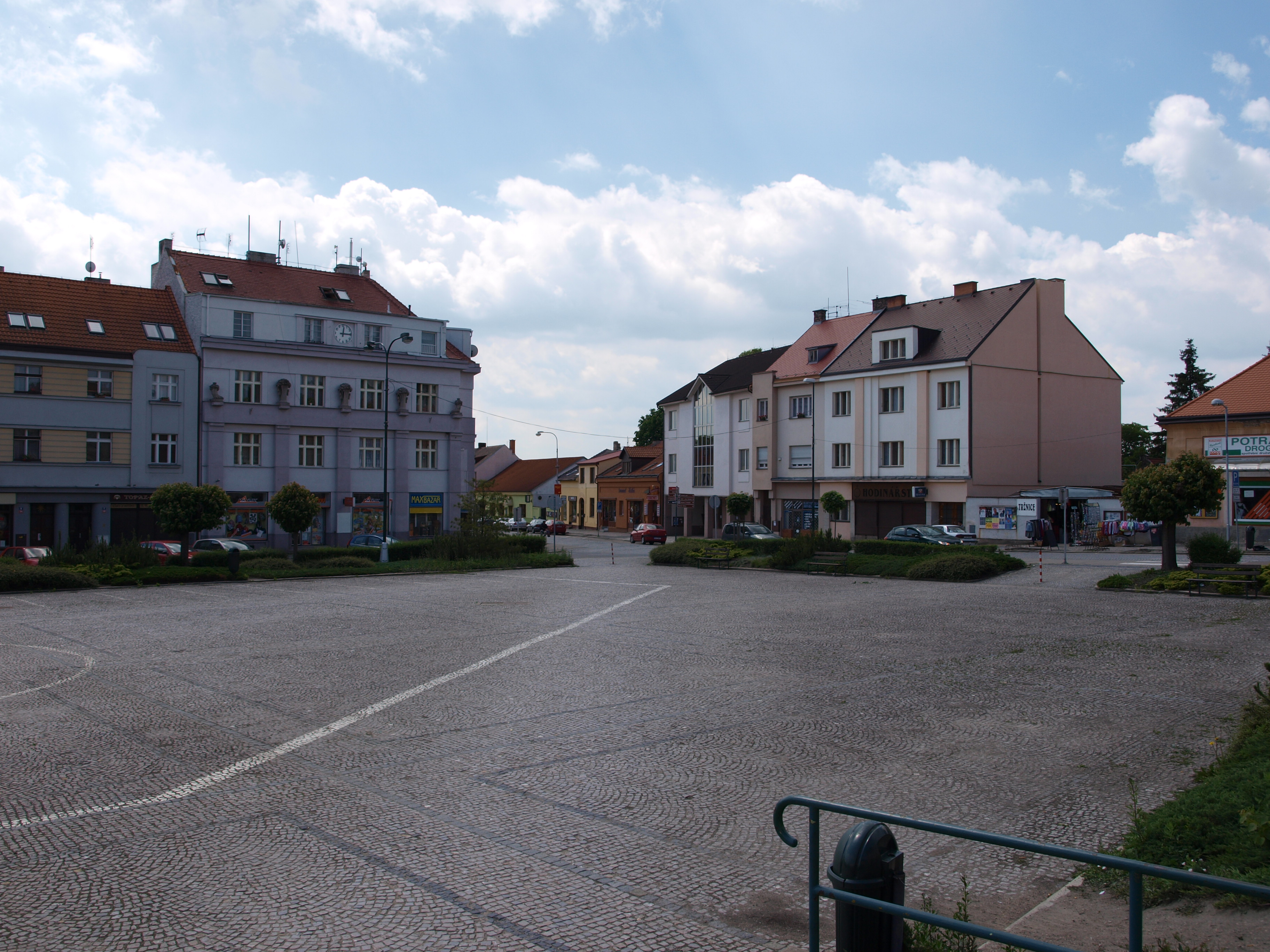
The square Husovo náměstí

Lysá nad Labem is located about 14 kilometres (9 mi) west of Nymburk and 20 km (12 mi) northeast of Prague. It lies mostly in the Central Elbe Table lowland within the Polabí region, only the northern part of the municipal territory extends into the Jizera Table. The highest point is the hill Šibák at 228 m (748 ft) above sea level. The town is situated on the right bank of the Elbe River.

North of the town proper is the Hrabanovská černava National Nature Monument. It has an area of 51.9 ha (128 acres). The monument consists of meadows and wetlands with populations of rare and endangered animals and plants. These include the flowering plant schoenus ferrugineus, which is critically endangered within the Czech Republic.

== History ==
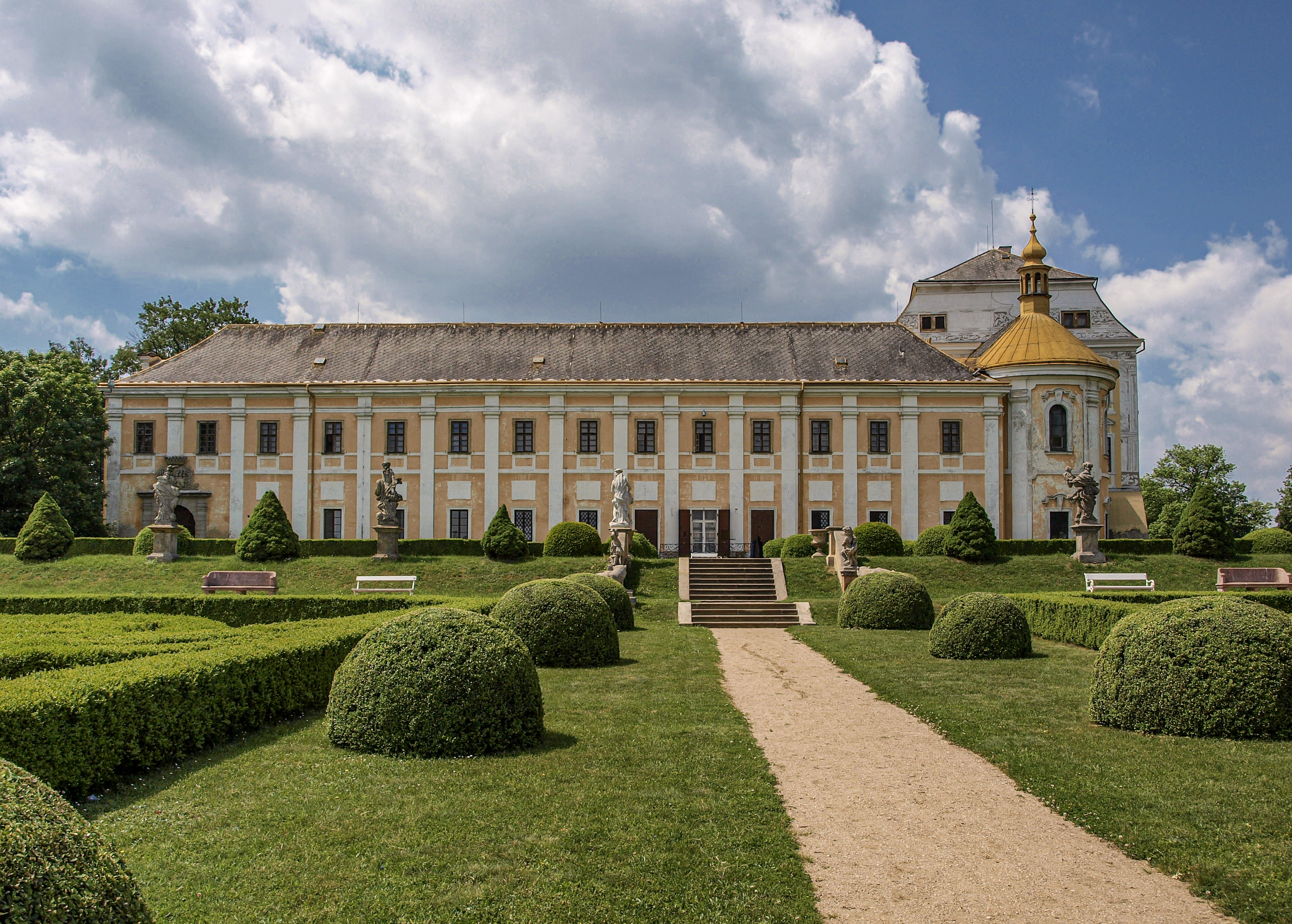
Lysá nad Labem Castle

The earliest known mention of Lysá nad Labem was in the Chronica Boemorum, related to the death of Oldřich, Duke of Bohemia in 1034. In the 13th century, a castle was built here. In 1291, Queen Judith of Habsburg issued a charter to unite the settlements of the Lysá estate into one economic unit. This led to the establishment of the centre of today's town, which was then called Nová Lysá ('new Lysá'), while the former settlement of Lysá began to be called Stará Lysá. From 1293, Lysá was referred to as a market town. Until the end of the 14th century, Lysá was a dowry town, ruled by the Bohemian queens.

During the Hussite Wars, Lysá was badly damaged and the local castle with the Augustinian monastery were destroyed. The Smiřický of Smiřice family bought Lysá in 1446 and owned it until 1529. At the turn of the 15th and 16th centuries, they had rebuilt the dilapidated castle into a late Gothic castle. In 1548, Emperor Ferdinand I added Lysá to the intimate dominion as a hunting centre. After a large fire, he had the castle rebuilt in the Renaissance style.

The development of the town was stopped by the Thirty Years' War. In 1647, Lysá was acquired by the empire general Johann von Sporck and then the town began to flourish. After the general's death, his son Franz Anton von Sporck began to reign. He made the most important changes in 1696 when the Augustinian monastery was restored and the new parish church and the Chapel of Three Kings were built.

In 1950, the municipality of Litol was merged with the town.

== Demographics ==
Historical population

Year	Pop.	±%
1869	4,177	—
1880	4,749	+13.7%
1890	4,663	−1.8%
1900	4,943	+6.0%
1910	5,376	+8.8%

Year	Pop.	±%
1921	5,977	+11.2%
1930	7,863	+31.6%
1950	7,907	+0.6%
1961	8,902	+12.6%
1970	9,811	+10.2%

Year	Pop.	±%
1980	9,113	−7.1%
1991	8,450	−7.3%
2001	8,208	−2.9%
2011	8,803	+7.2%
2021	9,859	+12.0%

Source: Censuses

== Transport ==
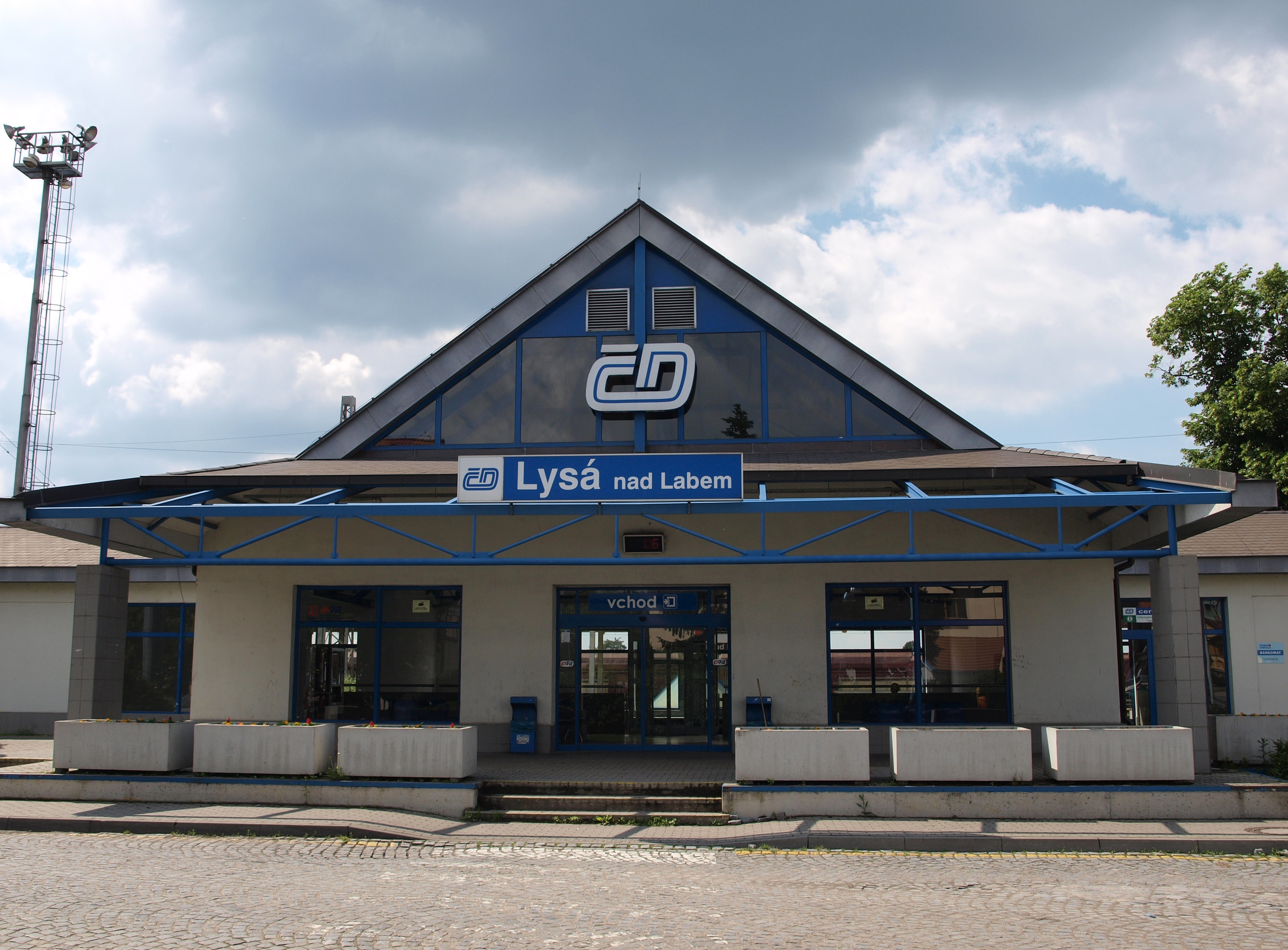
Lysá nad Labem railway station

Lysá nad Labem is a railway junction, located on the lines Prague–Milovice and Ústí nad Labem–Kolín.

== Culture ==
Lysá nad Labem is known for its horse racing course and its exhibition grounds, where many thematic exhibitions are held during the whole year. The exhibition grounds were opened in 1994. Exhibitions that have been regularly held annually in the town since the 1990s include Natura viva (an international festival of hunting, fishing and beekeeping), Zemědělec ('farmer'; agriculture, horticulture and food industry fair), Květy ('flowers'; a nationwide flower exhibition) and Kůň ('horse'; a horse fair).

== Sights ==
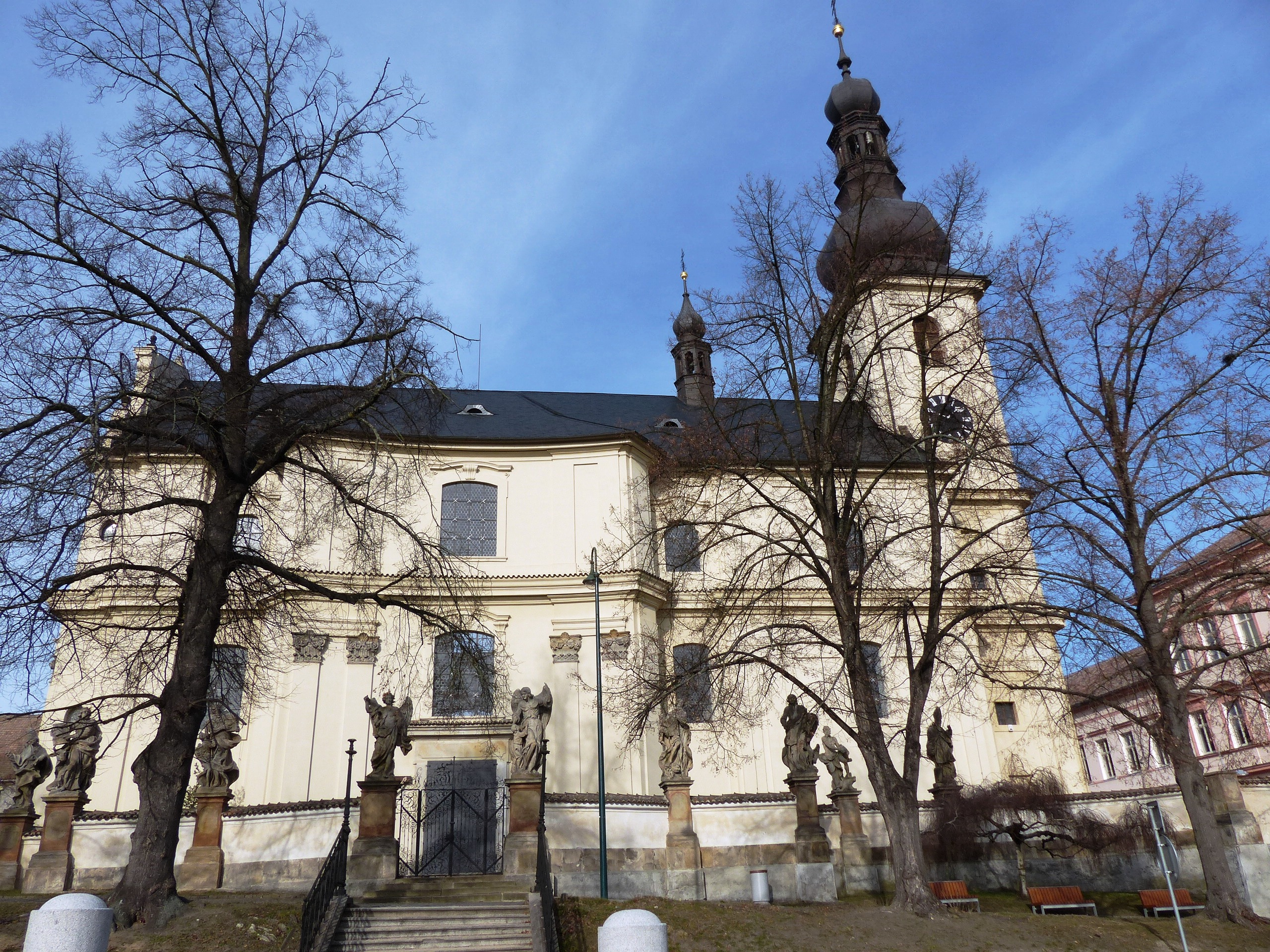
Church of Saint John the Baptist

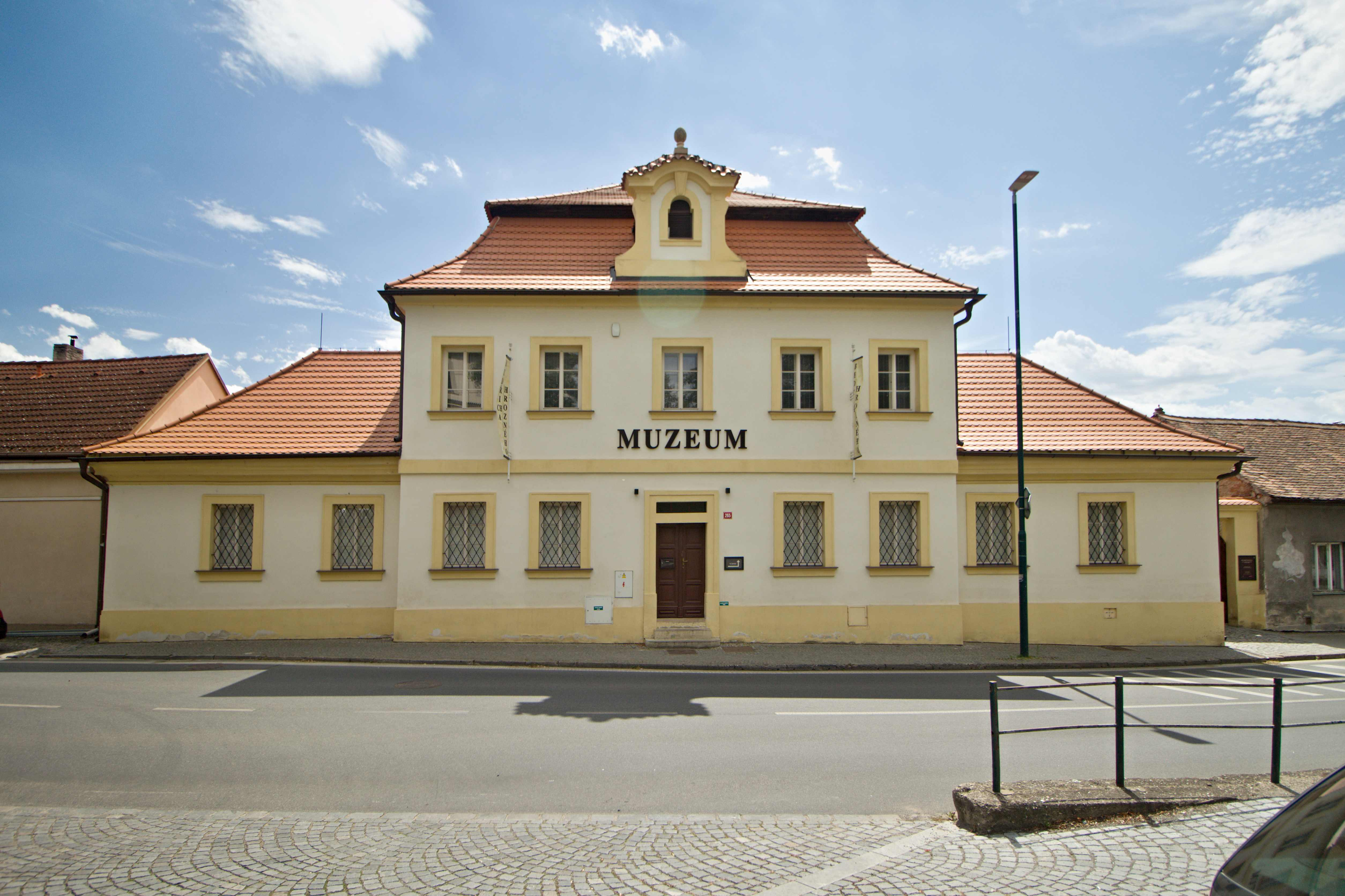
Bedřich Hrozný Museum

The historic town centre of Lysá nad Labem has been protected as an urban monument zone since 2003. The town has numerous Baroque monuments thanks to the reign of Count Franz Anton von Sporck, who invited many Baroque artists to Lysá nad Labem. He had rebuilt the castle in the Baroque style in the 17th and 18th centuries. The most famous of the artists was the sculptor Matthias Braun. Braun and his pupils sculpted dozens of statues for the town, many of which decorate the castle park. Nowadays, the castle serves as a retirement house, but the 21-hectare (52-acre) large castle park is open to the public.

The former Augustinian monastery is located next to the castle. It was built in the Baroque style in 1733–1739 and today houses the district archive.

The Church of Saint John the Baptist was built in the Baroque style in 1719–1741 and is considered an exceptionally valuable Baroque building. It was built according to the design by František Maxmilián Kaňka and the wall around the church was decorated with other sculptures made by Braun and his pupils. Neoclassical modifications of the church were made in 1774.

Baroque monuments in the town also include the Evangelical church. It was built in 1785–1789 and has valuable intact furnishings. Its rectory is the birthplace of Bedřich Hrozný.

Bedřich Hrozný Museum is located in a Baroque building, which is a cultural monument. The exhibition focuses on regional history and on the area of the ancient Near East and scientific activity of Bedřich Hrozný, who was a leading Orientalist and decipherer of the Hittite language.

== Notable people ==
- Franz Anton von Sporck (1662–1738), literatus and patron of the arts
- Bedřich Hrozný (1879–1952), Orientalist and linguist
- František Janouch (1931–2024), nuclear physicist

== Twin towns – sister cities ==
Lysá nad Labem is twinned with:

- Břeclav, Czech Republic
- Głogów Małopolski, Poland
- Kukeziv, Ukraine
