= Adriaan van Flodroff =

Dutch soldier

- Died: 1690; Battle of Fleurus (1690)
- Military career
- Allegiance: Netherlands
- Branch: Army
- Rank: Major General
- Conflicts: Nine Years War

Adriaan Gustaaf Count van Flodroff (also Flodorf or Flodorph, died 1690) was a Dutch soldier.

== Biography ==
He first joined the Dutch Army in 1671, and by 1683 had risen to become a Major General of cavalry. In 1689, following the outbreak of the Nine Years War, he was sent with a detachment to persuade Liège to abandon its neutrality and join the Grand Alliance, a mission which proved successful. The same year he took part in the Siege of Bonn. He was killed at the Battle of Fleurus in 1690.

== Bibliography ==
- Childs, John. The Nine Years' War and the British Army, 1688-97. Manchester University Press, 1991.
