= Siege of Bonn (1673) =

Siege during the Franco-Dutch War

Coordinates: 50.7300°N 7.1000°E

- Part of the Franco-Dutch War
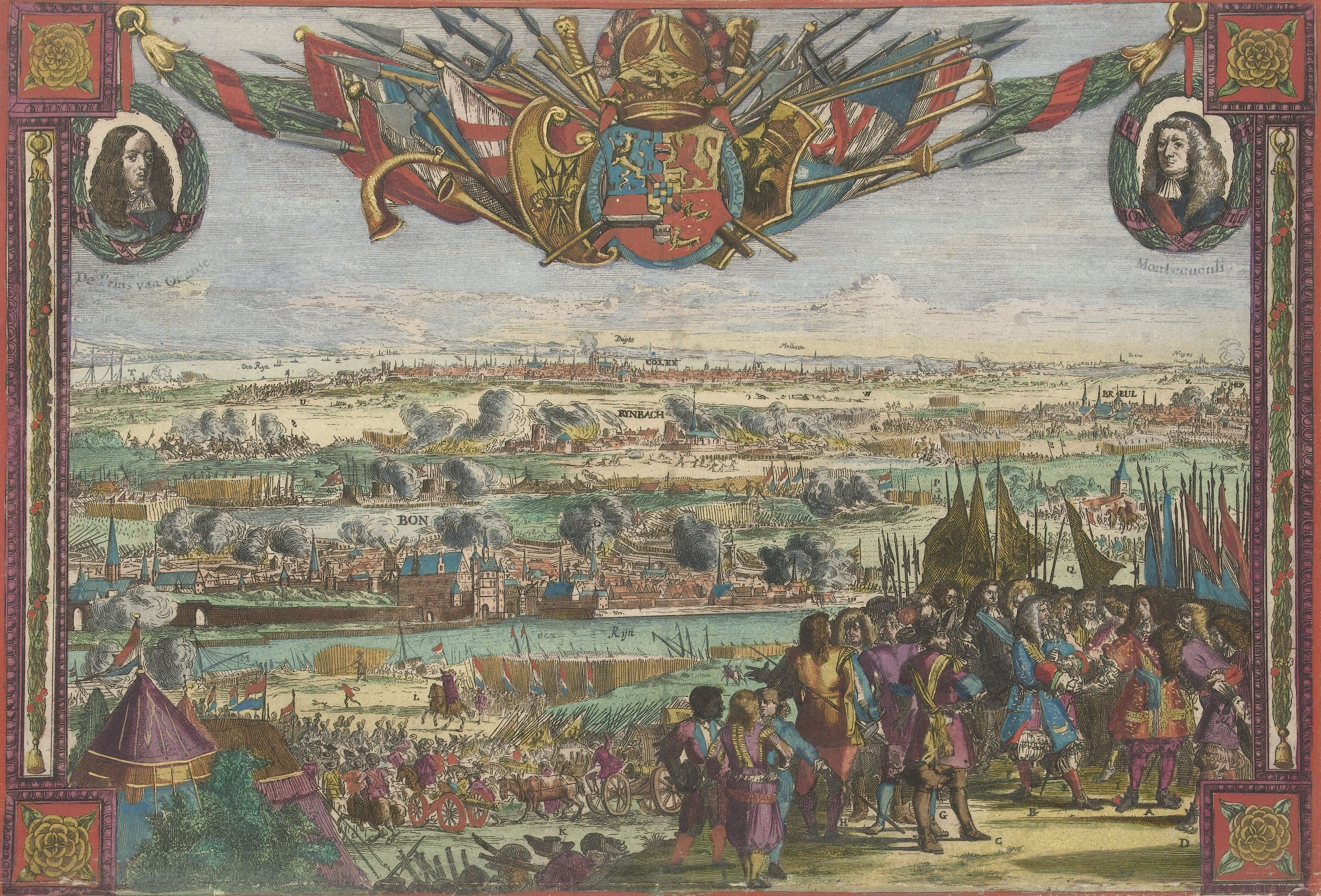
- Capture of Bonn, Rheinbach, Brühl, and other German towns. In the foreground, William III and Montecuccoli congratulate one another.
Date	3–12 November 1673
Location	near Bonn, present-day Germany
Result	Allied victory

Belligerents
Dutch Republic; Holy Roman Empire; Spain	France; Electorate of Cologne

Commanders and leaders
(Dutch Republic) William III (Spain) d'Assentar (Holy Roman Empire) Montecuccoli (Holy Roman Empire) Sporck	(Electorate of Cologne) Landsberg (Kingdom of France) Reveillon

Strength
48,000 men	2,000 men

Casualties and losses
400–500	400–500

The Siege of Bonn took place from 3 to 12 November 1673, during the Franco-Dutch War. Bonn, located in present-day Germany, was the residence of the Elector of Cologne and held by a garrison composed of troops from France and the Electorate of Cologne. The city was strategically significant due to its location on the Rhine and the capture of the city disrupted French lines of communication and logistics so much that they were forced to evacuate their troops in the Dutch Republic. The siege formed part of a broader Allied counteroffensive.

== Background ==
In 1672, Louis XIV invaded the Dutch Republic, initiating the Franco-Dutch War. By the end of the year, much of the Dutch Republic was occupied, and Dutch forces had withdrawn westward behind the Dutch Water Line, a series of inundated defences. In the north, Dutch troops fought a desperate campaign against Bernhard von Galen, the Prince-Bishop of Münster, who had joined the war on the French side. The Dutch Republic appeared to be on the brink of collapse.

At sea, however, Michiel de Ruyter successfully repelled the combined Anglo-French fleets in a series of battles at Solebay, Schooneveld, and Texel. These naval victories safeguarded vital sea lanes and prevented an invasion by sea, while the front on land gradually stabilised. By late 1673, under the leadership of Stadtholder William III of Orange, the Dutch had managed to rally both domestic support and foreign alliances. With the aid of the Holy Roman Empire and Spain, they launched a counteroffensive aimed at driving back French and allied forces.

In early September, the counteroffensive began. William III outmanoeuvred Marshal Luxembourg, who commanded the French forces along the Water Line, and captured the fortified town of Naarden. The fall of Naarden shocked the French high command, and Luxembourg reported to the French war minister Louvois that his position had become untenable. However, Louis was not yet willing to authorise the evacuation of French forces from the Dutch Republic.

== William III and Montecuccoli join forces ==
=== William III ===
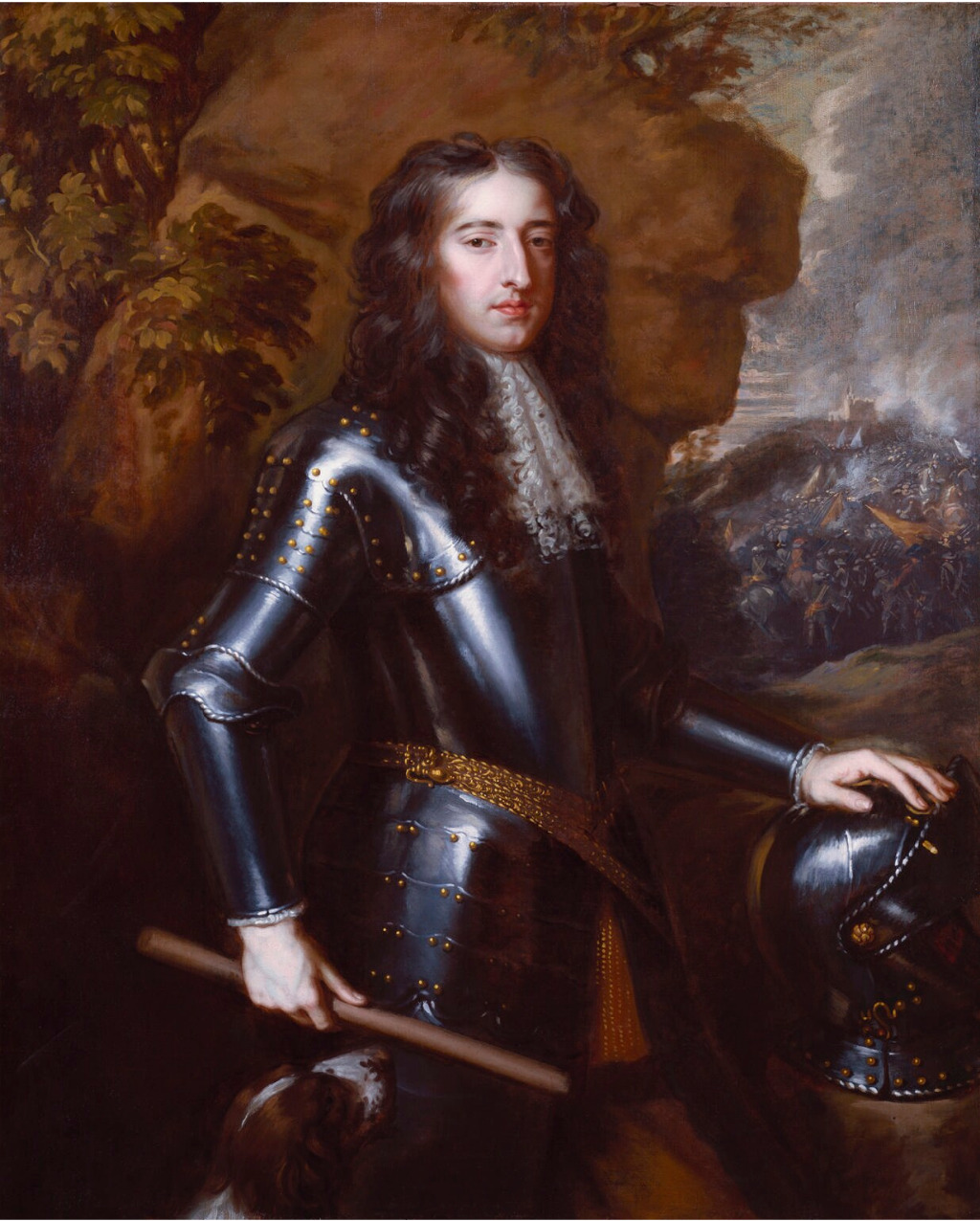
Portrait of William III from 1677.

As the Imperial army had not yet arrived in the area, several weeks passed without significant developments. However, in early October, William III advanced towards Germany with 10,000 Dutch and 15,000 Spanish troops, while Frederick von Waldeck remained behind with a large part of the Dutch army to defend the Water Line against Marshal Luxembourg. The allied army marched through the Campine region toward the Meuse River, crossing it near the Spanish controlled Venlo under the protection of its fortress, where supplies had been stockpiled.

As the Dutch army advanced through the lands of the Bishop of Cologne, soldiers looted and burned towns and villages in retaliation for the terrible devastation inflicted on the Dutch Republic the previous year. Bishop Maximilian Henry fled to Cologne, where unrest broke out among the population. However, the town of Rheinbach, which had been a Dutch fortress when the war started, declared its loyalty to him. When two Dutch officers were killed there by townspeople and Cologne troops, William ordered a punitive assault. On 2 November, the town was stormed and captured. All armed defenders were executed in order to deter further resistance. The mayor was hanged from the city gate, with the town keys around his neck and his sword still in hand.

Meanwhile, French commanders, including Condé and Marshal Luxembourg, attempted to respond. Condé, initially instructed to remain in the Spanish Netherlands, sent 9,000 troops under d'Humières in pursuit of William III. Luxembourg, who was close to William with just 8,000 troops, avoided direct engagement and positioned his forces defensively near Nijmegen.

=== Montecuccoli ===
Although the Imperial commander Raimondo Montecuccoli arrived in Germany in September, this did not result in a pitched battle. Instead, a series of manoeuvres ensued between Montecuccoli and Marshal Turenne, who had positioned his army along the Main. Both commanders engaged in strategic marches, feints, and the disruption of supply lines, avoiding direct confrontation. This style of warfare, considered refined at the time, was characterised by drawn-out operations with few decisive engagements.

By late October, Montecuccoli succeeded in crossing the Main with his army via a bridge near Frankfurt, then advanced towards the Rhine. In early November, he crossed the river at Koblenz, aided by the Electorate of Trier, whose ruler supported the Imperial cause. Using this route, Montecuccoli was able to unite with William III near Bonn between 3 and 7 November. Part of his army marched along the right bank of the Rhine to help complete the encirclement of the city, as the allies prepared to lay siege. Meanwhile, Turenne withdrew towards the Moselle, concerned that the Imperials might attempt an invasion of Alsace.

== The Siege ==
The decision by the allied commanders to besiege Bonn was considered strategically sound. Not only was there a reasonable expectation of taking the fortress, but its fall promised significant consequences. Its capture would provide the allies with a secure base on the Rhine, ensure continued coordination between the Imperial, Dutch and Spanish forces, and force the Elector of Cologne to abandon the French cause. Moreover, it threatened to sever French forces in the Dutch Republic from their home territory and potentially compel their withdrawal from the north.

At the time, Bonn was the principal residence of Maximilian Henry, the Archbishop-Elector of Cologne, but he had fled upon the approach of the enemy. The city was surrounded by relatively modern fortifications consisting of a regular bastioned trace with nine fronts, dry ditches, and ravelins. On the riverside, it was protected by a wall rather than a full bastioned line, and no fortified bridgehead existed yet on the eastern bank of the Rhine—such a structure would only be added later, during the siege of 1703.

Contemporary assessments of Bonn's defences differ. According to the French historian Beaurain, the fortifications were in poor repair, the magazines understocked, and the garrison consisted of around 1,200 French and 500–600 Cologne troops. Other sources suggest a stronger garrison of around 2,000 men and contradict Beaurain regarding the supplies, with some, such as De Quincy, claiming that Bonn was well provisioned and equipped with as many as 80 guns. The nominal commander was the Cologne general Landsberg, though effective authority rested with the French officer Réveillon, who had taken refuge in the city with two French regiments.

The allied army that arrived before Bonn was estimated at around 48,000 men. Including those Imperial forces left behind on the Moselle, the total strength of the allied forces on the Rhine likely reached 60,000. In contrast, the French had far fewer troops in the region, and these were dispersed. Luxembourg remained with 8,000 troops near Nijmegen, Turenne had only just reached Creuznach on 7 November, and d’Humières, though closer at Jülich, had only about 9,000 mostly cavalry.

The Spanish general d'Assentar advanced on Bonn with part of William III’s cavalry on 4 November and initiated the siege. The main allied forces arrived the following day and completed the encirclement. William III established his headquarters at Rheindorf to the north, d’Assentar at Kessenich, and Montecuccoli at the Godesberg. Allied troops on the right bank of the Rhine were commanded by General Johann von Sporck. A pontoon bridge was constructed downstream from the city to facilitate communication between both banks. Siege works commenced immediately, with two main approaches begun near the river—one by the Dutch in the north, the other by the Imperial troops in the south.

On 5 or 6 November, d’Humières attempted to reinforce the garrison by sending small cavalry detachments forward from Lechenich. One such detachment, led by Saint Silvestre, succeeded in infiltrating the Imperial lines at dawn, disguised as Lorraine troops, and entered Bonn. Other detachments were less fortunate and were either repulsed or captured. D’Humières, learning that large enemy cavalry forces were moving toward him, retreated to Neuss.

Despite sporadic artillery fire from the garrison, the siege progressed rapidly. Allied batteries opened fire on 8 November, reportedly causing substantial damage. Small sorties from the defenders were launched, including a notable raid on the night of 6–7 November that destroyed beacons guiding the Imperial trenches, causing temporary disarray. Nonetheless, the Dutch siege works advanced steadily toward the ravelin in front of the Cologne Gate. This ravelin, breached by artillery fire, was stormed on the night of 11 November by Dutch troops after heavy fighting and notable casualties.

Following the capture of the ravelin, allied forces prepared for a general assault. Sappers began mining operations under the main wall and fascines were gathered for crossing the ditch. Both Dutch and Imperial forces were now in position for a final assault. Réveillon continued preparations for defence, but morale within the garrison collapsed. The Cologne officers and the townspeople refused to continue resistance and even turned against the French commander. Negotiations began on 12 November and the city surrendered the following day. The garrison was allowed to withdraw to Neuss.

Casualties during the siege were reportedly around 400–500 men on each side. Although the French elements of the garrison fought resolutely, their efforts were ultimately undermined by the lack of support from their Cologne allies and the discontent of the local population, as well as by the determined and well-organised allied assault.

== Aftermath ==
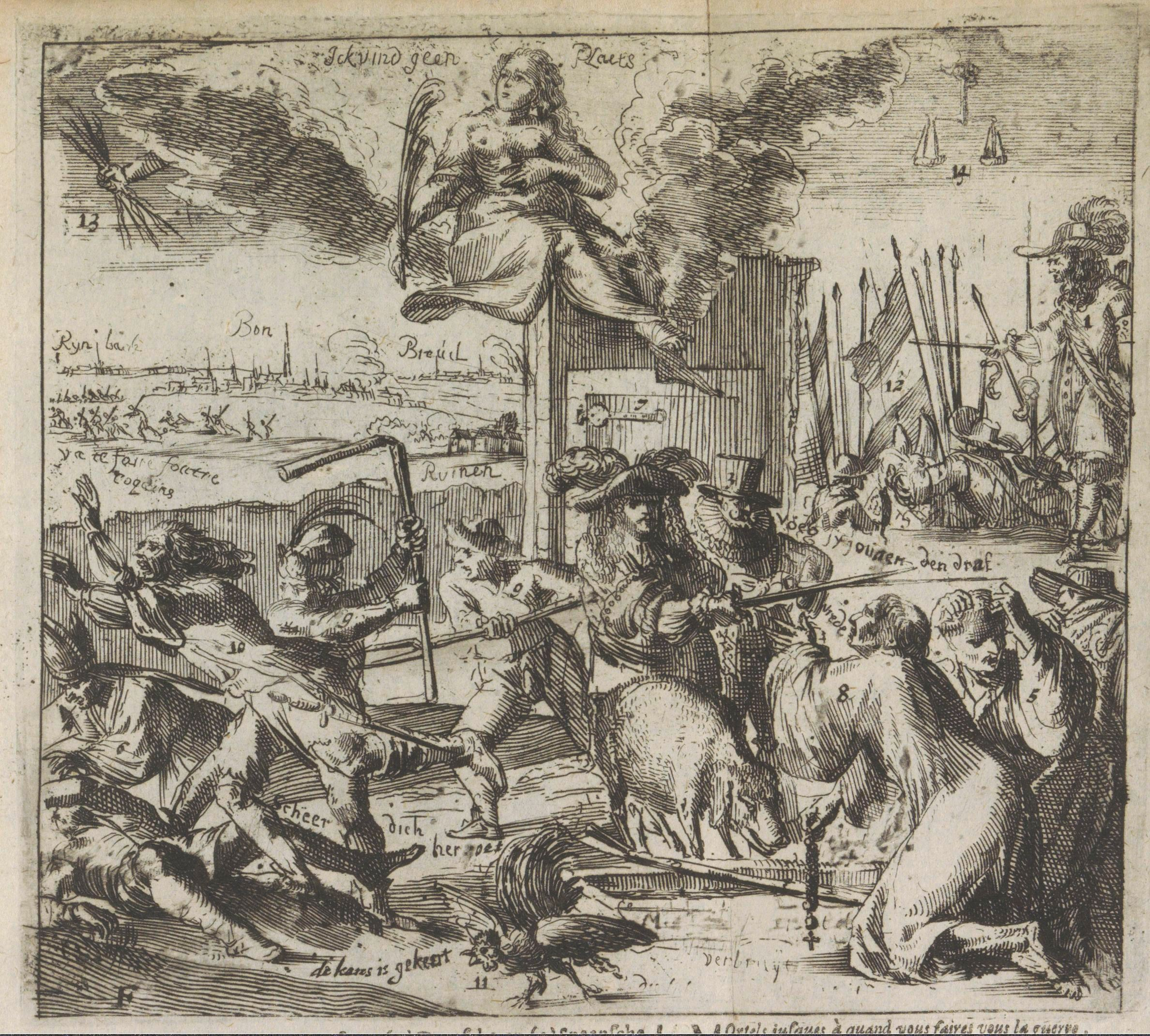
Satirical print titled: Holland's Answer to the French Satire "The Frenchman and the Dutchman", 1673. Through the combined efforts of the Netherlands, Germany, and Spain, the French and English are defeated. On the right stands Prince William III; in the foreground, the bishops plead for mercy. In the sky, Peace searches in vain for a place on earth. In the background, a reference to the capture of the towns of Bonn, Rheinbach, and Brühl in 1673. With captions in Dutch and French.

With the season too far advanced for further campaigning, the capture of Bonn in November 1673 marked the effective end of the year's military operations. Dutch and allied forces seized several minor fortresses in the Electorate of Cologne and the Duchy of Jülich, including Brühl, Lechenich, Kerpen, and Düren. Although these actions were relatively minor, they underlined the weakening French position on the Rhine. Following these operations, the allied armies went into winter quarters. The Imperial forces camped near Bonn and along the eastern bank of the Rhine, while William III withdrew with the Dutch and Spanish troops to the Meuse. Turenne moved into Lorraine and Alsace, and d’Humières returned to the Dutch Republic to reinforce Luxembourg.

The loss of most of his territory forced the Archbishop-Elector of Cologne to abandon the French alliance, and the Bishop of Münster soon followed. Although peace treaties with both were only signed in spring 1674, they were direct results of the November campaign. These diplomatic gains further stabilised the Dutch position after the crisis of 1672. More significantly, the fall of Bonn compelled Louis XIV to evacuate his remaining troops from the Dutch Republic. French forces began withdrawing in November, abandoning key cities in Utrecht, Gelderland, and Overijssel, while the forces of Münster left Meppel and Steenwijk. Only Grave and Maastricht remained in French hands, with their garrisons reinforced.

As Luxembourg retreated toward France with a large baggage train, William III attempted to intercept him. Though the French general avoided battle—retreating twice back to Maastricht—his movements were severely constrained. William eventually broke off the pursuit due to worsening weather, troop exhaustion, and reports of French reinforcements near the Sambre. In January 1674, Luxembourg finally withdrew via Charleroi, joined by cavalry under Schomberg. Meanwhile, a second French corps under Marshal de Bellefonds, composed of 22,000 men from recently evacuated towns, gathered at Maastricht and did not leave until May. In total, the French had deployed around 50,000 troops on Dutch soil at the time of Bonn's fall, but by early 1674 the Republic had regained almost all lost territory.

Bonn would again become a battleground in later conflicts, with notable sieges occurring in 1689 during the Nine Years' War and in 1703 during the War of the Spanish Succession.
