= Siege of Weißenburg in Bayern =

1647 siege of the Thirty Years' War

- Part of the Thirty Years' War
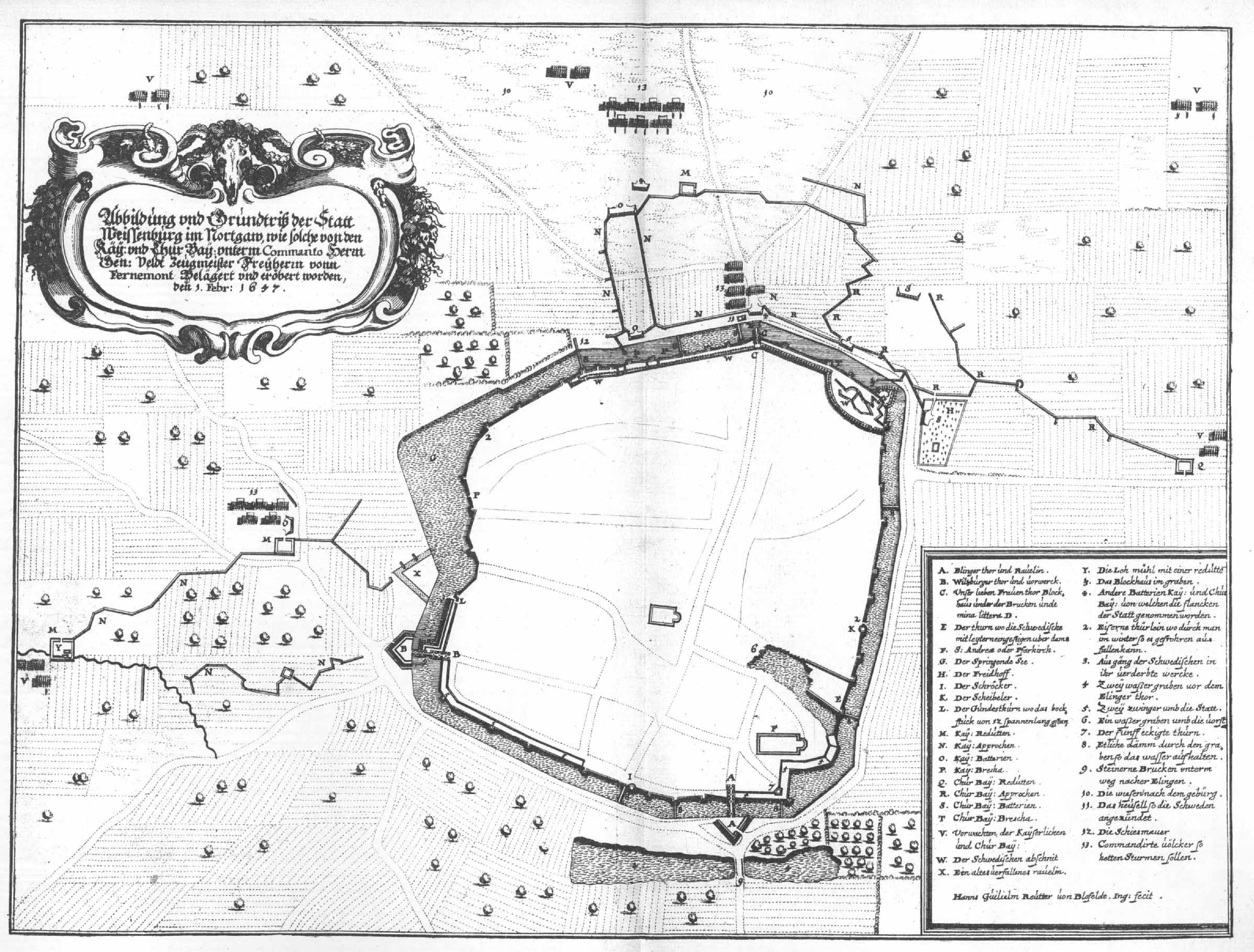
- Engaging of Weißenburg in Bayern by Matthias Merian, 1647
Date	3rd – 23rd January (Note: From the Theatrum Europaeum) or February 1st or 2nd, 1647
Location	Weißenburg in Bayern, Holy Roman Empire
Result	Imperial-Bavarian victory

Belligerents
(yes) Swedish Empire	Bavaria; Holy Roman Empire

Commanders and leaders
(Swedish Empire) Adam von Weyher	(Electorate of Bavaria) Georg von Holtz (Electorate of Bavaria) Johann von Werth (Electorate of Bavaria) Johann von Sporck (WIA) (Holy Roman Empire) Georg von Traudisch (Holy Roman Empire) Freiherr von Fernemont (Holy Roman Empire) Adrian von Enkevort

Units involved
(Swedish Empire) Weißenburg Garrison	(Holy Roman Empire) Regiment Fernemont (Holy Roman Empire) Regiment Enckevort (Electorate of Bavaria) Reuschenberg Regiment (Electorate of Bavaria) Holtz Regiment (Electorate of Bavaria) Winterscheidt Regiment (Electorate of Bavaria) Fugger Regiment (Electorate of Bavaria) Cobb Regiment (Electorate of Bavaria) Puech Regiment (Electorate of Bavaria) Marimont Regiment (Electorate of Bavaria) Luilsdorf Regiment (Electorate of Bavaria) Merch Regiment (Electorate of Bavaria) Elter Regiment

Strength
Unknown	(Electorate of Bavaria) (Holy Roman Empire) 6,000

Casualties and losses
Unknown	(Electorate of Bavaria) Over 470 Killed and Wounded

The Siege of Weißenburg in Bayern was a siege of the Swedish occupied city of Weißenburg in Bayern by a combined Imperial-Bavarian army under Johann Franz von Barwitz, Freiherr von Fernemont. The siege ended in an Imperial-Bavarian victory, the dates of the sieges are conflicted, with alternate dates of surrender, including January 23rd, February 1st and 2nd.

== Background ==
On November 4th, 1646, Lieutenant Colonel Adam von Weyher, of the Gründlisch Regiment, and Colonel Kaspar von Polley, of the Poleyian Regiment, captured the Franconian city of Weißenburg in Bayern. Polley remained as governor of the city, but was replaced by Weyher.

When the Swedes besieged Lindau in January, Imperial General Johann Franz von Barwitz, Freiherr von Fernemont was sent to relieve tension on the city.

== Siege ==
On January 3rd, an advanced guard of 300 cavalry established a blockade of Weißenburg in Bayern. On the 8th, a Imperial-Bavarian army of 6,000 under Georg von Holtz, Johann von Werth, Johann von Sporck, Georg Adam von Traudisch, Freiherr von Fernemont, and Adrian von Enkevort established a proper siege of the town. An artillery bombardment was launched immediately, so that from the 9th to the 16th of January, a total of 5,700 shots were fired.

On the 19th, Fernemont attempted to storm the town, but this attack failed, taking heavy casualties. On the 28th, breaches were made in the wall and an attack was launched. 2 sergeant majors, 4 captains, including Lieutenant Colonel Hildebrandt, and a total of 200 men were killed. During another assault 227 men were wounded with another 42 killed.

Through mediation by Georg Wilhelm von Eckertshausen reached an agreement about the Swedish surrender. In the agreement, the garrison received safe passage with full military honors and was escorted as far as Wemding.

== Aftermath ==
Ultimately the siege was successful, but a month later the Elector of Bavaria signed a truce with the Swedes and French. Weißenburg would remain under Bavarian control until the end of the war.

== Sources ==
- Heilmann, Johann (1868). Kriegsgeschichte von Bayern, Franken, Pfalz und Schwaben von 1506 bis 1651. Munich.
- Warlich, Bernd (2021). Enckevort (Enckfurth, Enckefurt, Enquenfort, Enkevörn), Adrian von. In: Der Dreißigjährige Krieg in Selbstzeugnissen, Chroniken und Berichten.
- Warlich, Bernd (2021). Polley (Poley, Polley, Pollay, Paley, Poleg, Boulay), Caspar von.In: Der Dreißigjährige Krieg in Selbstzeugnissen, Chroniken und Berichten.
- Wilson, Peter H. (2009). Europe's Tragedy: A History of the Thirty Years War. Allen Lane. ISBN 978-0-7139-9592-3.
- Holtz, Maximillian Gottfried Friedrich (1891). Generalfeldzeugmeister Georg Friedrich vom Holtz auf Alfdorf, Hohenmühringen, Aichelberg.
