= Johann von Sporck =

German nobleman and General of the cavalry (1595–1679)

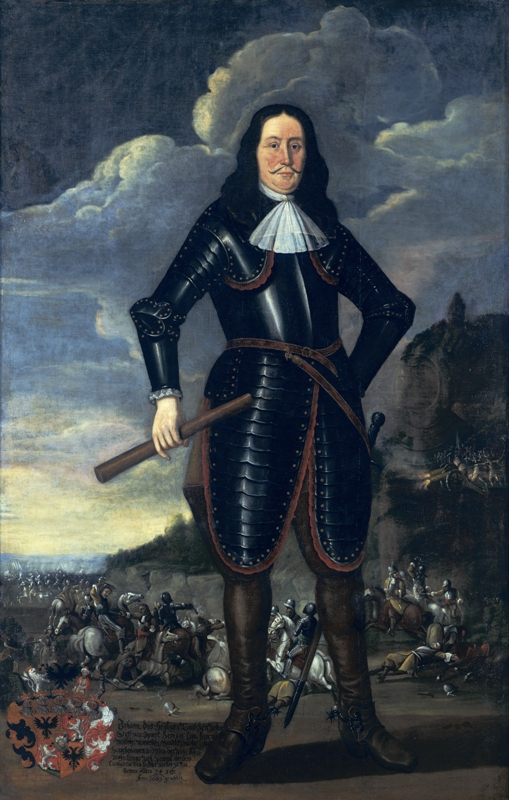
- Johann von Sporck
- Born: 1595; Sporckhof, Holy Roman Empire
- Died: 6 August 1679 (aged 83–84) Heřmanův Městec, Holy Roman Empire (Kingdom of Bohemia)
- Allegiance: Electorate of Bavaria; Holy Roman Empire
- Service years: 1620 – 1676
- Rank: General of the cavalry (Austria)
- Conflicts: Thirty Years' War: Battle of White Mountain; Hessian War; Battle of Jankau; Siege of Weißenburg in Bayern; Second Northern War; Austro-Turkish War (1663–64): Battle of Saint Gotthard (1664); Franco-Dutch War: Siege of Bonn (1673)

Johann von Sporck (1595 – 6 August 1679) was a German nobleman and General of the cavalry. Sporck was born in 1595 and he began his military career at the start of the Thirty Years' War as a private. His personal bravery and mastery of cavalry tactics led to his steady advancement through the ranks as well as his ennoblement. He later fought in the Second Northern War, the Austro-Turkish War (1663–64) and the Franco-Dutch War. He retired in 1676, having received the rank of General of the cavalry and accumulating great riches. He died three years later. His son Franz Anton von Sporck became a publisher and a patron of arts.

== Biography ==
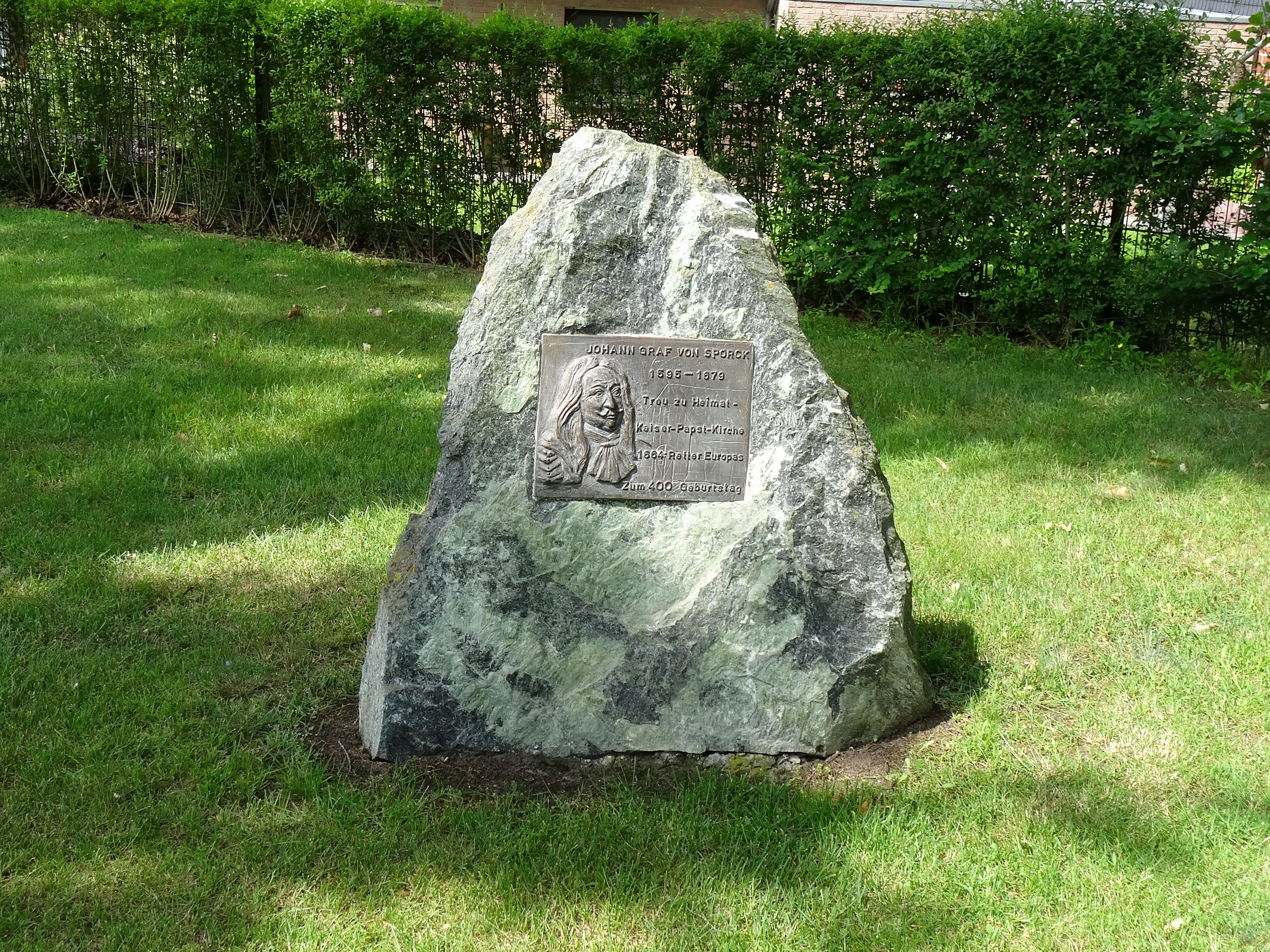
Plaque commemorating the 400th anniversary of Sporck's birth, Delbrück

Sporck was born in 1595 in Sporckhof located in the Prince-Bishopric of Paderborn, on a farm belonging to his father Franz (died in 1625). Little is known about his early life, however letters written by him indicate that he was well educated. Sporck was baptized as Lutheran, however he later adopted Catholicism due to the contemporary recatholicization campaign launched by Dietrich IV, Bishop of Paderborn. He had three brothers. His younger brother Philip worked at the court of Padeborn's prince-bishop, and his two older brothers served in the military of the Electorate of Bavaria, one of them in the rank of rittmeister (cavalry captain). Sporck entered the Bavarian military in 1620. According to his comrade in arms future general Chavagnac, he initially served as a drummer while other accounts claim he was a cavalryman. He fought side by side with his brother in the Battle of White Mountain an early action of the Thirty Years' War where the latter was killed.

Sporck reached the rank of rittmeister in 1633, while serving under Johann von Werth. In 1636 he distinguished himself in battle. In 1639, he took part in the Hessian campaign against the Landgraviate of Hesse-Darmstadt, where was promoted to colonel. On 29 March 1640, he was thanked by Maximilian I, Elector of Bavaria for recruiting two companies of arquebusiers, ordering him to recruit five more. The riders were recruited in the Upper Palatinate by July, forming Sporck's personal regiment. In November 1643, Sporck's regiment made a daring raid on the French troops stationed in the vicinity of Tuttlingen. In March 1645, Sporck distinguished himself in the Battle of Jankau, however he was seriously wounded and was seized as a prisoner of war by the Swedes. Upon his release in 1646, Maximilian I granted him the rank of generalwachtmeister. On 14 March 1647, Bavaria signed a truce with Sweden and France.

This angered a party of officers led by Werth, who launched a mutiny in an attempt to bring Bavaria back into the war, Sporck was among those who joined Werth. Bavaria renounced the truce on 7 September, after the emperor granted Maximilian large monetary concessions and military autonomy. Werth and Sporck had angered Maximilian to such an extent that their return into Bavarian service was deemed impossible, they therefore joined the Imperial army. On 12 October 1647, emperor Ferdinand III promoted him to lieutenant field marshal, enfeoffing him with the lordship of Lysá nad Labem and giving the noble title of Reichsfreiherrn (free lord). He spent the rest of the war fighting against the Franco–Swedes in Bavaria and against the latter in Bohemia. He spent the following years maintaining his vast estates.

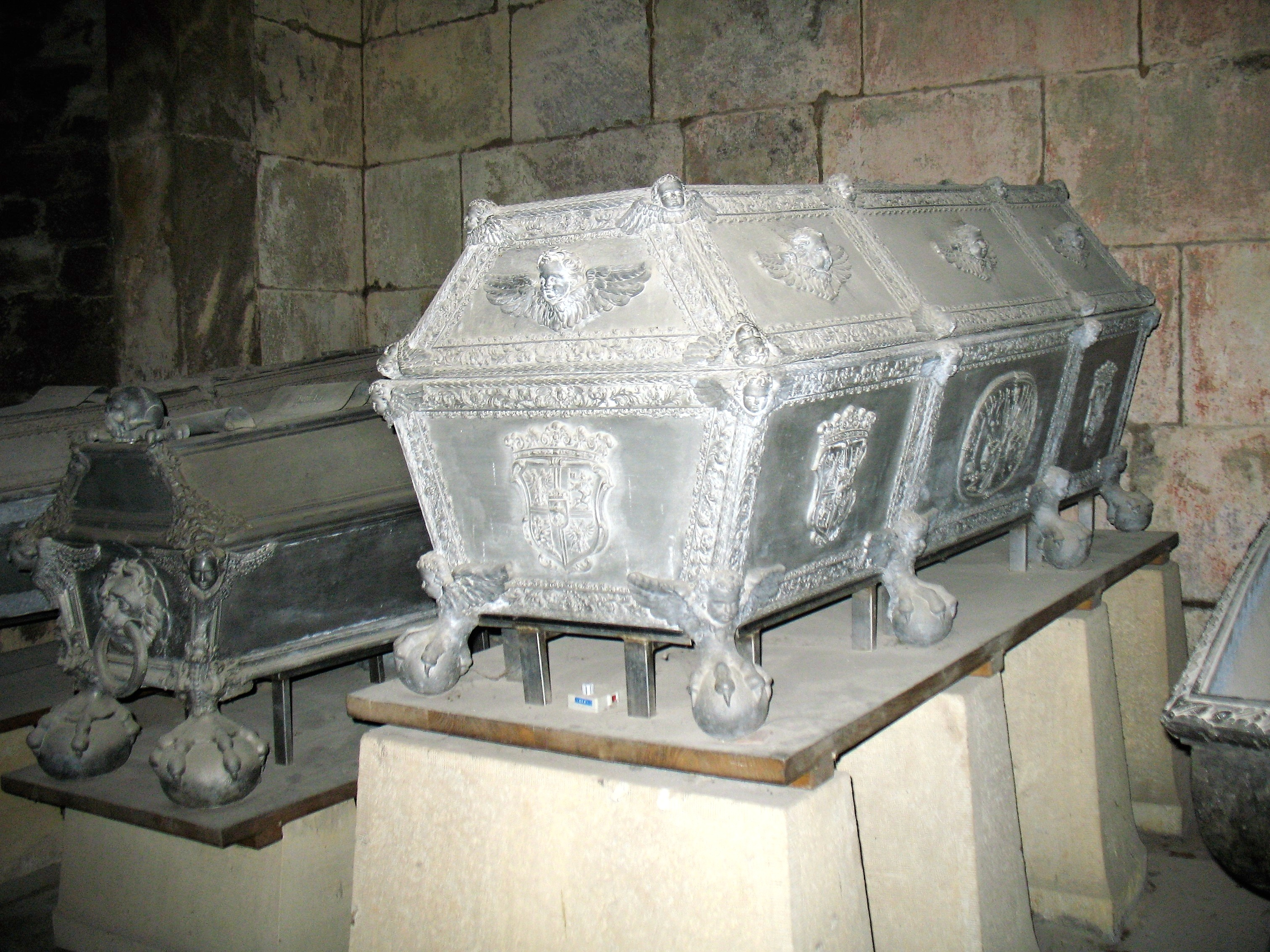
Coffin of count Johann von Sporck in the family tomb in Kuks

In 1657, he rejoined the Imperial troops fighting in the Second Northern War, campaigning extensively in Poland, Prussia, Schleswig, Jutland and Pomerania. In 1661, he took part in a failed military expedition against the Turks in Transylvania. The 1663 Turkish invasion of Imperial Hungary sparked the Austro-Turkish War (1663–1664). The charge conducted by his cavalrymen at the Battle of Saint Gotthard (1664) on 6 August, gained the praise of the emperor Leopold I who assigned him the command of the sum of the Imperial cavalry and made him an Imperial Count. Six years later he was promoted to generalfeldmarschall and sent to Hungary, where he suppressed an uprising organized by the Hungarian magnates. He returned to Hungary in 1672, where he headed the bloody pacification of areas which were previously overtaken by bandits.

In the meantime the empire had become embroidered in the Franco-Dutch War. In the summer of 1673, troops under the command of Sporck and Raimondo Montecuccoli marched to the Rhine where they besieged Bonn, repelling a relief attempt by French marshal Turenne. After wintering in Westphalia, he participated in the 1674 campaign in Belgium, taking Dinant, Chimay and Huy. In April 1675, he returned to the Upper Rhine and united his army with that of Montecuccoli. He retired in February 1676 due to old age. Sporck died in his Bohemian castle Hermanmester on 6 August 1679. Chavangac describes him as a master of light cavalry tactics, whose personal bravery led to the creation of exaggerated tales about his exploits. By the end of his life he had accumulated estates worth of 3 million thalers and had an annual income of 50,000 more.

== Family ==
In 1639, he married Freifrau Anna Margaretha von Linsingen who owned estates in Lower Hesse; their marriage produced one daughter, his first wife and child had died by 1657. In 1660, he married Freifrau Eleonore Marie Katharine von Fineck whom he had met during his campaigns in the Second Northern War. Their eldest son Franz Anton von Sporck (died in 1738) was a publisher of christian devotional literature and a patron of fine arts, while his younger son continued his family's line of von Sporck. Sporck had also brought his younger brother's sons to Austria where he endowed them with money and bestowed upon them the Freiherr title of nobility.
