= Stará Lysá =

- Municipality
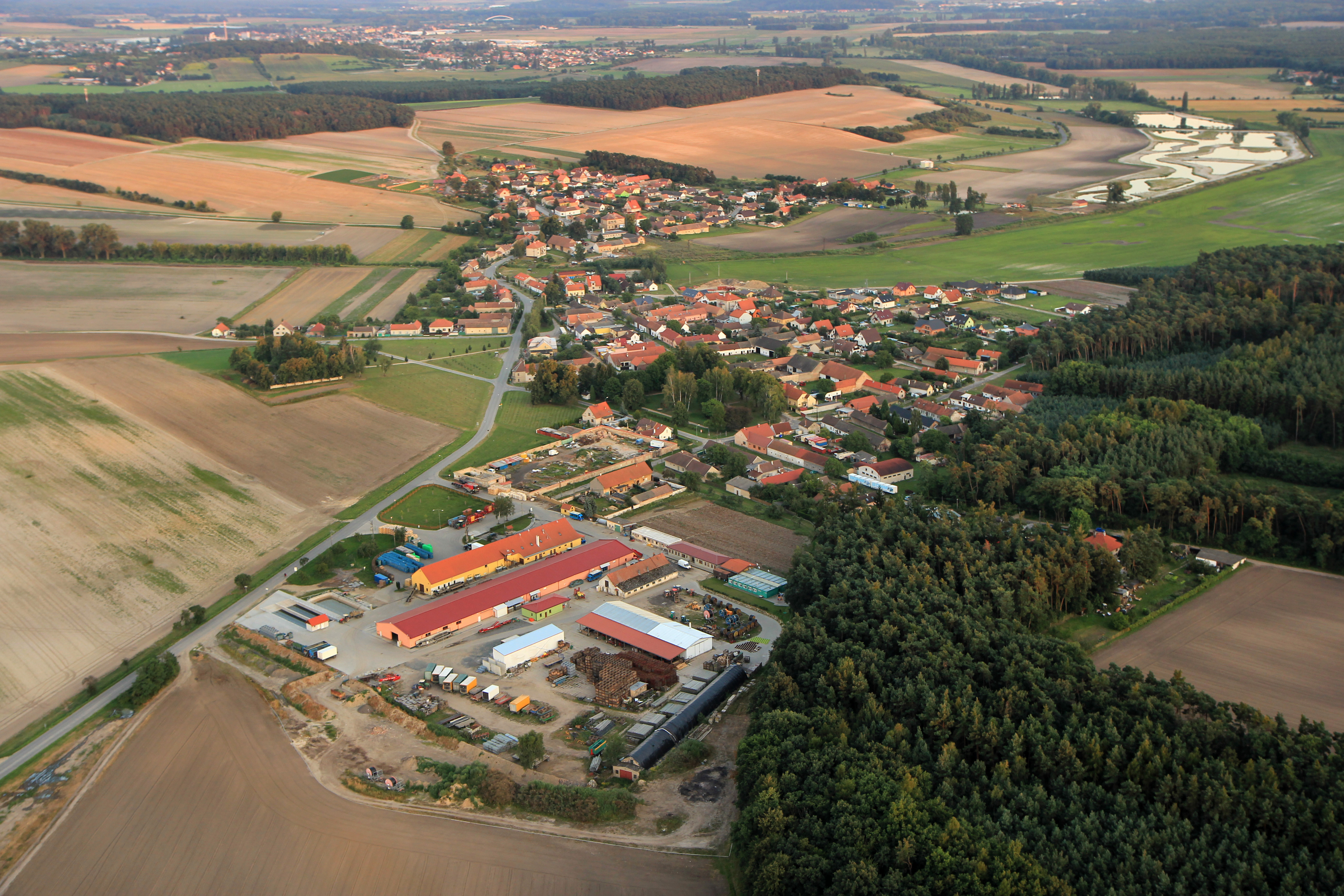
- Aerial view

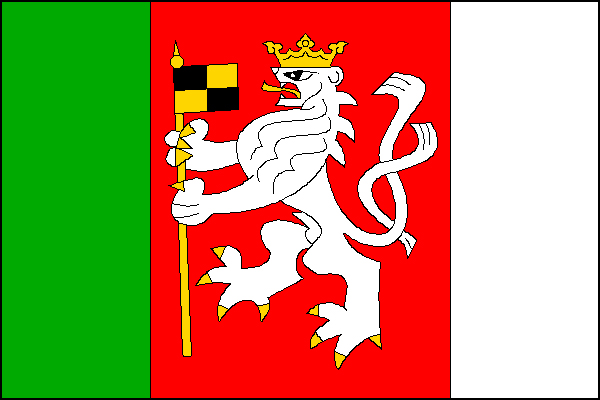
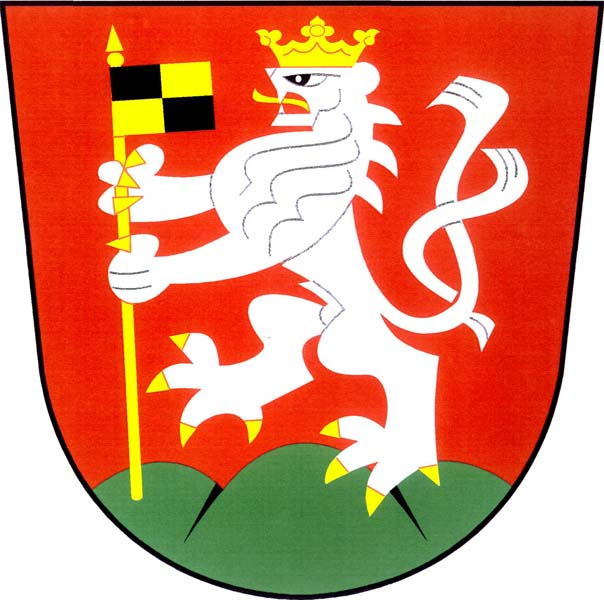
- Flag Coat of arms

- Location in the Czech Republic
- Coordinates: 50°13′29″N 14°47′57″E
- Country: Czech Republic
- Region: Central Bohemian
- District: Nymburk
- First mentioned: 1013

Area
  - Total: 9.69 km^{2} (3.74 sq mi)
- Elevation: 190 m (620 ft)

Population (2026-01-01)
  - Total: 890
  - Density: 92/km^{2} (240/sq mi)
- Time zone: UTC+1 (CET)
  - Summer (DST): UTC+2 (CEST)
- Postal code: 289 26
- Website: www.staralysa.cz

Stará Lysá is a municipality and village in Nymburk District in the Central Bohemian Region of the Czech Republic. It has about 900 inhabitants.

== Administrative division ==
Stará Lysá consists of two municipal parts (in brackets population according to the 2021 census):

- Stará Lysá (755)
- Čihadla (72)

== History ==
The first written mention of Stará Lysá is from 1013.

== Demographics ==
Historical population
Year	Pop.	±%
1869	604	—
1880	620	+2.6%
1890	685	+10.5%
1900	705	+2.9%
1910	748	+6.1%
1921	760	+1.6%
1930	778	+2.4%
1950	634	−18.5%
1961	623	−1.7%
1970	533	−14.4%
1980	465	−12.8%
1991	413	−11.2%
2001	474	+14.8%
2011	647	+36.5%
2021	827	+27.8%
Source: Censuses
