= Siege of Bonn (1703) =

- Part of the War of the Spanish Succession
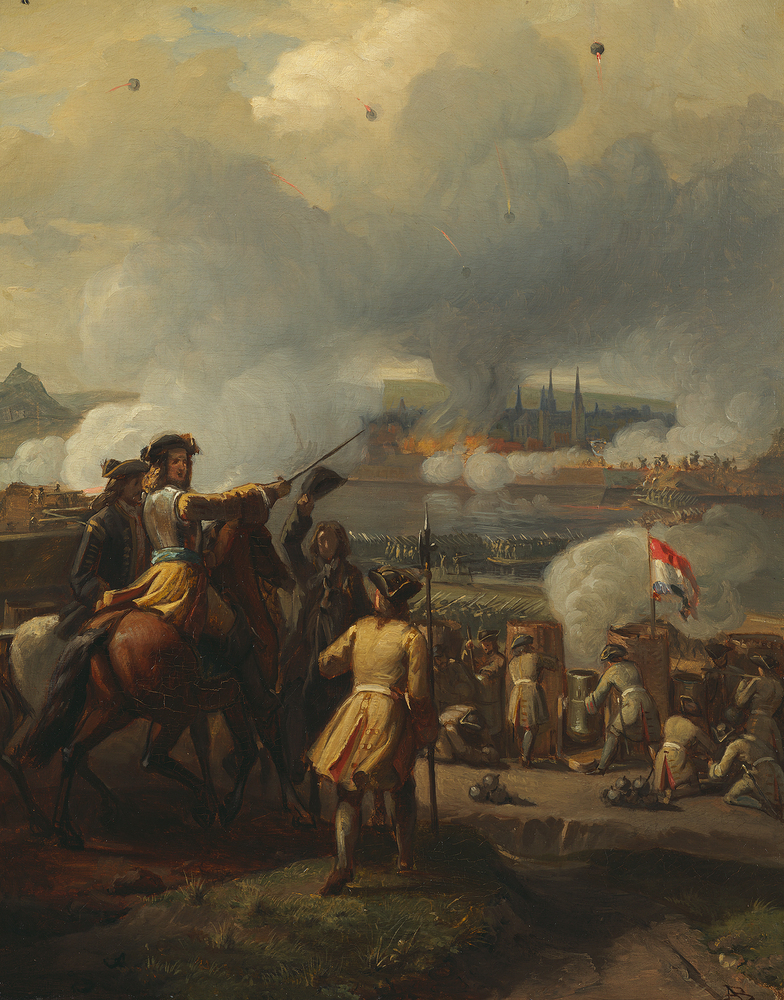
- Coehoorn at the Siege of Bonn
Date	24 April 1703 – 15 May 1703
Location	Bonn
Result	Allied victory

Belligerents
Kingdom of France; Spain; Cologne	Holy Roman Empire; Dutch Republic

Commanders and leaders
Yves d'Alègre	(Dutch Republic) Menno van Coehoorn (Dutch Republic) Prince of Hesse (Dutch Republic) François Nicolas Fagel

Strength
10 infantry battalions (3,600 men)	40 infantry battalions 60 squadrons of cavalry

Casualties and losses
Unknown	Unknown

The siege of Bonn took place in 1703 during the War of the Spanish Succession when an Allied force laid siege to and forced the surrender of the French garrison of the city of Bonn. The Allied forces were part of a general field army commanded by John Churchill, 1st Duke of Marlborough. The siege was portrayed in a contemporaneous painting by Alexander van Gaelen.

It was the third siege of the city in thirty years, previous actions having taken place in 1673 and 1689.

== Gallery ==
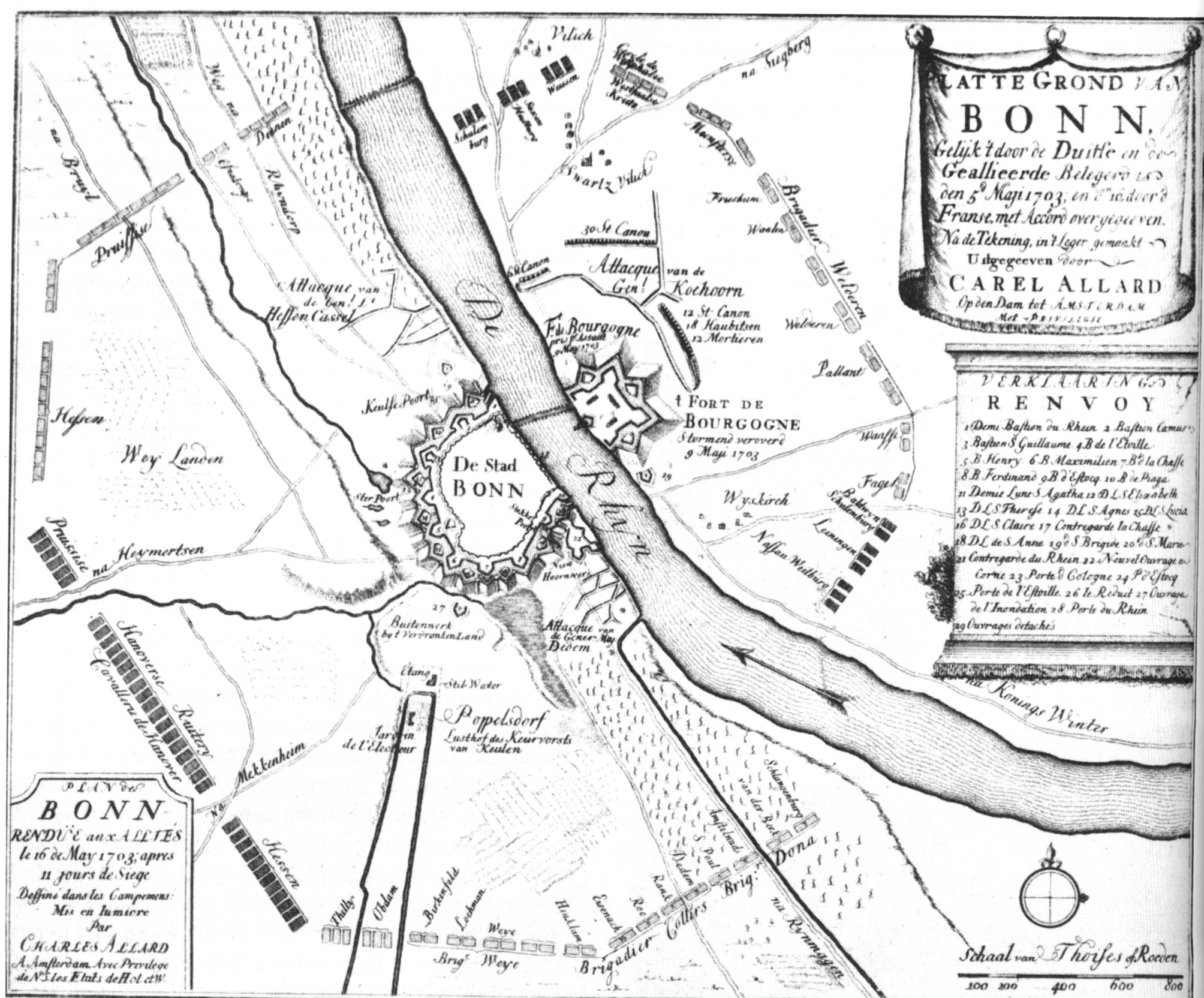

== Bibliography ==
- Holmes, Richard. Marlborough: England's Fragile Genius. Harper Press, 2008.
