= Siege of Bonn (1689) =

1689 battle of the Nine Years' War

- Part of Nine Years' War
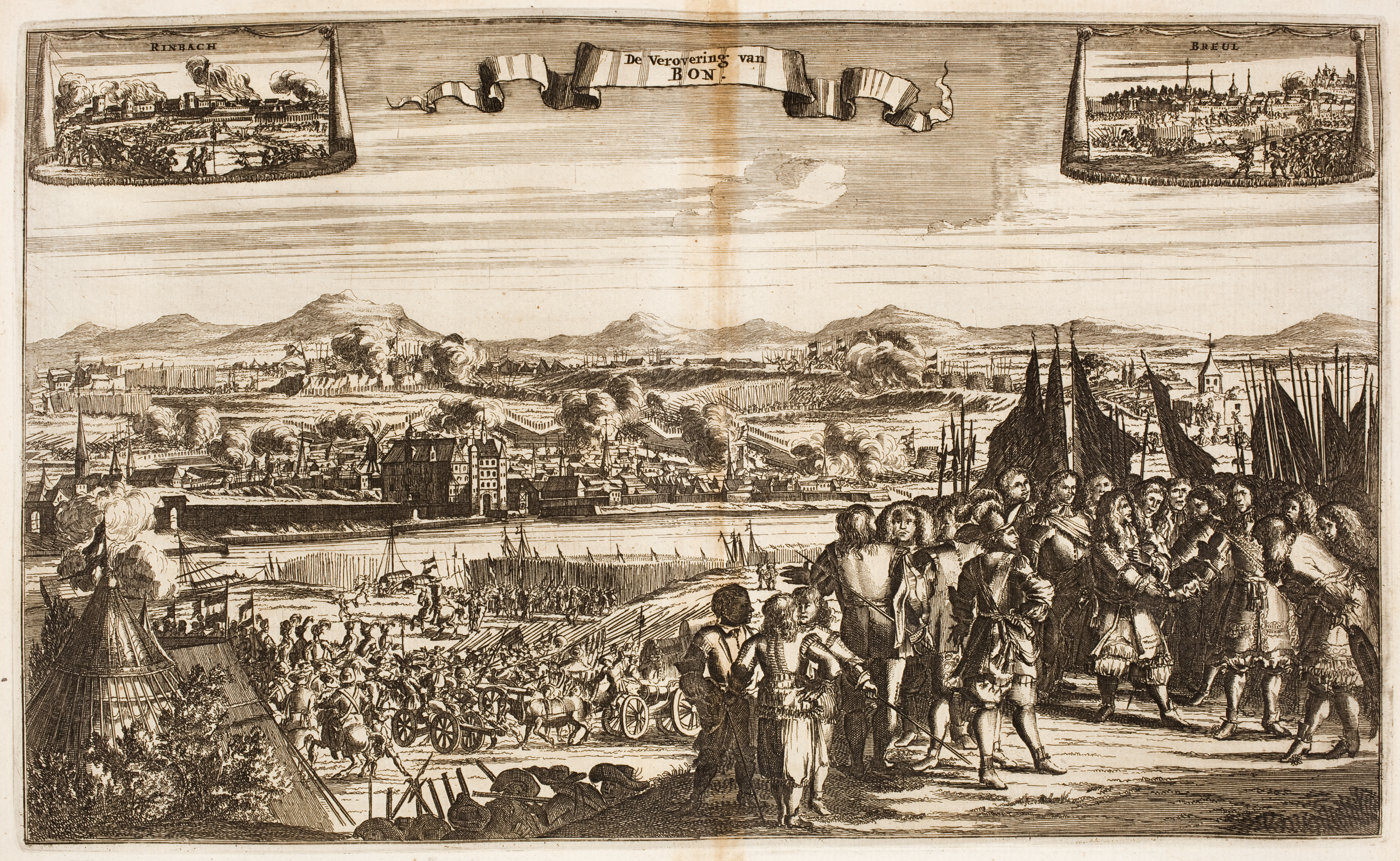
Date	Investment: July 1689 – 12 October 1689; Siege: 16 September – 12 October 1689 (3 weeks and 5 days)
Location	Bonn, Electorate of Cologne, Holy Roman Empire
Result	Allied victory
Territorial changes	Allied capture of Bonn

Belligerents
Brandenburg; Dutch Republic	France (Electorate of Cologne) Cologne

Commanders and leaders
Frederick III; Hans Adam von Schöning (Dutch Republic) Adriaan van Flodroff	(Kingdom of France) Alexis Bidal Marquis d'Asfeld (DOW)

Strength
30,000; 100 guns 46 mortars 4 howitzers	8,000

Casualties and losses
4,000	6,500 killed, wounded and sick

The siege of Bonn took place in 1689 during the Nine Years' War when the forces of Brandenburg-Prussia and the Dutch Republic besieged and captured Bonn. It was part of the Rhineland campaign which Brandenburg was fighting as part of the Grand Alliance against Louis XIV of France. Following Louis' incursions into the Rhineland the previous year, a coalition of nations had formed to resist French hegemony.

In Germany this involved an advance into the territory of France's ally the Electorate of Cologne, while to the west the large field armies of Waldeck and Humières were manoeuvring against each other. Waldeck, the overall commander of the Allied forces, was wary of taking any offensive action against the French until he received reinforcements from Rhineland, but the Brandenburg forces concentrated on their own operations in Cologne. In June 1689 Brandenburg took Kaiserswerth, leaving Bonn as the only major settlement in Cologne not in Allied hands. Bonn was already under threat and a blockade had been imposed on it.

On 11 July the Allied commanders Hans Adam von Schöning and Adriaan van Flodroff captured a key fort close to Bonn, and eleven days later the main Allied field army arrived outside Bonn. Batteries opened fire on 24 July, but a formal siege did not begin until 16 September. On 12 October the defenders surrendered after a very heavy bombardment that left much of Bonn in ruins.

In 1703 Bonn again came under siege during the War of the Spanish Succession.

== Bibliography ==
- Childs, John. The Nine Years' War and the British Army, 1688-97. Manchester University Press, 1991.
- Lynn, John A. The Wars of Louis XIV 1667-1714. Routledge, 2013.
